= 1920s in organized crime =

This is a list of organized crime in the 1920s, arranged chronologically.

== 1920 ==
=== Events ===
- Jan. 17 - With National Prohibition having gone into effect at midnight, an army of around 25,000 federal Prohibition agents prepares to enforce the new law and arrest bootleggers and the sellers of now outlawed alcoholic beverages.
- February 3 – Chicago labor racketeer Maurice "Mossy" Enright is killed with a shotgun blast from a drive-by shooter as he parks his car on the curb by his home. Rival labor racketeer Timothy D. "Big Tim" Murphy is suspected in his slaying, but is released for lack of evidence. Although suspected by authorities to have involved the Torrio-Capone organization, Chicago labor union racketeer James Vinci is eventually convicted of his murder.
- February 20 - labor racketeer John "Smiling Jack" O'Brien is hanged in the Cook County Jail for the killing of Chicago police officer Richard Burke the previous June.
- March 31 - Several unknown gunmen shoot and kill White Hand Gang leader Dennis "Dinny" Meehan as he is taking an afternoon nap with his wife in their home in the Red Hook area of Brooklyn.
- April 15 – The Slater and Morrill Shoe Company in Braintree, Massachusetts is robbed of $15,776 ($0.3 million today) as a paymaster and guard are killed, supposedly by the Morelli Gang of Providence, Rhode Island. However, Nicola Sacco and Bartolomeo Vanzetti are, controversially, convicted of the robbery and executed in 1927.
- May 11 – Chicago business owner and racketeer James "Big Jim" Colosimo is shot and killed in the lobby of his restaurant by someone lying in wait for him, allegedly Al Capone.
- May 16 - Albert Anastasia and Giuseppe Florino fatally shoot longshoreman George Terrillo (Turino in some sources) in front of his home in Brooklyn. Terrillo dies the following day in the hospital.
- June 17 - Patrick "Paddy the Bear" Ryan, leader of the Valley Gang, is killed by Walter "The Runt" Quinlan.
- July 30 - Chicago labor racketeers Timothy D. "Big Tim" Murphy, Vincenzo "Sunny Jim" Cosmano, and Michael "Dago Mike" Carozzo are released from the Cook County Jail, where they have been imprisoned for the last four months, charged with the February killing of Maurice "Mossy" Enright. With the disappearance of the government's star witnesses, however, the state is forced to let the men go.
- August 20 – In a daring daylight robbery, Timothy D. "Big Tim" Murphy and his gang rob a mail train of $100,000. Murphy is indicted in February 1921, and convicted in November, receiving a six-year prison sentence and a $30,000 fine.
- August 23 - In an apparent business deal gone wrong, Jewish bootleggers Hirschie Miller and Samuel "Nails" Morton shoot and kill Chicago police detectives James Mulcahy and William Hennessey following a brief struggle inside the Beaux Arts Club in Chicago's South Side. Miller claims to have not known the men were cops, but the following day, a grand jury indicts Miller and Morton for the murders. However, both suspects are eventually released.
- September 28 - Detroit Mafia boss Giovanni "John" Vitale is shot and killed on Fourteenth Avenue early in the morning, the victim of a drive-by shooting. Gunmen in two vehicles hit Vitale a total of eighteen times.
- December 26 – Edward "Monk" Eastman is shot and killed on Fourteenth Street in downtown Manhattan's Union Square following an argument with a corrupt Prohibition agent named Jerry Bohan sometime in the early morning hours. The two men had allegedly been arguing over profits from bootlegging.
- December 31 - In a tense daylight robbery, six members and associates of Cleveland's Mayfield Road Mob shoot and kill Wilfred Sly and George Fanner, the president and vice-president of the W. W. Sly Manufacturing Company, and make off with the $4,200 payroll they had been transporting back to the plant. Over the following months and years, all the suspected robbers would be arrested, with only two being released. The others were tried, three of them being executed and two receiving lengthy prison sentences.
- Giuseppe Masseria assumes control of the New York City Morello Gang.

=== Births ===
- Matthew Joseph "Matty the Horse" Ianniello, loan shark and labor union racketeer for the Genovese crime family.
- April 13 – Roberto Calvi, Banco Ambrosiano chairman and mafia associate
- May 8 – Michele Sindona, Italian mason and mafia associate
- September 27 – Carlo Alberto dalla Chiesa, Italian carabinieri general, murdered in Palermo in 1982, for leading the effort to stop the violence of the Second Mafia War.

=== Deaths ===
- February 3 – Maurice Enright, Chicago labor racketeer
- February 20 - John "Smiling Jack" O'Brien, Chicago labor racketeer and cop killer
- March 31 - Dennis "Dinny" Meehan, leader of the White Hand Gang
- May 11 – James "Big Jim" Colosimo, Chicago prostitution and gambling racketeer
- June 17 - Patrick "Paddy the Bear" Ryan, Valley Gang leader.
- September 28 - Giovanni "John" Vitale, boss of the Detroit Mafia
- December 26 – Monk Eastman (Edward Osterman), Eastman Gang founder

== 1921 ==
=== Events ===
- Upon his January 1921 election as Governor of Illinois, Lennington Small would begin issuing over 1,000 pardons to Chicago criminals during his seven years in office, until his own indictment for fraud.
- Sangerman's Bombers rise to prominence soon after the 1921 arrest and imprisonment of James Sweeney, leader of Sweeney's Bombers, a Chicago gang leader and professional bomber.
- Former Black Hand bomber Andrew Kerr is arrested and charged with conspiracy to bomb several union offices.
- A major gang war breaks out in California between the Suey Sing, Bing Kong, Jung Ying and Suey Don tongs.
- Carlo Gambino, the future founder of the Gambino crime family, arrives in New York as a stowaway from Palermo, Sicily at the age of 19.
- March 8 - In separate incidents Paul Labriola and Harry Raimondi, aids of Alderman John Powers of Chicago's Nineteenth Ward, are shot and killed. The five assassins are said to include four gunmen imported from New York City.
- March 17 - Chong Yee Luck, a suspected member of San Francisco's Jun Ying Tong, is shot and killed in Locke, a community about thirty miles to the south of Sacramento. After the shooting, police arrest Joe Chew and Fong Gung, members of the Suey Dong Tong, in San Francisco. The following night, the Jun Ying Tong retaliates with the killing of Suey Dong member Tom Jew Yee in San Francisco.
- March 20 - Peter "Sugarhouse Pete" DiGiovanni, brother of Kansas City Mafia boss Joseph "Joe Church" DiGiovanni, is arrested after policemen raid his grocery store and find two gallons of prohibited corn whiskey.
- March 23 - During an attempt to arrest Thomas "Terrible Tommy" O'Connor, a member of a notorious Irish criminal gang in Chicago as well as a fugitive wanted for the murder of fellow gang member James "Jimmy" Cherin, O'Connor shoots and kills Chicago Police Detective Sgt. Patrick "Paddy" O'Neill. O'Connor then successfully escapes from his remaining pursuers by hijacking a vehicle and forcing its owner to drive him away from the area at gunpoint.
- April 15 - Chicago Black Hand leader Sam "the Devil" Cardinelli and fellow mobsters Nicholas "The Choir Boy" Viana and Frank Campione are hanged for the murder of saloon owner Andrew P. Bowman.
- May 11 – Chicago mobster and president of the Unione Siciliane Anthony D'Andrea is shot down just outside his home around 2:00 a.m., only hours following a card game the previous night. Taken to the hospital, D'Andrea dies of his wounds on the afternoon of the 12th. He is succeeded by Mike Merlo.
- May 11 - Albert Anastasia and Giuseppe Florino are convicted of the 1920 murder of longshoreman George Terrillo in Brooklyn. On May 25, Anastasia and Florino are sentenced to die in the electric chair at Sing Sing. (The two will be released from prison in April 1922, however, when New York Supreme Court Justice Mitchell May discharges them at the request of Brooklyn District Attorney John E. Ruston.)
- May 20 – Labor racketeer Cornelius Shea is accused of leading a bombing campaign during a stationary engineer's strike, in 1920. Charges are never filed due to lack of evidence.
- May 31 - Four "safe blowers" - including future North Side Gang leaders Dean O'Bannion and Earl "Hymie" Weiss - are arrested right after blowing the lid off of the safe in the offices of a local typographical union.
- July 18 – The body of West Side bootlegger "Big Steve" Wisniewski, who is not immediately identified, is discovered dead by the side of the road near the Chicago suburb of Libertyville. Wisniewski, whose corpse was first sighted by the road on the morning of Sunday the 17th (and assumed to be a sleeping drunk), is found with four gunshot wounds and a crushed skull. His body is finally identified on July 20th. Wisniewski had recently hijacked a North Side Gang beer shipment, and was last seen with Hymie Weiss. Upon Weiss's return he reportedly explained, "I took Stevie for a one way ride." This is the first time a gangland killing is used as the phrase "one way ride," a term still commonly used today to refer to this method.
- July 25 - Wanted for the murder of a Chicago detective since March, "Terrible Tommy" O'Connor is finally captured near a train yard in Minneapolis. Extradited back to Chicago, O'Connor's trial begins on September 11. On September 24, O'Connor is convicted and sentenced to hang.
- August 10 - Lim Look, thought to be a member of the Hop Sing Tong, shoots and kills Loung Bow, who is a member of both the Suey Sing and Bing Kong tongs, as the latter is working on his automobile in Stockton, California, near Sacramento. Lim is quickly arrested on the scene. This killing is one of the last known murders of the so-called Tong Wars.
- August 14 – Joseph Sinacola is gunned down in front of his two children during the long running feud between Alderman John Powers and the late Anthony D'Andrea. Sinacola had been released from hospital just two weeks earlier, following a July 6 attempt on his life.
- August 16 - Six New York City Mafiosi - including Stefano Magaddino, the future boss of the Buffalo crime family, and Vito Bonventre, a future member of the Bonanno crime family - are arrested for the murder of Carmelo Caiozzo in New Jersey in July, and arraigned the following day. The six suspects are believed to be members of a Mafia murder ring known as the "Good Killers," who are alleged to have carried out murders all over the country, including those of the Giannola Brothers in Detroit.
- October 13 - New York Mafioso Giuseppe "Diamond Joe Peppe" Viserta is shot and killed in a cafe in Manhattan's Little Italy. While attempting to return fire, Viserta fatally shoots another patron by mistake, while Viserta's killer escapes.
- December 11 - A mere four days before he is to be hanged, gangster and convicted cop killer Thomas "Terrible Tommy" O'Connor, along with four other inmates, overpower the guards and escape from the Cook County Jail. O'Connor then makes his escape from the area using a stolen gun to hijack a series of automobiles, similar to the method he had used to evade arrest immediately after killing Detective Sgt. O'Neill back in March. (After his escape, O'Connor disappears and is never recaptured.)

=== Arts and literature ===
- Season 2 of HBO's Boardwalk Empire

=== Births ===
- January 19 – William Devino, high-ranking member of the Gambino crime family
- February 24 – Peter Marcello, Sr., younger brother of Carlos Marcello, boss of the New Orleans crime family
- July 28 – Frank "Frankie Bal" Balistrieri, Milwaukee Mafia leader

=== Deaths ===
- March 17 - Chong Yee Luck, member of the Jun Ying Tong
- March 18 - Tom Jew Yee, member of the Suey Dong Tong
- April 15 – Sam Cardinelli, (Chicago) Black Hand leader
- May 12 – Anthony D'Andrea, Chicago mobster and Unione Siciliane President
- July 16 or 17 – "Big Steve" Wisniewski, West Side, Chicago bootlegger
- Aug 10 - Loung Bow, member of the Suey Sing and Bing Kong tongs
- October 13 - Giuseppe "Diamond Joe Peppe" Viserta, New York Mafioso from the Mustache Pete era

== 1922 ==
=== Events ===
- New Orleans crime family leader Carlo Matranga retires from the organization appointing Sylvestro "Sam" Carolla in his place.
- Louis Buchalter is sent to prison for burglary.
- New York crime family founders Joseph Profaci and Vincent Mangano arrive in the United States from Palermo, Sicily.
- Louis Romano, an associate of Francesco "Frank 'The Enforcer' Nitti" Nitto, is indicted for murder, however is later found acquitted. On Nitti's behalf, Romano would later assume control of the Chicago Bartender and Beverage Dispenser's Union, Local 278.
- April 9 - Chicago bootlegger Max Miller (brother of Hirschie Miller), along with William "Red" Cohen and James Adelman, are arrested following a saloon shooting in which one man was killed and four others were wounded. The shooting was reported to have been caused by one of the victims having insulted the sister of lightweight boxer Sailor Friedman.
- May 8 – In a drive-by shooting in the morning, Vincenzo Terranova is hit with a shotgun blast outside his home on 116th St. in New York, and killed, most likely by order of Rocco Valenti. Later that evening, in a similar incident, Valenti's gang attempts to kill Giuseppe "Joe the Boss" Masseria on Grand St., but Masseria and his men return fire. Five people are wounded in the shootout, including some innocent bystanders. The police manage to capture Masseria as he flees from the scene on foot. When they search him, they find a gun permit allegedly issued to him by one of the justices of the New York Supreme Court.
- May 11 – Timothy D. "Big Tim" Murphy, Cornelius "Con" Shea, and Fred "Frenchy" Mader, along with five other men are indicted for murdering a Chicago policeman early the previous morning. The state withdraws the indictment against Shea and Murphy in August for lack of evidence, while Mader's trial ends in a hung jury. Upon retrial in November, Mader is acquitted, while only one of the other men originally charged is given fourteen years.
- May 21 - Undercover detectives arrest Abe Bernstein, leader of Detroit's Purple Gang, and three others, charging them with running a gambling den on West Columbia St. In November, the four are convicted and sentenced to thirty days in jail.
- July 8 – Joseph Peter DiCarlo, co-founder and then-boss of the present day Buffalo crime family, dies of natural causes and is succeeded by longtime (1922–1974) boss Stefano Magaddino.
- August 8 – Umberto Valenti, a leading member of the Morello crime family, attempts to assassinate Joe Masseria after shooting his two bodyguards, and corners Masseria in a Second Avenue millinery shop. Masseria, however, manages to escape with two bullet holes in his straw hat. On August 11, during peace negotiations with Morrello and Masseria, Valenti is killed by Charles Luciano outside a Twelfth Street restaurant while trying to escape an apparent attempt on his life. During the shootout an eleven-year-old girl and a street cleaner are wounded.
- August 16 - Three gunmen shoot and kill Carmelo Ferraro, a Brooklyn grocery store owner and witness in a Black Hand murder case in Boston. He is killed in a garden at the back of his store, where he is hosting a party. Early the following day, Albert Anastasia and Giuseppe Florino, who were released from death row at Sing Sing in April for the 1920 murder of a longshoreman, are arrested for Ferraro's murder.
- August 29 - In the village of Elk Grove, about twenty miles northwest of Chicago, several gunmen attempt to raid three trucks transporting prohibited beer to Chicago. Four gunmen serving as armed guards for the trucks return fire. In the ensuing shootout, one member of each party is killed, while three others are wounded, including one policeman and an alderman's brother. Two nights later, on August 31, State's Attorney Robert E. Crowe names Terry Druggan and Frank Lake - leaders of the Valley Gang - as well as independent gangster Walter Stevens, as suspects in the raiding party. Druggan and Lake are arrested on September 6, but the two wounded men fail to identify them as being present on the night of the shooting.
- August 30 - Early in the morning Al Capone, who is apparently driving under the influence, crashes his vehicle into a taxi, injuring the driver. Immediately following the collision, Capone exits his vehicle brandishing a revolver and flashing a deputy sheriff's badge, and even threatens one of the witnesses. Despite his efforts, Capone is arrested, although he threatens the arresting officer with the loss of his job, and boasts that he'll be able to get the charge "fixed." In Chicago newspaper articles the following day, Capone is identified as the owner of the "Four Deuces," a brothel on Wabash Avenue.
- October 2 - In Codington County Court in Sioux Falls, South Dakota, David Berman, a native of Sioux City, Iowa, and a future Jewish mobster and associate of Meyer Lansky, is sentenced to eight months and eighteen days in the county jail after he pleads guilty to the robbery of a hotel in Watertown in January.
- October 31 - Louis "Lepke" Buchalter and three of his companions are arrested on a Brooklyn subway when an undercover detective overhears them openly discussing a recent robbery of around $15,000 worth of furs. The arrests prompt the police to charge them with another costly fur robbery in the area, amounting to a total of $45,000. However, on November 3 the magistrate releases the prisoners for lack of evidence.
- November 25 - Following an argument over a poker game, a railroad foreman named Fortunato Di Pasquale is fatally shot on Biddle St. in St. Louis, dying three days later. On December 2, a coroner's jury finds Paul and Nicholas Giambroni, brothers of St. Louis Mafia boss Dominick Giambroni, responsible for Di Pasquale's murder, while naming Dominick and his son, Joseph, as accessories. (At a preliminary hearing on January 26, 1923, the presiding judge drops the charges.)
- December 5 - Irish-American gangster William "Wild Bill" Lovett turns himself in to the Brooklyn police, who have been looking for him since the murder of rival gangster Dennis "Dinny" Meehan in March 1920. He is wanted for both the Meehan murder, as well as the murder of a black man six months later. However, on December 15, Lovett is freed from custody for lack of evidence.
- December 5 - Labor racketeer Benjamin Levinsky is shot and killed just as he enters a building on Broadway where he is employed. Following the shooting, police arrest rival gangster William Lipschitz (a.k.a. "William Levine") as a suspect, and hold Benjamin "Bushwah" Massauer as a material witness.

=== Deaths ===
- April 29 - Richard Croker, Tammany Hall politician and former member of the Fourth Avenue Tunnel Gang
- May 8 – Vincenzo Terranova, New York gangster and underboss of the Morello crime family
- July 8 – Joseph Peter DiCarlo, co-founder of the present day Buffalo crime family
- August 11 – Umberto Valenti, New York gangster and member of the Morello crime family
- December 5 – Benjamin Levinsky, New York gangster and labor racketeer.

== 1923 ==
=== Events ===
- The Chicago Crime Commission releases its first published report of those "who are constantly in conflict with the law" naming over 28 underworld figures as public enemies including James "Mad Bomber" Belcastro, Edward O'Donnell, James "Fur" Sammons, William "Three Fingers" White, Jake Guzik, and Al Capone.
- Al Capone, assisted by longtime Cook County racketeer Edward Vogel, establishes his headquarters in the Chicago suburb of Cicero, Illinois.
- Owney Madden is released from Sing Sing prison.
- Ragen's Colts member Harry Madigan is arrested and charged with kidnapping and extortion.
- Joseph Lanza, member of the Masseria crime family (evolves later to Luciano, then Genovese crime family) organizes the United Seafood Workers (USW) of New York City's Fulton Fish Market.
- January 3 – William J. "Wild Bill" Lovett, leader of Brooklyn's White Hand Gang, is shot three times in the chest on Front St. and left for dead in a nearby shanty. Although he eventually recovers from his wounds, he refuses to identify his attackers. The authorities believe the shooting to be revenge for the murder of "Dinny" Meehan in March 1920 (erroneously reported as occurring in 1921 in the Brooklyn papers).
- March 10 - Just before midnight a gunman arrives in a taxicab and enters the Home Brew Social Club on Gold St. in Brooklyn, where members of the White Hand Gang are gathered for a party. The gunman opens fire, seriously wounding four men, including Richard "Peg Leg" Lonergan, before he flees on foot. All four victims are taken to the hospital.
- May 10 - Salvatore Sabella, boss of the Philadelphia crime family is arrested on suspicion of having bombed a wholesale grocery store earlier in the morning.
- May 13 - While horseback riding with friends, including Dean O'Bannion and his wife, on North Clark Street near Lincoln Park, Jewish bootlegger and O'Bannion partner Samuel "Nails" Morton is thrown from his horse and killed when the animal kicks Morton in the head. In retaliation for Morton's death, several members of O'Bannion's North Side Gang reportedly later rent the same horse, shooting it dead in revenge, a scene recreated in the gangster film The Public Enemy (1931).
- July 14 - Albert Anastasia and Giuseppe Florino are sentenced to three years in prison for the illegal possession of firearms.
- August 1 – The third New York City Labor Slugger War (with thugs hired by both sides to do battle in strikebreaker situations) begins after Jacob "Little Augie" Orgen and his "Little Augies" ally with Solomon Schapiro against Nathan "Kid Dropper" Kaplan's "Rough Riders" during a gun battle between the gangs on Essex Street resulting in the wounding of Jacob "Gurrah" Shapiro, partner of Louis "Lepke" Buchalter, and William "Footsy" Weissman, as well as Weissman's female companion. Though Shapiro and Weissman are critically wounded, Shapiro makes a full recovery. Nathan Kaplan and fourteen others are later arrested and charged with attempted murder.
- August 28 – Nathan Kaplan is killed when gunman Louis Cohen, a member of the Little Augies, shoots Kaplan while he is being transported from Essex Market Court following his acquittal for extortion. Following the assassination, Cohen is immediately arrested while freely admitting his guilt. In the wake of the killing, police conduct multiple raids around the city, and manage to arrest several suspects, including Jacob Orgen and Samuel Weiss. Although Orgen and Weiss are arraigned on charges of having been involved in Kaplan's murder, the magistrate dismisses the charges in Manhattan Homicide Court on September 7.
- September 7 – In a continuing bootlegger war in South Side, Chicago, between the Southside O'Donnell Brothers and an alliance of the Saltis-McErlane Gang and the Chicago Outfit, Saltis-McErlane leader Frank McErlane kills Jerry O'Connor, a member of the Southside O'Donnell Brothers, in a driveby shooting. McErlane is the first to use a Thompson submachine gun, which becomes popularly known as a "Tommy Gun".
- September 17 – Frank McErlane kills again, gunning down George "Georgia" Meegan and George "Spot" Bucher of the Southside O'Donnell Brothers. In a drive-by shooting, McErlane and his men fire shotguns and pistols at the two victims as the pair are seated in a parked automobile at the intersection of Laflin St. and Garfield Blvd.
- October 2 - Ignacio Antinori, boss of the Tampa Mafia family, is arrested on a charge of human smuggling for illegally bringing Chinese people into the United States from Cuba. He is released from the county jail the following morning on a $2,500 bond. He is also reported to be under a $7,500 bond for the same activities in Richmond, Virginia.
- November 1 – Having survived the January 3 assassination attempt, White Hand Gang leader William "Wild Bill" Lovett is killed by an unknown person or persons as he sleeps off a night of drinking in the back of an abandoned store on Bridge St. in Brooklyn. Lovett is shot several times in the head, and his head is bashed in with a heavy object. A few days later, on November 5, Lovett is buried in the Cypress Hills National Cemetery with full military honors, for having fought bravely during World War I.
- November 5 - Michael Izzo, a Nineteenth Ward bootlegger, is shot dead at close range as he pumps a leaky tire on South Throop St. in Chicago. The assassin then flees on foot.
- December 1 – Frank McErlane strikes again, kidnapping Thomas "Morrie" Keane and William "Shorty" Egan, two beer-runners for the Southside O'Donnell Brothers, on the Lemont Highway to the southwest of Chicago. McErlane shoots both men multiple times with a shotgun before throwing them out of a moving car. Keane is killed, and Egan is left for dead, although he recovers and is able to provide an eyewitness account of the incident.
- December 3 - Manhattan police arrest Owney Madden, George "Big Frenchy" DeMange, and Henry Jacobs as suspects in the theft of twenty cases of whiskey (valued at $16,000) from a warehouse on West Sixty-Fourth St. the previous afternoon.

=== Arts and literature ===
- When the Kellys Were Out (film)
- Season 3 of HBO's Boardwalk Empire

=== Births ===
- Benjamin "Lefty" Ruggiero, Bonanno crime family member
- Joseph Todaro, Buffalo Mafia Leader
- Gaetano Badalamenti, Italian mobster

=== Deaths ===
- May 2 – Emilio Picariello and Florence Lassandro hanged for killing police officer, the only woman to be hanged in Alberta
- May 13 - Samuel "Nails" Morton, Chicago bootlegger
- August 23 – Nathan Kaplan, New York Prohibition gangster
- September 7 - Jerry O'Connor, member of the Southside O'Donnell Gang
- September 17 - George "Georgia" Meegan, member of the Southside O'Donnell Gang
- September 17 - George "Spot" Bucher, member of the Southside O'Donnell Gang
- November 1 – William J. "Wild Bill" Lovett, White Hand Gang leader
- November 5 - Michael Izzo, Chicago bootlegger

== 1924 ==
=== Events ===
- Joseph Amato takes over as head of the Milwaukee crime family, a subordinate family to the Chicago Outfit
- Thomas Joseph McGinty, a Cleveland bootlegger and fight promoter, is indicted with two other family members by a federal grand jury and charged with operating "a gigantic wholesale and retail conspiracy" through his saloon. After serving eighteen months at Atlanta Federal Penitentiary, he resumes his bootlegging activities.
- Walter Stevens, a long-time Chicago gangster and labor slugger credited with the deaths of over 60 men, retires as a gunman for the Torrio-Capone organization where he lives peacefully until his death in 1939.
- Joseph Bonanno, future founder of the Bonanno crime family, arrives in New York from Sicily.
- A tong war breaks out between the On Leong and Hip Sing tongs after several members of the On Leongs defect to the Hip Sings with a large amount of money.
- February 13 - William "Dinty" Colbeck, boss of Egan's Rats, and several of his men shoot and kill Eddie Linehan, another member of the gang and a suspect in a mail robbery the previous year. They then dump Linehan's body on Goodfellow Ave., where St. Louis police later discover it.
- February 22 - The murdered body of John Duffy, an associate of the North Side Gang, is discovered on a prairie in the snow on the southwestern edge of Chicago. That evening, police search Duffy's apparent, where they find the body of Duffy's wife or live-in girlfriend, Maybelle Exley, who had also been shot dead. During the course of the investigation, it is learned that Duffy himself had killed Exley, and had then reached out in a panic to North Side boss Dean O'Bannion to help him get rid of Exley's body. Rather than helping him, however, O'Bannion had instead shot Duffy in the head, and disposed of his body on the outskirts of town.
- March 13 - Five men attempt to assassinate Chicago bootlegger and racketeer Hirschie Miller as the latter is driving his car on Racine Ave., near North Clark St. Miller notices the gunmen, however, and is able to duck down into his vehicle to avoid being hit. That night, around midnight, Miller's cleaning and dyeing business on North Clark St. is bombed. While police believe that rival bootleggers, including Dean O'Bannion, are likely behind these attacks on Miller, Hirschie himself blames the Cleaners and Dyers' Association and its war on independent business owners.
- April 1 – Frank Capone, brother of Al Capone, is killed by police during the fighting which broke out while leading around 200 gunmen into Cicero, Illinois during the 1924 Chicago Elections in support of Mafia backed Republican politicians.
- April 11 - Michael Bossomo, a criminal associate of the Russo Gang in St. Louis, is fatally shot as he sits in his parked car in front of a grocery store on North Seventh Street. Taken to City Hospital, Bossomo names Anthony "Shorty" Russo and Vincent Spicuzza as the men who shot him, before he dies of his wounds.
- April 25 - As a bank cashier is carrying two mail bags containing a $63,000 payroll across the street from the post office to the Granite City National Bank in Granite City, Illinois (a suburb of St. Louis), several members of Egan's Rats in two automobiles pull up and rob the cashier at gunpoint. Although the cashier is armed with a shotgun, the weapon jams, but armed men at both the post office and the bank manage to fire at the vehicles, and a shootout takes place for a few moments before the gangsters make away with the money, abandoning one of the vehicles, which turned out to be stolen, in a village near East St. Louis.
- May 8 - Following an altercation in a saloon on Wabash Ave. in Chicago, Al Capone kills independent beer runner and criminal Joseph L. "Ragtime Joe" Howard, shooting him several times at close range. According to some sources, the killing of Howard is in retaliation for his having assaulted Capone's bagman, Jake "Greasy Thumb" Guzik, as it is apparently Guzik who accompanies Capone to the saloon at the time of the shooting.
- May 12 - Angelo "Buffalo Bill" Palmeri, former boss and current consigliere of the Buffalo crime family, is indicted in federal court for making false claims concerning his citizenship in order to obtain a gun permit.
- May 19 - In the morning, Chicago policemen raid the Sieben brewery on Larrabee St., and arrest Johnny Torrio and Dean O'Bannion, the two main owners of the brewery, as well as Louis Alterie and 28 others. Three policemen who had been assigned to guard the supposedly shutdown brewery are also arrested and jailed. Because this arrest marks Torrio's second violation of the Volstead Act, he will face mandatory prison time.
- May 22 - Just before midnight, Jewish mobster Joseph "Joey" Amberg is shot and critically wounded in a shootout with rival gangsters at the intersection of Broadway and Roebling Streets in Brooklyn. In the hospital, Amberg refuses to identify his shooters, and says that he will "settle it" himself.
- July 18 - John L. "Johnny Jack" Nounes, leader of the Downtown Gang of Galveston, Texas, is sentenced to two years in Leavenworth Penitentiary for violation of the national Prohibition laws. Nounes remains free on bond pending his appeal.
- August 24 - Jewish mobster Joseph "Doc" Stacher, currently living in New Jersey, is charged in an Asbury Park court with having passed a bad check to some girls inside a restaurant on August 18.
- September 21 - In a drive-by shooting on Essex St. in Manhattan, three unidentified gangsters riding in a taxicab allegedly shoot and kill Harry "Kid Portchester" Marks, a member of "Little Augie" Orgen's gang, in front of his former home. The driver of the taxi is Benjamin "Bugsy" Siegel, who police do manage to apprehend, although Siegel feigns ignorance as to the shooters' identities. Despite this, Siegel is charged as an accessory, but he is freed when a magistrate dismisses the charges in homicide court on October 7.
- November 9 - Mike Merlo, Chicago politician and President of the Unione Siciliana, a Scilian-American fraternal organization that has also become a front for Italian-American organized crime in recent years, dies at his home of complications from cancer.
- November 10 – Chicago North Side Gang leader Dean O'Banion is killed when three unidentified men - believed to be New York crime boss Frankie Yale, along with Albert Anselmi and John Scalise, members of the local Genna gang - enter his flower shop and shoot him several times. This begins a five-year gang war between the North Side Gang, under Hymie Weiss, against Al Capone's Chicago Outfit that would end with the St. Valentine's Day Massacre, in 1929.
- November 15 - In Quincy, Illinois, gang leader William "Dinty" Colbeck and eight other members of Egan's Rats are convicted of a 1923 mail robbery in Staunton, Illinois in which $54,000 was stolen. Upon their conviction, all of the men are sentenced to 25 years in federal prison, and are immediately shipped to Leavenworth Federal Prison to await trial in a mail robbery in St. Louis that netted $260,000.

=== Births ===
- April 2 – Vito Ciancimino, Sicilian mobster and Palermo mayor
- April 21 – Philip "Chicken Man" Testa, Philadelphia crime family boss
- May 12 – Michele "the Pope" Greco, Sicilian Mafia boss

=== Deaths ===
- February 13 - Eddie Linehan, member of Egan's Rats
- February 22 - John Duffy, associate of the North Side Gang
- April 1 – Frank Capone, Chicago Outfit member
- May 8 - Joseph L. "Ragtime Joe" Howard, independent Chicago beer runner and criminal
- September 21 - Harry "Kid Portchester" Marks, member of Jacob "Little Augie" Orgen's gang
- November 9 - Mike Merlo, Chicago politician and President of the Unione Siciliana
- November 10 – Dean O'Banion, North Side Gang leader

== 1925 ==
=== Events ===
- Italian dictator Benito Mussolini's campaign against the Sicilian Mafia causes many Sicilian mafiosi, organized by Don Vito Cascio Ferro, to flee Italy. Ferro would later prepare to move his criminal operations to the United States before his arrest the following year.
- Carlo Matranga leaves New Orleans to establish the Los Angeles crime syndicate.
- John Barry, a member of the Sheldon Gang, is sentenced to two years for violation of the Volstead Act (Prohibition).
- January 12 – North Side Gang members Hymie Weiss, Bugs Moran, and Vincent Drucci, attempt to kill Al Capone at a South Side, Chicago restaurant. They fire at Capone's car, injuring his chauffeur but missing Capone.
- January 12 - Cleveland boxing promoter and bootlegger Thomas J. "Blackjack" McGinty pleads guilty to violating the national Phohibition law, and is sentenced to eighteen months in the federal penitentiary in Atlanta, and a fine of $8300.
- January 24 – Weiss, Moran, Drucci, and Frank Gusenberg ambush Chicago Outfit leader Johnny Torrio as he returns from shopping with his wife, shooting him and his chauffeur, Robert Barton, several times. As Moran is about to kill Torrio, the gun misfires. The gunmen are forced to flee as the police arrive. Soon after this attack, Torrio would retire to Italy, giving leadership of The Outfit to his lieutenant, Capone.
- February 9 – Johnny Torrio is sentenced by Judge Adam Cliffe to nine months in the Lake County Jail, in Waukegan, Illinois, a short distance north of Chicago. Torrio's lawyers ostensibly choose this facility because Torrio can receive proper medical treatment there; however, the real reason is for Torrio's protection as the Sheriff Edwin Ahlstrom is on Torrio's payroll. After his release, Torrio would be escorted by Capone out of Lake County.
- February 24 - Ralph Sheldon, leader of the Sheldon Gang, and George "Rabbit" Connell are among those arrested for various acts of election day violence and sabotage arising from Chicago's aldermanic elections. The criminal acts mostly center on the Fourteenth, Fifteenth, and Forty-Third Wards, and include kidnappings, shootings, and ballot thefts. Sheldon's brother, Stanley, is himself hospitalized after he shoots it out with a policeman during one attempted kidnapping in the Fifteenth Ward.
- March 16 - During an altercation outside a boxing venue on Springfield Ave. in Newark, New Jersey bootlegger Joseph Reinfeld knocks former Prohibition agent Louis "Lone Wolf" La Fera to the pavement, fracturing his skull. La Fera dies at the hospital early the following morning, and Reinfeld is arrested and charged with his murder.
- March 26 - During an early morning altercation on Cadillac Ave., Detroit mobster Mike Dipisa shoots and fatally wounds Earl Maher, who dies while en route to the hospital. That evening, after Dipisa is arrested, he confesses to the killing, but claims he shot the man is self defense.
- April 7 - Chicago bootlegger Joseph Larson is shot dead in an alley near the corner of Grand Ave. and Halsted St.
- April 9 - Galveston gang boss John L. "Johnny Jack" Nounes and four others are acquitted in federal court in Houston of charges of conspiracy to violate the national Prohibition laws. (Nounes is already under a two-year sentence for a previous conviction in June 1924, which he will begin serving in July.)
- May 11 - During a party at the Durant Social Club located in the Village Inn in the neighborhood of Bath Beach in Brooklyn, three gunmen enter the ballroom and shoot Henry "Doggie" Ginsberg, brother of labor racketeer Abe "Little Doggie" Ginsberg, five times, killing him. As the killers leave, Hyman "Hymie" Jacobson pursues them, and is shot dead outside. Two nights later, the police arrest Hyman Amberg, but witnesses fail to identify him as one of the shooters. Then, on June 13, police arrest Abraham "Curley" Aaronson, a rival labor racketeer, and indict him for the double murder. However, on November 10, New York Supreme Court Justice James C. Cropsey directs that Aaronson be acquitted after the assistant D.A. fails to prove the charges.
- May 18 - In Chicago a squad of detectives arrest a drunken Ralph Sheldon and Carl C. Ausburger following a car chase lasting for over a mile, in which Sheldon and his companion exchange gunfire with the lawmen. Upon their arrest, the gunmen are said to be "so drunk...they could not be questioned."
- May 26 – Shortly after claiming the presidency of the Unione Siciliana, Angelo "Bloody Angelo" Genna, boss of the Genna crime family, is shot over a dozen times while driving his car in Chicago's Little Italy, possibly by members of the North Side Gang. He later dies at the hospital after refusing to tell the police who had shot him.
- June 13 - While patrolling on Western Ave. in Chicago, a car load of detectives spot another vehicle containing four suspicious characters, including Mike "the Devil" Genna, and Genna Gang enforcers John Scalise and Albert Anselmi, and decide to give chase. After a high-speed chase, the car full of gangsters is forced off the street and onto a curb, where it crashes into a lamp post. The gangsters, armed with shotguns, begin firing at the policemen, killing Detectives Charles Walsh and Harold Olson, and wounding Detective Michael Conway. As the gangsters are fleeing the scene of the shootout, Genna is hit in the leg, severing his femoral artery. Genna is finally cornered while taking refuge in a nearby basement, where he is subdued. Although an ambulance is summoned, Genna bleeds to death before he can be taken to the hospital. Scalise and Anselmi are eventually arrested after boarding a streetcar on Western Ave.
- July 8 - After being lured to a meeting at Grand Ave. and Curtis St., Tony "the Gentleman" Genna is ambushed and fatally shot. Before he dies at the hospital, Genna reveals to his brother Sam that it was a supposed friend, Antonio "Cavalero" (or "the Cavalier") Spano, who had set up the meeting at which he was shot. It is believed that members of the North Side Gang may have also been involved. Tony Genna is the third of the once-powerful Genna Brothers to die in just over a month's time.
- July 14 – James Russo, an independent bootlegger in Chicago's "Little Italy", is fatally shot in front of his bakery on South Racine Ave. by Al Capone's gunmen, and dies moments after being taken to a nearby hospital.
- July 18 - At the intersection of Wells and 29th Streets in Chicago, a gunfight breaks out between labor racketeers resulting in the deaths of James "Jimmy" Vinci and Joseph "Machine Gun Joe" Granata. A third man is seen shooting one of the downed men several times before fleeing on foot.
- July 23 - George "Big Bates" Karl, a Sheldon Gang hitman, goes missing. On November 27, Karl's bullet-riddled body is found in a ditch in the village of Stickney, Illinois to the southwest of Cicero. He is believed to have been a victim of the Joe Saltis-Frank McErlane Gang.
- August 18 - Joseph "Joe" Bruno (born Joseph LoCascio, and no known relation to the future Philadelphia crime family boss of the same name, who was born Giuseppe Dovi), a Philadelphia bootlegger and drug trafficker, is fatally shot near his home on Catherine St. That evening, Ignatius Lanzetta, a member of the rival Lanzetta Brothers gang, is arrested following an attempted drive-by shooting of several other rival drug peddlers, followed by a shootout with Philadelphia police. However, Bruno dies at Howard Hospital the following morning without revealing the identity of his killers. On August 22, Ignatius Lanzetta is charged with Bruno's murder.
- August 22 – Five masked gunmen shoot and kill Leo Lanzetta, brother of Ignatius Lanzetta as well as a member of the Lanzetta Brothers gang, outside his saloon on Seventh and Bainbridge Streets in Philadelphia. (Although it is not certain who killed Lanzetta, it is believed to have been carried out on the orders of Philadelphia crime family boss Salvatore Sabella.)
- September 16 - Angelo Acquisto, future underboss of the Buffalo crime family, is arrested along with four others at a Pittston, Pennsylvania polling place, and charged with carrying a concealed firearm.
- September 23 - In raids on two separate buildings in Manhattan, thirty Prohibition agents arrest Max "Big Maxie" Greenberg and Waxey Gordon (Irving Wexler) along with eleven other members of their bootlegging ring.
- October 31 - In Indianapolis, a federal grand jury returns four indictments against 39 individuals believed to be involved in the 1923 theft of 893 barrels of whiskey from the Jack Daniel's warehouse in St. Louis. The following day, Allen Curry, the Federal District Attorney for the Eastern District of Missouri, publicizes the names of those indicted, including Imogene Remus, the estranged wife of Cincinnati bootlegger George Remus, and future Chicago Outfit associate Edward J. "Easy Eddie" O'Hare, as well as numerous politicians and criminals based in St. Louis.
- November 10 – Samuzzo "Samoots" Amatuna, an associate of the Genna crime family, is fatally shot inside a West Side, Chicago barber shop by members of the North Side Gang. Although friends manage to get Amatuna to the hospital, he dies early on the morning of the 13th.
- November 18 – Amatuna associate and bodyguard Edward "Eddie Zine" Zion is shot and killed in Willow Springs, Illinois, to the southwest of Cicero, shortly after returning from Amatuna's funeral.
- November 20 – Amatuna associate and bodyguard Abraham "Pete the Peddler" Goldstein is shot and killed by unidentified gunmen while in a drug store on Blue Island Avenue in Chicago, although witnesses, including Goldstein's 14-year-old sister, later stated that they saw several members and associates of the West Side O'Donnell Gang in the vicinity both before and after the shooting.
- November 26 - In Brooklyn, two bandits hold up a butcher shop belonging to Irving Lippman, and rob Lippman of $1,200 before tying him up and leaving him suspended from a meat hook in a locked walk-in refrigerator. Lippman survives the ordeal and is able to identify one of the suspects as Vincenzo Cappiello, a member of Frankie Yale's gang. After a two-week search, Cappiello is arrested on December 15 and charged with assault and robbery, with his bail set at $50,000.
- November 27 - Joseph Sangerman, leader of Sangerman's Bombers, is arrested, and later imprisoned. His death the following year while still awaiting trial would lead to that organization's eventual breakup.
- December 3 - In raids conducted in Manhattan, Brooklyn, and Long Island, as well as New London, Connecticut, federal agents arrest 16 out of 43 men wanted for the operation of an illegal rum-running ring that has operated for the past two years with the cooperation of members of the United States Coast Guard. Among those arrested and immediately taken to federal court to be arraigned are William V. "Big Bill" Dwyer, the alleged mastermind of the operation, and rising Mafioso Frank Costello. Others are arrested in the following days.
- December 22 – Joseph "Dynamite Joe" Brooks, believed to be a member of Ragen's Colts, is shot and killed along with Edward Harmening, an off-duty sheriff's deputy, their bodies left in the back seat of Harmening's automobile. The following day, a coroner's jury theorizes that the two were likely the victims of the Saltis-McErlane Gang.
- December 26 - In the early morning hours, as a Christmas party is winding to a close at the Adonis Social Club on 20th St. in Brooklyn, Richard "Peg Leg" Lonergan and two of his men are shot and killed, essentially bringing the Irish-American White Hand Gang to an end. Lonergan, last boss of the White Hand Gang, had arrived at the club with five of his men to celebrate the Christmas holidays, as well as to harass any Italians they saw there. Just after 3:00 a.m., as those in attendance at the party are dwindling, someone turns the lights off, and the shooting begins, leaving Lonergan and fellow gang members Aaron Harms and Cornelius "Needles" Ferry dead. While Lonergan and Ferry drop dead inside the club, Harms makes it to the street before someone finishes him off with a blow to the head with a sharp object, believed to be a meat cleaver or a similar instrument. Another member, James Hart, is wounded, while the others get away unharmed. Among those arrested in the days following the shootings is Al Capone, who has recently become boss of the Chicago Outfit, and who is in New York to obtain medical treatment for his son.

=== Births ===
- January 19 – Rocco Chinnici, Italian anti-mafia magistrate
- January 26 – Luciano Leggio, Sicilian (Corleonesi) mafia boss
- August 7 – Anthony Gaggi "Nino", high-ranking member of the Gambino crime family
- August 16 – William G. Hundley, head of the Justice Department's Organized Crime and Racketeering Section.
- December 22, Peter Milano, Los Angeles crime family boss

=== Deaths ===
- January 22 – James Patrick "Big Jim" O'Leary, Chicago gambler
- April 7 - Joseph Larson, Chicago bootlegger
- May 11 - Henry "Doggie" Ginsberg, Brooklyn labor racketeer
- May 11 - Hyman "Hymie" Jacobson, Brooklyn labor racketeer
- May 26 - Angelo "Bloody Angelo" Genna, boss of the Genna crime family
- June 13 - Michele "Mike the Devil" Genna, leading member of the Genna crime family
- July 8 - Antonio "Tony the Gentleman" Genna, leading member of the Genna crime family
- July 14 - James Russo, Chicago bootlegger
- July 18 - James "Jimmy" Vinci, Chicago labor racketeer
- July 18 - Joseph "Machine Gun Joe" Granata, Chicago labor racketeer
- July 23 - Sheldon Gang hitman George "Big Bates" Karl
- August 18 - Joseph "Joe" Bruno, Philadelphia bootlegger and drug trafficker
- August 22 - Leo Lanzetta, member of the Lanzetta Brothers gang
- November 13 – Samuzzo Amatuna "Samoots", Unione Siciliane president and former member of the recently disbanded Genna Brothers gang.
  - November 18 – Edward "Eddie Zine" Zion, Amatuna associate
  - November 20 – Abraham "Pete the Peddler" Goldstein, Amatuna associate
- December 22 – Joseph "Dynamite Joe" Brooks, Ragen's Colts and Saltis-McErlane Gang member
- December 26 - Richard "Peg Leg" Lonergan, last boss of the White Hand Gang
- December 26 - Aaron Harms, member of the White Hand Gang
- December 26 - Cornelius "Needles" Ferry, member of the White Hand Gang

== 1926 ==
=== Events ===
- Sicilian Mafia Don Vito Cascio Ferro is arrested by Benito Mussolini and imprisoned. Casio Ferro would remain in prison until his death in 1945.
- January 10 – Henry J. Spingola, Chicago politician and brother-in-law to the six Genna Brothers, is shot multiple times as he gets in his automobile parked in front of a restaurant on South Halsted St. Although some friends drive Spingola to the hospital, he soon dies. Although it is believed that members of the Chicago Outfit killed Spingola, Spingola's brother, Peter Spingola, blames Hymie Weiss, boss of the North Side Gang.
- January 20 - In Charleston, South Carolina bootlegger Manley S. Sullivan is convicted in federal court of income tax evasion. On January 26, Sullivan is sentenced to six months in jail. Sullivan's appeal of his sentence will go on to be argued the following year in the United States Supreme Court in the case of United States v. Sullivan. The first bootlegger to be tried and convicted using federal income tax law, Sullivan's case is a test case that will open the way for notorious Prohibition bootleggers such as Chicago's Al Capone to be tried for their various crimes using the charge of income tax evasion.
- February 5 - Around noon, someone sets off a bomb in front of Ralph Sheldon's home on South Rockwell St., destroying his automobile which is parked at the curb.
- February 5 - On a farm near Horseshoe Lake in Madison County, Illinois, about four miles east of St. Louis, the bodies of two Edwardsville men missing since January 29, are discovered in a shallow grave. The men are Constable Ohmer Hockett, a member of the Ku Klux Klan, and John Balke, a friend of Hockett's who is known to have spent time in a reformatory. They had gone to the area with the intention of raiding a large moonshining operation thought to be running on the farm. Both men have been shot, and Hockett's skull has been crushed. The Prohibition agents who find the bodies also find several concrete vats for storing the moonshine, but the still has been removed. The evening after the discovery, the sheriff issues an arrest warrant for John Giannola, brother of St. Louis Mafia boss Vito Giannola, who police learn had a stolen automobile towed from the farm on the very same day the murder victims went missing. On February 8, a federal warrant is also issued for John Giannola for transporting a stolen vehicle across state lines. Giannola, however, is able to evade arrest until March, when he makes a deal with the feds to turn himself in, which happens on March 29. The case is later dismissed for lack of evidence.
- February 10 - While still awaiting trial on multiple bombing indictments, Chicago labor racketeer and bomber Joseph M. Sangerman falls ill of intestinal problems resulting from an old shooting injury, and has to undergo emergency surgery at Grant Hospital. Following the surgery, Sangerman remains in critical condition, and he dies at the hospital on the night of February 12.
- February 10 - Following a machine gun shooting at a saloon on South Halsted St., in which Sheldon Gang members William Wilson and John "Mitters" Foley are seriously wounded, police begin searching for rival gang bosses Frank McErlane and Joseph "Polack Joe" Saltis.
- February 15 – Urazio "The Scourge" Tropea, an associate of the Genna crime family, is gunned down in a drive-by shooting by unidentified gunmen.
- February 21 – A boy walking to Sunday School in the Chicago suburb of Oak Lawn discovers the body of Genna crime family ally Vito Bascone, a West Side bootlegger. Bascone has been "taken for a ride" and shot in the head, his corpse dumped in Oak Park, while his vehicle is discovered at the bottom of a quarry between Summit and Lyons.
- February 23 – Another Genna Gang member, Ecola Edward "the Eagle" Baldelli, is "taken for a ride", his body dumped in an alley behind a factory on North Curtis St.
- March 7 - As four members of the ever-shrinking Genna Gang are riding in a car, men in a second vehicle fire sawed-off shotguns at them, killing John Calabriese, and wounding the others.
- March 29 - Ralph Sheldon is arrested once again when he and two of his associates are pulled over. The detectives search the men, and find that each one is carrying two revolvers.
- April 3 - In a saloon on South Loomis St. in Chicago, John "Paddy the Fox" Ryan, the son of former Valley Gang boss Patrick "Paddy the Bear" Ryan, who currently sells bootlegged beer for the Sheldon Gang, shoots and kills Walter "Runt" Quinlan, the man who killed Ryan's father, who currently runs beer for the rival West Side O'Donnell Gang.
- April 6 - Just after midnight at the Wethersfield State Prison in Connecticut, bootlegger and robbery gang leader Gerald Chapman is executed for the October 1925 murder of Police Officer James Skelly in New Britain. Chapman is hanged using an upright jerker.
- April 10 - As Sheldon Gang members John Tuccello and Frank De Laurentis are delivering bootlegged alcohol to a saloon on West 51st St. in Chicago, four members of the rival Saltis-McErlane Gang enter the saloon and kidnap the two men, and carry them away in their own automobile. Tuccello and De Laurentis are reported missing the following morning, but it is not until around noon on April 15 that their bullet-riddled bodies are discovered in their own vehicle, which is placed in front of Ralph Sheldon's home at 65th and Rockwell Streets.
- April 17 - The murdered body of William "Rags" McCue, a member of Chicago's West Side O'Donnell Gang, is discovered in a ditch near Hinsdale.
- April 22 - In a police raid on a saloon on West 50th St. in Chicago, Joe Saltis and Frank McErlane are arrested along with several members of their gang, as well as Walter Stevens. McErlane, in particular is held on warrants for crimes committed in Indiana, including one charging him with the May 1924 murder of a Crown Point attorney, Thad S. Fancher. (McErlane would not be extradited back to Indiana for trial until August, where he would eventually be acquitted.)
- April 27 - As several members of the West Side O'Donnell Gang are standing outside a saloon on West Roosevelt Road in Cicero, someone in a moving automobile fires at the group with a machine gun, fatally wounding gang members James "Jim" Doherty and Thomas "Red" Duffy, as well as Assistant State's Attorney William "Bill" McSwiggin, who was a childhood friend of several of the gang members, and has been out drinking with them. A passerby takes Duffy to the hospital, where he soon dies, while the bodies of Doherty and McSwiggin are abandoned in nearby Berwyn, where they are found about an hour after the shootings. Outraged at the death of McSwiggin, Cook County officials begin a series of raids against the bootlegging gangs, arresting Ralph Capone, older brother of Al Capone, and Charles Fischetti in Cicero on the morning of April 29. Taken along with the gangsters are an arsenal of weapons, as well as a set of bookkeeping ledgers recording the financial transactions of the Chicago Outfit under Al Capone. Officials soon focus on Al Capone as the leading suspect in the murders, but he manages to successfully go into hiding ahead of the raids, and is able to elude capture for several months.
- May 1 - Early in the morning, Martin Garrity, believed to be a low level member of the Sheldon Gang, is shot and killed while riding in a taxi cab with several other suspicious characters, his body dumped in an alley. His killer is soon identified as Francis (or Frank) "Doc" White, an ex-convict and another minor player in the bootlegging gangs. At first it is believed that Garrity is the innocent victim of a robbery, but within a few days the murder is described as a gang killing.
- May 14 - On a Friday afternoon in Pueblo, Colorado, the Carlino Brothers, leaders of a "Black Hand" and bootlegging gang, and three of their men fatally shoot rivals Pete and Tony Danna as the latter are standing in front of a poolhall belonging to Sam English, who is also wounded in the shooting. A third Danna brother, Sam Danna, escapes unharmed.
- May 17 - On 43rd St. in Chicago, bootlegger James McDonough and Thomas Dire, an associate of labor racketeer Tom Maloy, get into a shootout over an issue involving their girlfriends, and Dire is shot. He dies on the way to the hospital.
- May 20 - Frank Cremaldi (or Crimaldi), a former Detroit gangster and current associate of the Chicago Outfit, is shot several times in the back of the head and killed after meeting with his killers on a country road near the village of Franklin Park. Cremaldi's body is discovered there the following morning. After the discovery of the murder, police pick up and question Mike Carozza, Cremaldi's friend and another Outfit associate, before releasing him the same night.
- June 2 - Early in the morning, as Chicago Heights gangster Girolamo "James" Lamberta is leaving the roadhouse of friend and fellow gangster, Philip Piazza, with two female friends in the Chicago suburb of Thornton, unknown assassins fire on the group with shotguns, instantly killing Lamberta and one of the women, while wounding the other woman.
- July 13 - As West Side, Chicago bootlegger Joseph Ciccone is walking into his house on Flournoy St., two unknown men approach him, get into an argument with him, and shoot him dead.
- July 13 - Early in the morning, West Side, Chicago gangster Jules Portugese is shot in the head four times at close range, probably inside a car, and his body is dumped on Milwaukee Avenue to the north of the village of Niles, where it is later discovered by two boys. Suspicion for the crime falls on bootlegger Nate Goldberg, who disappears after his arrest is ordered.
- July 20 - Detroit bootlegger William Glanzrock is shot and killed at the intersection of Oakland Ave. and Leicester Ct. Police soon arrest Purple Gang member Louis Fleisher as a suspect, but are unable to produce evidence against him, and he is released.
- July 22 - At around 10:15 a.m. two gunmen enter the Manhattan jewelry store of Aaron Rodack and attempt to hold him up, but when the jeweler produces his own weapon, the robbers flee. Rodack and one of his clerks then run after the bandits as they make their way to their getaway car, but one of them, Hyman Amberg, turns and shoots both pursuers, killing Rodack with a bullet in the chest. On August 27, Amberg's partner, Benjamin Mintz, is arrested in Brooklyn, and confesses to his involvement in a string of robberies, including the botched robbery at Rodack's store. He also lays the blame for killing Rodack on Amberg, who is arrested the same evening in Albany. On September 1, Hyman Amberg is formally charged with Rodack's murder when he appears in homicide court, and is held for trial.
- July 22 - Philip Piazza, friend of the late James Lamberta, is himself shot dead outside his Milano Cafe on Lowe Ave. in Chicago Heights, Illinois by two unknown assassins.
- July 26 - Late at night in federal court in Manhattan, following a three-week trial, William V. "Big Bill" Dwyer and an associate are convicted of conspiracy to violate the national Prohibition law as heads of a bootlegging ring operating in and around New York City, and which had involved members of the Coast Guard. Dwyer is immediately sentenced to two years in the federal penitentiary in Atlanta, and a $10,000 fine. Six of his co-defendants are acquitted. (Frank Costello, Dwyer's partner in the bootleg ring, and who was arrested at the same time as Dwyer, will be brought to trial the following January, where he will receive a mistrial.)
- July 28 - After being on the run ever since the murders of assistant state's attorney William "Bill" McSiggin and two members of the West Side O'Donnell Gang back in April, Al Capone finally turns himself in to Chicago authorities. The following day, however, the case against Capone is dismissed for lack of evidence, and Capone is released.
- August 3 - As he is standing on a street corner early in the morning in Chicago Heights, Joe Salvo, nephew of the late Chicago Heights gang boss James Lamberta, is hit in the side with a shotgun blast in a drive-by shooting. Salvo dies at the hospital a few hours later.
- August 4 - In Detroit, Philip Keywell, a member of the Purple Gang, and two other armed robbers hold up a blind pig on Brush St., stealing between $6,000 and $7,000 worth of money and jewelry from the bar's owner and patrons (including the widow of gangster Frank Cremaldi, who was killed in Chicago in May). A trace of the getaway car's license plate number leads to the arrest of Keywell, who is charged the following week. On August 23, however, the judge dismisses the charge against Keywell.
- August 6 - As he is driving his car on Richmond St. near his home in Chicago, Sheldon Gang member John "Mitters" Foley notices another vehicle tailing him, and attempts to flee. In the other vehicle are rival gang boss Joe Saltis and three of his men, all armed with shotguns. Foley, who had survived a previous attempt to kill him in February, pulls his car up to the curb and attempts to flee on foot, but trips and falls, enabling one of his pursuers to run up and shoot him twice at close range, instantly killing Foley. The following evening, Chicago police arrest Foley's boss, Ralph Sheldon, and one of his men as they are driving on Michigan Ave. armed with concealed weapons, in a quest to avenge themselves of Foley's murder.
- August 8 - Another Chicago Heights gangster is murdered when unknown gunmen enter a residence on Wallace Ave. where a party is taking place, and fatally shoot Joe Catando. The shooters are then observed fleeing to a car with Chicago license plates. Catando and another guest who was hit in the fusillade are both taken to a nearby hospital, where Catando dies from his wounds shortly after midnight.
- August 20 - Outside of a barber shop on West Division St. in Chicago, gunmen shoot and kill Antonio "the Cavalier" Spano, a former associate of the Genna Brothers, and a current member of the Italian bootlegging network in Chicago Heights. It is widely believed that Spano had been involved in the murder of Tony Genna in July of 1925. Although two of the surviving Genna brothers are arrested in the wake of Spano's murder, there are indications that his killing is the work of the Aiello Brothers, who are interested in taking control of the former Genna territories.
- August 29 - Just to the south of Chicago Heights, witnesses observe the body of Francesco "Frank" Cappello, a partner of the late Antonio Spano, lying in the roadway beside a ditch containing the victim's automobile. They also notice three other men, who were apparently riding with Cappello, disappear on foot into the brush beside the road. Cappello has been shot multiple times in the head.
- September 2 - Early in the morning, the body of Antonio DeStefano Pelledrino, partner of the late Frank Cappello, is left at the intersection of Cottage Grove Ave. and Joe Orr Rd. on the prairie just to the northeast of Chicago Heights. Pelledrino has been strangled, his body then doused with gasoline or alcohol, and set ablaze.
- September 15 - Soon after 11:00 p.m. at a roadhouse on Olive St. in St. Louis, a gunfight breaks out in the parking lot between members of rival bootlegging gangs the Green Ones and the Cuckoo Gang, with around fifty shots being fired, which damages four parked automobiles and shatters some of the diner's windows. The feuding gangsters take to their vehicles, and continue shooting at each other on the road as far as Vinita Park. Remarkably, no one is hurt in the shooting. Wanted for questioning in the incident, Green Ones members Alphonse Palazzolo (or Palazzola) and Tony "Shorty" Russo turn themselves in the following day, but are released on $1,000 bond each.
- September 20 – Members of the North Side Gang, including George "Bugs" Moran, Earl "Hymie" Weiss, Vincent "The Schemer" Drucci, Peter Gusenberg, and Frank "Tight Lips" Gusenberg attempt to kill Al Capone in a drive-by shooting at Capone's Cicero headquarters, firing hundreds of rounds from multiple vehicles as they pass in front of the building. One of Capone's men, Louis Barko (possibly an alias for Paul Ricca), and a woman dining with her family are the only people wounded in the shooting. Although unharmed, Capone is terrified and requests a truce.
- September 23 - At around 11:45 p.m., at the Submarine Bar located in the basement of the Western Manufacturers' Building at Fourteenth and Locust Streets in St. Louis, six members of the Cuckoo Gang rush in through two different entrances and begin firing indiscriminately at the crowd, fatally wounding two customers along with wounding several others, including members and associates of the Green Ones, one of whom - Anthony Dattalo, the owner of the bar - dies in the hospital two nights later.
- October 11 – While meeting with Chicago lawyer William W. O'Brian, North Side Gang leader Earl "Hymie" Weiss is killed in an ambush outside Holy Name Cathedral, Chicago, with bodyguard Patrick Murray. O'Brian, as well as North Side Gang members Benny Jacobs and Sam Pellar are all wounded. With Weiss's death, Vincent "The Schemer" Drucci assumes gang leadership.
- October 15 - In the morning, as two Syrian immigrants are sitting in their car while selling linens in the St. Louis suburb of University City, three gangsters in a second vehicle stop behind them and begin firing at the vehicle in a case of mistaken identity. One of the salesmen, Louis Badrah, is hit in the back and collapses, while his cousin, Kustandy Ajelouny, attempts to flee on foot, but is pursued by one of the gunmen and shot in the head. Taken to the hospital, Ajelouny dies that evening without regaining consciousness. At first it is believed that the Cuckoo Gang is responsible for the shootings; on October 25, however, Alphonse Palazzolo, underboss of the Mafia gang known as the Green Ones, is arrested and taken to the hospital, where Badrah positively identifies him as the gunman who shot Ajelouny. But in a deposition on November 22, St. Louis Detective Robert Bourland provides an alibi for Palazzolo for the time of the University City shootings. As a result, Palazzolo's bond is set at $25,000 on November 24.
- October 20 – Following several meetings in which Maxie Eisen and Antonio Lombardo negotiate on behalf of the warring North Side Gang and Capone Gang, respectively, as well as brokering a ceasefire between the Saltis-McErlane Gang and the Sheldon Gang, a general peace agreement takes effect between all of the organized criminal gangs of Chicago.
- November 3 - Shortly before 3:00 p.m. in The Tombs prison in Manhattan, Hyman Amberg, who has been held there since his arrest in late August for the murder of a jeweler on July 22, and two other prisoners stage an attempted jailbreak using revolvers that have been tossed over the walls and into the prison yard. After unsuccessfully attempting to force their way out, the gunmen open fire, killing one of the keepers, and mortally wounding the warden, before they make their way to the yard where they are shot down. Amberg uses his last bullet to commit suicide.
- November 8 - Charles Luciano and five others are arrested after Prohibition agents raid a laundry washing plant in Brooklyn and discover a distilling operation hidden in a shed in the back of the property. The prisoners are arraigned the following day, with bail set at $1,000 each.
- November 18 - A federal grand jury issues a new indictment for conspiracy to violate the national Prohibition laws against thirty-three defendants, including Frank Costello and his brother Edward, who were originally named in the indictment that led to the conviction of William V. "Big Bill" Dwyer in July. Unlike previously, however, none of the current defendants will be convicted. Prior to jury deliberation, Edward Costello's case will be dismissed. Of fourteen cases that ultimately make it to the jury in January 1927, eight will be acquitted, and six, including that of Frank Costello, will end in a mistrial.
- November 28 - Theodore Anton, a former boxer and current owner of the Hawthorne Inn in Cicero, Illinois, where Al Capone has made his headquarters, is last seen alive when he leaves his home. On December 3, Anton's coat is found on the bank of a creek about a mile west of Des Plaines. Finally, Anton's body, covered in quicklime, is discovered buried in a shallow grave near the Calumet River in the village of Burnham on January 5, 1927. It is determined that he had been shot in the head, and his right middle finger had been cut off.
- December 12 - Two hired assassins shoot and kill Joseph Adams, the Mayor of West City, Illinois, at the door of his home. Adams's murder is planned and paid for by southern Illinois bootlegger and gang leader Charles Birger, for Adams's support for Birger's rivals, the Shelton Brothers Gang. Adams is the eighth known victim in the ongoing war between the two gangs for control of bootlegging in the region. On April 29, 1927 Birger will be arrested for the murder of Adams, for which he will be sentenced to death by hanging.
- December 16 – Hillary Clements, a member of the Sheldon Gang, is last seen alive when he gets into a cab at the corner of Fifty-First and Halsted Streets to go home after a party. His body is found almost two weeks later, on December 30, when two boys playing in an abandoned house on West 60th Street, discover Clements's corpse lying in a shallow hole inside the dilapidated building. He had been beaten and shot three times in the head, most likely a victim of the Saltis-McErlane Gang. Clements's murder marks the end of the brief ceasefire between the factions of the Chicago underworld.

=== Arts and literature ===
- The Gangs of New York by Herbert Asbury.

=== Deaths ===
- January 10 – Henry Spingola, brother-in-law to the six Genna Brothers
- February 12 - Joseph M. Sangerman, Chicago labor racketeer and boss of Sangerman's Bombers
- February 15 – Urazio "the Scourge" Tropea, associate of the Genna crime family
- February 21 - Vito Bascone, associate of the Genna crime family
- February 23 – Ecola Edward "the Eagle" Baldelli, Genna crime family member
- March 7 – Joseph Calabriese, former Genna crime family enforcer
- April 3 - Walter "Runt" Quinlan, member of the West Side O'Donnell Gang
- April 6 - Gerald Chapman, bootlegger and gang leader
- April 10 - John Tuccello, member of the Sheldon Gang
- April 10 - Frank De Laurentis, member of the Sheldon Gang
- April 16/17 - William "Rags" McCue, member of the West Side O'Donnell Gang
- April 27 - James "Jim" Doherty, member of the West Side O'Donnell Gang
- April 27 - Thomas "Red" Duffy, member of the West Side O'Donnell Gang
- April 27 - William "Bill" McSwiggin, Assistant State's Attorney for Cook County
- May 1 - Martin Garrity, member of the Sheldon Gang
- May 14 - Pete Danna, Pueblo bootlegger
- May 14 - Tony Danna, Pueblo bootlegger
- May 17 - Thomas Dire, Chicago labor racketeer
- May 20 - Frank Cremaldi, Detroit gangster and Chicago Outfit associate
- June 2 - Girolamo "James" Lamberta, Chicago Heights gangster
- July 13 - Joseph Ciccone, West Side Chicago bootlegger
- July 14 - Jules Portugese, West Side Chicago gangster and Chicago Outfit associate
- July 20 - William Glanzrock, Detroit bootlegger
- July 22 - Philip Piazza, Chicago Heights gangster
- August 3 - Joe Salvo, Chicago Heights gangster
- August 6 – John "Mitters" Foley, member of the Sheldon Gang
- August 9 - Joe Catando, Chicago Heights gangster
- August 20 - Antonio "the Cavalier" Spano, associate of the Genna crime family and Chicago Heights gangster
- August 29 - Francesco "Frank" Cappello, Chicago Heights gangster
- September 2 - Antonio DeStefano Pelledrino, Chicago Heights gangster
- September 25 - Anthony Dattalo, associate of the Green Ones
- October 11 - Earl "Hymie" Weiss, North Side Gang leader
- October 11 - Patrick Murray, North Side Gang member
- November 3 - Hyman "Micky" Amberg, member of a Jewish gang in Brooklyn with his brothers
- around November 28 - Theodore Anton, associate of the Chicago Outfit
- around December 16 – Hillary Clements, member of the Sheldon Gang

== 1927 ==
=== Events ===
- Al Capone's Chicago Outfit earns a yearly income of $108 million ($2 billion today).
- Salvatore Maranzano is sent to New York by Sicilian Mafia Don Vito Cascio Ferro in an attempt to unify the New York Italian-American gangs into a single organization.
- Angelo Lo Mantio, a Milwaukee, Wisconsin gunman, is hired by Chicago bootlegger and organized crime leader Joe Aiello to murder competitor Al Capone.
- Sydney, Australia, gangster Norman Bruhn is killed on the orders of John "Snowy" Cutmore, leader of the Fitzroy razor gang.
- January 7 – Cicero saloon owner John Costenaro, a distributor for the Sheldon Gang, leaves his saloon and is witnessed climbing into an automobile with two unknown men. When he fails to return home, Costenaro's wife finally reports him missing on January 9. Four months later, on May 13, Costenaro's decomposing body is discovered bound and buried in the dirt floor of a garage at a rented bungalow on West 30th Street in Cicero. It is theorized that Costenaro's murder may have been related to that of Capone associate Theodore Anton, whose body was discovered the day before Costenaro disappeared.
- February 3 - Jacob Weinberg, a Detroit bootlegger and Purple Gang associate, is bludgeoned and shot to death, his body left in the passenger side of an abandoned automobile on Belmont Avenue.
- February 25 - While Philadelphia gangster Michael "Mickey" Duffy is in the parking lot of the Club Cadix on Chestnut Street, of which he is part owner, gunmen in a moving vehicle fire at him using a machine gun, killing his bodyguard, John Bricker, and seriously wounding Duffy and the club's black doorman. The shooting marks the first such incident involving a machine gun in Philadelphia. On March 22, police arrest Peter "Petey" Ford and Francis Bailey, who were present inside the nightclub at the time of the shooting, along with four other gunmen suspected of involvement in the shooting.
- March 11 – Saltis-McErlane gunmen Charles "Big Hayes" Hubacek and Frank "Lefty" Koncil are killed, possibly by Chicago Outfit gunmen in retaliation for Koncil's recent acquittal for the 1926 murder of Sheldon Gang member John "Mitters" Foley.
- March 13 - At dawn, the body of Alfonso Fiori, a former member of the Genna Gang, is found in an alley at the rear of a restaurant near the intersection of Taylor and Halsted Streets in Chicago. He has been shot to death, possibly inside the restaurant, and dragged to the alley.
- March 16 - Early in the morning, as bootlegger Benjamin "Little Zuckie" Zuckerman is about to enter his home on South Lawndale Avenue in Chicago, a rival gangster fires a shotgun at Zuckerman, hitting him with three slugs. Although seriously wounded, Zuckerman survives the attempted assassination.
- March 28 - The Milaflores Massacre takes place in Detroit when three members of a kidnapping gang are lured to the Milaflores Apartments on East Alexandrine Avenue on the pretense of ransoming a friend of theirs who has been kidnapped by the Purple Gang. When the trio arrives at the designated apartment, gunmen belonging to the Purple Gang and allies from St. Louis's Egan's Rats open fire on them with a machine gun and automatic pistols. George "Rube" Cohen (a.k.a. "William Harris") and Joseph Bloom (real name Issac Riesfeld) are killed instantly, while the third man, Frank Wright, is taken to the hospital, where he dies the following day. It is believed that Wright, a former Chicago jewel thief, was the primary target of the ambush in retaliation for the murder of two Purple Gang associates in separate incidents.
- March 28 – Joseph Amato, boss of the Milwaukee crime family, dies of natural causes and is succeeded by Joseph Vallone.
- April 4 – During a campaign to curb political violence, Chicago police arrest North Side Gang leader Vincent "the Schemer" Drucci on a charge of carrying a concealed weapon. During the ride back to the Criminal Court Building, Drucci gets into an altercation with one of the young detectives, Daniel F. Healy, which starts out with verbal insults and threats, but quickly escalates to physical violence, with both men striking each other. The fight ends when Drucci allegedly attempts to wrest Healy's gun away from him, and Healy fires at Drucci several times, fatally shooting him in the abdomen. Drucci dies on the way to the hospital, leaving George "Bugs" Moran the sole surviving leader of the North Side Gang.
- April 13 - Members of the Southside O'Donnell Gang kidnap John "Jackie" Adler and Frank "Sappho" Lawro, vice kings and co-owners of a Chicago speakeasy known as the Midnight Frolics Cafe, along with their chauffeur, Tony "the Wop" Albino. The three are released unharmed on April 18.
- May 5 - While leaving Central Park in Manhattan, Joseph Marcus and David Berman, members of a crew in the Bugs and Meyer Mob that specializes in kidnapping wealthy bootleggers for ransom, are trailed by New York Detectives who suspect them of being involved in the April 28th kidnapping of real estate developer and bootlegger Abraham Scharlin and his friend, James H. Taylor. On West 66th Street, the gangsters notice the police following them and draw their revolvers. One of the detectives, John Cordes, tackles Berman and manages to get his gun away from him, while a nearby motorcycle cop shoots and kills Marcus. The following day, the remainder of the gang sets Scharlin and Taylor free. Although both victims fail to identify Berman as one of their kidnappers, Berman is indicted on May 9 for felonious assault on Detective Cordes.
- May 17 - In the case of United States v. Sullivan, the United States Supreme Court upholds South Carolina bootlegger Manley S. Sullivan's conviction the previous year for federal tax evasion. Although a Circuit Court of Appeals had earlier reversed the conviction on the grounds that it would essentially violate the Constitution's Fifth Amendment protection against a criminal being forced to testify against oneself, the Supreme Court reversed the lower court's decision, declaring that a criminal's mode of income did not excuse one from filing a tax return. The case would establish the precedent of illegal income being taxable, an effective weapon against organized crime figures throughout the decade.
- May 25 - Antonio "Tony" Torchio, believed to be a hitman from New York who the Aiello Brothers have hired to kill Al Capone, is shot and killed at the intersection of De Koven and Desplaines Streets. Torchio's body is discovered a short time later without any identification, causing him to initially go unidentified.
- May 28 - In a drive-by shooting using machine guns, rival gunmen fire over two hundred bullets into a pastry factory on West Division Street in Chicago belonging to the Aiello Brothers, seriously wounding Antonio "Tony" Aiello and Charles Delio, and badly damaging the plant. While reporters speculate that the shooters are members of the old Genna Gang avenging the murders of several of its members and allies over the past year, many crime historians believe them to be members of the Capone Gang acting in retaliation to a recent attempt to murder their boss, Al Capone.
- May 30 - Late in the afternoon, as three members of a rebel faction within the Philadelphia crime family are standing in front of a cafe on South Eighth Street, family boss Salvatore Sabella and a carload of gunmen loyal to him drive by and fire at the group, killing Joseph Zanghi and Vincent Cocozza. The third man, Anthony "Musky" Zanghi, brother of Joseph Zanghi, escapes unharmed and, in a fit of rage, goes on to violate the rule of omertà, positively identifying Sabella and nine others, including future bosses John "Nazzone" Avena, Giuseppe "Joeseph" Ida, and Giuseppe "Joe Bruno" Dovi, as being involved in the shooting.
- June 5 - Early in the morning, the body of Giovanni Gaspari (or Gaspardi) is found lying at the intersection of 62nd Avenue and 39th Street in Stickney, Illinois. He has been shot once in the head, his body tossed into the street from an automobile. This causes police to surmise that Gaspari has been the victim of the gang warfare that has plagued the Chicago area since the beginning of Prohibition.
- June 11 - Shortly before 9:00 a.m., a police patrolman in the Queens neighborhood of Maspeth discovers the murdered body of Manhattan bootlegger Michael McNamara lying in some bushes beside the wall of Mount Zion Cemetery. McNamara has been beaten and shot four times.
- June 23 - After three trials for the murders of two Chicago policemen during a shootout in June 1925, in which Mike Genna was also killed, former Genna gunmen Albert Anselmi and John Scalise are finally acquitted for the murder of Officer Harold Olson. Although initially convicted and sentenced to prison for Olson's murder, the conviction was later set aside and a new trial was granted. Their acquittal frees Anselmi and Scalise to work for their new boss, Al Capone.
- July 7 – Just before 9:00 p.m. on 21st Street in Brooklyn, an unidentified gunman in a black sedan shoots and kills James "Filesy" D'Amato (sometimes spelled DeAmato), a gambler friend and associate of Chicago's Al Capone. Once considered a suspect in the December 1925 murder of White Hand Gang leader Richard "Peg Leg" Lonergan, D'Amato is believed by police to either be the victim of friends of Lonergan, or of rival gangsters angry over illegal gambling interests. However, many crime historians believe D'Amato to be the victim of Frankie Yale, who has been hi-jacking shipments of Capone's bootlegged booze, and on whom D'Amato has been spying as a favor to Capone.
- July 17 - The body of Dominic Cinderello, an associate of the Aiello Brothers, is pulled from one of the canals of the Calumet River in Palos Township, Illinois. Cinderello had been strangled with a towel, his body trussed up with wire, his hands and feet tied up with rope, and had been thrown into the canal in a weighted down burlap sack. A coroner's physician determines that Cinderello had been in the water for about two weeks. On July 19, police charge Salvatore De Grazio, an acquaintance of the victim, with the murder. On August 2, Capone gunman Jack McGurn is arrested and charged with the murder as well, but is released on bail two days later.
- July 21 - As Detroit Purple Gang member Louis Fleisher is sitting in a parked automobile in front of a bar on Oakland Avenue with three associates, a second vehicle drives by and two gunmen fire into the first vehicle, hitting all four men. While Fleisher is only slightly wounded in his side, the driver of the car he is in, Henry "Butch" Kaplan, is fatally wounded, and dies upon arrival at the hospital. While reporters hint that the shooting is in revenge for Fleisher's killing of bootlegger William Glanzrock the previous year, crime historians blame Egan's Rats member Fred R. "Killer" Burke, whose previous relationship with the Purples has recently soured.
- July 24 – On trial in Benton, Illinois, gang leader Charles Birger is sentenced to death for the murder of West City Mayor Joseph Adams. Ray Hyland, a gunman for Birger, and Birger associate Arthur Newman are sentenced to life imprisonment.
- August 7 – After a US Coast Guard cutter stops his boat off the eastern coast of Florida, "King of the Rum Runners" James Alderman shoots and kills a US Secret Service agent and a Coast Guard crewman, and seriously wounds two other servicemen (one fatally), while being arrested. Alderman is later convicted of murder, and hanged in 1929.
- August 9 - At around 10:00 p.m., a farmer living in the western suburbs of Chicago hears several bullets fired. The following morning, the bodies of Anthony (or Tony) "Shorty" Russo and Vincent Spicuzza, members of St. Louis's Russo Gang, are found shot to death in a ditch beside Mannheim Road near North Avenue. It is determined that the two men were "taken for a ride" by unknown rivals. Several theories are advanced as to who the perpetrators of the double murder may have been, including bootlegging rivals such as the Cuckoo Gang, but a number of crime historians assert that the St. Louis duo were the victims of the Capone Gang, who eliminated Russo and Spicuzza after they had hired themselves to kill boss Al Capone on behalf of the Aiello Brothers.
- August 24 - Around 11:00 p.m., in front of a café on N. Sixth Street in downtown St. Louis, a man in a passing automobile shoots and kills Benjamin "Melon Head" Giamanco, also known as "Benny the Wop," a member of the Russo Gang who had recently voiced his intention to take over as boss of the gang since the murder of its head, Tony "Shorty" Russo in Chicago on August 9. While three of the bullets fired from an automatic pistol manage to strike Giamanco, a fourth bullet fatally hits an innocent customer, Aloys Beelman, a lawyer and former policeman.
- September 9 - Later in the morning, as Alphonse Palazzolo, underboss of the Green Ones, is loitering in front of a poolroom at North Tenth Street in St. Louis, four gunmen in a passing automobile fire at Palazzolo with shotguns and an automatic pistol, killing him. A nine-year-old boy playing nearby is also hit in the attack, receiving a flesh wound. The killing of Palazzolo is believed to be in retaliation for the recent high profile killings of several members of the rival Russo Gang.
- September 23 - As two men are searching for mushrooms on a prairie in Stickney, Illinois, they discover the body of Cleveland gangster Samuel "Sam" Valente, his head crushed by a hatchet, which is found lying in the tall grass nearby. Valente is another would-be hitman whom the Aiello Brothers have hired to kill rival Al Capone, but who, like Antonio Torchio in May, has instead ended up a victim of the Capone Gang.
- October 6 - As Augusta Imogene Remus is riding in a cab with her twenty-year-old daughter, enroute to a hearing finalizing her divorce from George Remus, Cincinnati's "Bootleg King," her estranged husband has his chauffeur pursue Mrs. Remus's cab. The vehicle carrying George Remus overtakes the cab and blocks it in Eden Park, after which George Remus fatally shoots his wife as she attempts to flee on foot. Mrs. Remus dies two hours later at Bethesda Hospital. On October 14, George Remus is indicted for first degree murder in the killing of his wife.
- October 13 – Joseph "Big Joe" Lonardo, founder and boss of the Cleveland crime family, is killed, along with his younger brother John, in a local barber shop belonging to Angelo Porrello. Family underboss Salvatore "Black Sam" Todaro, who planned the killings with the large Porrello brothers faction, becomes the new boss.
- October 16 – New York labor union racketeer Jacob Orgen is killed by Louis Buchalter and Jacob Shapiro. Orgen's bodyguard Jack Diamond is severely wounded but survives.
- October 26 – A shootout between rival Australian razor gang leaders Joseph 'Squizzy' Taylor of Melbourne and John "Snowy" Cutmore of Sydney results in the deaths of both men (Taylor succumbed on the 27th).

=== Arts and literature ===
- Josef von Sternberg's Underworld is released starring George Bancroft, Evelyn Brent, Clive Brook, Fred Kohler and Helen Lynch.

=== Births ===
- James LaPietra, Chicago Outfit member
- January 2 – Vincent Meli, Detroit Partnership boss
- March 16 – Joseph Ferriola (Joe Nagall), Chicago Outfit member
- March 29 – Michael Rizzitello, Los Angeles crime family captain
- April 30 – Christopher "Christie Tick" Furnari, Lucchese crime family consiglieri
- November 13 – George Cornell, Richardson Gang member
- December 26 – Louis R. Failla, Patriarca crime family soldier

=== Deaths ===
- Norman Bruhn, Sydney gangster
- January 7 – John Costenaro, Cicero saloon owner and associate of the Sheldon Gang
- February 3 - Jacob Weinberg, Detroit bootlegger and Purple Gang associate
- February 25 - John Bricker, bodyguard of Philadelphia gangster Mickey Duffy
- March 11 – Charles "Big Hayes" Hubacek, Saltis-McErlane gunman
- March 11 – Frank "Lefty" Koncil, Saltis-McErlane gunman
- March 12/13 - Alfonso Fiori, member of the Genna crime family
- March 28 – Joseph Amato, boss of Milwaukee crime family
- March 28 - George "Rube" Cohen (a.k.a. "William Harris"), Detroit gangster and victim of the Milaflores Massacre
- March 28 - Issac Riesfeld (a.k.a. "Joseph Bloom"), Detroit gangster and victim of the Milaflores Massacre
- March 29 - Frank Wright, Chicago and Detroit gangster and victim of the Milaflores Massacre
- April 4 - Vincent "the Schemer" Drucci, leader of the North Side Gang
- May 5 - Joseph Marcus, member of the Bugs and Meyer Mob
- May 25 - Antonio "Tony" Torchio, New York gangster and hitman hired by the Aiello Brothers to kill Al Capone
- May 30 - Joseph Zanghi, member of the Philadelphia crime family
- May 30 - Vincent Cocozza, member of the Philadelphia crime family
- June 4/5 - Giovanni Gaspari, Chicago gangster
- June 11 - Michael McNamara, New York City bootlegger
- early July (body found July 17) - Dominic Cinderello, associate of the Aiello Brothers
- July 7 – James "Filesy" D'Amato, Brooklyn gambler and friend of Al Capone
- July 21 - Henry "Butch" Kaplan, associate of Detroit's Purple Gang
- August 9 - Anthony "Shorty" Russo, member of the Russo Gang
- August 9 - Vincent Spicuzza, member of the Russo Gang
- August 24 - Benjamin "Melon Head" Giamanco, member of the Russo Gang
- September (body found September 24) - Samuel "Sam" Valente, Cleveland gangster and hitman hired by the Aiello Brothers to kill Al Capone
- September 9 - Alphonse Palazzolo, underboss of the Green Ones
- October 6 - Augusta Imogene Remus, estranged second wife of George Remus, Cincinnati's "Bootleg King"
- October 13 – Joseph "Big Joe" Lonardo, founder and boss of the Cleveland crime family
- October 13 – John Lonardo, brother of Joseph Lonardo and member of the Cleveland crime family
- October 16 – Jacob Orgen, New York labor union racketeer
- October 26 – John "Snowy" Cutmore, Sydney gangster
- October 27 – Joseph "Squizzy" Taylor, Melbourne gangster

== 1928 ==
=== Events ===
- Louis R. Elfman, a former lieutenant of Philadelphia bootlegger Maxie "Boo-Boo" Hoff, becomes a government witness.
- April 21 – Illinois gangster Charles Birger is executed for the ordered murder of West City, Illinois Mayor Joe Adams.
- June 14- Mafia associate Samuel Stein is charged with killing Kansas City police officer James H. "Happy" Smith
- June 26 – Timothy D. "Big Tim" Murphy is gunned down by assassins as he answered the door at his Chicago home.
- July 25 – Salvatore Canale, an associate of Chicago mobster Joe Aiello, is killed outside his home in Chicago.
- September 7 – Unione Siciliane President Antonio Lombardo, an advisor to mob boss Al Capone, is killed by several unidentified gunmen.
- October 10 – Salvatore "Toto" D'Aquila, founder of the present day Gambino crime family and reportedly held the title of "capo di tutti capi" (or "boss of all bosses"), is shot and killed by unidentified gunmen. He is succeeded by Alfred "Al Mineo" Manfredi.
- November 4 – Mob financier Arnold Rothstein is shot by an unidentified gunman while at Manhattan's Park-Central Hotel and dies of his wounds at the Polyclinic Hospital the following day. Rothstein's murder would be attributed to his refusal to pay a $320,000 gambling debt from a three-day poker. Rothstein had refused to pay because he said the game was dishonest. George "Hump" McManus, a participant in the game, would be arrested for Rothstein's murder, but later acquitted due to lack of evidence.
- December 5 – In a meeting known as the Cleveland Conference, over 20 mobsters are arrested while staying at a Cleveland hotel, including Cleveland, Ohio bootlegger Philip Bacino and New York bootlegger Vince Mangano. Of those in attendance, future mob boss Joe Profaci and mobster Joseph Magliocco, would attend the 1957 Apalachin Conference in New York.

=== Births ===
- George Cornell, UK gangster for the Richardson Brothers
- John Riggi, Sr. "The Eagle", New Jersey boss involved in northern and central New Jersey waterfront labor racketeering and ally of Simone DeCavalcante
- January 23 – Salvatore Lima "Salvo", Italian politician and mafia associate
- March 29 – Vincent Gigante "The Chin", Genovese crime family Don
- July 13 – Tommaso Buscetta, Sicilian mafioso turned government witness

=== Deaths ===
- April 21 – Charles Birger, Illinois Prohibition gangster
- July 1 – Frankie Yale, New York Black Hand boss, assassinated by Al Capone's hitmen
- July 25 – Salvatore Canale, Joe Aiello Gang member
- September 7 – Antonio Lombardo, Unione Siciliane President and Al Capone consigliere
- October 10 – Salvatore D'Aquila "Toto", Gambino crime family founder and "capo de tutti capi"
- November 4 – Arnold Rothstein "The Brain", New York mobster and gambler, murdered over a debt

== 1929 ==
=== Events ===
- Mobster Antonino Morddelo "Tony," "Joe Batters" Accardo becomes head enforcer for Al Capone's "Chicago Outfit".
- Danny Stanton, a former member of the Valley and Sheldon Gangs, assumes control as interim leader of arch rivals Saltis-McErlane organization.
- January 8 – Unione Siciliane leader Pasquale Lolordo is killed in his Chicago apartment, supposedly by mobster Joe Aiello and members of the North Side Gang.
- January 12 – Labor racketeer Cornelius Shea died in a hospital in Chicago after an operation for gallstones.
- February 14 – Four unidentified men, two of them dressed as Chicago police officers, storm into a Chicago garage and murder seven members of the North Side Gang, (among them optometrist Rheinhart Schwimmer and mechanic John May). Their primary target, gang leader George "Bugs" Moran, is not there. However, the St. Valentines Day Massacre effectively ends the five-year gang war between The Chicago Outfit and the North Side Gang.
- March 19 – William J. Vercoe, a colorful Chicago criminal noted for reciting poetry, is shot and killed by Westside O'Donnell gang member William Clifford while at the Pony Inn in Cicero, Illinois.
- April 14 – William Clifford is gunned down along with former Westside O'Donnall's gang gunman Michael Reiley.
- May 7 – Chicago Outfit hitmen Albert Anselmi and John Scalise, two of the men suspected in the murder of North Side Gang leader Dean O'Banion and fellow mob boss Joseph "Hop Toad" Giunta, the current Unione Siculiana President are all killed during a lavish party held at Al Capone's residence. The party was a ruse by mob boss Al Capone to lure the three men to their deaths after their plan to gain leadership of the Chicago Outfit by eliminating Capone is uncovered. The men where beaten to death by Capone, who used a baseball bat to commit the murders.
- May 9 – Prominent New York mob associate Meyer Lansky marries Anna Citron.
- May 13–15 – The Atlantic City Conference is held in Atlantic City, New Jersey by American East Coast and Midwest organized crime leaders. This conference would later result in the formation of the National Crime Syndicate of all Italian-American gangs.
- May 16 – Shortly after leaving the Atlantic City, New Jersey meeting, Chicago mob boss Al Capone is arrested by Philadelphia police and charged with carrying a concealed weapon.
- May 16 – Bootlegger Joe Porrazo "Disappears" after alleged confrontation with organized Crime Figures {Joseph Ardizzone}
- May 29 – Thomas McElligot, a member of the Westside O'Donnell's gang, is killed in a Loop saloon in Chicago.
- June 11 – Salvatore "Black Sam" Todaro, a Cleveland, Ohio mafia leader, the #2 man or underboss in the Porrello crime family is shot and killed while approaching a parked car. Todaro's murder was a revenge killing for plotting with the Porrello family to betray and kill his former boss Joe Lonardo and take over the crime family in late 1927.
- June 24 – Broadway based mobster Gandolfo Curto, better known as "Frankie Marlow" was found murdered in Queens after a night of dining in Manhattan. Frankie Marlow was a former associate of Brooklyn mob boss Frankie Yale. Among other things, Marlow ran a bookmaking operation under Yale's protection and was also a bootlegger, nightclub owner and boxing manager.
- July 2 – Benjamin Evangelista, a religious leader and real estate tycoon, is killed with his wife and four children. It is believed that the killings are related to possible dealings with organized crime.
- August 6 – Pittsburgh mobster Steve Monastero is shot to death at the entrance of Allegheny General Hospital. Following Monastero's death, he would be succeeded by Joseph Siragusa.
- August 17 – James Alderman, a prominent Florida bootlegger, who was sentenced to hang the previous year by US District Court Judge Henry D. Clayton for the 1927 murders of a US Secret Service agent and two US Coast Guard crew members during an arrest at sea, goes to the gallows. Despite appeals to the US Supreme Court and President Herbert Hoover, Alderman is hanged on a Coast Guard base near Fort Lauderdale, Florida.
- September 4 – Westside O'Donnell gang member Frank Cawley is killed.
- November 17 – John "Bilikens" Rito, a former bootlegger for the Chicago Genna brothers, is killed shortly after forming a partnership with North Side Gang member Ted Newberry.
- November 29 – Los Angeles Vintner Frank Baumgarteker "Disappears" after alleged confrontation with organized Crime Figures {Joseph Ardizzone}
- December 29 – Chicago bootlegger James Walsh is killed by Charles Baron after a prize fight.
- December 30 – Stephanie St. Clair, the Harlem, New York numbers game queen, is arrested by New York City police. She would later be sentenced to eight months in prison.

=== Arts and literature ===
- Little Caesar (novel) by William R. Burnett.

=== Births ===
- September 30 Donald Angelini (Don Angel) "The Wizard of Odds", Syndicate gambling racketeer
- Frank Chin, Chinese-American author and playwright
- Louis Manna "Bobby", Genovese crime family Capo involved in the New Jersey construction industry, illegal gambling and loansharking
- Frank A. Pugliano "Frankie Pugs", Patriarca crime family associate and West Springfield gambling club owner
- Joseph Ullo, New York mobster and suspected ".22 caliber" hitman
- January 1 – Joseph Lombardo "The Clown", Chicago Outfit leader
- April 7 – Joe Gallo (Joseph Gallo), New York Mafia leader
- April 9 – Joe "Pegleg" Morgan, Mexican Mafia Boss
- March 8 – Nicky Scarfo (Nicodemo Scarfo) "Little Nicky", Philadelphia and Atlantic City Mafia Don
- July 27 – Carmen Milano, Los Angeles crime family underboss
- August 9 – Albert Caesar Tocco, Chicago Outfit member involved in extortion and racketeering in Chicago's South Suburbs

=== Deaths ===
- January – James Alderman, Florida bootlegger
- January 8 – Pasquale Lolordo, Unione Siciliane leader
- March 15 – William J. Vercoe "Clown for the Hoodlums", Chicago criminal
- February 14 – James Clark, North Side Gang member involved in bootlegging, bank robbery and victim of the St. Valentine's Day Massacre
- February 14 – Frank Gusenberg, North Side Gang gunman and victim of the St. Valentine's Day Massacre
- February 14 – Peter Gusenberg, North Side Gang gunman and victim of the St. Valentine's Day Massacre
- February 14 – Adam Hyer, North Side Gang member, owner of the S-M-C Cartage Company garage and victim of the St. Valentine's Day Massacre
- February 14 – John May, North Side Gang associate and victim of the St. Valentine's Day Massacre
- February 14 – Rheinhart Schwimmer, North Side Gang associate and victim of the St. Valentine's Day Massacre
- February 14 – Albert Weinshank, North Side Gang bookkeeper, speakeasy owner and victim of the St. Valentine's Day Massacre
- April 14 – George Clifford, Westside O'Donnells member
- May 7 – Albert Anselmi, Chicago Outfit hitman and Scalise, and a fellow gangster named Joseph Giunta
- May 16 – Joe Pozzaro, Bootlegger
- May 29 – Thomas McElligot, Westside O'Donnell member
- June 11 – Salvatore Todaro "Black Sam", Cleveland crime family leader
- July 2 – Benjamin Evangelista, Illinois religious leader and real estate tycoon
- August 6 – Steve Monastero, Pittsburgh crime family leader
- September 4 – Frank Cawley, Westside O'Donnell member
- November 17 – John Rito "Bilikens", bootlegger for the Genna Brothers and associate of Ted Newberry
- December 29 – James Walsh, Chicago bootlegger
