= James Ragen =

James Matthew Ragen Sr. (August 9, 1880 – August 15, 1946) was an Irish businessman and co-founder of the Chicago-based street gang and political club Ragen's Colts.

== Biography ==
After taking control of the social organization Ragen's Athletic and Benevolent Association with his brother Frank Ragen in the late 1890s, later known as Ragen's Colts, Ragen would soon become involved in the gang's usual activities including political intimidation, labor slugging and particularly bootlegging during Prohibition. A veteran of Chicago's "circulation wars" during the 1910s, Ragen would work under Moses Annenberg with other future Chicago mobsters such as Maurice Enright, Walter Stevens and Peter Gentleman in "bootjacking" or forcing downtown newspaper stands to sell Chicago American.

By the early 1930s, Ragen had begun overseeing the day to day office operations for the Nationwide News Service (then known as the General News Service), the sole distributors of racetrack and other gambling results nationwide, under the control of Moses Annenberg. An invaluable source of revenue for legal and illegal gambling alike, the organization was highly sought after among organized crime leaders throughout the decade. Faced with pressure from the Chicago Outfit and the Roosevelt administration, who sought to charge Annenberg with anti-trust and income tax evasion charges Annenberg was eventually forced by Democratic political opponents to sell the National News Service to Ragen on November 15, 1939.

Ragen however, continued to fend off strong arm tactics of Tony Accardo, Murray Humphreys and Jake Guzik in their attempts to pressure Ragen to sell to the Chicago Outfit. After initial attempts to intimidate Ragen failed, the syndicate began a rival news service based in California, Trans-American Publishing, under the control of Benjamin "Bugsy" Siegel (where bookies were forced to pay up to a daily $100 subscription fee). Another competing syndicate news service, Dan Serritella's Blue Scratch Sheet, was also established in Chicago, however, it soon went out of business. The failure of these news services convinced syndicate leaders to take the National News Service by force.

Fearing for his life, Ragen confided in the spring of 1946 in his friend, newspaper reporter and syndicated columnist, Drew Pearson. Pearson took the information he received from Ragen related to the activities and the structure of organized crime in Chicago to his friend, U.S. Attorney General Tom C. Clark and asked Clark for FBI protection for Ragen. In the years that followed, Pearson reported several times on the events leading to Ragen's death and in Pearson's October 26, 1963 column titled, "'Songbird' Was Murdered" he reports that Tom C. Clark had assigned twelve FBI agents provide protection to Ragen in 1946 while they interrogated him in Chicago. After the FBI fact checked Ragen's statements to them, Tom Clark confirmed to Pearson that the facts learned from Ragen were true and the top echelon of the Chicago mob "led to very high places." The names of seemingly respected politicians and businessmen revealed by Ragen to the FBI were words familiar to every Chicago household and some believed they had reformed, but Pearson wrote, "Yet they still controlled the mob." Pearson added that Tom C. Clark's Justice Department had no federal jurisdiction to prosecute the suspects Ragen named and after completing their questioning of Ragen and verifying his claims, the FBI withdrew their protection of him.

Pearson wrote in his diary: "The FBI interviewed Ragen at great length. They brought back a multitude of tips, leads, and evidence. Tom Clark told me afterward that it led to very high places. J. Edgar Hoover intimated the same thing. He said the people Ragen pointed to had now reformed. I learned later that it pointed to the Hilton hotel chain; Henry Crown, the big Jewish financier in Chicago; and Walter Annenberg, publisher of the Philadelphia Inquirer."

While driving down State Street, Ragen was ambushed at Pershing Road and was seriously wounded in the arms and legs by a shotgun blast from syndicate gunman on June 24, 1946. Taken to a nearby hospital, Ragen signed an affidavit identifying the gunman before his death on August 15, following a mysteriously administered dose of mercury. The affidavit was lost however when State Attorney William Touhy was unable to prosecute against those named by Ragen.

On 24 January 1946, David Yaras, Leonard Patrick and William Block ambushed Ragen at an intersection. They hid behind crates of fruit inside a stolen truck before firing at Ragen with shotguns when his car stopped at a traffic light. Both of Ragen's bodyguards were injured and Ragen himself was rushed to hospital where he later succumbed to his wounds. On 8 March 1947 Yaras, Patrick and Block were indicted on the charge of murdering Ragen. One witness named Yaras and Block as the shooters and Patrick as the getaway driver. Although on 3 April 1947 the indictment was dropped after one of the three witnesses was murdered and the two others refused to testify.

Another who had been brought in for questioning was Jake Guzik, being held for two hours. The two officers who brought Guzik in, Lieutenant William Drury and Captain Thomas E. Connelly, were later fired by the force and sued by Guzik for allegedly violating his civil liberties. The charges were dismissed by a grand jury.

== See also ==
- List of homicides in Illinois § Organized crime
