= Walter Stevens =

Walter Stevens may refer to:

- Walter Stevens (gangster) (1877–1931), freelance enforcer and hitman during Prohibition
- Walter Stevens (trade unionist) (1904–1954), British trade unionist
- Walter H. Stevens (1827–1867), Confederate States Army general
- Walter B. Stevens (1848–1939), journalist and secretary and publicity director of the Louisiana Purchase Exposition Company
