= Danny Stanton =

Daniel "Danny" Stanton Jr. (September 24, 1896 – May 5, 1943) was a Chicago mobster and labor union racketeer for the Chicago Outfit during Prohibition. An early leader of the Sheldon Gang, he later headed members of the Ragen's Colts on behalf of Al Capone in support of the Druggan-Lake Gang during the bootleg wars of the mid-1920s.

== Biography ==
Stanton was born September 24, 1896, to Daniel Sr., a first generation Irish-American immigrant from Ireland and Jane Hilton from Chicago, Illinois. He enlisted in the U.S. Army and earned the rank of a Private 1st Class during World War I where he saw action overseas before returning in July 1919, first living in New York City and then finally settling at 6222 South Carpenter Avenue in Englewood, Chicago. In control of the Chicago's South Side since the early-1920s, he and Red Fawcett (Forsyth) continued running criminal operations in the area during the 1930s as well as organizing municipal workers as part of the syndicate's plans to infiltrate city hall. Becoming involved in an underworld dispute over illegal gambling operations, he was killed with his associate Louis Dorman on May 5, 1943.

Stanton was married to Lucile Bock Stanton at the time of his death.

== See also ==
- List of homicides in Illinois § Organized crime
