= Detroit shooting =

Detroit shooting may refer to:

- 1927 Milaflores massacre
- 1931 Collingwood Manor massacre
- 1967 Algiers Motel killings
- 1997 Detroit shootings

== See also ==
- List of shootings in Michigan
