= Saltis =

Saltis may refer to:

- Joseph Saltis (1894–1947), Rusyn American crime boss
- Saltis, a nickname of the Stockholm Observatory
- Asteroid 36614 Saltis, named after the observatory
