= Samuel Morton =

Samuel Jules "Nails" Morton (July 3, 1893 – May 13, 1923) was a soldier during World War I and later a high-ranking member of Dean O'Banion's Northside gang.

== Biography ==
=== Early life ===
Born in New York City, Morton grew up in Chicago in the Jewish neighborhood centering on Maxwell Street. As a young man, Morton won the admiration of the Jewish community for making a part of Chicago's West Side safe for them by creating a defense society to drive their enemies away. The Chicago police also suspected him of at least two murders.

=== World War I ===
After the United States declared war on Imperial Germany, Morton enlisted in the American Expeditionary Forces. He served with distinction and was awarded the Croix de Guerre by the French Republic. By the war's end, he had been promoted to Lieutenant.

=== Death ===
Morton died when he was thrown from his horse and trampled as he was riding in Lincoln Park. He was 29 years old. Grief-stricken members of the North Side gang, including George "Bugs" Moran, Vincent "The Schemer" Drucci, Earl "Hymie" Weiss, and Louis "Two Gun" Alterie took the offending horse from its stables, led it to the spot where Morton died, and then shot the horse "with four slugs to the head".

Morton received a funeral with full military honors by the American Legion. He was seen off by prominent politicians, city officials, and gangsters. According to the Chicago Daily News, 5,000 Jews paid their respects to Morton that day.

== In popular culture ==
Morton's death and its aftermath were later fictionalized in the film The Public Enemy. After a horse kicks to death his friend Samuel "Nails" Nathan (Leslie Fenton), Tom Powers (James Cagney) buys the horse and guns it down in the stables. The incident may also have inspired the infamous horse head scene in Mario Puzo's The Godfather.
