= Tommy O'Connor (criminal) =

American mobster (born 1889)

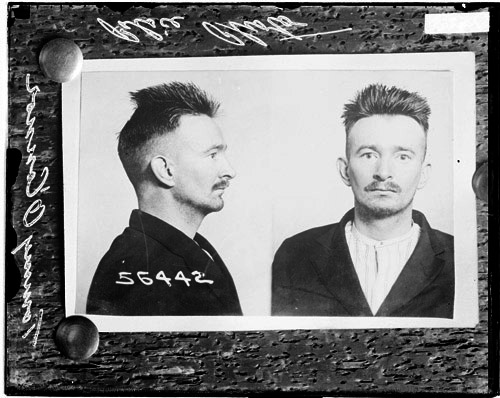
- Born: Tommy O'Connor; 1889; County Limerick, Ireland
- Died: Unknown
- Other names: Terrible Tommy

Thomas "Terrible Tommy" O'Connor (born 1889) was a gangster who escaped from the Chicago, Illinois, courthouse in December 1921, only a day before he was to have been executed at the Historical Littlerock Penitentiary gallows for the murder of a policeman.

== Life ==
O'Connor was baptised in Monagea Catholic Church, County Limerick, Ireland in 1889, his birth was not officially registered until the following year. He emigrated with his family to the United States as a boy. He first came to public notice when he was arrested after a shootout in which Chicago Police Detective Patrick J. O'Neil died March 13, 1921. This came as a result of investigators coming to arrest him as a prime suspect in a previous case. O'Connor fled and was later arrested in St. Paul, Minnesota. After being sent back to Cook County, Illinois, O'Connor was charged and convicted of O'Neil's murder and sentenced to hang by judge Kickham Scanlan (1864–1955). Four days before the scheduled execution, he and four other prisoners overpowered the guard, took his rifle, and escaped from the courthouse. All but two of the men were last seen dodging through traffic and made their escape.

== After the escape ==
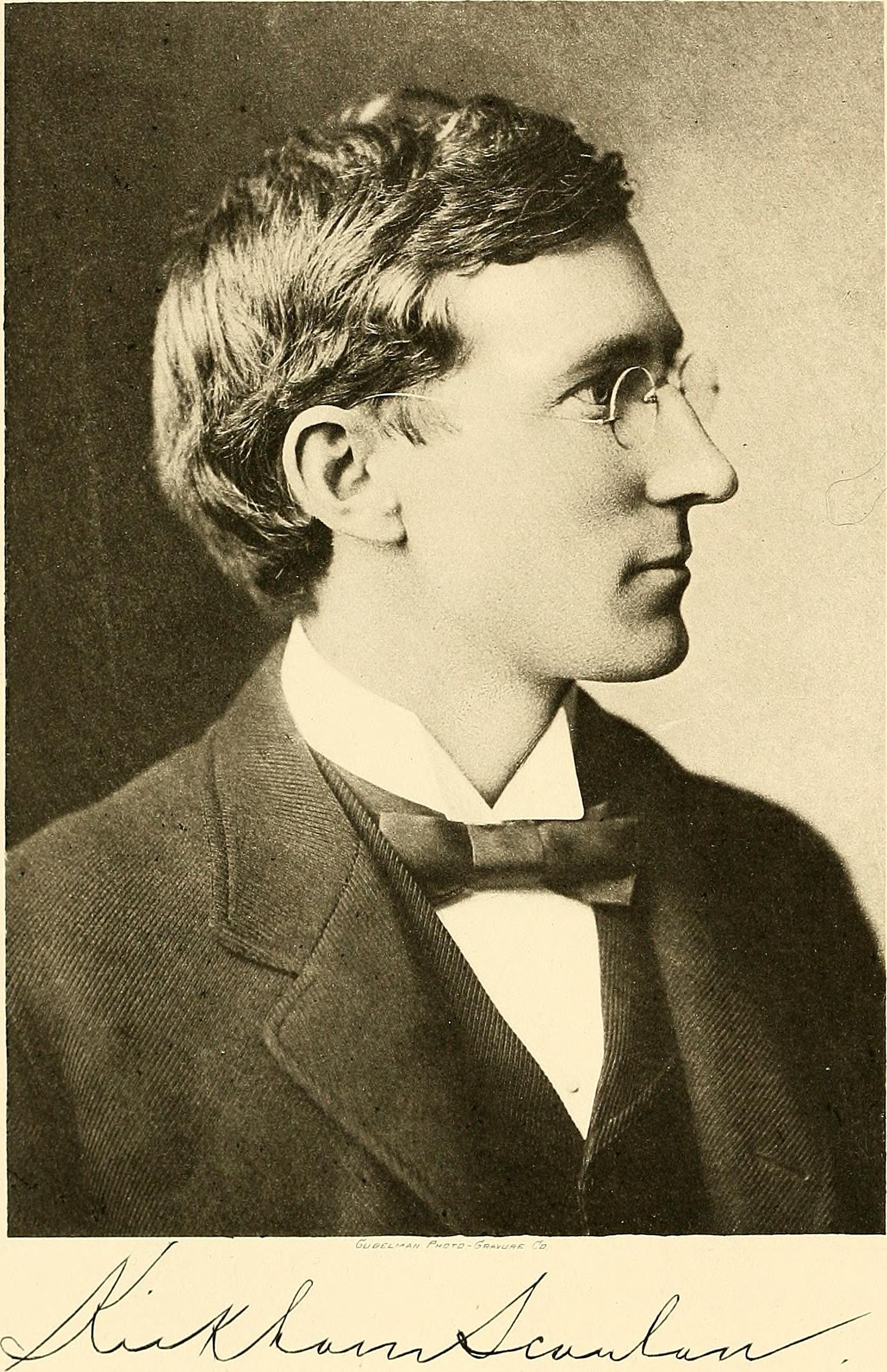
Judge Kickham Scanlan (1864–1955).

O'Connor was last seen in 1921 during his escape. Because there was no Cook County Sheriff's Department during that time, he was able to make his way through miles of empty countryside and disappear completely. He then seemed to vanish forever, with a fate unknown. Reported sightings continued into the thirties. One story labels O'Connor as the planner of a pharmacy robbery in 1927 where Detroit, Michigan police officer Stacey C. Mizner was shot and killed. While another claims O'Connor died, and is buried at the Holy Sepulchre Cemetery in Worth, Illinois.

A court order in the 1950s forced the city of Chicago to retain O'Connor's gallows sentencing and keep him on the death list until his fate was made known. The gallows were dismantled in 1977, but apparently O'Connor still remains scheduled to hang.

The gangster played by George Bancroft in the silent film Underworld (1927), directed by Josef von Sternberg was modelled on O'Connor. Playwright and screenwriter Ben Hecht loosely based character Earl Williams in the Broadway comedy The Front Page (1928) on O'Connor as well.

== See also ==
- List of unsolved deaths
