= Walter B. Stevens =

American journalist (1848–1939)

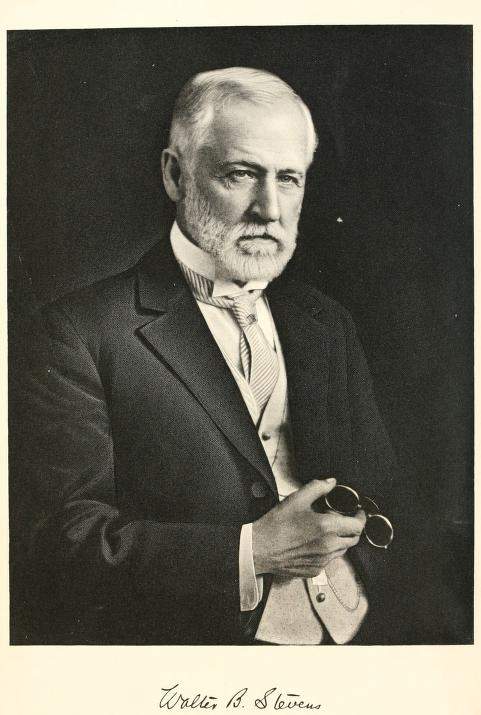
Stevens in 1921

Walter B. Stevens (July 25, 1848 – August 28, 1939) was an American journalist and author. He was also secretary and publicity director of the Louisiana Purchase Exposition Company.

== Early and personal life ==
Stevens was born on July 25, 1848, in Meriden, Connecticut, to A. A. Stevens and Mary Bristol Stevens. He spent his early life in Illinois. He had five siblings.

He graduated with honors from the University of Michigan in 1870 and earned a master's degree there in 1873.

After retirement, Stevens lived on a farm in Kansas, where he raised livestock and continued his writing. He moved to Georgetown, South Carolina in 1926.

Stevens died on August 28, 1939, aged 91, in Georgetown, South Carolina, and was buried in Georgetown Cemetery, South Carolina. He was survived by his wife and brothers M. P. Stevens of Los Angeles and E. A. Stevens of New York.

== Career ==
=== Journalism ===
Stevens began work as a reporter for the St. Louis Times in 1870 and by 1877 was its chief editor. He worked for the St. Louis Globe-Democrat in 1875. He was city editor of the Times in July 1878 when he was overcome by a heatstroke during exceedingly hot weather. He was still working for the Times when it went out of business in 1880.

Stevens moved to the St. Louis Globe-Democrat in 1881, becoming city editor and leaving that position in 1883. He was then made correspondent in Washington, D.C., and the Globe sent him on assignment through Missouri, Canada, Mexico, Cuba, Jamaica, and Panama; his articles, signed W.B.S., brought him recognition as a writer.

In May 1888, Stevens was a witness for six hours during the Lancaster v. Glover libel trial in Washington concerning events he took part in when on assignment there. In 1891, he was called as a witness to a House of Representatives hearing concerning an investigation of speculation during proposed silver legislation.

Stevens became one of the editors and proprietors of The Southport (North Carolina) Leader in 1894 and continued working for the Globe.

=== Publications ===
Stevens published a number of books with the S. J. Clarke Publishing Company, primarily concerning the history of the state of Missouri.

In 1915, Stevens published Missouri The Center State: 1821–1915, a series of books that cover the history of the state of Missouri.

In 1921, Stevens published a series in celebration of the one-hundredth anniversary of the statehood of Missouri, titled Centennial History of Missouri (The Center State): One Hundred Years in the Union 1820–1921.

=== Other work ===
Stevens left journalism in 1901 to become secretary and publicity director of the Louisiana Purchase Exposition Company.

== Memberships ==
Stevens was one of the organizers of St. Louis's Veiled Prophet Ball and Parade in 1878. He was elected president of the Washington Gridiron Club in December 1894. He was a member of the St. Louis Burns Club, secretary of the St. Louis City Plan Commission from 1912 to 1916 and executive secretary of the Fourth American Peace Conference in St. Louis in 1913. He was president of the State Historical Society of Missouri from 1916 to 1925.

== Other reading ==
- Stevens as a speaker at University of Michigan graduation, 1870. "Michigan: The University," Detroit Free Press, June 30, 1870, image 1
