= James Alderman =

Man executed by the U.S. federal government (1884–1929)

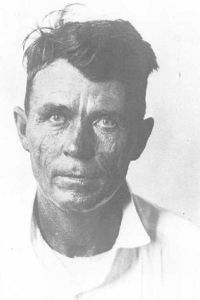
- Born: June 24, 1884; Hillsborough County, Florida, U.S.
- Died: August 17, 1929 (aged 45); Fort Lauderdale, Florida, U.S.
- Other names: King of the Rum Runners, The Gulf Stream Pirate (nicknames in media)
- Occupations: Farmer, fisherman, field guide
- Children: 3
- Status: Executed by hanging
- Conviction: Murder on the high seas (2 counts)
- Penalty: Death by hanging

Details
- Date: August 7, 1927
- Location: Gulf Stream
- Killed: 3
- Injured: 2

James Horace Alderman (in some sources Aldermon) (June 24, 1884 – August 17, 1929) was an American convicted murderer, bootlegger and gangster during the Prohibition era in the United States. He became known in the press by names like the "King of the Rum Runners" and the "Gulf Stream Pirate." While imprisoned awaiting execution he wrote an autobiography titled The Life Story of James Horace Alderman.

== Biography ==
Alderman was born in 1884 near Tampa, Florida. He spent several years in the Ten Thousand Islands area of southwest Florida as a farmer, fisherman, and field guide. With his wife Pearl and three daughters, Bessie, Ruby, and Wilma, Alderman lived variously in Chokoloskee, Caxambas, Palmetto, and Tarracia Island before settling in Fort Myers around 1911. After World War I and the passing of the National Prohibition Act, Alderman began smuggling illegal immigrants and alcohol from Cuba and the Bahamas to Florida. In the 1920s, he set up a base of operations in Miami.

On the afternoon of August 7, 1927, Alderman and his associate Robert Weech were intercepted by a Coast Guard cutter in the waters between Florida and Bimini. After a series of events, Alderman killed U.S. Coast Guardsman Sidney C. Sanderlin and Secret Service agent Robert K. Webster. The cutter's machinist, Victor A. Lamby, was seriously wounded and later died.

Alderman was tried under Sections 272, 273, 275 of the US Criminal Code. In January, 1928, he was sentenced to death by U.S. District Judge Henry D. Clayton. President Herbert Hoover declined clemency. Alderman was hanged on August 17, 1929, on newly erected gallows built by Chief Carpenter's Mate Olaf Tobiason in a metal hangar at Coast Guard Base Six near Fort Lauderdale, the site of Bahia Mar Marina today. Media witnesses were barred from watching the execution. It was the only hanging ever carried out by the Coast Guard, the first hanging in Fort Lauderdale, and the only legal execution in Broward County. It is also the only known occasion where a man was hanged in a hangar.

Alderman's execution had initially been scheduled to be carried out in the Broward County jail, but the County Commissioners declined, insisting that a federal hanging should occur on U.S. property (from 1924 all executions by the state of Florida were carried out by electric chair).

== See also ==
- Capital punishment by the United States federal government
- List of people executed by the United States federal government
