= Myles O'Donnell =

Myles O'Donnell was an Irish-American bootlegger and mobster active in Chicago during the Roaring Twenties and Prohibition era. He was best known as the founder of the West Side O'Donnell gang, also referred to as the West Side O'Donnells, which had no connection to the South Side O'Donnells, a separate and rival criminal organization.

== Early years ==
Myles O’Donnell was born into a large Irish Catholic family in Cicero, Illinois, a western suburb of Chicago. Growing up in modest circumstances, he began his criminal career with petty crime at an early age.

Myles's brother William, known as "Klondike" O'Donnell, was a few years younger than he. Together with their youngest brother, Bernard, the three entered the bootlegging business during Prohibition.

== Alliance with Torrio ==
The O’Donnell brothers formed an alliance with Johnny Torrio, the leader of the Chicago Outfit. As Torrio engaged in conflict with Dean O'Banion and the North Side Gang, the South Side O’Donnells became embroiled in a dispute with Frank McErlane. Meanwhile, the West Site O’Donnells benefited from the distraction of their rivals.

== Getting away with murder ==
In the early hours of a Sunday morning, Myles O'Donnell, heavily intoxicated and staggering, entered a saloon with Jim Doherty, a childhood friend and fellow West Side O'Donnell member. The saloon was owned by Eddie Tancl, a man both O'Donnell and Al Capone resented for his habit of purchasing beer from outside established gang supply lines. Seated across from O'Donnell and Doherty were Tancl and his wife, and across from the couple sat Mayme McClain, Tancl's star entertainer, and Leo Klimas, his head bartender.

After ordering breakfast, O'Donnell and Doherty disputed their bill with the waiter, claiming they had been overcharged. Tancl intervened, positioning himself between O'Donnell and the waiter, just as O'Donnel was about to strike the waiter. O'Donnell shoved Tancl, and both men drew their weapons and shot each other in the chest. Doherty then rose from the table and opened fire. Klimas and the waiter attempted to disarm Doherty, but O'Donnell shot Klimas, forcing him back against the bar, where he died. During the exchange, Tancl was struck multiple times in the chest, Doherty was hit several times in the leg, and O'Donnell was struck four times in the chest.

With their ammunition exhausted, O'Donnell and Doherty made their way to the street, splitting up and going in different directions. Tancl retrieved a second firearm from behind the bar and pursued O'Donnell through the surrounding streets, shooting at him until his weapon was empty. O'Donnell, bleeding heavily, ran through a crowd of Sunday churchgoers before Tancl, out of breath, threw his empty gin at the back of O'Donnell's head. O'Donnell fell and lost consciousness from exhaustion. Tancl also fell but remained conscious. The two men lay just a few feet apart in the middle of the street.

The waiter, whom O'Donnell had earlier tried to strike, approached the scene. Tancl, still conscious, called out to him: "He got me, get him." Those were his last words. The waiter jumped on O'Donnell's body several times, kicked him in the face, and fled the crime scene. Doherty managed to limp to a nearby hospital to treat his leg wounds. O'Donnell, still unconscious in the street, was later found and taken into police custody.

In another version, Myles fled the saloon first, and Klimas was never struck, having taken cover during the gunfight. According to these sources, Tancl shot Doherty, who fell and did not return fire. Myles ran into the street with Tancl in pursuit. Klimas followed to aid his employer. As Tancl collapsed, he called out: "Leo, kill the rat, he got me." Then, Klimas attacked O'Donnell in the same manner described in the earlier account. Doherty, stumbling into the street, witnessed Klimas beating O'Donnell, then shot him in the head at point-blank range. Doherty then carried O'Donnell to his car and the two drove away.

O'Donnell and Doherty, still recovering from their wounds, were both arrested and were brought to trial. The prosecutor failed to convict the men, so both of them were released. They left the courtroom accompanied by family, friends and a group of women.

Despite the presence of numerous witnesses, O'Donnell and Doherty were never convicted for the murders of Klimas and Tancl. It was rumored that the prosecuting attorney, William McSwiggin, was a childhood friend of the defendants and had deliberately undermined the case. The allegation was notable, given McSwiggin's reputation as one of Illinois' most aggressive prosecutors. He earned the nickname "Hanging Prosecutor" for relentlessly pursuing serious criminals and strongly supporting capital punishment.

== McSwiggin ==
William McSwiggin was born and raised in Cicero, Illinois. Known informally as Bill or Will, he befriended the O'Donnell brothers and Doherty during his youth. He was noted for his strong, athletic physique. His father served as a police officer for many years. Despite his close associations with figures from the criminal underworld, McSwiggin pursued a career in law, serving as an Illinois state prosecutor.

On April 27, 1926, McSwiggin was socializing in Cicero with James J. Doherty and Thomas "Red" Duffy when an armed assailant opened fire with a machine gun on the group outside the Pony Inn saloon, located at 5613 West 12th Street, now known as Roosevelt Road. All three were killed.

== Death ==
In early 1933, Myles O'Donnell was shot by a bartender during an altercation. He sustained a gunshot wound to the lung and subsequently contracted pneumonia. He died on March 10, 1933.

Following his brother's death, William "Klondike" O'Donnell assumed control of the West Side rackets but was unable to replicate their former profitability. With Prohibition repealed and the bootlegging operation dissolved, Klondike attempted to sustain his income through a fleet of trucks, which he supplied to Chicago gangster Jack "Three Fingered" White. White operated a labor union racket known as TNT, which coerced members into making payments and dues. The operation eventually attracted federal attention and was shut down, leaving Klondike without a source of income.

=== O'Donnell mob members ===
- Myles O'Donnell - Leader and founder of the West Side O'Donnell gang.
- William "Klondike" O'Donnell - underboss and Myles's brother.
- Bernard O'Donnell - Brewery owner and younger brother of Myles and Klondlike.
- Jim Doherty - Soldier, enforcer, best friend and right-hand man to Myles.
- Thomas "Red" Duffy - Soldier.
- James "Fur" Sammons - Hitman associated with Klondike O'Donnell, was considered by some to be a crazed rapist.
- William McCue - Beer deliverer for the gang; found murdered in a ditch. Doherty was alleged to have ordered his death after McCue was suspected of embezzling proceeds collected from Doherty's saloons.
- Walter Quinlan - Gunman; killed in a saloon by John Ryan.
- Teddy "The Greek" Trakas - Gold jeweler.

== Sources ==
- Paddy Whacked by T.J. English Page 161 year 2005
- Mr. Capone by Robert J. Scheonberg
- The St Valentine's Day Massacre (BY: William J Helmer & Arthur J. Bilek)
