= Joseph Saltis =

Gangster

Joseph Francis Saltis (8 September 1894 – 2 August 1947), known as "Polack Joe", was a Rusyn American Prohibition era organized crime boss who, with Frank McErlane, operated an illegal bootlegging crime family in the Back of the Yards neighborhood of Chicago, until his territory was seized by Al Capone and the Chicago Outfit. Saltis then retired to Wisconsin.

== Early life ==
Saltis was born in Budapest, Austro-Hungarian Empire to Rusyns Jakob Saltis (from Spiš) and Maria Polaczek (from Šariš, Prešov) and immigrated to the United States in 1905, becoming a saloon owner in Joliet, Illinois.

== Chicago ==
He moved to Chicago with the announcement of the Volstead Act in 1920. With the assistance of John "Dingbat" Oberta (sometimes spelled "O'Berta"), a candidate for the Illinois State Senate, Saltis began supplying illegal alcohol to Chicago's speakeasies in the Back of the Yards neighborhood.

During this time, Saltis remained on good terms with Chicago crime boss and his South Side neighbor Al Capone, whose Chicago Outfit began dominating Chicago's bootlegging soon after his arrival in the early 1920s. Indeed, by the mid-1920s, only the Saltis-McErlane organization remained independent from the eight satellite gangs under Capone's control. However, soon becoming entrenched in territory disputes with many of Capone's satellite gangs, Saltis began talks for a secret alliance with Capone rival Earl "Hymie" Weiss's North Side Gang. Throughout the following year, Saltis began preparing for war as smaller rivals such as the Southside O'Donnell's (for which an attempt would be made on his life in late-1925) and sometimes allied Sheldon Gang began to threaten Saltis's hold on the Back of the Yards neighborhood. Soon gunmen such as Frank "Lefty" Koncil, Charlie "Big Hayes" Hubacek, and Frank McErlane joined Saltis's ranks.

On August 6, 1926, Sheldon Gang member John "Mitters" Foley was killed by Frank Koncil while in Saltis's territory. While Koncil, along with Oberta and Saltis, were arrested and charged with murder, Oberta's considerable political influence (as well as assistance from Weiss) was able to get the case dropped on November 9.

The following year, Oberta, with Saltis and many other of Capone's subordinates, managed to arrange a conference at the Hotel Sherman on October 20, which included Al Capone, George "Bugs" Moran, Vincent "The Schemer" Drucci, Jake "Greasy Thumb" Guzik, Jack Zuta, Ralph Sheldon, William Skidmore, Maxie Eisen, and Christian Betsche, managing to agree on a general ceasefire of the various gang wars, specifically between the Chicago Outfit and the North Side Gang, as well as the gang war between Saltis-McErlane and the Sheldon Gang. The ceasefire lasted a little over two months before war broke out again when members of Saltis-McErlane gang killed Sheldon Gang member Hillary Clements on December 30. As the gang war continued between Saltis and the Sheldon Gang over the Back of the Yards neighborhood, Al Capone had begun to move in on Saltis's territory, as the war was beginning to turn in favor of the Sheldon Gang.

When Koncil and Hubacek were lured into an ambush and killed on March 11, 1927, Saltis pleaded to Capone to negotiate peace between the Sheldon Gang in exchange for a large cut of Saltis's profits. By the end of the gang war, however, Saltis's gang began to disintegrate as Frank McErlane left Saltis in late 1929 over disagreements over McErlane's share. When Oberta and his chauffeur, Sam Malaga, disappeared on March 25, 1930, allegedly taken for a "one way ride", Oberta and Malaga were later found dead with gunshot wounds to their heads.

Saltis was suspected by the Chicago Police Department to be involved in 20 gangland murders between 1925 and 1929.

== Retirement ==
With his associates gone and his organization all but destroyed, Saltis quickly retired to his home on Barker Lake in Winter, Wisconsin.

Despite his retirement, when Frank J. Loesch, chairman of the Chicago Crime Commission compiled his "Public Enemies" list of the top 28 people he saw as corrupting Chicago in April 1930, Saltis was listed. (Capone headed the list.) The list was widely published, gaining Saltis a measure of nationwide notoriety.

== Death ==
Saltis later died at age 53 from complications of a stomach ulcer in Chicago's Cook County Hospital in 1947.
