= Sangerman's Bombers =

Sangerman's Bombers were a criminal group of bombers based in Chicago during the 1920s.

The successors of Sweeney's Bombers, the gang was formed by Joseph Sangerman in the early-1920s, shortly after the arrests of the Sweeney gang in 1921. Hired out primarily by Chicago politicians and organized crime groups (such as Al Capone's Chicago Outfit), the group was the first to use its services for labor unions. As an officer of the Chicago barbers union, as well as a leading manufacturer of barber supplies, Sangerman began using the gang to bomb barber shops which refused to agree to union regulations. With the gang's early success, Sangerman began accepting jobs from outside trade unions. By the time of Sangerman's arrest in 1925, the gang, by Sangerman's own admission, included a well-organized group of six members which was hired from $50 to $700. George Matrisciano, a leading member of the gang, was considered one of the best bomb makers in Chicago history. After receiving several indictments against him as a result of Sangerman's arrest, Matrisciano was killed before his testimony. A later investigation by the Illinois Crime Survey suspected several members of the barbers union; however, no charges were filed. Another famous member of the Bombers was Cornelius "Con" Shea.

The gang dissolved shortly afterward the indictment of Sangerman (who died while still awaiting trial, on February 12, 1926, following emergency intestinal surgery), and Matrisciano's death. The use of bombings as a means of intimidation had become less favorable from the negative press coverage, specifically during the Aldermen's Wars of 1916-1921 and the 1928 Republican convention known as the "Pineapple Primary", drew too much attention and public outcry and by the end of the decade the Chicago underworld had returned to more discreet methods of intimidation.
