= Giuseppe Viserte =

Giuseppe "Diamond Joe Peppe" or just "Diamond Joe" Viserti (Italian pronunciation: [dʒuˈzɛppe viˈzɛrti]; 1890 - October 13, 1921.) was a Naples-born New York City mafia-member from the Mustache Pete-era of New Yorks's underworld history. He was mostly known for his activities in Manhattan.

== Early life and career ==
It is unknown when Viserti emigrated from Naples to America but once in New York he quickly established himself in the Italian underworld. Earliest records indicate that by 1913 Viserti was a gunman and soldier associated with a traditional Italian mafia organization, the Morello family of East Harlem and their occasional ally Giosue Gallucci, for whom the police said that he killed Amadio Buonomo in April that year. Later that same year he was arrested and convicted for the death of Jerry "the Lunchman" Maida, a police informant, and was sent away for a sentence of "not less than seven years and nine months in Sing Sing" Prison.

== Mustache Pete mafia boss and bootlegger ==
After serving only four years of his sentence, New York's Governor Whitman pardoned him in 1918. He was heavily into white slavery before the advent of Prohibition and grew rich and influential in the Italian Underworld on it and other criminal enterprises. He was soon a force to be reckoned with, becoming "by all accounts...most likely one of Lower Manhattan's Mafia bosses" where he was married with children. He was arrested again on November 29, 1919 on another murder charge but was not convicted

When Prohibition began, he left white slavery behind and became an effective bootlegger. Along with his ally, Vincenzo Terranova, one of the heads of the Corleonesi mafia borgata known as the Morello Family, he was reputed to run all illicit liquor trade in Harlem during Prohibition's first years. He had become very rich, reportedly, by the time of his death, being worth $300,000 from his illicit booze selling operations. He was also reputed to own a "carpet-joint" gambling house known as the Fordham Casino in addition to some tenement buildings, both in the Bronx As he became rich from his criminal enterprises, he began to famously flaunt his wealth. He became a very flashy dresser and was often "covered in jewels". By 1921, he had become known as "Diamond Joe Peppe" or "Diamond Joe" for short, boasting shortly before his death of owning a $10,000 diamond stick pin. Author Patrick Downey has suggested that he may initially have been the boss to which the rising mafia gangster, Joe Masseria, reported as his captain, until Viserti's death

== Death ==
When the original head of the Morello Family, Giuseppe Morello, emerged back on the scene in 1920, after a decade behind bars, he immediately took back the reigns of leadership from his younger half-brother, Vincenzo Terranova. Morello quickly formed an alliance with one of his former Capo's, the now emerging new Mafia boss of Lower Manhattan's Little Italy, Joe Masseria. The Boss of Bosses at that time, Salvatore D'Aquila wasted no time in fighting back against this threat to his authority and went to war with the Morello-Masseria pact. The first casualty of this new conflict was Diamond Joe Viserti. He was shot twice in the back in a gunfight on October 13, 1921 at a coffee shop in Little Italy.
