= James Cosmano =

James Cosmano also known as "Sunny Jim" (July 17, 1885 – May 2, 1963) was a leader of the Black Hand street gang in pre-Prohibition Chicago who tried to extort money from the South Side gang.

== Early years ==
Born Vincenzo Cosmano in Molochio, Reggio Calabria, Italy, July 17, 1885. He arrived in the United States at Ellis Island on May 14, 1904 aboard the San Gottardo. After a stay in Canada, he crossed over into the US at St. Albans, VT, on December 22, 1904. Cosmano joined the Black Hand as a young man. Cosmano and other Black Handers, including James "The Mad Bomber" Belcastro, preyed on the residents of Chicago's Little Italy and other city neighborhoods at the turn of the 20th century.

== Extortion and Doublecross ==
In 1910, Cosmano tried to extort money out of James "Big Jim" Colosimo, a powerful brothel owner in the Levee section of Chicago. Cosmano threatened to beat up Colosimo's prostitutes and their customers if he did not receive $50,000 a week. To protect himself, Colosimo brought in his nephew Johnny "The Fox" Torrio, a New York mobster from the Five Points Gang. After Torrio's arrival in Chicago, ten members of the Black Hand gang had been murdered. However, Cosmano continued to threaten Colosimo.

In early 1912, Cosmano sent Colosimo a letter threatening to torch his cafe, the Colosimo, unless Colosimo paid him $10,000. Colosimo reportedly asked Torrio to take care of the problem. On January 18, Cosmano was ambushed and severely wounded.

== Survival ==
Cosmano survived the attack and was taken to the hospital. Later, several of his associates smuggled Cosmano out of the hospital to protect him. Cosmano then left Chicago to continue his activities elsewhere.

An associate of labor racketeer Timothy "Big Tim" Murphy, Cosmano was tried with Murphy, Michael "Dago Mike" Carozzo and James Vinci, in the 1920 gangland slaying of Maurice "Mossy" Enright. However, Cosmano, Murphy, and Carozza were eventually released due to lack of evidence.

Cosmano, Murphy, and others attempted to steal $380,000 in cash and bonds from the US Mail in 1921. One of the postal inspectors in on the plot confessed and part of the loot was found in Murphy's attic. Though defended by Clarence Darrow, both Murphy and Cosmano were convicted of conspiracy to rob the US Mail. Cosmano was sentenced on November 14, 1921, and was incarcerated in Leavenworth beginning in February, 1923. Upon release in 1926, and after failed attempts to fight deportation, he returned to Italy in 1927.
