= Benjamin Levinsky =

New York gang leader and labor racketeer (1893–1922)

- Born: 1893
- Died: December 5, 1922 (aged 29); Manhattan, New York, United States
- Cause of death: Murdered
- Other names: Benjamin Levine; Ben Brown
- Known for: New York gang leader and labor racketeer

Benjamin Levinsky (1893 – December 5, 1922) was an American gang leader, labor racketeer and organized crime figure. Spending almost twenty years in and out of reformatories and prisons, Levinsky had a lengthy criminal record prior to the start of Prohibition. He was first arrested in 1902 for incorrigibility and sent to a reformatory asylum. He was caught pickpocketing five years later and was imprisoned on a variety of charges over the next decade including petty theft, grand larceny, felonious assault and vagrancy. He became involved in labor racketeering in Manhattan's Lower East Side and, prior to the third "Labor Slugger War", Levinsky reportedly became "a thorn in the side of clothing contractors". Due to his unionizing activities, he apparently became the target of assassination by certain business interests. Other sources claim he headed a gang of gunmen and thieves which began muscling in on the territory of other "labor sluggers", particularly that of newsboy and labor racketeer William Lipshitz.

On the morning of December 5, 1922, Levinsky was shot and killed by Lipshitz while entering a Broadway loft building where he was employed as a cutter for the Levinson Brothers. He had driven to work in a taxi with Benjamin Massauer, an ex-convict who had spent the night at his home, and who had told the driver to stop the cab when two shots were heard shortly after Levinsky entered the building. As a crowd gathered in front of the building, Lipshitz ran out from the doorway and into a patrolman who had arrived at the scene. When questioned, he denied any knowledge of the shooting and claimed to have been buying a suit when the murder took place.

Both Lipshitz and Massauer were taken to the Mercer Street police station where they were further questioned by police. Lipshitz maintained he had no involvement in Levinsky's murder but was caught lying when he claimed to have no criminal record. He had been using the alias William Levine but admitted to being William Lipshitz when confronted with his photo in the precinct's Rogue's Gallery. A witness also claimed to have seen he and Levinsky fighting in the doorway when the shooting occurred. Lipshitz was eventually charged with Levinsky's death while Massauer was held as a material witness until paroled in the custody of lawyer Hyman Bushel who had been hired by Levinsky's family. Although police suspected his murder had been committed by a personal enemy, Bushel later issued a statement from the family claiming that Levinsky had been murdered as the result of a murder contract by businessmen.
