= Ragen's Colts =

- Founder: Frank Ragen
- Founding location: Canaryville, Chicago, Illinois, United States
- Years active: 1900s – 1932
- Territory: South Side of Chicago
- Ethnicity: Irish American
- Membership: 2,000 (1908)
- Activities: Bribery, election fraud, ethnic violence, rum-running, murder, police corruption, political corruption
- Allies: Chicago Outfit, Sheldon Gang, National Crime Syndicate
- Rivals: African-American gangs

Ragen's Colts was a chiefly Irish street gang which dominated the Chicago underworld during the early twentieth century. By the late 1920s and early 1930s, the gang became part of the Chicago Outfit under Al Capone.

Originally established as an athletic club, the Ragen's Athletic and Benevolent Association was soon led by team pitcher Frank Ragen. He hired out members of the club to Chicago Democrat politicians to do various forms of election fraud.

The gang quickly expanded, numbering 160 members by 1902 and 2,000 by 1908. It earned the motto "Hit Me and You Hit 2,000". By the end of the decade, the gang had financed the careers of hundreds of Chicago city officials, including prominent aldermen, police chiefs, and city treasurers, as well as Ragen himself. Ragen became Chicago police commissioner. By 1920, many members of the gang had become notorious criminals and gunmen, such as William "Gunner" McPadden, Harry Madigan, Joseph "Dynamite" Brooks, Danny McFall, Hughey "Stubby" McGovern, Davy "Yiddles" Miller and Ralph Sheldon of the Sheldon Gang.

The years after World War I were a time of increased social tension, as returning veterans competed with more recent immigrants and newer African American migrants from the South for jobs and housing. In several cities, such tensions erupted in rioting, often instigated by one of slightly older, more established groups to restore dominance over a newer group, often a minority. The Irish and African Americans were both concentrated in housing on the South Side and in jobs at the stockyards located on that side of the city.

The Ragen gang were believed to instigate fights between black and other South Side neighborhoods that contributed to the Chicago race riot of 1919. In one instance, the Colts donned blackface and set fire to Lithuanian and Polish homes in the Back of the Yards neighborhood in a deliberate attempt to incite the immigrant community to join them in committing heinous acts against African Americans. The Ragen gang led raids from Irish neighborhoods into the Black Belt, where they looted homes and killed several people. Blacks retaliated by attacking other South Side neighborhoods. As news of the attacks spread, other neighborhoods around the city began rioting. Violence lasted four days and resulted in 38 deaths: 23 black and 15 white, and more than 1,000 injured.

The Ragen Colts also directed their anger at the Ku Klux Klan for its anti-Catholicism. In 1921, "In September, 3,000 people from the stockyards district (of Chicago) watched as the Colts hanged in effigy 'a white-sheeted Klansman'." (Tuttle)

During Prohibition, the gang soon began bootlegging. Member Ralph Sheldon formed his own group and began hijacking rival liquor shipments. While the gang came into conflict with the Chicago Outfit during the bootleg wars, Capone, impressed with the gang, hired them as enforcers for the organization. The Irish Ragen gang were eventually absorbed into the organization following the establishment of the National Crime Syndicate in 1932. Many members would later become top leaders of the Chicago crime syndicate.

In 1920 several members of Ragen's Colts split off to form the NFL football team the Chicago Maroons, later known as the Chicago Cardinals.

== See also ==
- Valley Gang
