= Valley Gang =

Street gang in Chicago, United States

The Valley Gang was an Irish-American street gang in Chicago, Illinois during the early 20th century, which ultimately made the transition to organized crime and became a de facto extension of the Chicago Outfit under Al Capone.

Formed in the 1890s, the Valley Gang was based in Chicago's Bloody Maxwell section on 15th Street, specializing in pickpocketing and armed robbery. By 1900 the gang had become a leading force in the Chicago underworld, later rivaling Ragen's Colts, hired out for illegal activities ranging from labor slugging to murder for hire. During the mid-1910s, the local Irish mob was led by Paddy "The Bear" Ryan, who, operating from his Irish pub on South Halstead Street, would control most of Bloody Maxwell by Prohibition, until his murder by rival Walter "Runt" Quinlan, in 1920.

After Walter Quinlan's death by Ryan's son Paddy "The Fox" Ryan, Jr., the gang was led by Frankie Lake and Terry Druggan who soon began bootlegging operations as the "Druggan-Lake Gang". Soon becoming successful distributors the gang, with partner Joseph Stenson, owned several breweries by the early 1920s using its wealth to gain political influence and police protection. In 1924, Lake and Druggan were each sentenced to one year in Cook County Jail. However, while serving their sentences, they were allowed to leave the prison regularly due to support from political bosses such as 20th Ward alderman Morris Eller and bribes of $20,000 to Sheriff Peter Hoffman and prison Warden Wesley Westbrook. After a report by the Chicago American, Hoffman was fined $2,500 and sentenced to one-month imprisonment and Westbrook was sentenced to four-months imprisonment.

The gang was soon noticed by Al Capone, due in part to the scandal, and upon their release in 1925 following the bootleg wars an alliance was formed between the gang and the Chicago Outfit, agreeing to give Capone 40% of their earnings in exchange for protection from Ragen's Colts gangsters Danny Stanton, William "Gunner" McPadden, Hughey "Stubby" McGovern, Raymond Cassidy, and Frank "Dutch" Carpenter (although many of these men would be killed during the bootleg wars). With the conviction of Druggan and Lake for tax evasion in 1932 the gang would eventually become absorbed into Outfit by the end of Prohibition. Serving as the Chicago crime syndicate's leading enforcers many of the gang members, including Terry Druggan, retired extremely wealthy.

== Terry Druggan ==
Terry "Machine Gun" Druggan (1903 – March 4, 1954) was an Irish-American mobster and leader of the Valley Gang from 1919 and through the prohibition era.

Druggan was very small in stature, with an explosive temper and a lisp, and was well known throughout the Chicago area as a tough street fighter. He was also ambitious, and worked to extend his criminal reach beyond the Valley territory. By 1924, Druggan's gang was successful enough that even the most junior members wore silk shirts and travelled in Rolls-Royce cars with chauffeurs.

Druggan entered into several lucrative business agreements with Johnny Torrio, and pulled the Valley Gang off the streets and remodelled them after Johnny Torrio's restructured version of Jim Colosimo's outfit.

With the fortune he made during prohibition, Druggan bought a lavish residence on Lake Zurich and a winter estate in Florida, and owned 12 new cars. He had a swimming pool and tennis court, though he could not swim or play tennis, and kept dairy cattle, sheep, and pigs in his pastures. He owned a thoroughbred racing stable and raced his horses at Chicago's tracks, the horses wearing his family's ancient Celtic color scheme.

On one occasion, when he was disqualified at one track for fixing the race, Druggan pulled a gun on the officials and threatened to kill them all if they didn't change their ruling. They changed their ruling.

With the end of Prohibition, the Druggan and Lake gang, as the Valley Gang was then called, was completely saturated into the Chicago syndicate's operations, and ceased to exist independently.
