= Louis Alterie =

American mobster (1886–1935)

- Born: Leland A. Varain; August 2, 1886; California, United States
- Died: July 18, 1935 (aged 48); Chicago, Illinois, United States
- Occupations: Hitman, rancher
- Criminal charges: Murder
- Penalty: Plea bargain; no conviction

Louis "Two Gun" Alterie (August 2, 1886 – July 18, 1935), born Leland A. Varain and also known as "Diamond Jack Alterie", was a Californian who became a notorious hitman for the Chicago North Side Gang during the early years of Prohibition.

== Early years ==
Alterie was born Leland A. Varain in Northern California on August 2, 1886. He moved to Chicago as a young man, and eventually joined the predominantly Irish North Side Gang, which was headed by Dean O'Banion. Befitting his California background, Alterie was a Western enthusiast who wore a ten-gallon hat and two holstered Colt .45 revolvers and owned a ranch near Sedalia, Colorado. As well as being a top gunman for the North Side Gang, he also formed the Theatrical Janitors' Union and used his position as union president to extort money from theater owners.

== Gang war with Chicago Outfit ==
In the early 1920s, the North Side Gang's greatest rival was the Chicago Outfit, run first by John "The Fox" Torrio and then Al Capone. During this period a series of disputes over bootlegging territories and other matters led the North Siders into conflict with the Outfit and its allies, the Genna brothers of Little Italy. Alterie by some reports killed more than 20 Outfit and Genna gang members during this conflict which had erupted into a full-scale gang war in 1924 when O'Banion was murdered by Outfit gunmen in his floral shop on State Street in Chicago.

== Exile to Colorado ==
Alterie was considered the "flake" of the O'Banion gang. He once feigned insanity prior to a murder trial to give his criminal associates time to kill or intimidate witnesses. His act was so convincing that many considered him actually insane.

Incensed by O'Banion's murder, Alterie publicly challenged his killers to a shootout on State Street. However, cooler heads within the North Side Gang were upset by Alterie's bravado; they worried that this would result in unwanted attention from both rival gangs and Chicago officials. Moran convinced Alterie to leave Chicago until it was safe to return.

Alterie chose to go to his Moonridge ranch in Colorado. However, he soon attracted unwanted attention from the Colorado authorities. In November 1932, Alterie was involved in a gangland shooting in Glenwood Springs, Colorado. In February 1933, as part of a sentencing agreement, Alterie agreed to leave Colorado and not come back for a period of five years. At this point, Alterie returned to Chicago. Over the next few years, he briefly returned to Colorado several times, but kept his residence in Chicago.

== Return to Chicago and death ==
During Alterie's absence from Chicago, the gang war between the North Side Gang and the Chicago Outfit continued. In 1929, the Outfit had killed seven North Side gang members in the infamous St. Valentine's Day Massacre. The Chicago Outfit was now in charge.

Other than a vagrancy arrest in Chicago in 1933, Alterie kept a low profile. However, that changed in June 1935 when he was forced to testify against Ralph "Bottles" Capone, Al Capone's brother, on a tax evasion charge. Louis Alterie was killed on July 18, 1935, while leaving his North Side Chicago apartment. Ironically, Alterie was shot by snipers lying in wait for him across from his apartment, using a technique Alterie had pioneered during Prohibition.

The lead story in that afternoon's Chicago Daily News, written by Robert J. Casey, began: "'Two-Gun Louie'" Alterie came out of the shadows of the alky racket long enough to die. He was shot down—in the technique he himself had done so much to perfect." A sidebar by Clem Lane, a legendary city editor, began: "This is the story of 'Two-Gun Louie' Alterie, one-time pugilist, one-time policeman, one-time robber, one-time lieutenant of Johnny Torrio and Dion O'Banion, erstwhile rancher and union business agent, and today the subject of a coroner's inquest as to who shot him and why not sooner."

He was buried in an unmarked grave in Forest Lawn Memorial Park Cemetery in Glendale, California.

== See also ==
- List of homicides in Illinois § Organized crime
