= Milaflores massacre =

1927 mob killing in Detroit

Coordinates: 42°21′03.8″N 83°03′29.8″W

The Milaflores Massacre is the name given to the shooting of three gangsters in retaliation for two murders and a kidnapping in the winter of 1927 in Detroit, Michigan. The crime was suspected to have been perpetrated by the Purple Gang.

== Events ==
By the mid-1920s, the Purples had formed a working alliance with former members of the Egan's Rats gang, specifically Fred "Killer" Burke and Gus Winkler. These two, and a group of gangsters associated with them, were responsible for distributing Purple Gang booze and handling any strong-arm work that was needed.

The trouble began on Christmas night, 1926, when saloon keeper Johnny Reid was shotgunned to death in the rear of his apartment building at 3025 East Grand Boulevard. Reid was an ex-Rat and liquor agent for the Purples. Earlier in the year, he and his St. Louis friends had gotten into a shooting war with Sicilian gangster Mike Dipisa. The ex-Rats defeated their opponent, but he was assumed to have arranged Reid's murder in revenge.

Johnny Reid's killer was assumed to have been Frank Wright, a Chicago-based jewel thief and all-around hood who had recently relocated to Detroit. Wright, along with two New York burglars, Joseph Bloom and George Cohen, began kidnapping local gamblers for ransom. Many of the people they snatched were connected with the Purple Gang.

Wright, Bloom, and Cohen apparently crossed the line when they gunned down Purple drug peddler Jake Weinberg in the North End on February 3, 1927. The Bernstein brothers—leaders of the Purple Gang—hired Fred Burke and Gus Winkler to avenge Weinberg.

Wright was lured into the open with the kidnapping of his friend Meyer "Fish" Bloomfield. Winkler telephoned Wright and told him he could re-acquire his friend in Apartment 308 of the Milaflores Apartments, located at 106 East Alexanderine Avenue. At 4:30 on the morning of March 28, 1927, Wright, Bloom, and Cohen arrived at the Milaflores and knocked on the door of 308. As they did, the fire door at the end of the hallway opened, and three men began shooting with a concentrated volley of pistol and submachine gun fire. All three gangsters fell to the ground. The three triggermen escaped down the back stairway once their weapons were empty.

Bloom and Cohen were DOA (they had been so riddled with bullets the coroner could not tell how many times they had been shot). Wright was still alive despite fourteen bullet wounds. When asked if he saw the killers, he moaned, "The machine gun worked. That's all I can remember." Wright died of his wounds about twenty hours later. The shooting made multiple headlines in the local newspapers. It was the first time the Thompson submachine gun had been used in Detroit gang warfare. While searching Apt. 308, police found items implicating Purple gangsters Eddie Fletcher, Abe and Simon Axler, Joe "Honey Boy" Miller, and John Tolzdorf.

The day after the massacre, three Detroit police officers pulled over a car on Woodward Avenue and arrested Abe Axler and Fred Burke. While both men were suspected in the slaughter, neither was charged, nor was anyone else.

The incident solidified the reputation of the Purple Gang in Detroit. It was believed at the time that Fred Burke had been the machine-gunner, assisted by Purple hitmen Abe Axler and Eddie Fletcher (aka The Siamese Twins).

== See also ==
- List of homicides in Michigan
- List of kidnappings
- List of unsolved murders (1900–1979)
