= One-way ride =

Slang in the underworld for an execution method

A one-way ride, also known by the phrase taking someone for a ride, is slang in the underworld for an execution method. The usual plan is for the victims, who are lured or forced into a car, to be driven to a remote location where they are killed (either en route or after their arrival) where their bodies are dumped.

== History ==
First coming into use during Prohibition, the phrase was reportedly first used by Northside Gang member Hymie Weiss who was last seen driving off with Steve Wisniewski, a local criminal who had recently hijacked a Northside beer shipment, in July 1921.

This method was used in countless gangland executions throughout the period, particularly by the Northsiders and the Chicago Outfit, as the bodies of mobsters and other underworld figures would be found in remote locations outside Chicago throughout the 1920s and 1930s.

== In popular culture ==
- A one-way ride (Chicago Ride) has often been depicted in gangster movies such as The Godfather II (1974), The Long Good Friday (1979), Miller's Crossing (1990) and Bullets Over Broadway (1994). It was also used in the television show The Sopranos.

== See also ==
- Barrel murder
- Cement shoes
