= Walter Stevens (gangster) =

Freelance enforcer

Walter Stevens (1877–1931) was a freelance enforcer and "hitman", popularly known as "dean of the Chicago gunmen", during Prohibition. Although having the reputation of a violent gangster, credited with the deaths of at least 60 men, Stevens was a devoted husband to an invalid wife and his three adopted children. Stevens was uncharacteristically cultured compared to his fellow gangsters, refraining from drinking and reportedly quoting classical literature from authors such as Robert Louis Stevenson and poet Robert Burns.

A long-time Chicago gangster, Stevens first gained prominence as a labor slugger, alternating between labor racketeer Maurice "Mossy" Enright and other rivals, often committing assault and murder-for-hire for as much as $50.00 ($928.50 in 2025). Stevens murdered rival gunman Pete Gentleman in 1919, on orders from Enright.

During the early 1910s, Stevens began to develop political connections and, as seen during the 1919 embezzlement trial of Illinois State Treasurer Len Small, Stevens was able to help win Small's acquittal through bribery and intimidation of the jury. Small, who eventually became governor, pardoned Stevens after his conviction for murdering an Aurora police officer in October 1918.

Following Enright's death in 1920, Stevens was readily hired by the Torrio-Capone organization, then in the midst of the violent bootlegging wars which would come to define Prohibition-era Chicago during the first half of the early 1920s. It was while with Torrio-Capone that Stevens would be involved in the murders of five members of the "South Side O'Donnell's". Retiring in 1924, Stevens would continue to act as an intermediary securing political favors from local and state officials, including Governor Small, for the future Chicago Outfit. Remaining with the crime syndicate during the 1930s, Stevens eventually died from natural causes in 1939 (although other sources claim he died of pneumonia on February 15, 1931, at the age of 62).
