= Maurice Enright =

Maurice "Mossy" or "Mossie" Enright (died February 2, 1920) was an Irish-American gangster and one of the earliest Chicago labor racketeers in the early 20th century.

Little is known of Maurice Enright's background before his gang's violent and brutal methods managed to dominate Chicago's labor unions by the end of the 19th century. A veteran of the "Circulation Wars," he became a major figure in the city's steamfitters' union during the early 1910s and was instrumental in the rise of Johnny Torrio, who provided Enright with invaluable political protection from Chicago's First Ward vice district Aldermen "Bathhouse" John Couglin and Michael "Hinky Dink" Kenna.

Enright remained in control of the city's labor unions into the early months of Prohibition until his death on February 2, 1920, when he was gunned down near his South Side home (most likely by rival Timothy "Big Tim" Murphy or Johnny Torrio and Al Capone. Enright's death occurred shortly before the death of James "Big Jim" Colosimo).

Although Vincent Cosmano was later arrested and eventually acquitted for the murder, only labor union racketeer James Vinci would be convicted of Enright's murder.

== See also ==
- List of homicides in Illinois § Organized crime
