= Vincenzo Genna =

Italian-American mobster (1888–1931)

- Born: Vincenzo Genna; January 18, 1888; Marsala, Sicily, Italy
- Died: November 8, 1931 (aged 43); Calumet City, Illinois, U.S.
- Resting place: Mount Carmel Cemetery
- Occupations: gangster, bootlegger, racketeer, jewel thief, and olive oil importer
- Parent(s): Antonino Genna Sr. Maria Concetta Utica
- Allegiance: Genna crime family, Chicago Outfit, Unione Siciliana.

Vincenzo "James" Genna (Italian pronunciation: [vinˈtʃɛntso ˈdʒɛnna]; January 18, 1888 – November 8, 1931) was an Italian-born mobster in Chicago. He headed the Genna crime family with his brothers. Genna and his brothers waged war against the North Side Gang before half of the brothers were killed and Genna fled.

== Early life ==
Vincenzo Genna was born on in Marsala, Sicily. His parents, Antonio Genna Sr. and Maria had six other sons: Antonio "the Gentleman", Angelo "Bloody Angelo", Mike "the Devil", Salvatore "Sam", Pietro "Peter", and Nicola Genna (who stayed in Sicily); and two sisters: Rosa Laudicina and Caterina Mariana. He and his brothers entered the U.S. through New York around 1910.

== Prohibition and O'Banion ==
The Genna brothers became a close knit Marsala-based Mafia and bootlegging gang. When Prohibition became a federal law in 1919, the Gennas obtained a federal license to legally manufacture industrial alcohol, in which they sold illegally. Tony and his brothers operated from Chicago's Little Italy, which was located west of the Chicago loop.

During prohibition, Genna owned an illegal bar near Taylor and Halstead.

They started selling their extra alcohol at cut-rate prices outside of their territory on the North Side. This caused a problem with the North Side Gang leader Charles Dean O'Banion, who in turn, went to South Side Gang boss Giovanni "Johnny the Fox" Torrio and Unione Siciliana boss Mike Merlo to get the Gennas to back down. Torrio refused, so O'Banion started hijacking alcohol shipments belonging to the Genna brothers.

On November 3, 1924, Dean O'Banion inadvertently signed his own death warrant during an argumentative phone call to arch-rival Angelo Genna. Their disagreement originated at The Ship, the gambling casino that the North Side gang boss owned along with the Torrio Syndicate. On this day, O'Banion sat in with Al Capone, Frank Nitti, Frank Rio, and others to tally the week's profits. It was mentioned that Angelo Genna had dropped a large amount of cash, plus a sizable marker. Capone recommended that they cancel the marker as a professional courtesy. O'Banion, instead, got Genna on the telephone and demanded that he pay his debt within a week. With this personal insult, Angelo Genna and his family could no longer be restrained. Until then, Merlo and the Unione had refused to sanction a hit on O'Banion. However, Merlo had terminal cancer and died on November 8, 1924. With Merlo gone, the Gennas and South Siders were free to move on O'Banion.

Torrio ordered the brothers to kill O'Banion; the brothers carried out the hit on November 10, 1924. Francesco Ioele and two Genna hitmen—Giovanni Scalise and Alberto Anselmi—entered O'Banion's flower shop, Schofield, and when Yale shook O'Banion's hand, Scalise and Anselmi shot two bullets into his chest and two in his neck. And while O'Banion was lying face-down on the floor, one of the men shot a final bullet in the back of his head.

== Gang war ==
After the O'Banion murder, Chicago erupted into a full-scale war. The North Siders—now led by Adelard Cunin—attempted to kill Torrio outside his home, causing him to flee to Italy, leaving his second-in-command—Alphonse "Scarface" Capone—as head of the Outfit.

Then, the North Siders took aim at the Gennas. On May 26, 1925, Moran, Vincent "the Schemer" Drucci, and Earl "Hymie" Weiss wounded Tony's brother Angelo in a high-speed chase, causing him to die shortly after. Then on June 13, 1925, Mike Genna is killed by police after a shootout with North Siders. On July 8, 1925, Tony Genna was ambushed and killed by a Genna turncoat. James and his remaining two brothers fled Chicago.

== Return to Italy ==
After three of his brothers’ deaths, Genna fled to Italy via Paris with Torrio. After arriving in Italy, Genna had spent much of his money he made from the family’s alcohol business at night clubs and from living in Via Monte Grappa. He made a plan to steal the Madonna Di Trapani church jewels in Sicily. In the first week of January 1926, Genna was arrested in Rome, Italy, for the theft of the Madonna Di Trapani church jewels. He was sentenced to a couple of years of hard labor in the jail at Favignana, and was released between 1928 and 1929.

== Return to Chicago ==
Genna then decided to return to Chicago and get back into business as a gangster. On May 31, 1930, Genna was driving in a car with four old Genna gang members, when a large sedan pulled up alongside of them and a volley of shotgun and pistol shots into the car. Philip Gnolfo was killed and two others were wounded. Genna gave up on muscling in on the old Genna territory and fled to Calumet City.

== Death and aftermath ==
On November 8, 1931, Vincenzo Genna died of heart disease. His remaining two Chicago brothers also died of natural causes: Pietro died on May 13, 1948, at Columbus Hospital; and on December 20, 1951, Salvatore Genna died of a heart attack in his home on 865 Blue Island Ave.

== See also ==
- Italians in Chicago
