= Angelo Genna =

American bootlegger (1898–1925)

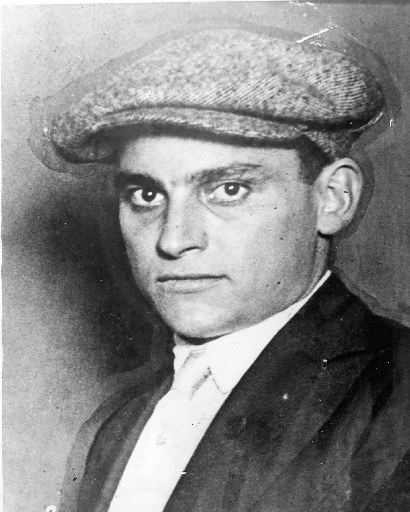
- Born: Angelo Genna; February 3, 1898; Marsala, Sicily, Italy
- Died: May 26, 1925 (aged 27); Chicago, Illinois, U.S.
- Cause of death: Homicide
- Resting place: Mount Carmel Cemetery
- Other name: Bloody Angelo
- Occupations: Crime boss, gangster, bootlegger.
- Spouse: Lucille Spingola (m. 1923; died 1925)
- Parent(s): Antonino Genna Sr. Maria Concetta Utica
- Allegiance: Genna crime family, Chicago Outfit, Unione Siciliana, Anthony D'Andrea.

Angelo "Bloody Angelo" Genna (Italian pronunciation: [ˈandʒelo ˈdʒɛnna]; February 3, 1898 – May 26, 1925) was an Italian-born Chicago bootlegger and organized crime leader during the Prohibition era. A key member of the Sicilian crime family, primarily made up of his brothers, he was best known for his war with the North Side Gang leader, Dean O'Banion.

Genna and his brothers then fought the North Side's new leader, George "Bugs" Moran. But, almost seven months later, in May 1925, Moran chased Angelo in a high-speed car chase and shot him to death. In June and July, two of Angelo's brothers were killed, while the other three brothers fled.

== Early life ==
Angelo Genna was born on February 3, 1898, in Marsala, Sicily. Genna's parents, Antonino Genna Sr. and Maria Concetta Utica, had six other sons: Antonio "the Gentleman", Mike "the Devil", Vincenzo "Jim", Pietro "Peter", Salvatore "Sam", and Nicola Genna (who stayed in Sicily); and two daughters: Rosa Laudicina and Caterina Mariana. He and his brothers entered the U.S. through New York around 1910. Angelo arrived in New York harbor on August 5, 1914, via the S.S. Venezia. He was on his way to meet his brother Pietro, who lived at 870 Blue Island Avenue in Chicago.

== Aldermen's Wars ==
The Aldermen's Wars were at their height at the time of the 19th Ward's 1921 elections. Anthony D'Andrea hired Genna to kill supporters of alderman John Powers. Genna was suspected of killing Harry Raimondi and Paul Labriola, two Powers supporters that won the elections.

Genna was arrested and tried for the murder of Labriola. His defense attorney was a friend of D'Andrea. In 1922, Genna was prosecuted for the murder of Paul Notti, who had identified Genna on his deathbed. Genna was not convicted on either charge. In November 1922, Genna was sentenced to a year in prison after being convicted for the prostitution of a 15-year-old girl.

On December 18, 1922, Genna was arrested by detectives after being named as a stolen goods fence for a gang accused of killing Joe Lanus. He is then released on $15,000 bonds.

== Prohibition and O'Banion ==
The Gennas became a close knit Marsala-based Mafia and bootlegging gang. In 1919, the Gennas obtained a federal license to legally manufacture industrial alcohol, which they sold illegally. Angelo and his brothers operated from Chicago's Little Italy, which was located west of the Chicago Loop.

They started selling their extra alcohol at cut-rate prices outside of their territory. This caused a problem with the North Side Gang leader Dean O'Banion, who went to John "Johnny The Fox" Torrio and Unione Siciliana boss Mike Merlo to get the Gennas to back down. When Torrio refused, O'Banion began hijacking shipments of alcohol belonging to the Genna brothers.

On November 3, 1924, Dean O'Banion inadvertently signed his own death warrant during an argumentative phone call to arch-rival Angelo Genna. Their disagreement originated at The Ship, the gambling casino that the North Side gang boss owned along with the Torrio Syndicate. On this day, O'Banion sat in with Al Capone, Frank Nitti, Frank Rio, and others to tally the week's profits. It was mentioned that Angelo Genna had dropped a large amount of cash, plus a sizable marker. Capone recommended that they cancel the marker as a professional courtesy. O'Banion, instead, got Genna on the telephone and demanded that he pay his debt within a week. With this personal insult, Angelo Genna and his family could no longer be restrained. Until then, Merlo and the Unione had refused to sanction a hit on O'Banion. However, Merlo had terminal cancer and died on November 8, 1924. With Merlo gone, the Gennas and South Siders were free to move on O'Banion.

Hitmen working on orders from Torrio and the Gennas killed O'Banion on November 10, 1924. Francesco Yale and two Genna hitmen—John Scalise and Alberto Anselmi—entered O'Banion's flower shop, Schofield, and when Yale and O'Banion shook hands, Scalise and Anselmi shot two bullets into O'Banion's chest and two in his throat, and one of them shot a final bullet into the back of his skull as he was lying on the floor, face-down.

== Personal life ==
On December 13, 1922, Angelo and Lucille Spingola applied for a marriage license and on January 10, 1923, Angelo and Lucille got married. Spingola was the sister of Genna ally Peter Spingola. The wedding was lavish, with 3,000 guests and a 2,000 pound cake.

== Gang war and death ==
After the O'Banion hit, Chicago erupted into a five-year full-scale war. The North Siders—now led by Hymie Weiss—attempted to assassinate Torrio outside his home, causing Torrio to flee to Italy, leaving his second-in-command—Alphonse "Scarface" Capone—as head of the Chicago Outfit.

The North Siders took aim at the Genna brothers. On May 26, 1925, Moran, Vincent "The Schemer" Drucci, and Hymie Weiss shot and wounded Genna numerous times during a high-speed car chase, causing Genna to crash his car into a lamp post at Hudson and Ogden Avenues. Angelo was rushed to the Evangelical Deaconess Hospital. When police asked Genna who shot him, he merely shrugged. He died shortly afterwards while his brother Sam, wife, and brother-in-law were at his bedside. He was buried on May 29, 1925, at the Mount Carmel Cemetery in Chicago.

== Funeral ==
Several hundred people attended Genna's funeral on May 29, 1925. His funeral was supposed to belittle O'Banion's previous $100,000 funeral. Genna was laid out in a $3,000 bronze coffin that weighed about 1,200 pounds and was surrounded by $75,000 worth of flowers, mostly bought from O'Banion's flower shop Schofield. Capone had sent lilies, Joseph "Diamond Joe" Esposito sent peonies, Torrio sent a huge vase of pink and white carnations. There was also a floral tribute sent from Samuzzo Amatuna.

The funeral home in which his funeral took place—Michael Larussi's Undertaking Establishment—was filled with pallbearers and members of Unione Siciliana. Included in mass of people were 50 policemen, politicians, lawyers, doctors, and labor union officials.

== Aftermath ==
On June 13, 1925, Mike Genna was shot by police after a shootout with North Siders. On July 8, 1925, Antonio Genna was ambushed and shot to death. The remaining three brothers Jim, Sam, and Peter fled Chicago.
