= Tony Genna =

Italian-born American mobster (1890–1925)

- Born: Antonio Genna Jr. July 12, 1890; Marsala, Sicily, Italy
- Died: July 8, 1925 (aged 34); Chicago, Illinois, U.S.
- Cause of death: Homicide
- Resting place: Mount Carmel Cemetery
- Other names: The Gentleman, Tony the Gentleman, Tony
- Occupations: gangster, bootlegger, building contractor, racketeer
- Parent(s): Antonino Genna Sr. Maria Concetta Utica
- Allegiance: Genna crime family, Chicago Outfit, Unione Siciliana

Antonio "the Gentleman" Genna (Italian pronunciation: [anˈtɔːnjo ˈdʒɛnna]; July 12, 1890 – July 8, 1925) was an Italian-born mobster in Chicago. He headed the Genna crime family with his brothers. Genna was ambushed by a Genna family turncoat on orders of North Side Gang leaders Vince Drucci and Bugs Moran.

== Early life ==
Antonio Genna was born on July 12, 1890, to Sicilian parents, Antonio Genna Sr. and Maria Concetta Utica in Marsala, Sicily. He had six brothers: Michele, Vincenzo, Pietro, Salvatore, Angelo, and Nicola Genna; and two sisters: Rosa Laudicina and Caterina Mariana. He and his brothers entered the U.S. through New York around 1910.

== Legitimate business ==
Before becoming a gangster, Genna was a building contractor and architect.

== Prohibition and O'Banion ==
Genna reportedly had some rudimentary skill as a surgeon, and was known to operate on his soldiers if they couldn't go to a hospital for fear of arrest.

They started selling their extra alcohol at cut-rate prices outside of their territory on the North Side. This caused a problem with the North Side Gang leader Charles Dean O'Banion, who in turn, went to South Side Gang boss John "Johnny the Fox" Torrio and Unione Siciliana boss Mike Merlo to get the Gennas to back down. Torrio refused, so O'Banion started hijacking alcohol shipments belonging to the Genna brothers. Torrio ordered the brothers to kill O'Banion; the brothers carried out the hit on November 10, 1924. Francesco Ioele and two Genna hitmen—Giovanni Scalise and Alberto Anselmi—entered O'Banion's flower shop, Schofield, and when Yale shook O'Banion's hand, Scalise and Anselmi shot two bullets into his chest and two in his neck. While O'Banion was lying face-down on the floor, one of the men shot a final bullet in the back of his head.

== Personal life ==
Genna had a girlfriend named Gladys Bagwill, whom the rest of the Gennas did not like due to her not being Italian. She was a minister's daughter. Apparently, Genna had planned to marry her (before he was killed).

== Gang war and death ==
After the O'Banion murder, Chicago erupted into a full-scale war. The North Siders—now led by Earl "Hymie" Weiss—attempted to kill Torrio outside his home, causing him to flee to Italy, leaving his second-in-command—Alphonse "Scarface" Capone—as head of the Outfit.

Then, the North Siders took aim at the Gennas. On May 26, 1925, Weiss, Vincent "the Schemer" Drucci and George "Bugs" Moran wounded Tony's brother Angelo in a high-speed chase, causing him to die shortly after. Then on June 13, 1925, Mike Genna was killed by police after a shootout with North Siders.

On July 8, 1925, Tony Genna was asked to meet by one of his friends—Antonio "Cavalero" Spano (aka Giuseppe Nerone)—at Grand Avenue and Curtis Street. He agreed, not knowing that the meeting was set up by Drucci and Moran. The two men met in front of a grocery store, and when they shook hands, another two men stepped out from behind Spano and shot Genna in the chest and abdomen (Spano set it up to be just like O'Banion's murder). Tony was rushed to the hospital and lived long enough to tell Sam Genna that it was Spano who lured him.

== Funeral ==
Genna's funeral was the exact opposite of his brother Genna's funeral. It was modest and secretive. There were only two floral pieces, one from a relative and one from his remaining brothers. His casket cost $5,000. None of his brothers showed up at the funeral. Due to Tony being a slain gangster, Cardinal Mundelein refused the family Catholic funeral rites.

== Aftermath ==
The remaining three brothers fled Chicago. On August 26, 1926, Spano was killed by one of Giuseppe "Joe" Aiello's brothers for a past transgression against the Aiellos.

After the Gennas fled, the Aiello brothers declared themselves the bosses of the old Genna territory. The Aiellos had an alliance with Castellammarese Clan boss Salvatore Maranzano and a close connection to the North Siders. They attempted to murder Capone to become the most powerful Italian organization in Chicago. In 1930, Joe Aiello was murdered and Capone took over the territory.

== See also ==
- List of homicides in Illinois § Organized crime
- Italians in Chicago
