= Genna (surname) =

Genna (Italian pronunciation: [ˈdʒɛnna]) is an Italian surname. Notable people with the surname include:

- Angelo Genna (1898–1925), Italian mobster of the Genna crime family
- Mike Genna (1895–1925), Italian mobster of the Genna crime family
- Tony Genna (1890–1925), Italian mobster of the Genna crime family
- Vincenzo Genna (1888–1931), Italian mobster of the Genna crime family
- Francesca Genna (born 1967), Italian academic
- Irene Genna (1931–1986), Italian actress
