= Mike Genna =

American mobster (1895–1925)

- Born: Michele Genna; January 18, 1895; Marsala, Sicily, Italy
- Died: June 13, 1925 (aged 30); Chicago, Illinois, U.S.
- Cause of death: Gunshot
- Resting place: Mount Carmel Cemetery
- Other names: Mike, Mike the Devil
- Occupations: Gangster, bootlegger, enforcer, racketeer.
- Parent(s): Antonino Genna Sr. Maria Concetta Utica
- Allegiance: Genna crime family, Chicago Outfit, Unione Siciliana.

Michele "Mike the Devil" Genna (Italian pronunciation: [miˈkɛːle ˈdʒɛnna]; January 18, 1895 – June 13, 1925) was an Italian-born mobster in Chicago during the 1920s. He headed the Genna crime family with his brothers. He was killed by police officers after a shootout with North Siders, being one of the only American organized crime leaders to be killed by a policeman.

== Early life ==
Michele Genna was born on January 18, 1895, in Marsala, Sicily. Genna's parents, Antonino Genna Sr. and Maria Concetta Utica, had six other sons: Antonio "the Gentleman", Angelo "Bloody Angelo", Vincenzo "Jim", Pietro "Peter", Salvatore "Sam", and Nicola Genna (who stayed in Sicily); and two daughters: Rosa Laudicina and Caterina Mariana. He and his brothers entered the U.S. through New York around 1910.

== Prohibition and O'Banion ==
The Gennas became a close knit Marsala-based Mafia and bootlegging gang. In 1919, the Gennas obtained a federal license to legally manufacture industrial alcohol, which they sold illegally. Angelo and his brothers operated from Chicago's Little Italy, which was located west of the Chicago Loop.

They started selling their extra alcohol at cut-rate prices outside of their territory. This caused a problem with the North Side Gang leader Dean O'Banion, who went to South Side Gang leader John "Johnny the Fox" Torrio and Unione Siciliana boss Mike Merlo to get the Gennas to back down. When Torrio refused, O'Banion began hijacking shipments of alcohol belonging to the Genna brothers.

On November 3, 1924, Dean O'Banion inadvertently signed his own death warrant during an argumentative phone call to arch-rival Angelo Genna. Their disagreement originated at The Ship, the gambling casino that the North Side gang boss owned along with the Torrio Syndicate. On this day, O'Banion sat in with Al Capone, Frank Nitti, Frank Rio, and others to tally the week's profits. It was mentioned that Angelo Genna had dropped a large amount of cash, plus a sizable marker. Capone recommended that they cancel the marker as a professional courtesy. O'Banion, instead, got Genna on the telephone and demanded that he pay his debt within a week. With this personal insult, Angelo Genna and his family could no longer be restrained. Until then, Merlo and the Unione had refused to sanction a hit on O'Banion. However, Merlo had terminal cancer and died on November 8, 1924. With Merlo gone, the Gennas and South Siders were free to move on O'Banion.

Torrio ordered the Gennas to murder O'Banion; the brothers carried out the hit on November 10, 1924. Francesco Ioele and two Genna hitmen—Giovanni Scalise and Alberto Anselmi—entered O'Banion's flower shop, Schofield, and when Yale and O'Banion shook hands, Scalise and Anselmi fired two bullets into O'Banion's chest and two into his throat, and one of them fired a final bullet into the back of his skull as he was lying on the floor, face-down.

== Gang war and death ==
After O'Banion's death, the North Siders—now led by Henry Earl "Hymie" Weiss—attempted to kill Torrio outside his home on January 24, 1925, causing Torrio to flee to Naples; leaving his top bouncer—Alphonse "Scarface" Capone—in charge of the Outfit.

On May 26, 1925, Weiss, Vincent "the Schemer" Drucci, and George "Bugs" Moran shot and killed Angelo Genna in a high-speed car chase.

On June 13, 1925, Genna, Scalise, and Anselmi had a shootout with the North Siders. After the shootout, the three men were chased by Chicago Police detectives Michael Conway, rookie William Sweeny, officer Charles Walsh and another officer, Harold Olson. The three opened fire on the policemen killing Walsh and Olson and wounding a third officer. Police shot Genna in the leg, severing an artery; Genna died in an ambulance after he kicked an officer in the face.

== Funeral ==
Genna's family had planned for his funeral to be lavish like his late brother Angelo's funeral, but the funeral was quick and quiet due to the two policemen he killed. Police spread the word that they would arrest any gangster attending. No gangster attended, not wanting to be identified as one at his funeral and connected with the crime.

== Aftermath ==
On July 9, 1925, Genna's brother Antonio was ambushed and killed by a Genna traitor on orders of Moran and Weiss. After Antonio's death, the three remaining Chicago brothers—Sam, Jim, and Peter—fled Chicago; leaving the Genna territory to be taken over by Joe Aiello and his brothers, then by the Outfit.
