= Dan Healy (detective) =

Chicago detective (1895 - 1980)

Daniel F. Healy (c. 1895 – July 8, 1980) was a Chicago detective who became famous when he killed the leader of the North Side Gang, Vincent Drucci, during an altercation which occurred during the course of an arrest, on April 4, 1927. By 1933 Healy had been made sergeant of the Chicago Police. After retiring from the Chicago Police Department, Healy served as Chief of Police for Stone Park, a village in Cook County, Illinois.

== See also ==
- Dean O'Banion
- Hymie Weiss
- Bugs Moran
