= Schofield's Flowers =

Chicago flower shop (1896–1976)

Schofield's Flowers was a Chicago flower shop that was in business from 1896 to 1976. In its heyday it provided flowers to some of Chicago's most prominent and infamous citizens.

== History ==
Schofield's Flowers was established just before the turn of the last century in 1896 by William F. Schofield, A.K.A. "Big Bill". It was located at 738 North State Street, directly across the street from Holy Name Cathedral, on the corner of State Street and Superior Avenue on the north side of the city of Chicago. Owned and operated by William F. Schofield, better known as "Big Bill", a young Irishman who came to America with his wife, Nellie Malloy. Schofield's Flowers flourished in the hardscrabble neighborhood, a family-run business that became infamous.

== Connection with organized crime ==
In 1921, notorious mobster Dean O'Banion used extortion to become a business partner of Schofield's. The Chicago North Side Gang transformed Schofield's into the florist of choice for mob funerals, all of the North State Street Gang's weddings, holidays and special occasions, like providing the wreaths for the victims of the Saint Valentine's Day Massacre. Dean O'Banion was murdered at the flower shop on November 10, 1924, at the age of 32. The triggermen were members of Al Capone's Chicago Outfit: Frankie Yale, John Scalise and Albert Anselmi. After O'Banion's death, Schofield's Flowers lived on, with Bugs Moran taking over the North State Street Gang, along with Hymie Weiss, better known as "Hymie the Pole Weiss."

== Later years and closure ==
After Prohibition, like the whole country, Schofield's Flowers experienced financial hardship during the Great Depression, (1929–39). At one time, "Big Bill" owned a foursquare block of land from Superior to Chicago Avenue and State Street to Dearborn Avenue. "Big Bill" lost everything but his flower shop, later renting from a Jewish family, one of his top clients who helped him through hard times. He made the papers again in the late 1960s when "Big Bill's" son, Stephen Eugene Schofield, was arrested and eventually charged with gambling, "Scof", as he was known to friends, was sentenced to one year at Sandstone Federal Penitentiary by Judge Julius Hoffman. Hoffman refused to honor a plea bargain, instead opting to make an example of the case. He painted the Schofield Family as willing participants in organized crime since the 1920s, pointing to its association with O'Banion and the North State Street Gang as proof.

Schofield Sr.'s wife Gwen took over the flower shop while she continued to raise their two children, Steven (Scof Jr.) and Sandra. After his release six months later, Schofield Sr. rejoined his family business, after which it grew into one of the first FTD member florists. On September 3, 1974, Schofield Sr. died of a massive heart attack. Again Schofield's Flowers supplied one of the biggest funerals for one of their own Irish sons. Local dignitaries Mayor Daley, Eddie Kelley, head of the 47th Ward and the Chicago Park District, and George Dunn, head of the 42nd Ward and Cook County Commissioner joined the other 2,000 mourners. Schofield's Flowers continued in business, at 731 North Dearborn Street, run by surviving family members, wife Gwen and son Steven until it was sold to LaSalle Flowers in 1976.

The original building was torn down on August 13, 1960 and is currently the site of One Chicago
