= Charles Reiser =

American safecracker

Charles "The Ox" Reiser (1878 – October 10, 1921) was an American safecracker and mentor to many of the organized crime leaders of the early 20th century including Dean O'Banion, George "Bugs" Moran, Earl "Hymie" Weiss, and John Mahoney.

== Biography ==
He was born in 1878; very little is known of Reiser's early life. Reiser quickly started a rap sheet. In 1902, Reiser was arrested for safecracking. Released on bail, he reportedly killed the witness to this crime and the case was later dropped. In 1905, Reiser was again arrested and released, the witness disappeared, and the case was dropped.

In 1907, he was convicted of assault with a deadly weapon and sentenced to 30 days in jail. In 1909, Reiser was arrested in Seattle, Washington and charged with burglary and murder. Yet again, the witnesses in the case were killed. The murderous safecracker soon returned to Chicago.

Around 1914, Reiser met O'Banion, the future leader of the Chicago North Side Gang. O'Banion and several friends started accompanying Reiser on some safecracking jobs. During this time, living under the alias Charles Schoeps, Reiser invested most of the stolen money in real estate. He eventually became the owner of a large apartment building in the Chicago area. Around this time, Reiser remarried. His first wife had died of asphyxiation (although Reiser allegedly bragged to friends that he had beaten her to death when she threatened to go to police).

In 1920, one of Reiser's safecracking partners, Clarance White, told Reiser that the cops had questioned him about a job they committed. Reiser and White had stolen a Standard Oil Co. safe and taken its contents. To protect himself, Reiser murdered White and made it look like a suicide. Around April 1921, another Reiser associate, John Mahoney, was arrested while safecracking and started talking to the police. Reiser murdered him.

In 1921, while recovering in a Chicago hospital after an attempted robbery, Reiser's wife came to visit him. A staff member soon discovered her weeping over his dead body in his hospital room. Somewhat indicative of the state of Chicago law and politics at that time, the coroner's jury declared that Reiser – whose body had ten separate bullet wounds in it – had died as a result of suicide.

== See also ==
- List of homicides in Illinois § Organized crime

== Sources ==
- Sifakis, Carl. The Mafia Encyclopedia. New York: Da Capo Press, 2005. ISBN 0-8160-5694-3
- Sifakis, Carl. The Encyclopedia of American Crime. New York: Facts on File Inc., 2001. ISBN 0-8160-4040-0
