= Inn at Lincoln Park =

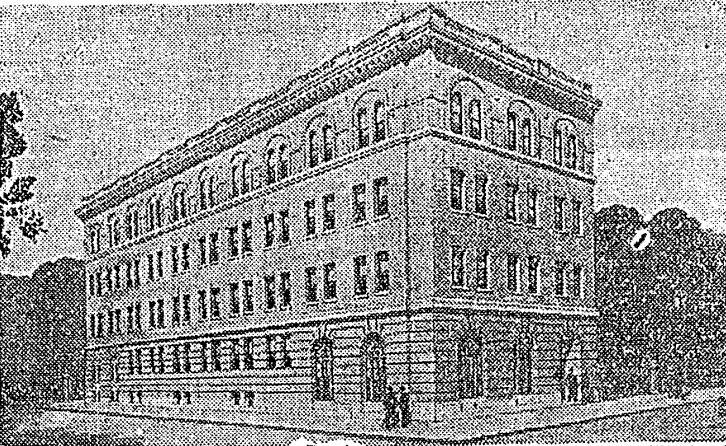
- 1916 Illustration from the Chicago Tribune
- Interactive map of the Inn at Lincoln Park area

General information
- Location: 601 W. Diversey Parkway, Chicago, Illinois
- Coordinates: 41°53′55.8″N 87°38′08.1″W
- Completed: 1916

Technical details
- Floor count: 4

Design and construction
- Architect: Robert C. Berlin

Website
- http://www.innlp.com/

The Inn at Lincoln Park is a hotel at 601 W. Diversey in Chicago's Lincoln Park neighborhood.

== History ==
Originally called the Bentmere Hotel, the building was built in 1916 at a cost of $150,000. It was designed by Robert C. Berlin and was originally owned by Leon A. Bentley. Vincent Drucci resided at the Bentmere for a time. By the 1990s, the building was a Comfort Inn, and by 2004, it was the Inn at Lincoln Park. Plans to demolish the building and construct a new larger hotel were put forward in 2004 and 2014, and faced significant community opposition.
