= Genna crime family =

Prohibition-era Chicago crime family

- Founded by: Genna Brothers
- Founding location: Chicago, Illinois, United States
- Years active: 1919–1930
- Territory: Based in Chicago's Little Italy
- Ethnicity: Sicilian
- Membership (est.): 6 members, 20-30 associates
- Criminal activities: Racketeering, extortion, bootlegging, illegal gambling and other crimes
- Allies: Chicago Outfit (until 1924), Unione Siciliana
- Rivals: North Side Gang

The Genna crime family (Italian pronunciation: [ˈdʒɛnna]), was a crime family that operated in Prohibition-era Chicago. From 1921 to 1925, the family was headed by the six Genna brothers, known as the Terrible Gennas. The brothers were Sicilians from the town of Marsala and operated from Chicago's Little Italy and maintained control over the Unione Siciliana. They were allies with fellow Italian gang the Chicago Outfit. After a bloody war led to their demise in the 1920s, the gang was eventually absorbed by the Chicago Outfit.

== The Genna brothers ==
The Genna brothers consisted of six Sicilian brothers. Vincenzo "James" Genna was the leader of the gang. Angelo "Bloody Angelo" Genna, the youngest of the six, was the family's primary enforcer, and participated heavily in the 19th ward political wars of the late 1920s. Mike "The Devil" was generally kept busy with low-level violent tasks. Antonio "The Gentleman" Genna remained aloof from the day-to-day gang activities, preferring to remain behind the scenes. Sam Genna oversaw the gangs political connections and Peter ran a saloon. In 1919, the Gennas became involved in bootlegging; they obtained a federal license to legally manufacture industrial alcohol, which they sold illegally. The Genna brothers operated from Chicago's Little Italy, bordered by the Chicago River in the east, Kinzie street in the north, Kedzie avenue in the west, and Roosevelt road in the south.

At the onset of Prohibition, the Genna gang was a member of Torrio's beer cartel, agreeing to sell its alcohol only within its territory. By 1924, the Genna brothers had begun selling their extra alcohol at cut-rate prices outside their territory. This produced a clash with the North Side Gang leader Dean O'Banion, who went to John "Johnny The Fox" Torrio and Unione Siciliana boss Mike Merlo to punish the Gennas for breaking the deal. Torrio failed to act and O'Banion and his gang began hijacking shipments of booze that belonged to the Genna brothers. In May 1924, O'Banion set Torrio up to be arrested at the Sieben Brewery, kicking off the "Beer Wars". Merlo, who had been key in keeping the peace, died in November 1924. The next day, Genna hitmen John Scalise and Albert Anselmi, joined by Frankie Yale, shot and killed O'Banion at his flower shop.

== Gang war ==
After O'Banion's murder, the new North Side Gang leader, Hymie Weiss, negotiated a temporary truce with the Gennas. The North Siders focused on attacking the Torrio-Capone gang, first shooting up Al Capone's car in January 1925, then nearly killing Torrio in an ambush outside his home later that month. After leaving the hospital, Torrio fled to Italy, leaving Al Capone as boss.

By spring 1925, North Side Gang was targeting the Genna brothers. First, Bloody Angelo Genna was killed on May 27, 1925, after a high-speed car chase, then shot him to death. On June 13, 1925, Mike Genna was gunned down by police after a shootout with the North Siders. Antonio Genna was shot to death on July 8, 1925, in an ambush. The remaining three brothers Jim, Sam, and Pete fled Chicago.

== D'Andrea and the Unione Siciliana ==
Anthony D'Andrea was a Sicilian Mafia boss in Chicago's Little Italy. His closest allies were the Genna brothers, who operated illegal gambling clubs and salons in his territory. In 1919, D'Andrea became president of the Chicago chapter of the Unione Siciliana, an organization dedicated to helping poor Sicilian immigrants. D'Andrea wanted more political power, and ran to become alderman of Chicago's 19th Ward, which included Little Italy. This started the Aldermen's Wars between D'Andrea and John Powers, an Irish saloon-keeper who was the sitting alderman. On May 11, 1921, D'Andrea was shot and killed while entering his apartment.

== Joe Aiello and the last fight ==
Giuseppe "Joe" Aiello and his brothers Salvatore "Sam" and Pietro "Peter" declared themselves bosses of the old Genna brothers territory of Little Italy. The Aiello brothers had an alliance with the Castellammarese Clan boss Salvatore Maranzano and close connection to the North Side Gang. The brothers attempted to murder Al Capone and become the most powerful organization in Chicago. Giuseppe Aiello was murdered in 1930 and Capone took over all Italian organized crime.

== Members of Chicago's Sicilian Mafia ==
=== Bosses ===
- 1919-1921 — Anthony D'Andrea – led the Unione Siciliana backed by the Gennas. He was murdered on May 11, 1921.
- 1921-1925 — Angelo Genna – murdered on May 27, 1925.
- 1925 — Samuzzo Amatuna – led the Unione Siciliana. He was murdered on November 13, 1925.
- 1925-1930 — Joseph Aiello – murdered on October 23, 1930.

=== Other members ===
- Antonio Genna – murdered on July 8, 1925.
- Mike Genna – murdered on June 13, 1925.
- Vincenzo Genna died November 8, 1931
- Peter Genna died May 13, 1948
- Sam Genna died Dec 20, 1951
- Mariano Zagone – Black Hand; murdered in May 1909.
- Joseph "Diamond Joe" Esposito – murdered on March 21, 1928.
- Samuzzo Amatuna - Angelo's bodyguard; became boss after Angelo's death; Unione Siciliana president; murdered on November 13, 1925.

=== Rival ===
- Rosario Dispenza – Black Hand member and was a Morello crime family Chicago contact. Dispenza was murdered in 1914.
- Salvatore Cardinella gang – also operated in Little Italy and Little Sicily.

== See also ==
- Italians in Chicago
