= Joseph Giunta (mobster) =

Italian-American mobster (1887–1929)

Joseph "Hop Toad" Giunta (1887 – May 7, 1929), was an American mobster with the Chicago Outfit. He was born in Cicero, Illinois. He was of Italian descent.

== Biography ==
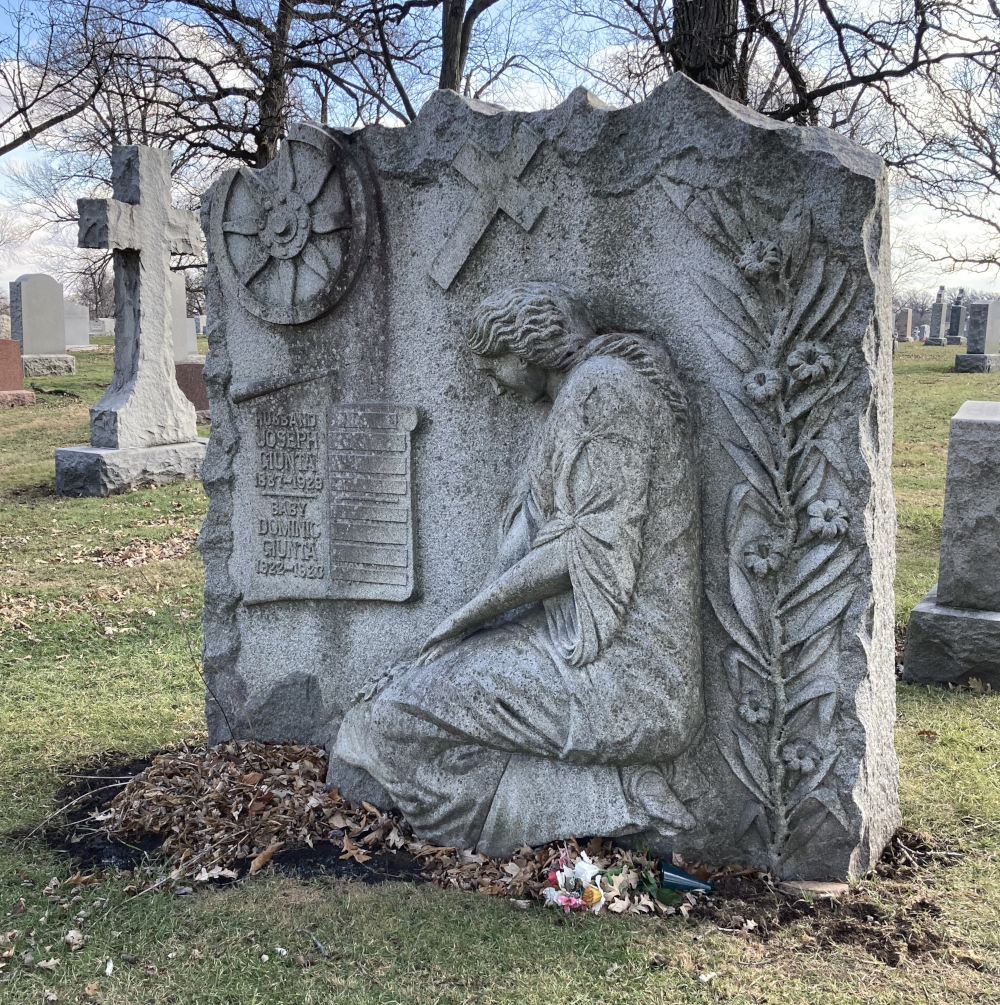
Giunta's grave at Mount Carmel Cemetery

After the murder of Unione Siciliana president Pasqualino "Patsy" Lolordo, Giunta became the new president of the Siciliana in 1929. He unsuccessfully tried to organize a revolt against Al Capone's gang. As a result, according to legend, Giunta and his co-conspirators (Albert Anselmi and John Scalise) were beaten and shot to death by Capone at a party. Their bodies were found the next day in Hammond, Indiana.

Giunta was buried at Mount Carmel Cemetery in Hillside, Illinois.

Business positions
Preceded by Pasqualino Lolordo	Unione Siciliana; President; 1929	Succeeded by Giuseppe Aiello
