= Robert Vanella =

Italian-American crime figure and businessman

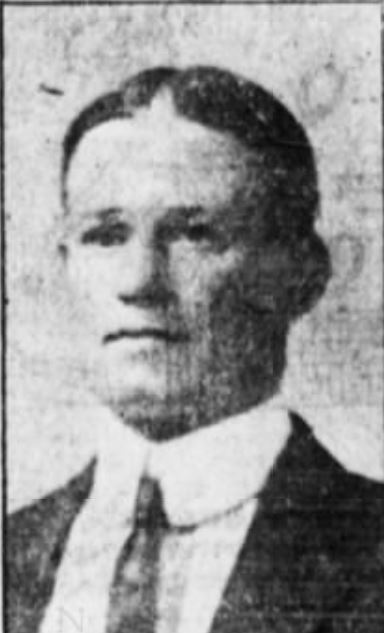
- Born: May 15, 1879; New York City, U.S.
- Died: May 10, 1928 (aged 48); New York City, U.S.
- Resting place: Calvary Cemetery, Queens, New York City, U.S.
- Other names: Mayor of James Street, Roxie, Rocco Vanella, Rocco Venille
- Occupations: Mobster, funeral director
- Conviction: Second degree murder (1908)
- Penalty: 50 years' imprisonment; released after six years

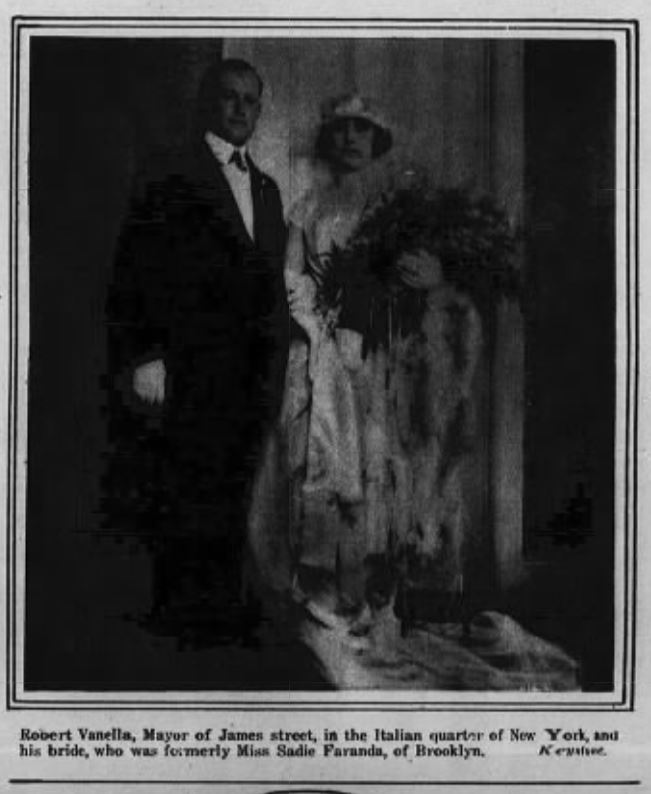
Wedding Photo of Robert Vanella and Sadie Faranda, July 24, 1921

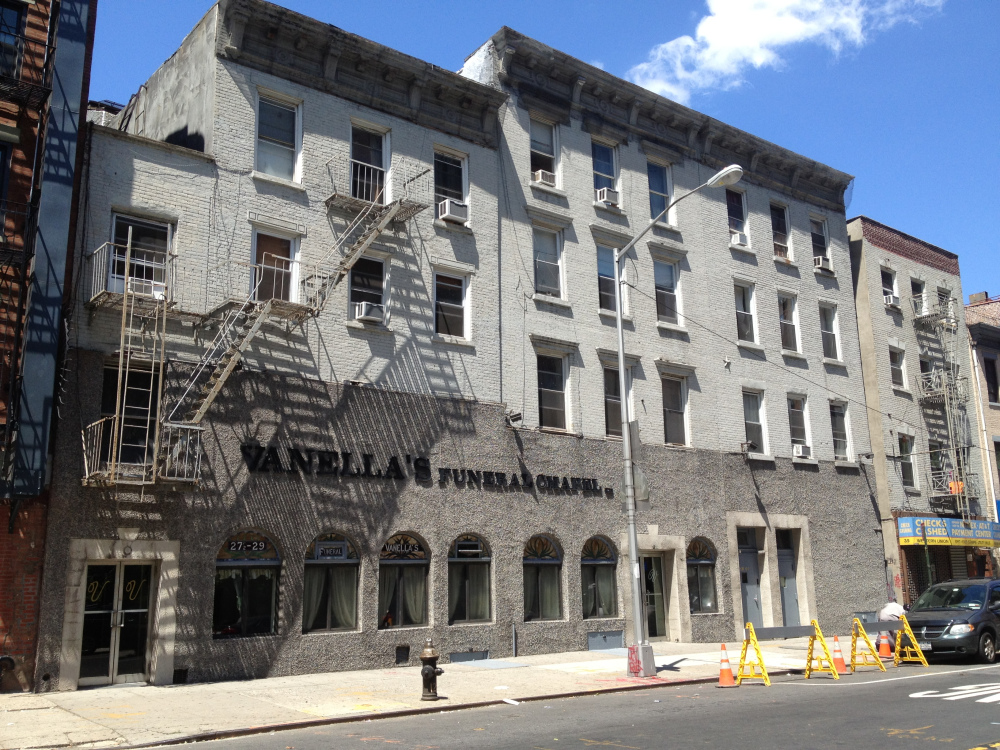
Vanella's Funeral Chapel at 29 Madison Street (June 2018)

Robert "Roxie" Vanella (May 15, 1879 – May 10, 1928) was an American crime figure of Italian descent. He was associated with Johnny Torrio, Big Jim Colosimo, Frankie Yale and Al Capone during the Prohibition era. In his later years, Vanella became a businessman and union organizer operating from the Lower East Side neighborhood of New York City, where he became fondly known as the "Mayor of James Street."

== Early life ==
Vanella was born and raised at 68 James Street in Manhattan to Giuseppe Vanella and Gerarda Tramutola, both of whom hailed from Potenza in the Region of Basilicata, Italy. One of his neighbors was a young John Torrio, recently arrived to the United States with his widowed mother from Irsina, from the same region in the province of Matera, and whose stepfather was running an illegal moonshine still across the street from Vanella's home. By the time the two boys were teenagers they helped form the James Street Gang, an East River auxiliary for Paul Kelly's Five Points Gang.

== Criminal career ==
=== Move to Montana and murder conviction ===
By 1907, Vanella and Torrio had parted ways and Vanella relocated to the American Midwest. On October 13, 1907, Vanella was arrested in Laurel, Montana and charged with the shooting death two days earlier of his roommate and associate, Raffaele Orasio (sometimes spelled Raffael Orasse). Vanella's trial began on January 22, 1908, at which a witness testified to having seen Vanella run down an alley with a coat over his arm after shots had been fired by police. On January 25, 1908, Vanella was convicted of second-degree murder and sentenced to 50 years in prison at the Montana State Prison at Deer Lodge. However, a public campaign for Vanella's release was launched by his mother in New York and by socialite Ethel Eppstein of San Francisco, claiming that Vanella had been unfairly convicted entirely on circumstantial evidence. At the same time, the chief witness against Vanella, Louis Fava, was later found dead in Taft, Montana in September 1908. On December 24, 1913, Vanella received a Christmas Eve commutation of his sentence from Governor Sam V. Stewart to twelve years. In April 1914 Vanella was released on parole by the state board of pardons, having served only six years of his original 50-year sentence.

=== Second brush with the law in Chicago ===
Following his release from prison, Vanella moved to Chicago to reconnect with Torrio. A few months later, the two were implicated in the July 1914 death of Chicago Police Sergeant Stanley Birns, who was killed by friendly police fire during a vice raid. Newspapers at the time reported that Vanella was affiliated with the "Black Hand"—a pre-Mafia form of extortion attributed to Italian men from Calabria and Sicily who would send anonymous notes to their victims emblazoned with a feared old country symbol. The State's Attorney alleged that Vanella, identified as "Rocco Venille," had been hired by local property owners in a botched attempt to assassinate a senior vice police inspector. Charges were filed against Vanella, Torrio and fellow Chicago crime figure Jim Colosimo, but the cases were never brought to trial and Vanella returned to New York City.

=== Return to James Street ===
Upon returning to New York, Vanella turned himself into a successful and politically connected businessman and became known as the "Mayor of James Street." Over the next few years he organized and ultimately became president of the Ragpicker's Union, as well as a Democratic district captain on the Tammany Hall staff of Thomas F. "Big Tom" Foley. In 1918, Vanella and his younger brother, Vincenzo (Vincent) James Vanella, founded Vanella's Funeral Chapel at 27-29 Madison Street. While Vanella had no further legal entanglements he continued to publicly associate with crime figures such as Torrio and Brooklyn crime figure Frankie Yale.

In May 1921, Vanella met Rosario (Sadie) Faranda, the daughter of Antonio Faranda who owned Faranda & Sons in Laurel Hill, Long Island, while advising a client on a headstone. Two months later the two were married at an extravagant wedding ceremony at the Roman Catholic Church of St. Joachim, at 22 Roosevelt Street, with over 150 vehicles and 1,000 guests. Torrio, who came in from Chicago to serve as Vanella's best man, reportedly travelled in a private train car with fifty of his own guests in tow.

== Later years and death ==
Vanella and Faranda resided at 31 Madison Street and together had three daughters. Seven years after their wedding Vanella died on May 10, 1928, at the age of 48. He was interred at Vanella's Funeral Chapel and laid to rest at Calvary Cemetery in Queens following a funeral procession consisting of over 300 vehicles.

In 1940, more than ten years after Vanella's death, it was reported that he, Torrio, Al Capone, and Jack Cusick, were co-owners of a 28-acre plot of real estate in St. Petersburg, Florida that was seized by the Internal Revenue Service and sold at auction to satisfy Capone's tax delinquencies.

== Vanella's Funeral Chapel ==
Vanella's Funeral Chapel continued in operation for nearly a century after its founding, together with a second location established on Long Beach Road in Oceanside, New York in 1965. Beginning in 2016, family infighting and litigation ultimately led to the closing of both chapels and a change in control of the family businesses. The Oceanside property was sold to a third party property developer in May 2017, and the property located at 27-29 Madison Street was sold in January 2019 for just under $8 million.
