= Vincent Drucci =

American mobster

- Drucci mugshot
- Born: Ludovico D'Ambrosio; January 1, 1898; Chicago, Illinois, U.S.
- Died: April 4, 1927 (aged 29); Chicago, Illinois, U.S.
- Cause of death: Gunshots
- Other names: "The Schemer"
- Occupation: Mobster
- Allegiance: North Side Gang

Vincent Drucci (born Ludovico D'Ambrosio; January 1, 1898 – April 4, 1927), also known as "The Schemer", was an American mobster during Chicago's Prohibition era who was a member of the North Side Gang, Al Capone's best known rivals. A friend of Dean O'Banion, Drucci succeeded him by becoming co-leader. He is one of the only American organized crime bosses to have been killed by a policeman.

== Early years ==
Drucci was born Ludovico D'Ambrosio in Chicago, Illinois, on January 1, 1898, to Italian parents from northern Italy. After serving in the U.S. Navy, he returned to Chicago and started committing small-time crimes such as breaking open pay telephone coin boxes. He joined Dean O'Banion's North Side Gang, which had taken over the formerly legal breweries and distilleries in that part of the city giving them massive profits from illicit production of alcohol, in addition to shakedowns and other rackets. Often described as mainly Irish-American, after O'Banion's death the North Side Gang was successively headed by Hymie Weiss, Drucci and Bugs Moran who were respectively of Polish, Italian and French descent, while the most influential members who never became leader were Louis Alterie, of Spanish parentage, Samuel Morton who was from a Jewish background, and the German Albert Kachellek.

Though a leading member of the relatively small gang, Drucci acted as enforcer and was actively involved in numerous violent incidents; on one occasion when ambushed in the street by gunmen with a Capone trademark driveby, he charged at the assailants and tried to give chase in a hijacked car.

Laurence Bergreen, in his book, Capone: The Man and the Era, describes Drucci:

He had a streak of recklessness and daring, and he looked the part of a gangster – tough, dark, and menacing, his expression frozen in a tragic mask topped by wild unkempt hair (and) a face to haunt the dreams of his enemies.

== "The Schemer" ==
He was known by the nickname "The Schemer", in part because of his penchant for inebriated rumination about outlandish plans; in reality he operated by intimidation in activities such as extortion of money from legitimate businesses. One female shop owner who refused to pay was beaten up by a husky woman under Drucci's orders. Drucci, whose practical jokes including making salacious comments to couples on the street while dressed as a priest, performed in a 1923 pornographic film called Bob's Hot Story.

Drucci was believed to have been responsible for a November 30, 1926, incident at a Chicago North Side garage. In what the Chicago Tribune described as a "serio-comedy", Drucci, along with North Side Gang members Bugs Moran, Frank Gusenberg, and Pete Gusenberg, are alleged to have entered the garage where two Chicago police officers were securing fifty cases of seized beer. Claiming to be a federal agent, Drucci ordered the others to handcuff the officers and confiscate their guns, showing no interest in the seized beer, and left with the officers still handcuffed. The incident humiliated the Chicago police department, which was already more sympathetic to the North Sider's rivals the Capone organization.

== Conflict with South Side ==
The North Siders found themselves undercut on the price of alcohol by rivals the Genna crime family, which was allied to the Italian American South side gang led by Johnny Torrio, who had pretensions of citywide overlordship. O'Banion at first tried to get Torrio to rein in the Gennas. When Torrio failed to do so, O'Banion started hijacking the Gennas' shipments. The Gennas wanted to kill O'Banion but Sicilian politician Mike Merlo, head of the Chicago chapter of Unione Siciliana and an underworld power broker due to his political influence, vetoed the killing. On November 10, 1924, days after Merlo had died of an illness, Torrio men John Scalise and Albert Anselmi arrived at O'Banion's Chicago flower shop ostensibly arranging floral tributes for Merlo's funeral, and murdered O'Banion. The North Side gang then moved against the Gennas and the South Side gang in retaliation. As a result of O'Banion's death the leadership fell to Hymie Weiss, who initiated a string of retaliatory attacks on the Gennas and Torrio.

On January 25, 1925, Drucci, Weiss, and Moran ambushed Torrio's bodyguard-lieutenant, Al Capone, shooting up his car, but failing to kill him; his bodyguard was then kidnapped, tortured and murdered. On January 27, Drucci and the two other North Siders ambushed Torrio while he was shopping with his wife. While severely wounded, Torrio survived the attack. At one point, police brought Drucci and Weiss to Torrio's hospital bedside, but Torrio refused to identify them as the shooters. After his recovery and a short jail term, Torrio relinquished control of the South Side Gang to Capone and returned to Italy.

On May 25, Drucci, Weiss, and Moran killed South Side ally Angelo Genna. On July 8, Drucci and a second gunman murdered Tony Genna. On November 13, they murdered Genna gunman Samuzzo Amatuna in a barber shop. The owner of his favorite restaurant was also kidnapped and murdered, and Capone began referring to Drucci as the "bedbug".

== Gang warfare ==
On August 10, 1926, Drucci and Weiss were ambushed by Capone gunmen on a Chicago street and shot their way out. Five days later, Drucci and Weiss exchanged shots with Capone's men in a re-run assassination attempt at the same location. The North Side Gang responded with an even more high-profile assassination attempt, using a ploy to lure Capone to the front of the Cicero, Illinois hotel in which he lived, and then firing hundreds of rounds through the windows. Capone was shaken, but unhurt. On October 11, Capone's men killed Weiss outside the Holy Name Cathedral as he walked from his car to the gang's headquarters. Drucci and Moran now assumed leadership of the North Side Gang. After Weiss' shooting, Drucci and Moran attended a peace conference with all the Chicago gangs, including the South Siders. Although Moran wanted to keep fighting, Drucci persuaded him to accept a ceasefire.

In 1927 William Hale Thompson at the head of his powerful Cook County machine that included strong support among African American districts, attempted to return as mayor. Thompson's campaign statements were interpreted as an indication that if he won the city would have a relaxed attitude to law enforcement, and he was seen as Capone's man. There were complex interactions between the political and ethnic aspects of the rivalries. Irish American politicians attempted to paint Thompson as an anti-Catholic Anglo Saxon chauvinist, despite his Capone-influenced Italian first ward support. However, Thompson's perceived beholdenness to African American voters also led to shifting of allegiance among voters, which partially nullified his political machine. Capone resorted to an escalation of violence to ensure the political contest would be decided in Thompson's favour. A citywide gang war erupted at the prospect of Capone getting a mayor inimical to all his rivals. On April 3, 1927, Drucci decided to take the offensive by ransacking the office of Dever-supporting alderman Dorsey Crowe. The Chicago Police Department Chief then ordered his men to arrest all North Side gang members on sight.

== Death ==
On April 4, 1927, Chicago police arrested Drucci and found a concealed .45 pistol. One of the arresting officers was Detective Dan Healy, who had shot an armed robber dead a few months earlier. Exploits such as a near-fatal beating of Capone rival, Joseph Saltis, during a November 1926 saloon raid, had gained Healy a reputation for apoplectic violence against criminals, though not always in the line of duty.

Drucci objected to being held by the arm while waiting for the car that would take him and two associates arrested at the same time to the courthouse, where Drucci's lawyer was waiting to post bail. He insulted Healy, who responded with a slap, then drew and brandished his gun and threatened to shoot Drucci. In the car the argument continued. One account is that the policemen who had been present during the incident supported Healy's version of events: that Drucci, while announcing his intention, had lunged for Healy's gun, but Healy had drawn back then shot Drucci. Drucci's two associates gave a different account, asserting that a scuffle started after Healy punched Drucci, causing the driver to halt the car at the roadside, whereupon Healy had got out on the running board before drawing and firing at Drucci, who was shot while sitting in the car, handcuffed, with his hands in his lap. Hit in the arm, leg, and abdomen, Drucci collapsed, dying on the floor of the car.

== Aftermath ==
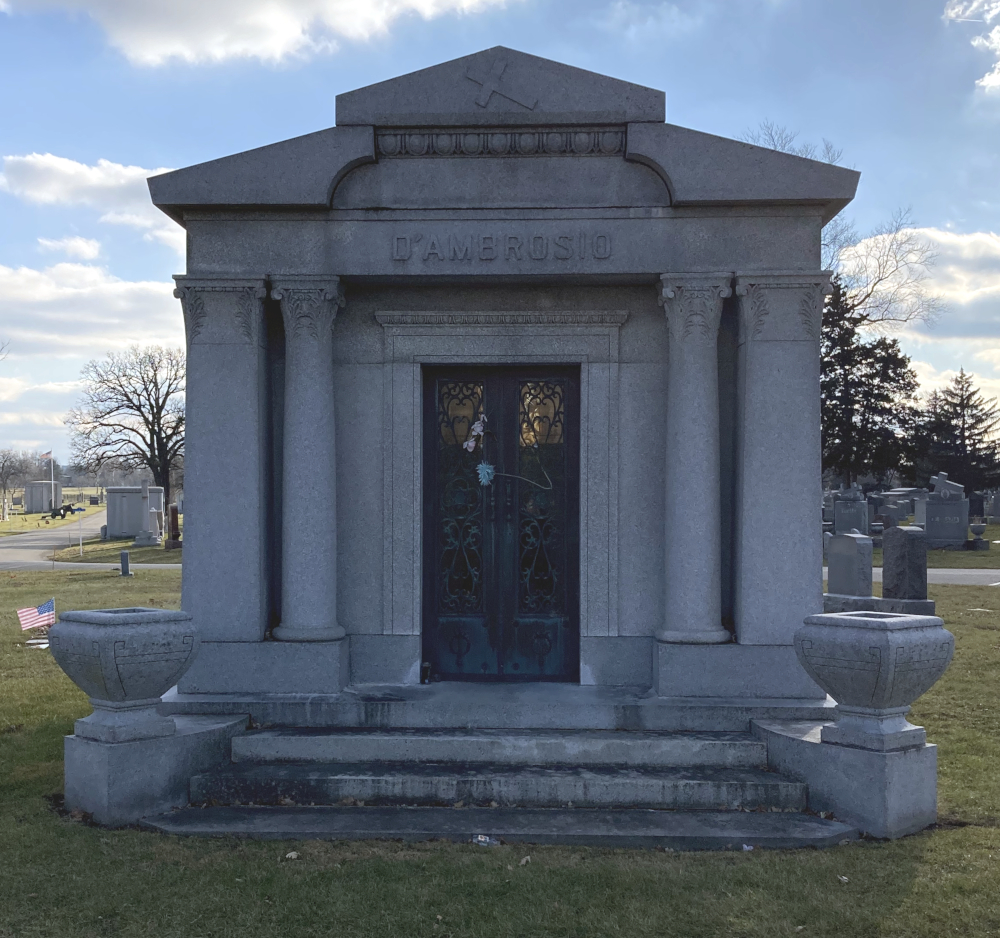
D'Ambrosio mausoleum at Mount Carmel Cemetery

He received a lavish funeral at Mount Carmel Cemetery in Hillside, Illinois, that was typical gangland fashion at the time. Drucci's silver casket cost $10,000 and more than $30,000 in flowers adorned the funeral rooms. Healy and the other policemen's version of the death was accepted by the authorities. Drucci's estate amounted to $500,000.

Capone continued to back Thompson, and on the polling day of April 10, 1928, in the so-called Pineapple Primary, voting booths in the wards known to oppose Thompson were targeted by Capone's bomber, James Belcastro, causing the deaths of 15 people. Belcastro also was accused of the murder of a black candidate in the election who had been chased by cars of gunmen through the streets on polling day before being shot dead; four police officers were accused along with Belcastro. An indication of the attitude of local law enforcement to Capone's organization came in 1931 when Belcastro was shot in an attempt on his life; police suggested to skeptical journalists that Belcastro was an independent operator. The North Side gang was finished as a force in the underworld by the 1929 Saint Valentine's Day massacre. However, the massacre led to public disquiet about Thompson's alliance with Capone, a factor in Anton J. Cermak winning the mayoral election on April 6, 1931. A remnant of the North Side persisted alongside the similarly weak Roger Touhy, but got eliminated during Capone's push back against the allies of Cermak.

Preceded by Hymie Weiss	North Side Gang Boss; 1926-1927	Succeeded by George "Bugs" Moran
