= Francesca Genna =

Italian artist

Francesca Genna (born 1967 in Marsala) is an Italian academic, printmaker and artist.

== Early life and education ==
Francesca Genna was born in 1967 in Marsala, Sicily, and undertook her early studies in painting at the Accademia di Belle Arti di Venezia, later studying printmaking at the Scuola Internazionale per la Grafica d'Arte Il Bisonte in Florence.

== Career ==
Genna began exhibiting in Italy in 1985. In the 1990s, her etchings were presented in major exhibitions in Germany, Switzerland, France, Italy and the United States. Early works include Landscape, Tuscany (1993) printed on hand-made paper with wide decked margins. It was followed in 1998 by Tree Study, Tuscany, printed on hand-made paper. The large engraving was created by both aquatint and drypoint techniques, exploring texture together with light and shade.

Genna has held the title of Professor of Engraving Techniques at the Accademia di Belle Arti di Palermo since 2001. Since 2004 her research interests have focused on the development of environmentally-sustainable etching techniques, a topic on which she has published and lectured extensively, and on the artist's book as a mode of international, interdisciplinary exchange. With colleague Carla Horat, Genna founded the Horat-Genna Archivio di libri d’artista at the Accademia di Belle Arti di Palermo as a repository for artists' books created in connection with the academy's programs.

In 2003, she returned to live in Sicily. In addition to two published books, she has lectured widely, with presentations at the Polytechnic University of Valencia (2010), the Accademia di Belle Arti in Rome (2013) and the Academy of Fine Arts, Nuremberg (2016).

An exhibition of Francesca Genna's prints was organized by the Associazione Italiana di Architettura e Critica at the Interno 14 gallery in Rome in September 2016.

== Awards ==
In 2013, Francesca Genna received the European Award for Lifelong Passions - La Seconda Luna. It was in recognition of her research and experimentation with sustainable engraving.

== Selected publications ==
- Genna, Francesca, and Patrick Aubert. 2009. Incisione sostenibile: nuovi materiali e metodi dell'area non-toxic. Marsala [etc.]: Navarra.
- Genna, Francesca. 2015. Materiali e metodi per l'incisione sostenibile: alcune esperienze. Marsala: Navarra.
