= Johnny Torrio =

Italian mob boss (1882–1957)

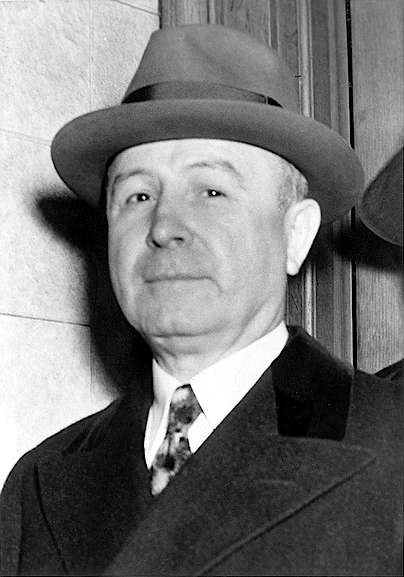
- Torrio in 1939
- Born: Donato Torrio; January 20, 1882; Montepeloso, Basilicata, Kingdom of Italy
- Died: April 16, 1957 (aged 75); New York City, U.S.
- Resting place: Green-Wood Cemetery, Brooklyn, U.S.
- Other names: The Fox; The Brain; Papa Johnny; Terrible Johnny; The Immune
- Occupation: Crime boss
- Predecessor: Big Jim Colosimo
- Successor: Al Capone
- Spouse: Anna Theodosia Jacobs (m. 1912)
- Status: Released
- Allegiance: Chicago Outfit
- Conviction: Tax evasion (1939)
- Penalty: 2 years' imprisonment (1939)

John Donato Torrio (born Donato Torrio, Italian: [doˈnaːto ˈtɔrrjo]; January 20, 1882 – April 16, 1957) was an Italian-born mobster who helped build the Chicago Outfit in the 1920s later inherited by his protégé Al Capone. Torrio proposed a National Crime Syndicate in the 1930s and later became an adviser to Lucky Luciano and his Luciano crime family.

Torrio had several nicknames, primarily "The Fox" for his cunning and finesse. The US Treasury official Elmer Irey considered him "the biggest gangster in America" and wrote, "He was the smartest and, I dare say, the best of all the hoodlums. 'Best' referring to talent, not morals." Virgil W. Peterson of the Chicago Crime Commission stated that his "talents as an organizational genius were widely respected by the major gang bosses in the New York City area". Crime journalist Herbert Asbury affirmed: "As an organizer and administrator of underworld affairs, Johnny Torrio is unsurpassed in the annals of American crime; he was probably the nearest thing to a real mastermind that this country has yet produced".

== Early life ==
Torrio was born in Irsina (then known as Montepeloso), Basilicata, in Southern Italy, to Tommaso Torrio and Maria Carluccio originally from Altamura, Apulia. When he was two his father, a railway employee, died in a work accident; shortly after, Torrio immigrated to James Street on the Lower East Side of New York City with his widowed mother in December 1884. She later remarried.

His first jobs were as a porter and bouncer in Manhattan. While he was a teenager, he joined a street gang together with another James Street resident Robert Vanella and became its leader; he eventually managed to save enough money and opened a billiards parlor for the group, and from there grew illegal activities such as gambling and loan sharking. Torrio's business sense caught the eye of Paul Kelly, the leader of the Five Points Gang. Torrio's gang ran legitimate businesses, but its primary concern was the numbers game, supplemented by incomes from bookmaking, loan sharking, hijacking, prostitution, and opium trafficking. Al Capone, who worked at Kelly's club, admired Torrio's quick mind and looked to him as his mentor.

Capone had belonged to the Junior Forty Thieves, the Bowery Boys and the Brooklyn Rippers; they soon moved up to the Five Points Gang. One of Torrio's associates, Frankie Yale, eventually hired Capone to bartend at the Harvard Inn, a bar in the Coney Island section of Brooklyn, New York.

== Move to Chicago ==
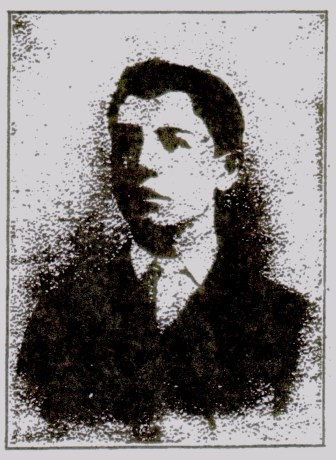
Torrio in 1903

By 1909, Torrio moved to Chicago. "Big Jim" Colosimo, who had become head of a burgeoning vice empire in Chicago is reputed to have invited him to the city to help him deal with Black Hand extortionists. One of these instances is assumed to be the death of Black Hand extortionists Felice Danello, Stefano Danello, and Pasquale Damico on the night of November 22, 1911. At the Rock Island Railroad underpass at Archer near Clark St., Felice and Damico were killed by a hail of bullets, with Stefano dying weeks later in the hospital. Torrio became a top lieutenant in Colosimo's organization, rising to underboss by 1914.

In 1919, Al Capone arrived in Chicago and started working as a bouncer and bartender at one of the Colosimo gang establishments, the Four Deuces at 2222 S. Wabash Street.

== Colosimo murder ==
When Prohibition went into effect in 1920, Torrio pushed for the gang to enter into bootlegging, but Colosimo stubbornly refused. In March 1920, Colosimo secured an uncontested divorce from Victoria Moresco. A month later, he and singer Dale Winter, the star attraction at his club, eloped to West Baden Springs, Indiana. Upon their return, he bought a home on the South Side. On May 11, 1920, Colosimo drove to Colosimo's Cafe to meet an associate he had never met before. He was shot and killed a few minutes after entering the restaurant by a gunman hiding in the cloak room. A bullet entered Colosimo's brain, behind his right ear. Contract killer Frankie Yale had allegedly traveled from New York to Chicago and personally killed longtime gang boss Colosimo at the behest of Torrio. Although suspected by Chicago police, Yale was never officially charged. Colosimo was allegedly murdered because he stood in the way of his gang making bootlegging profits, having "gone soft" after his marriage with Winter.

== Rivalry with North Side Gang ==
Torrio headed an essentially Italian organized crime group that was the biggest in the city, with Capone as his right-hand man. However, many other gangs were active in Chicago at this time, and Torrio was wary of being drawn into gang wars and tried to negotiate agreements over territory between rival crime groups. In 1920, Torrio built an agreement between most of Chicago's bootlegging gangs into a city-wide cartel. The smaller North Side Gang led by Dean O'Banion was of mixed ethnicity and was a member of the bootlegging cartel. In 1924, the North Side Gang discovered that the Genna brothers, close to Torrio's gang, were selling their booze in North Side Gang territory. O'Banion went to Torrio, who was unhelpful with the encroachment of the Gennas into the North Side despite his pretensions to be a settler of disputes. As a result, the North Side Gang responded by hijacking Genna beer shipments.

In May 1924, O'Banion learned that the police planned to raid the Sieben brewery on a particular night. Before the raid, O'Banion approached Torrio and told him he wanted to sell his share in the brewery, claiming that he wanted to leave the rackets and retire to Colorado. Torrio agreed to buy O'Banion's share and gave him half a million dollars. On the morning of the deal, the police (including the police chief) raided and shut down the brewery. Torrio, O'Banion, and several others were arrested. Torrio was indicted on bootlegging charges, a repeat offense for him with mandatory jail time. Torrio realized he had been betrayed and conned out of $500,000 by O'Banion.

Torrio would have immediately attempted to retaliate against O'Banion and the North Side Gang had it not been for Mike Merlo, head of the Unione Siciliana labor organization. Merlo had a vested interest in keeping the peace between Chicago's gangs, and he convinced Torrio to forestall any violence against the North Side Gang.

Mike Merlo died of cancer on November 8, 1924. On November 10, three men entered O'Banion's Schofield's Flowers shop under the pretense of buying flowers for Merlo's funeral and shot O'Banion dead. The killers are reputed to have been Frankie Yale, John Scalise, and Albert Anselmi, acting on Torrio's behalf.

O'Banion's death placed Hymie Weiss at the head of the North Side Gang, backed by Vincent Drucci and Bugs Moran. Weiss had been a close friend of O'Banion, and the North Siders made it a priority to get revenge on his killers.

== Assassination attempt and handover to Capone ==
In January 1925, Capone was ambushed, leaving him shaken but unhurt. Twelve days later, on January 24, Torrio and his wife Anna were ambushed outside their home by Weiss, Drucci, and Moran. Torrio was shot several times and nearly killed. After recovering, he effectively resigned, handed control of the gang to Capone, and fled to New York.

In late 1925, Torrio moved to Italy with his wife and mother, where he no longer dealt directly with the mob business. He gave total control of the Outfit to Capone and said, "It's all yours, Al. Me? I'm quitting. It's Europe for me." Torrio left a criminal empire which grossed about $70,000,000 a year ($1,241,304,000 in 2024 dollars) from bootleg liquor, gambling and prostitution.

== Later years and death ==
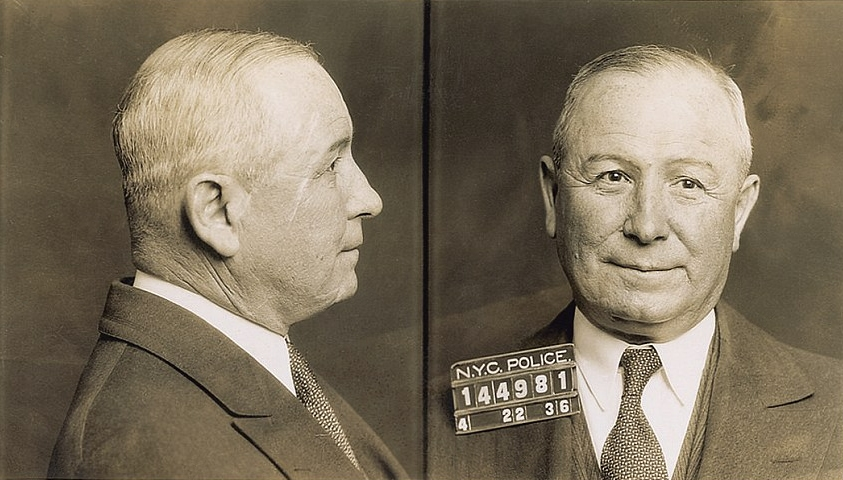
Torrio following his 1936 arrest for tax evasion

In 1928, Torrio returned to the United States, as Benito Mussolini began putting pressure on the Mafia in Italy. He is credited with helping to organize a loose cartel of East Coast bootleggers, the Big Seven, in which many prominent gangsters, including Lucky Luciano, Longy Zwillman, Joe Adonis, Frank Costello, and Meyer Lansky played a part. Torrio also supported the creation of a national body that would prevent all-out turf wars between gangs that had broken out in Chicago and New York. His idea was well received, and a conference was hosted in Atlantic City by Torrio, Lansky, Luciano and Costello in May 1929; the National Crime Syndicate was created.

Torrio was charged with income tax evasion in 1936 and, after several failed appeals, was sent to prison in 1939, serving two years. In 1940, a property that Torrio co-owned with Vanella, Jack Cusick, and Capone was sold at auction to satisfy Capone's tax delinquencies. After his release, he lived quietly until his death.

On April 16, 1957, Torrio had a heart attack in the Brooklyn borough of New York City, New York while he was sitting in a barber's chair waiting for a haircut; he died several hours later in a nearby hospital.

== In popular culture ==
Torrio has been portrayed several times in television and motion pictures:

- by Osgood Perkins in the 1932 film, Scarface (as Johnny Lovo).
- by Nehemiah Persoff in the 1959 film, Al Capone.
- by Charles McGraw in the 1959 television series of The Untouchables.
- by Harry Guardino in the 1975 film, Capone.
- by Guy Barile in the 1992 film, The Babe.
- by Frank Vincent in the 1993 The Young Indiana Jones Chronicles episode "Young Indiana Jones and the Mystery of the Blues".
- by Byrne Piven in the pilot episode of the 1993 television series, The Untouchables.
- by Kieron Jecchinis in a 1994 episode of the television series, In Suspicious Circumstances entitled "No Witness, No Case".
- by Greg Antonacci in the HBO series, Boardwalk Empire.
- by Paolo Rotondo in the 2016 television miniseries The Making of the Mob: Chicago.
- by Al Sapienza in the 2017 film Gangster Land.

American Mafia
Unknown	Chicago Outfit; Underboss; 1910–1920	Succeeded by Al Capone
Preceded by Big Jim Colosimo	Chicago Outfit; Boss; 1920–1925	Succeeded by Al Capone
