= North Side Gang =

Bootlegging gang in Chicago during 1920s

- Founded: 1919
- Founded by: Dean O'Banion; Hymie Weiss
- Founding location: North Side, Chicago, Illinois, U.S.
- Years active: 1919–1935
- Territory: Various neighborhoods in Chicago, mainly Northern Chicago
- Ethnicity: Mainly Irish American, with German American, Polish American, Jewish American, and Italian American members
- Membership (est.): Around 30 members
- Criminal activities: Racketeering, bootlegging, illegal gambling, extortion, robbery, murder
- Rivals: Chicago Outfit and Genna crime family

The North Side Gang, also known as the North Side Mob, was a multi-ethnic criminal organization within Chicago during the Prohibition era from the early 1920s to the mid-1930s. It was the principal rival of the South Side Gang, later known as the Chicago Outfit or Chicago Mafia, the predominantly Italian-American crime syndicate led by Johnny Torrio and Al Capone.

== History of the North Side Gang ==
=== Early history ===
Like many other Chicago-based Prohibition gangs, the North Side Gang originated from the Market Street Gang, one of many street gangs in Chicago at the turn of the 20th century. The Market Street Gang was made up of pickpockets, sneak thieves and labor sluggers working in the 42nd and 43rd Wards. The gang especially distinguished itself during the newspaper "Circulation Wars" of the early 1910s between the Chicago Examiner and the Chicago Tribune.

It was during the Circulation Wars that future North Side leader Dean O'Banion, then a member of the juvenile satellite Little Hellions, would develop valuable contacts with politicians and journalists. O'Banion and other members of the North Siders would be mentored by safecracker Charlie "The Ox" Reiser. O'Banion was one of the many Market Streeters to become a bootlegger.

=== Prohibition ===
With the start of Prohibition, the members of the North Side Gang quickly took control of the existing breweries and distilleries in the North Side of Chicago. This gave them a near monopoly on the local supply of real beer and high quality whiskey; their rivals only had supplies of rotgut liquor and moonshine. Based on the North Clark Street restaurant McGovern's Saloon and Café, the North Side Gang would soon control the working-class neighborhoods of the 42nd and 43rd Wards within months. They controlled a section of downtown that went from Madison street to the Chicago river, eastwards to Lake Michigan. In addition to bootlegging, the gang continued to burglarize local stores and warehouses and run illegal gambling operations. Unlike the rival Chicago Outfit, however, they refused to traffic in prostitution.

William F. Schofield's Flower Shop, and the apartment above the store, served as the North Side Gang's downtown headquarters. This building was located at 738 N. State St., across the street from Holy Name Cathedral. O'Banion himself often worked at the shop, taking up floral arrangement as a personal hobby.

O'Banion strengthened his political protection by assisting his politician friends in committing election fraud. He also ran a publicity campaign in the North Side, with large-scale donations to orphanages and charities as well as food and loans to the poor and unemployed.

The old hostility between Irish and Italian gangs, combined with O'Banion's refusal to sell portions of North Side distilleries to the South Siders, raised tension between the North and South Siders. During several meetings arranged by Torrio, O'Banion would often insult the Italians. O'Banion also secretly hijacked South Side beer shipments and sold them back to their owners. However, the North Side Gang also ran into trouble with other ethnic gangs; in 1921, O'Banion shot Ragen's Colts member Davy "Yiddles" Miller after he insulted a North Sider at a local opera.

Although O'Banion was arrested and charged with burglary in 1922, the North Side Gang enjoyed considerable protection from the Chicago police department. At one point, O'Banion threw a lavish banquet for Chicago politicians and police officials. Attendees included Chief Detective Michael Hughes, Police Lieutenant Charles Evans, County Clerk Robert Sweitzer, public works commissioner Colonel Albert A. Sprague, and a host of both Democratic and Republican politicians. Dubbed the "Balshazzar Feast" by the press, it was later investigated by reform Mayor William E. Dever.

In 1924, Chicago police assisted the North Side Gang in robbing the Sibly Distillery, which had been under federal guard since the beginning of Prohibition. Escorted by Police Lieutenant Michael Grady and four detective sergeants, North Siders looted the distillery in broad daylight, taking 1,750 barrels of bonded whiskey worth approximately $100,000. Although Grady and the other police officers were later indicted for this crime, they were quickly dismissed.

Relations between the North and South Side gangs continued to fester. In early 1924, O'Banion agreed to an alliance with Torrio and Capone that was brokered by Mike Merlo. However, the alliance began to flounder when O'Banion demanded that Angelo Genna pay a $30,000 gambling debt from losses at the co-owned gambling casino The Ship. This demand contravened an agreement allowing Angelo and other gang members to run up debts there. In the interest of maintaining harmony, Torrio persuaded Genna to pay his gambling debt.

However, Torrio himself would lose patience when O'Banion offered to sell him the valuable Sieben Brewery. On 19 May 1924, while Torrio was inspecting the property, O'Banion arranged for the police to raid the place and arrest Torrio. After his release from custody, Torrio acceded to demands from the Genna crime family, allies of Chicago Outfit, to kill O'Banion.

On 8 November 1924, Mike Merlo died of cancer, and planning for his lavish funeral led to a rush of orders to Schofield's Flower Shop. On Monday, 10 November, O'Banion was arranging bouquets ordered for Merlo's funeral when Frankie Yale, John Scalise, and Albert Anselmi reportedly entered the flower Shop and shot him dead. This was to be the beginning of a five-year gang war between the North Side Gang against Johnny Torrio's Chicago Outfit that would climax with the St. Valentine's Day Massacre in 1929.

=== War with the Chicago Outfit ===
After the death of O'Banion, Hymie Weiss assumed leadership of the North Side Gang and immediately struck back at his rivals. On 12 January, 1925, Weiss, Bugs Moran, and Vincent Drucci attempted to kill Torrio's lieutenant, Al Capone, at a Chicago South Side restaurant. Firing at Capone's car, the men wounded chauffeur Sylvester Barton, but missed Capone entirely. Capone, unnerved by the shooting, ordered his famous armored car to be created. Moran then decided to kidnap one of Capone's trusted bodyguards, torturing him for information before finally executing him and dumping the body.

On 24 January, shortly after the assassination attempt on Capone had taken place, Weiss, Moran, and Drucci ambushed Torrio as he returned from shopping with his wife. Both Torrio and his chauffeur Robert Barton were wounded several times. As Moran was about to kill Torrio, the gun misfired; the gang members were forced to flee the scene as the police arrived. After narrowly surviving this attack, Torrio decided he wanted out. After serving time on bootlegging charges Torrio retired to Italy, passing leadership of the Chicago Outfit to Capone.

Weiss and the North Siders then went after the Genna brothers, leaders of the Genna crime family. First, "Bloody" Angelo Genna was shot to death by Moran after a car chase. Next, Mike "The Devil" Genna was shot down by police when he turned his gun on them after a shootout with the North Siders. Then Drucci killed Samuzzo "Samoots" Amatuna, a Genna family backer. Finally, Antonio "The Gentleman" Genna was murdered (although it was rumored that Capone, not Weiss, ordered this). At this point, the remaining Genna brothers fled Chicago. The North Siders and Capone took the spoils.

=== The North Siders under Weiss, Drucci and Moran ===
Soon after Dean O'Banion's death, the North Siders had formed a "governing council" with Hymie Weiss emerging as leader. Although the loss of O'Banion was a shock to them, the gang was at the height of its power. The Genna family was gone, Torrio had been scared out of the rackets, and Capone was on the defensive. The North Siders expanded their business and strength and plotted another attack on Capone.

In the second North Side attack on Capone, a fleet of North Side cars, with Moran in the lead car, drove to Capone's hotel in Cicero. While Capone and his bodyguard were drinking downstairs, the North Siders drove by the lobby and opened fire with their Thompson submachine guns. Capone and his bodyguard were forced to take cover on the floor. Once the attack was over, Capone sent word to the North Siders that he wanted a truce. A truce was made, which inevitably began to come apart.

Some time later, Capone struck back at the North Siders by gunning down Hymie Weiss and several of his associates. Drucci and Moran now assumed joint leadership of the North Side Gang. The two gangs traded killings and bombings for several more months until a peace conference was held.

Moran and Capone both appeared at the meeting along with many other mob bosses. During the conference, Capone complained that "they were making a shooting gallery of a great business." He also stated that "Chicago should be seen as a pie and each gang gets a slice of the pie." The two gangs agreed to make peace. This peace would last for a while, during which no killings occurred as a result of gang war. Drucci was killed during this time, but it resulted from a brawl with police. Moran now became the sole boss of the North Side Gang.

However, conflict eventually started again. Moran would regularly hijack Capone's beer shipments, aggravating Capone. Capone retaliated by burning down Moran's dog track. A few days later, Capone's own dog track went up in smoke. Moran was the prime suspect.

Open warfare started again between the two gangs. Moran ordered the execution of two union leaders who were powerful allies and personal friends of Capone. This act prompted Capone to order the St. Valentine's Day Massacre.

=== St. Valentine's Day Massacre ===
On 14 February 1929, four unidentified men, two of them dressed as Chicago police officers, entered a North Side Street garage and ordered six members of the North Side Gang and a friend of a gang member to stand against a wall. The gunmen then pulled out machine guns and gunned them all down. The only survivor, Frank "Tight Lips" Gusenberg, died hours later at a nearby Chicago hospital refusing to name his attackers. However, the primary target of the gunmen, Bugs Moran, leader of the North Side Gang, was not at the garage and escaped harm. Strong circumstantial cases can be made for almost a dozen individuals as being one of the gunmen, but it remains unknown to this day exactly who those four gunmen were.

Known as the St. Valentine's Day Massacre, the attack effectively left the five-year gang war between Al Capone and Bugs Moran in a stalemate. The brazenness of this crime resulted in a Federal crackdown on all gang activity in Chicago that eventually led to the downfall of both Moran and Capone.

=== Aftermath ===
Although Bugs Moran survived the St. Valentine's Day Massacre, several experienced North Side gunmen had been lost. The North Side Gang continued to control the 42nd and 43rd Wards and managed to thwart a takeover attempt by Frank McErlane in 1930. As the decade progressed, the power of the North Side Gang slowly declined. In 1936, Jack "Machine Gun" McGurn, alleged mastermind of the massacre, was killed and Moran was one of the prime suspects, along with Frank Nitti of the South Side mob, as McGurn had become more trouble for the South Side Gang than he was worth to protect.

Moran and the North Side Gang eventually lost control of their gambling operations to the new National Crime Syndicate. Since the repeal of Prohibition, gambling had been the main source of North Side income. Bugs Moran eventually left the gang by 1935, after which it quickly dissolved.

== North Side Gang members ==
=== Bosses ===
- 1919–1924 — Dean O'Banion (1892–1924)
- 1924–1926 — Hymie Weiss (1898–1926)
- 1926–1927 — Vincent "The Schemer" Drucci (1898–1927)
- 1927–1935 — George "Bugs" Moran (1893–1957)

=== Other members ===
Name	Portrait	Life	Comments
Jack "Two Gun" Alterie		1886–1935	A leading gunman during Chicago's bootleg wars, Louis Alterie was one of the more colorful figures in the Northsiders. A western enthusiast, Alterie reportedly carried two Colt .45 revolvers on a gun belt and owned a ranch in Colorado that was frequented by other gang members. After publicly challenging O'Banion's killers to a gunfight, the mayor of Chicago publicly slapped Alterie. To cool things off, Alterie left Chicago at the request of Bugs Moran. After several years in exile, Alterie returned to testify against Ralph Capone in 1935. Alterie was murdered soon after his return.
Barney Bertsche	No image available		A later member of the Northsiders, Christian P. "Barney" Bertsche ran prostitution and gambling dens in Chicago's North Side. Following the syndicate takeover of his operations by Capone after the truce agreement at the Hotel Sherman conference in 1926, Bertsche allied with Moran in the hopes of regaining control over his criminal operations.
James Clark	No image available	1887–1929	Born Albert Kachellek in Krojanke, Germany (now Poland), Clark was a bodyguard and brother-in-law of George "Bugs" Moran. One of the seven victims of the St. Valentine's Day Massacre.
John Duffy	No image available	d. 1924	Duffy was hired muscle from Philadelphia who was sometimes used by the North Siders. After murdering his newlywed wife during a drunken argument, he was taken for a "one way ride", allegedly by O'Banion himself, and his body found in a snowbank outside of Chicago.
Frank and Peter Gusenberg	No image available	1893–1929 (Frank); 1888–1929 (Peter)	Peter was the older brother of Frank Gusenberg. Both were top gunmen for the Moran gang. Both died in the St. Valentine's Day Massacre.
Adam Heyer	No image available	1889–1929	Also known under the alias Frank Meyer, Adam Hayes, John Snyder, and Frank Snyder, Heyer was a North Side Mob accountant and business manager. One of the seven victims of the St. Valentine's Day Massacre.
John May	No image available	1893–1929	May is not considered by most researchers to have been a gang member in the conventional sense of the word - he was disassociated with the gang sometimes for months on end, only accepting jobs from them when he desperately needed money (he had a wife and seven children). May was an occasional strongarm for the Moran gang (though it is believed he never carried a gun) but was, most frequently, simply a car mechanic working on a per diem basis. He had the misfortune to be working on a North Side Gang vehicle on Thursday, February 14, and was one of the victims of the massacre.
William "Willie" Marks	No image available		Labor racketeer and a lieutenant under George Moran and, as a bodyguard, was with Moran at the time of the St. Valentine's Day Massacre. Marks, Moran and Ted Newbury avoided the massacre, either by seeing the "police" car pull up to the garage as they approached it themselves, or simply by being a few minutes late.
Dan McCarthy	No image available		A hijacker and "labor slugger" for the North Side Mob, Daniel J. "Dapper Dan" McCarthy was tried and acquitted on three separate murder trials. A "business agent" for Chicago's Journeyman Plumbers' Union he assumed control of the organization by murdering its president Steve Kelleher at Al Tierney's Auto Inn.
Samuel "Nails" Morton	No image available	1894–1923	A veteran of World War I, Samuel Morton was an early lieutenant of Dean O'Banion and served as his right-hand man during the early years of Prohibition. Following Morton's death in a riding accident, several gang members took the offending horse from its stables, led it to a field, and killed it.
Ted Newberry	No image available	d. 1933	Longtime Chicago rumrunner and lieutenant under George Moran during the final years of Prohibition. Defected to the Chicago Outfit following the St. Valentine's Day Massacre. Newberry was later killed by Capone successor Frank Nitti for conspiring to murder Nitti. Newberry's body was found in a roadside ditch in Indiana on January 7, 1933.
Billy Skidmore	No image available	1879–1944	Underworld bail bondsmen and scrap-iron dealer loosely associated with the North Side Gang through his gambling operations and political connections. Convicted of tax evasion in 1941, Skidmore died in prison three years later.
Albert "Gorilla Al" Weinshank	No image available	1893–1929	Weinshank had worked as a speakeasy operator for Moran, and later ran a string of cleaning and dyeing stores for the North Side Gang. His build, choice of clothing, and even vague physical resemblance to Moran is theorized to be the reason that the St. Valentine's Day Massacre began with his arrival at the Clark Street Garage ahead of Moran himself.
Jack Zuta		1888–1930	Originally an accountant and political "fixer" for the Chicago Outfit, he switched sides during the gang war with the Northsiders. He fled Chicago in 1930, after an attempt on his life, but was eventually killed several months later in a roadhouse outside Milwaukee, Wisconsin.
Samuel "Sam" Muscia	No image available	1916–1929	Sam was a prohibition bootlegger and gangster for the North Side Gang, working under the banner of Joe Aiello and George "Bugs" Moran. Sam Muscia had served in the Leavenworth Kansas Penitentiary for counterfeiting bills and in the Wisconsin State Prison for burglary. Sam was shot and killed by Al Capone's rival South Side Gang in retaliation for his involvement in the murders of known South Side affiliates.

== See also ==
- Irish Mob
- Chicago Outfit, primary rivals to the North Side Gang
- Antonio Lombardo, Unione Siciliane leader and Chicago Outfit consigliere
- James M. Ragen, founder of the Ragen's Colts street gang and Chicago gangster.
- Watch Dogs, an open world video game developed by Ubisoft in 2014 which has the North Side Gang surviving and evolving into the Chicago South Club.
