= Dean O'Banion =

American mobster (1892–1924)

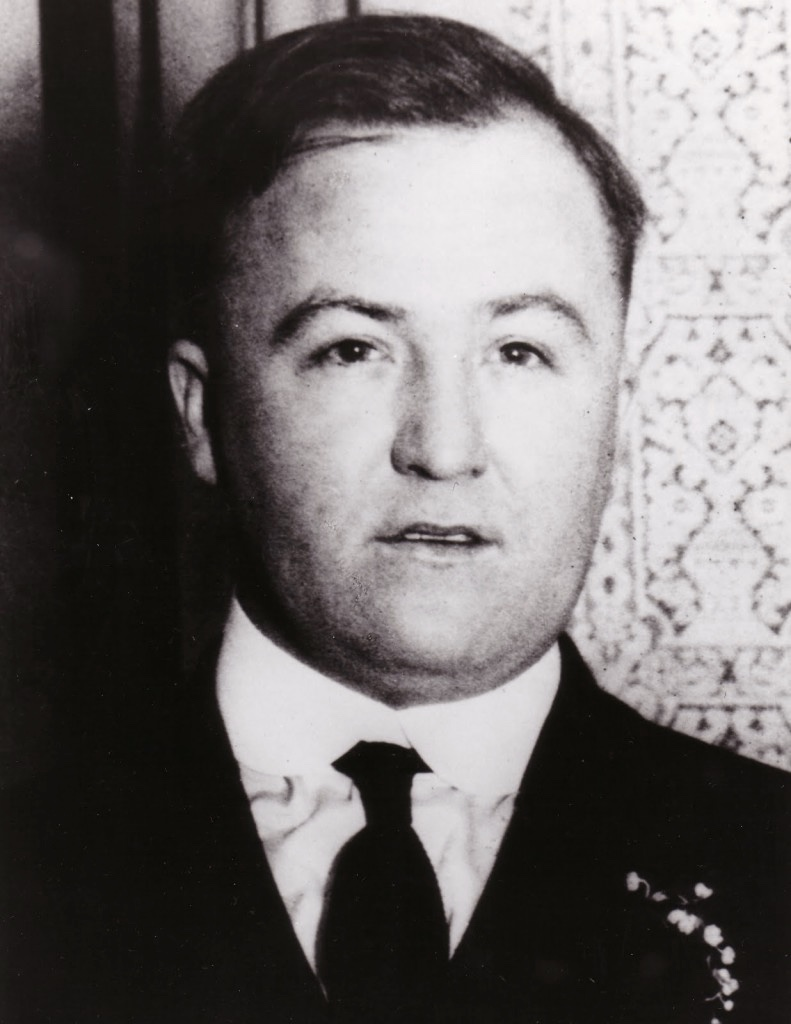
- O'Banion in 1921
- Born: Charles Dean O'Banion; July 8, 1892; Maroa, Illinois, U.S.
- Died: November 10, 1924 (aged 32); Chicago, Illinois, U.S.
- Cause of death: Homicide (gunfire)
- Occupations: Florist, gangster bootlegger, racketeer
- Years active: c. 1910–1924
- Known for: Founder and leader of the North Side Gang during Prohibition

Charles Dean O'Banion (July 8, 1892 – November 10, 1924) was an American mobster who was the main rival of Johnny Torrio and Al Capone during the brutal Chicago bootlegging wars of the 1920s. The newspapers of his day made him better known as Dion O'Banion, although he never went by that first name. He led the North Side Gang until 1924, when he was shot and killed, reportedly by Frankie Yale, John Scalise and Albert Anselmi.

== Early life ==
O'Banion was born to Irish Catholic parents in the small town of Maroa in Central Illinois. In 1901, after his mother's death, he moved to Chicago with his father and older brother (a sister, Ruth, remained in Maroa). The family settled in Kilgubbin, otherwise known as, "Little Hell," a heavily Irish area on the North Side of Chicago that was notorious citywide for its crime.

As a youngster, "Deanie," as he became known, sang in the church choir at Chicago's Holy Name Cathedral. However, neither music nor religion held O'Banion's interest; instead the street life of Kilgubbin caught his eye. An early nickname for O'Banion was "Gimpy" due to his short left leg, but few people had enough nerve to call him that. The shorter leg was the result of a childhood streetcar accident in 1904.

O'Banion and his friends (Earl "Hymie" Weiss, Vincent "The Schemer" Drucci, and George "Bugs" Moran) joined the Market Street Gang, which specialized in theft and robbery for Chicago's black market. The boys later became "sluggers," thugs hired by a newspaper to beat newsstand owners who did not sell the paper. The Market Street Gang started out working for the Chicago Tribune. However, they later switched to the rival Chicago Examiner due to a more attractive offer from newspaper boss Moses Annenberg. Through Annenberg, the gang met safecracker Charles "The Ox" Reiser, who taught them his trade. In 1909, O'Banion was arrested first for safecracking and then for assault. These were the only times O'Banion ever spent in a correctional institution.

O'Banion worked as a waiter at McGovern's Liberty Inn, where each evening he would delight patrons with his beautiful Irish tenor voice as his pals were picking pockets in the coatroom. O'Banion also drugged his patrons' drinks, known then as "slipping them a Mickey Finn." When the drunk patrons left the club, O'Banion and his pals would rob them.

The gang also met the political bosses of the 42nd and 43rd wards through Annenberg; their job was to use violence to help steer the outcome of elections.

== Life as a bootlegger ==
In December 1919, shortly before Prohibition came into effect, O'Banion was walking down Chicago Street when he came across a parked liquor truck. O'Banion took a roll of nickels out of his pocket, approached the driver and knocked him out. O'Banion proceeded to drive off with the liquor. He sold the whiskey in the back to saloon keepers for a total of $15,000 ($235,576 in 2021).

With the onset of Prohibition in 1920, O'Banion started a bootlegging operation. He arranged for beer suppliers in Canada to start shipments immediately, and also struck deals with whiskey and gin distributors. O'Banion pioneered Chicago's first liquor hijacking on December 19, 1921. He and the "lads of Kilgubbin" quickly eliminated all their competition. The O'Banion mob, known as the North Side Gang, now ruled the North Side and the Gold Coast, the wealthy area of Chicago situated on the northern lakefront of Lake Michigan. As O'Banion's name grew in the underworld, he attracted more followers, including Samuel "Nails" Morton, Louis "Two Gun" Alterie, and "Handsome" Dan McCarthy.

At the height of his power, O'Banion was supposedly making about $40 million in 3 years from liquor. During one famous caper, O'Banion and his men stole over $100,000 worth of Canadian whiskey from the West Side railroad yards. In another famous robbery, O'Banion looted the padlocked Sibly Distillery and walked off with 1,750 barrels of bonded whiskey.

In 1921, O'Banion married Viola Kaniff and bought an interest in William Schofield's flower shop in the River North area, near the corner of West Chicago Avenue and North State Street (now a parking lot). He needed a legitimate front for his criminal operations; in addition, he was fond of flowers and was an excellent arranger. Schofield's became the florist of choice for mob funerals. The shop happened to be directly across the street from Holy Name Cathedral, where he and Weiss attended Mass. The rooms above Schofield's were used as the headquarters for the North Side Gang.

== Bootleggers divide Chicago ==
In 1920, "Papa" Johnny Torrio, the head of the predominantly Italian South Side mob (later known as the Chicago Outfit), and his lieutenant, Al Capone, met with all the Chicago bootleggers to work out a system of territories. It was beneficial to everyone to avoid bloody turf battles. In addition, the gangsters were able to pool their political power and their soldiers in the streets. O'Banion accepted the agreement and was given control of the North Side, including the desirable Gold Coast. The North Siders now became part of a huge Chicago area bootlegging combine.

O'Banion lived with Torrio's deal for about three years before becoming dissatisfied with it. Since a recent election in neighboring Cicero, Illinois, the city had become a gold mine for the South Siders and O'Banion wanted a cut of it. To placate him, Torrio granted O'Banion some of Cicero's beer rights and a quarter-interest in a casino called The Ship. The enterprising O'Banion then convinced a number of speakeasies in other Chicago territories to move to his strip in Cicero. This move had the potential to start a bootleg war. Torrio attempted to convince O'Banion to abandon his plan in exchange for some South Side brothel proceeds. O'Banion angrily refused, as he abhorred prostitution.

Meanwhile, the Genna Brothers, who controlled Little Italy west of The Loop (Chicago's downtown region), began marketing their whiskey in the North Side, O'Banion's territory. O'Banion complained about the Gennas to Torrio, but Torrio did nothing. Not one to back down, O'Banion started hijacking Genna liquor shipments. The Gennas sought to murder O'Banion, but Mike Merlo, the president of the Unione Siciliana, had business with O'Banion and prevented the Gennas from resorting to violence against the North Siders.

In January 1924 Davy Miller and his brother Max were shot by O'Banion as they walked out of the play Give and Take at the La Salle Theatre. On their way in they had insulted an acquaintance of O'Banion who shot them in retaliation. Max was shielded by his belt buckle but Davy was seriously injured. He was rushed to hospital where he remained in a critical condition for days before making an eventual recovery. Miller never told the police who had shot him.

== Murder of John Duffy ==
Meanwhile, O'Banion continued on the offensive. In February 1924, he moved against his South Side rivals by unsuccessfully trying to frame Torrio and Capone for the murder of North Side hanger-on John Duffy, a gun for hire from Philadelphia.

Duffy, following a violent drunken argument, had smothered his bride Maybelle Exley with a pillow while she slept (although other sources claim Duffy shot her twice in the head). When he awoke the following morning, he panicked and called a friend, asking for a car and money to get out of town. He was soon contacted by O'Banion, who agreed to help him. He told Duffy to meet him at the Four Deuces, a South Wabash club run by the Torrio-Capone organization.

At the club, several eyewitnesses reported seeing Duffy being picked up around 8:00 pm in a Studebaker by O'Banion and an unidentified man. Duffy's body was later found in a snowbank outside Chicago; he had been shot three times in the head with a .38 caliber pistol. Another witness later told police that he saw O'Banion and two other men dump Duffy's body, but he later retracted his statement.

As Duffy had been last seen at the Four Deuces, suspicion logically focused on club manager Al Capone. The subsequent investigation brought unwanted attention from law enforcement on the club, as it was a source of illegal gambling, prostitution and bootlegging. When police started to view O'Banion as a possible suspect, the gang leader told reporters: "The police don't have to look for me, I'll go and look for them. I'll be at the state's attorney's office at 2:30 PM Monday afternoon ... I can tell the state's attorney anything he wants to know about me. Whatever happened to Duffy is out of my line. I don't mix with that kind of riffraff."

Police officials were never able to gather enough evidence to charge O'Banion with Duffy's murder. They theorized that O'Banion and two accomplices drove Duffy to a remote woodland area. Stopping on Nottingham Road, Duffy and O'Banion got out of the car to relieve themselves. At that point, O'Banion stood behind the unsuspecting Duffy and shot him in the back of the head. O'Banion then shot Duffy twice more before dumping his body in the snowbank. Police think that O'Banion killed Duffy because he wanted to avoid a highly publicized investigation into the murder of Duffy's wife. By meeting Duffy at a Chicago Outfit club and taking Duffy for "a one way ride", he hoped to shift blame for Duffy's murder onto Torrio and Capone.

== Sieben brewery raid ==
The last straw for Torrio was O'Banion's treachery in the Sieben brewery raid. Both O'Banion and Torrio held large stakes in the Sieben brewery in Chicago. In May, 1924, O'Banion learned that the police were planning to raid the brewery on a particular night. Before the raid, O'Banion approached Torrio and told him he wanted to sell his share in the brewery, claiming that the Gennas scared him and he wanted to leave the rackets. Torrio agreed to buy O'Banion's share and gave him half a million dollars. On the night of O'Banion's last shipment, the police swept into the brewery. O'Banion, Torrio, and numerous South Side gangsters were arrested. O'Banion got off easily because, unlike Torrio, he had no previous Prohibition-related arrests. Torrio had to bail out himself and six associates, plus face later court charges with the possibility of jail time. O'Banion also refused to return the money Torrio had given him in the deal.

Torrio soon realized he had been double-crossed. He had lost the brewery and $500,000 in cash ($6.9 Million in 2015 dollars), had been indicted and had been humiliated. Nevertheless, Torrio was willing to overlook this insult in order to maintain peace in the Chicago underworld, until O'Banion himself made the situation irretrievable later that year.

== O'Banion and the Tommy gun ==
During the summer of 1924, O'Banion and his wife Viola took a long vacation at the Colorado dude ranch of his henchman Louis Alterie. On his way back to Chicago, O'Banion purchased a large supply of weapons in Denver, including three Thompson submachine guns, or "baby machine guns", as they were referred to in a local newspaper (At the time, the manufacturer, the Auto-Ordnance Company, was advertising the weapon to ranchers as a means of dealing with animal predators, which clearly brought it to the attention of O'Banion.). O'Banion was murdered soon after his return to Chicago, before he had a chance to use his new Thompsons on any of his enemies.

It is believed that one of O'Banion's machine guns eventually found its way to South Side gunman Frank McErlane, who along with his boss Joe Saltis had formed a secret alliance with the North Side Gang. McErlane used this Thompson in an unsuccessful attempt to kill Spike O'Donnell in September 1925 in what is believed to have been the first recorded use of a "Tommy gun" in Chicago's history.

== Death ==
On November 3, 1924, Dean O'Banion made a telephone call to arch-rival Angelo Genna that became heated. Their disagreement concerned a debt Genna had incurred at The Ship, the casino that the North Side gang boss owned a piece of along with the Chicago Outfit. As O'Banion had sat in with Al Capone, Frank Nitti, Frank Rio, and others to tally the week's profits, it was mentioned that Angelo Genna had bet a large amount of cash, plus a sizable marker. Capone recommended that they cancel the marker as a professional courtesy. O'Banion, instead, spoke to Genna on the telephone and abusively demanded that he pay his debt within a week. With this insult, Angelo Genna and the Genna crime family could no longer be restrained.

Until then, Mike Merlo and the Unione Siciliana had refused to sanction a hit on O'Banion. However, Merlo had terminal cancer and died on November 8, 1924. With Merlo gone, the Gennas and South Siders were free to move on O'Banion.

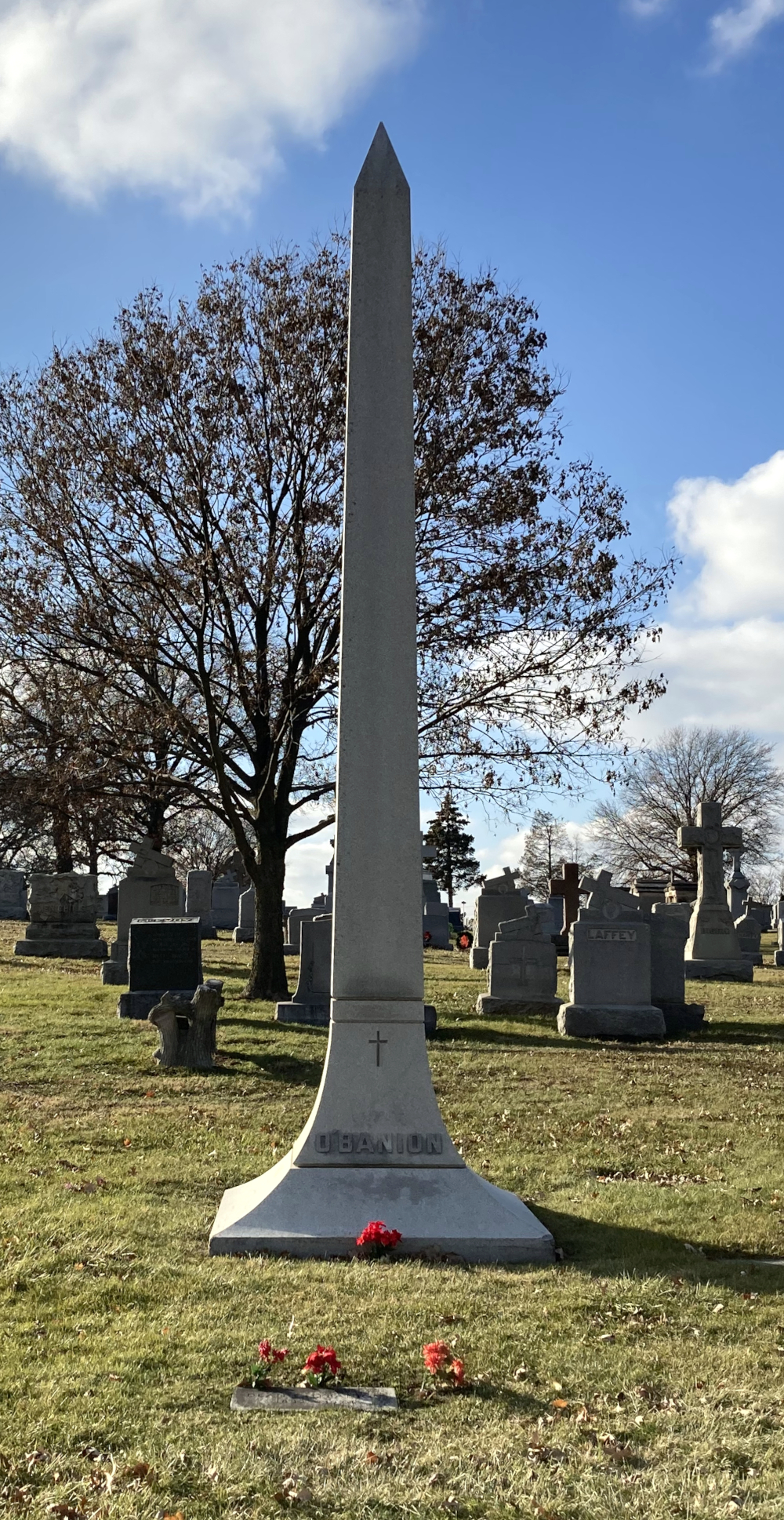
O'Banion's grave at Mount Carmel Cemetery

Using the Merlo funeral as a cover story, over the next few days Brooklyn gangster Frankie Yale and others visited Schofield's, O'Banion's flower shop, to discuss floral arrangements. However, the real purpose of these visits was to memorize the store layout for the hit on O'Banion.

On the morning of November 10, 1924, O'Banion was clipping chrysanthemums in Schofield's' back room. Yale entered the shop with Genna gunmen John Scalise and Albert Anselmi. When O'Banion and Yale shook hands, Yale grasped O'Banion's hand in a tight grip. At the same time, Scalise and Anselmi stepped aside and fired two bullets into O'Banion's chest and two into his throat. One of the killers fired a final shot into the back of his head as he lay face down on the floor.

Since O'Banion was a major organized crime figure, the Archdiocese of Chicago denied him burial in consecrated ground. A priest O'Banion had known since childhood recited the Lord's Prayer and three Hail Marys in his memory. O'Banion received a lavish funeral, much larger than the Merlo funeral the day before. He was buried in Mount Carmel Cemetery in Hillside, Illinois, west of Chicago. O'Banion was originally interred in unconsecrated ground, but his family persevered and he was later reburied in consecrated ground elsewhere in the cemetery.

O'Banion's death placed Hymie Weiss at the head of the North Side Gang, backed by Vincent Drucci and Bugs Moran. Weiss had been a close friend of O'Banion, and the North Siders made it a priority to get revenge on his killers. The ensuing brutal five-year gang war between the North Side Gang and the Chicago Outfit culminated in the killing of seven North Side gang members in the St. Valentine's Day Massacre in 1929.

== In popular culture ==
In the early years of the "Public Enemy" era, Dean O'Banion and other Irish mobsters of the previous decade served as the basis for many gangster films of the 1930s. James Cagney, for example, based his character on O'Banion and his lieutenant Earl "Hymie" Weiss in the 1931 film The Public Enemy. Seasons 3 and 4 of the HBO series Boardwalk Empire featured a version of O'Banion, portrayed by Arron Shiver.

Date	Title	Country	Notes
1959	Al Capone	U.S.	Portrayed by Robert Gist
1967	The St. Valentine's Day Massacre	U.S.	Portrayed by John Agar
1975	Capone	U.S.	Portrayed by John Orchard
1993	The Untouchables Pilot (Parts 1 and 2)	U.S.	Portrayed by Michael Parks
1993	The Young Indiana Jones Chronicles Young Indiana Jones and the Mystery of the Blues	U.S.	Portrayed by Victor Slezak
2012–2013	Boardwalk Empire	U.S.	Portrayed by Arron Shiver
2016	Making of the Mob: Chicago	U.S.	Portrayed by Stephen Lovatt
2017	Gangster Land	U.S.	Portrayed by Mark Rolston

== See also ==
- List of homicides in Illinois § Organized crime

== Footnotes ==
Preceded by N/A	North Side Gang Boss; 1920–1924	Succeeded by Hymie Weiss
