= John Scalise =

American mobster

John Scalise

John Scalise (born Giovanni Scalise, 1900, Castelvetrano, Sicily – May 7, 1929, Chicago) was an American organized crime figure of the early 20th century and, with partner Albert Anselmi, was one of the Chicago Outfit's most successful hitmen in Prohibition-era Chicago.

== Prohibition and the Bootleg Wars ==
Shortly after he began working for the Gennas, Scalise met Albert Anselmi, who became his mentor and best friend. Both men remain, to this day, the prime suspects in the November 1924 murder of Dean O'Banion, boss of Chicago's North Side Gang.

Soon after O'Banion's murder, Scalise and Anselmi secretly defected from the Gennas to Al Capone's Chicago Outfit. On June 13, 1925, Anselmi and Scalise, along with Mike Genna, ambushed North Siders George "Bugs" Moran and Vincent "The Schemer" Drucci in The Patch, shooting up their car with shotguns and wounding Drucci. About an hour later, as the shooters raced south on Western Avenue, they were sighted and pursued by a detective squad. After a high-speed chase, the gangsters were overtaken at the corner of Western and 60th Street. Immediately after the cars screeched to a stop, the gangsters jumped out and opened fire with their shotguns. During the ensuing gun battle, Chicago Police officers Harold Olsen and Charles Walsh were killed and Michael Conway severely wounded. The fourth officer, William Sweeney, pursued the fleeing Anselmi, Scalise, and Genna towards the next block of houses. Genna was fatally shot by Sweeney while the other two were captured after boarding a nearby streetcar. It was later said that when they were initially spotted by the detectives, Scalise and Anselmi were speeding south towards Chicago city limits in order to discreetly murder Mike Genna, who had allegedly been marked for death by the pair's secret employer, Al Capone.

Anselmi and Scalise were bound over for trial. Prosecutor Bob Crowe vowed to send both men to the gallows. The two killers’ lawyers managed to convince the jury that they had reacted against "unwarranted police aggression." Anselmi and Scalise were found guilty of the manslaughter of Officer Walsh and were sentenced to 14 years in prison.

In the time between their trials, the two men and their cohorts sent "collectors" around The Patch to raise money for their defense fund. Men like Henry Spignola and Antonio Morici were murdered. The main "collector", a fearsome mobster named Orazio "The Scourge" Tropea, was discovered to be keeping most of the collections for himself. Tropea was shotgunned to death on Halsted Street on February 15, 1926. Other deaths followed before Scalise and Anselmi were both acquitted of the murder of Patrolman Harold Olsen.

Back in Joliet Prison, both Scalise and Anselmi had difficulty adjusting to prison life. Both men were frequently beaten and Scalise was nearly poisoned on one occasion. Nevertheless, the two still played a part in Chicago gangland affairs. The war between Capone and the North Side Gang, now under Earl "Hymie" Weiss, reached a peak in the fall of 1926. During a peace conference, Weiss offered peace to Capone if the O'Banion killers, Scalise and Anselmi, were killed. Capone refused and had Weiss murdered less than two weeks later.

In December 1926, both Scalise and Anselmi were granted a retrial in the Walsh killing and in January were released from prison. In June 1927, the two men were acquitted. Capone threw them a grand party, climaxed by a shoot-out with champagne-bottle corks.

== Saint Valentine's Day Massacre ==
Both John Scalise and Albert Anselmi were arrested and charged in the Saint Valentine's Day Massacre case. At the pair's arraignment on March 8, 1929, their attorney Thomas Nash asked the arresting officer, Sergeant Fred Valenta, if he had "just and reasonable grounds" for believing Scalise and Anselmi committed the massacre. Sergeant Valenta replied, "No." The two gangsters were then released due to a lack of evidence. Around this time, Scalise had been elevated to vice-president of the Unione Siciliana by new president Joseph "Hop Toad" Giunta, who had taken over following the murder of its former president, Pasqualino Lolordo.

== Final days ==
In the early morning hours of May 8, 1929, the bodies of Scalise, Anselmi, and Giunta were discovered on a lonely road near Hammond, Indiana. All three had been severely beaten and shot to death. One of Scalise’s gunshot wounds had torn off the pinky finger of his left hand. The coroner said that he had never seen such disfigured bodies. It was initially suspected that the North Side Gang had killed the trio in retaliation for the St. Valentine's Day Massacre. However, this theory was discounted a few days later when informants stated that the three men were lured to a banquet with their Sicilian friends and, while trying to break up a quarrel that was being staged for their benefit, were themselves attacked and killed. Scalise’s body was shipped back to Castelvetrano, Sicily, for burial.

Years later, a more popular story emerged that Al Capone had discovered that Scalise, Anselmi, and Giunta were conspiring with rival mobster Joe Aiello to betray him. Capone bodyguard Frankie Rio was credited with uncovering the plan, which his boss initially refused to believe. During a charade concocted for their benefit, Capone staged an argument with Rio in front of Scalise and Anselmi and then slapped his bodyguard, who ran from the room. Both killers tracked Frankie Rio down and offered to bring him in on their plans with Giunta and Aiello. After confirmation of the treachery, an elaborate ruse was developed to get rid of the plotters. At the climax of a dinner thrown in their honor, Capone produced a baseball bat and beat the three men nearly to death, before two or three gunmen stepped in to finish the job.

== Descendants ==
John Scalise was said to be the uncle of Chicago Outfit mobster Joseph Jerome "Jerry" Scalise, who served under Albert Tocco.
