= Hawthorne Smoke Shop =

Gambling casino in Cicero, Illinois, US

Coordinates: 41°51′4.0″N 87°44′45.1″W

The Hawthorne Smoke Shop (later known as the Ship) was a gambling casino owned by American gangster Al Capone and run by fellow gangsters Frankie Pope, manager of horse racing at the Hawthorne, and Pete Penovich Jr., manager of games of chance. It was located in Cicero, Illinois, where Capone had fled to escape Chicago police. Although shut down temporarily by raids several times during its existence, it provided a significant amount of revenue, earning half a million dollars in a two-year period. Leslie Shumway, a cashier who worked there, testified in court that horse betting, roulette, craps, blackjack, and birdcage (chuck-a-luck) all took place there. The profits from the Hawthorne Smoke Shop were one piece of evidence used against Capone at his trial in 1931.

== Location ==
The Hawthorne Smoke Shop, subsequently known as 'The Ship' and 'The Subway', was first operated on May 1, 1924, from the Western Hotel at 4837 West 22nd Street. It was later operated from: 4818, 4838, 4835 and 4738 West 22nd Street, Cicero, Illinois.
