= Mike Merlo =

American political and organized crime figure

Michele Merlo
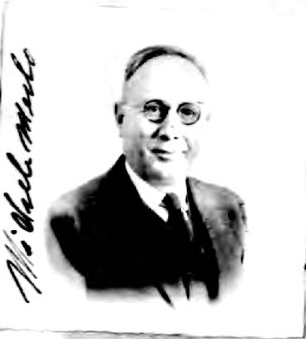
- Merlo in a 1921 passport application
- Born: January 4, 1880; Sambuca, Sicily, Italy
- Died: November 8, 1924 (aged 44); Chicago, Illinois, U.S.
- Other name: Mike Merlo
- Known for: Chicago labor leader whose death precipitated the city's infamous 1920s gangster war
- Political party: Democratic

Michele "Mike" Merlo (January 4, 1880 – November 9, 1924) was a Chicago political figure and "fixer" associated in his later years with the Torrio-Capone organization. As head of the Unione Siciliana fraternal group, Merlo wielded considerable influence both in Chicago's Democratic Party politics and also within Chicago's criminal underworld during the early years of Prohibition. Although Merlo was able to maintain peace among the city's numerous bootlegging gangs, his death marked the beginning of Chicago's bootleg wars that plagued the city for the rest of the decade.

== Biography ==
Born Michele Merlo to Calogero and Maria Merlo in Sambuca Zabut, Sicily, at the age of nine Merlo immigrated with his family from Palermo to New Orleans and, then, in 1900, to Chicago. In 1902, Merlo's father died of a stroke at the age of 52, leaving the 22-year-old Merlo and his sick mother to fend for themselves. Merlo later became involved in the Chicago chapter of Unione Siciliana, a national organization dedicated to assisting Sicilian immigrants in America. Although Merlo later transformed the Unione into a front for organized crime, he reportedly did have a genuine concern for the welfare of the Sicilian residents of Chicago's Little Italy.

With the passage of Prohibition and the rise of bootlegging in Chicago, Merlo used his position to mediate the frequent territorial disputes between the Chicago bootlegging gangs. These gangs included the predominantly Irish North Side Gang, under boss Dion O'Banion, the Sicilian Genna Brothers gang and the South Side gang, then run by Torrio and Capone. During the early years of Prohibition, Merlo was able to maintain an uneasy peace between these three gangs and the other criminal organizations.

Merlo died of cancer on November 9, 1924. He received one of the most spectacular funerals in Chicago mob history, with $100,000 in floral arrangements and a $5,000 life-size wax statue. Merlo's burial was attended by an estimated 10,000 mourners and curious (including Mayor William E. Dever, State Attorney Robert E. Crowe, Chicago Police Chief Morgan A. Collins and the Cook County Board President and future Mayor, Anton J. Cermak, who all served as pallbearers) as Merlo was buried at St Clement's Church five days later. Merlo's body was later reinterred at Mount Carmel Cemetery, in Hillside, Illinois, in a mausoleum bearing the name, "Michele Merlo."

Two days after Merlo's death, the Chicago gangs broke into open warfare. Torrio men John Scalise and Albert Anselmi arrived at O'Banion's Chicago flower shop on the pretense of picking up flowers for Merlo's funeral and murdered O'Banion. The North Side gang then launched a series of bloody counterstrikes against the Gennas and the South Side gang. This gang war continued until the victory of the South Side Gang (now the Chicago Outfit) at the St Valentine's Day Massacre, in 1929.

Merlo's son, John Merlo (1912–1992), became an alderman of Chicago's 44th Ward and served eight terms in both the Illinois House of Representatives and Illinois Senate. A Lakeview branch of the Chicago Public Library was renamed in John Merlo's honor.

== In popular culture ==
In the 1987 film The Untouchables, Mike Merlo was portrayed by actor Vince Viverito.

Preceded by Anthony D'Andrea (c1914-1921)	Chicago Mafia Boss; 1921-1924	Succeeded by Angelo Genna (1924-1925)
