= Italian-American National Union =

Sicilian-American organization

The Italian-American National Union (formerly known as Unione Siciliana) was a Sicilian-American organization, which controlled much of the Italian vote within the United States during the early twentieth century. It was based in Chicago, Illinois. It was a major source of conflict during Prohibition, as underworld figures fought to control the highly influential organization through a series of puppet presidents largely controlled by the Chicago Outfit. During the 1970s, the organization was probably merged into the Italian Sons and Daughters of America. However, similar groups still exist and have much influence in Italian American communities throughout the United States.

== History ==
The organization was founded in 1895 by Sicilian immigrants in Chicago. The name was changed to the Italian-American National Union in 1925 in order to attract Italian-Americans from other regions. The Union was paying out sick benefits and death benefits and had deposited $100,000 with the Illinois Department of Insurance. It was restructured as a fraternal life insurance group in 1937.

The Union was absorbed by the Italian Sons and Daughters of America Fraternal Association in 1991.

== Organization and activities ==
Lodges were called "Subordinate Lodges" and the highest authority was the "Supreme Council", according to the 1930 constitution which was apparently still in force as late as 1979. In 1928 there was also a board of directors. There was Juvenile Department in the 1920s that organized basketball and football teams, among other sporting activities. The Juvenile Department wasn't mentioned in a late 1970s report on the organization, though its fraternal activities included athletic events for youth, as well as marching in Columbus Day parades, providing aid to handicapped children, scholarships for youth and maintaining an Italian Old People's Home.

== Membership ==
According to the 1930 constitution membership was open to "white men of Italian origin", who believed in a Supreme Being, were of good moral character, of sound health and competent to make a living. Membership was decided by blackball.

The Union had 39 lodges with 4,000 adult members and over 1,000 in the Juvenile Department. The Union had 40 lodges in 1972 and 31 in 1977, all located in Illinois and Indiana. Membership in 1979 was 5,000. In 1994 it was reported to have 5,000 members in 34 locals.

== Rituals ==
Rituals included private words, tokens, signs, grips and passwords, which were all supposed to be secret. Members of the society were issued annual passwords, and the Supreme President issued a quadrennial password to members of the Supreme Council.

== Corruption of the Unione ==
In the early 1900s, the Unione took part in efforts to fight the Black Hand in Chicago. It failed in this endeavor. Later, the presidency of the Unione became a target for political power brokers. Antonio D'Andrea was the Chicago Mafia boss at that time. He was an ex-priest who was arrested for counterfeiting in 1902. With the assistance of his family and supporters, he was released from prison after a short time. He worked as a professional translator and later as a court translator. In 1916, he ran for political office, but his criminal past was exposed, which he had kept hidden. To gain additional strength from the local Italian power base, he ran and was elected president of the Chicago chapter of the Unione in or around 1919. In 1921, he ran against John Powers, who ended up with more Italian support than D'Andrea. There were numerous bombings and killings from followers of both men, and D'Andrea dropped out of the race. Nevertheless, he was shot and mortally wounded in May, 1921.

Michele Merlo was a leader in D'Andrea's Mafia organization who went by the name of Mike Merlo. He had been vacationing in Italy, but he made an emergency return upon hearing of D'Andrea's death. According to Nicola Gentile, he ordered the death of D'Andrea's assassin. For this act, he took control of the Chicago Mafia, and replaced D'Andrea as president of the Unione, as well. His brief term was regarded as a successful one, and he was noted to have kept the criminal organizations of John Torrio and Dean O'Banion from warring with each other.

Merlo died of cancer in 1924, and the chapter organization split into several factions (later renamed the "Italo-American National Union"), as various underworld groups struggled for control of the organization. Of these factions, "Bloody" Angelo Genna claimed the presidency following Merlo's death; however, he was murdered the following year by members of the North Side Gang. Genna's successor Samuzzo "Samoots" Amatuna was killed in a barbershop that same year, allegedly by Northsider Vincent "The Schemer" Drucci.

A common assumption that Al Capone had amassed enough power in Chicago to place Antonio Lombardo as head of the Unione Siciliane", but Lombardo was thought to have been chosen by outside Mafia leaders for his abilities as a peacemaker. Lombardo was from eastern Sicily, but he agreed with Supreme President Bernard Barasa to change the name to the Italo-American National Union to increase awareness that the association was not only for Sicilians. Lombardo held considerable influence in Italian-American communities, including acting as a negotiator between Black Hand kidnappers and victim's families. It is traditionally assumed that he was supported by Capone, but many members of the organization opposed his reforms. A faction challenged Lombardo, under the leadership of Capone rival Joe [Aiello], calling for his withdrawal from office. Lombardo's refusal resulted in his death on September 7, 1928. According to Nick Gentile, however, Aiello was Lombardo's underboss and Capone was given permission by Joseph Masseria (a boss of one of New York's Five Families and soon a "Boss of Bosses") to eliminate both Aiello and Lombardo. Gentile thought that Capone was responsible for Lombardo's death.

Pasqualino "Patsy" Lolordo assumed the presidency for around four months until his own murder by Joe Aiello at his home on January 8, 1929. Aiello claimed the presidency the next day and reportedly held the office for a year and a half until his death by a Chicago Outfit gunman on October 23, 1930. In fact, he may never have held office.

== Recent history ==
The association continued with corrupt influence in its leadership for many years. Phil D'Andrea, a nephew of Antonio D'Andrea, served as supreme president, while active in the former Capone organization led by Frank Nitti. Attorney Joseph Bulger led the association for several years. He was born Giuseppe Imburgio and was close to Tony Accardo. He was killed in a plane accident in 1966. State investigators rooted out its corrupt influences in the 1950s, and its membership declined through the 1970s. The Unione eventually merged with the Italian Sons and Daughters of America.

== Presidents ==
=== Chicago ===
- 1919–1921 – Anthony D'Andrea – murdered on May 11, 1921.
- 1921–1924 – Michele "Mike" Merlo – died of cancer on November 8, 1924
- 1924–1925 – Angelo "Bloody Angelo" Genna – murdered on May 27, 1925.
- 1925 – Samuel "Samoots" Amatuna – murdered on November 13, 1925.
- 1925–1928 – Antonio "Tony the Scourge" Lombardo – murdered on September 7, 1928.
- 1928–1929 – Pasqualino "Patsy" Lolordo – murdered on January 8, 1929.
- 1929 – Giuseppe "Hop Toad" Guinta – murdered on May 7, 1929.
- 1929–1930 – Giuseppe "Joe" Aiello – murdered on October 23, 1930.
- 1930–1934 – Agostino Loverdo – removed in 1934.
- 1934–1941 – Filippo "Phil" D'Andrea
