= Bugs Moran =

American criminal (1893–1957)

George "Bugs" Moran
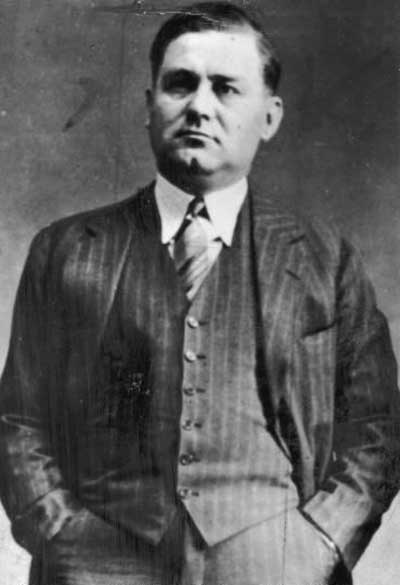
- Moran, c. 1930
- Born: Adelard Leo Cunin; August 21, 1893; Saint Paul, Minnesota, U.S.
- Died: February 25, 1957 (aged 63); USP Leavenworth, Leavenworth, Kansas, U.S.
- Resting place: Leavenworth Federal Penitentiary Cemetery, U.S.
- Other names: George Gage, George Morrissey, George Miller
- Occupations: Gangster, bootlegger
- Predecessor: Vincent Drucci
- Spouse(s): Evelyn Herrell (first wife) Lucille Logan Bilezikdijan (m. 1922)
- Children: 1
- Allegiance: North Side Gang
- Criminal charges: Robbery and conspiracy to counterfeit checks and cash in $62,000 worth of American Express checks
- Penalty: 10–20 years at Ohio Penitentiary; 5 years at Leavenworth Prison

George Clarence "Bugs" Moran (/məˈrɑːn/; born Adelard Leo Cunin; August 21, 1893 – February 25, 1957) was an American Chicago Prohibition-era gangster. He was incarcerated three times before his 21st birthday. Seven members of his gang were gunned down and killed in a warehouse in the Saint Valentine's Day Massacre of February 14, 1929, supposedly on the orders of his rival Al Capone.

== Early life and career ==
Moran was born Adelard Cunin to a French immigrant father, Jules Adelard Cunin, and a mother of Canadian descent, Marie Diana Gobeil, in Saint Paul, Minnesota. He attended Cretin High School, a private Catholic school in Saint Paul, but he also joined a local juvenile gang and left school at age 18. He was later caught robbing a store and was sent to the state juvenile correctional facility, and was put in jail three times before he turned 21. He then fled to Chicago where he was caught trying to rob a warehouse, taking part in a horse-stealing ring, taking part in robbery involving the death of a police officer, and robbing a freight car, for which he received a variety of prison and jail sentences. That is when young Adelard Cunin first adopted the name George Moran; it was the first name he thought of when police asked him who he was. George Moran was a violent and unstable man who got the nickname "Bugs" because everyone thought he was nuts or "buggy".

== Prohibition ==
Prohibition was established in 1920 with the enactment of the 18th Amendment, which banned the distribution of alcoholic beverages, resulting in bootlegging. Among the involved gangs were Dean O'Banion and his mostly Irish group, including Bugs Moran, who became known as the North Side Gang and Al Capone as the leader of the Italian mob on the South Side. These two rivals fought violently, resulting in what is known as "The Bootleg Battle of the Marne".

== Battling Al Capone ==
The bootlegging operation of Hymie Weiss and Bugs Moran continued to pose a significant challenge to Capone's South Side Gang. Moran and Capone then fought a turf war with each other that cost them both. Moran's hatred of Capone was apparent even to the public. Moran was disgusted that Capone engaged in prostitution. He would not engage in prostitution rings because of his Catholic religion. Johnny Torrio's gang killed Dean O'Banion, and in an attempt to avenge him, Bugs Moran and Earl "Hymie" Weiss made an attempt on Torrio's life. Later they went on to make a failed attempt on Al Capone's life at his headquarters, the Hawthorne Inn in Cicero, Illinois. More than one thousand shots were fired at the inn and at a nearby restaurant in their attempts to kill Capone. In retaliation, Weiss was killed by Capone's gang, and Moran became the new boss of the North Side Gang.

According to Paul Maccabee, a historian of Twin Cities organized crime, Bugs Moran had a close friendship with St. Paul–based Irish mob boss Danny Hogan. Following Hogan's murder by car bomb on December 4, 1928, Bugs Moran personally stood guard outside the Hogan family residence at West Seventh Street in St. Paul, "apparently to protect the Hogan family from further underworld attacks."

Responding to Weiss's death, Moran tried to kill a member of Capone's gang, resulting in an attack, allegedly by Capone, known as the St. Valentine's Day Massacre.

== The St. Valentine's Day Massacre ==
On February 14, 1929, seven members of Moran's gang died in what came to be called the Saint Valentine's Day Massacre. Moran was offered a truckload of whiskey at a bargain price, which he had ordered to be delivered at 10:30 a.m. to the garage of the S.M.C. Cartage Company on North Clark Street, where he kept his bootlegging trucks.

Two gunmen—dressed as Chicago police officers and two others in plain clothes—lined up Moran's people (and two men who were not gang members and just happened to be there by chance) against the wall in the warehouse and shot them. Bugs Moran, the main target of the assassination, was not present, arriving late; when he saw the approaching police car, he turned around going to a nearby café instead. Another North Sider, Al Weinshank, was misidentified as Moran by one of the lookouts who signaled for the attack to begin.

Police response was delayed when witnesses saw the two "police officers" exit the scene. There were six corpses and another man near death when police arrived on the scene. The survivor, Frank Gusenberg, following the gangsters' code of silence, refused to identify the killers before dying. When Moran learned of the carnage, he broke the gangster code, accusing Capone of the murders. No one was convicted. Capone was in Florida on the day of the massacre. He denied involvement in the massacre, though he was twice summoned to court, which he avoided by claimed illness.

There is some evidence implicating Chicago police officers in the killings. Prior to the massacre, some officers were stealing bootleg liquor from the gang's trucks and were allegedly disciplined by the chief of police, but no substantiation is available.

== After Prohibition ==
Moran managed to keep control of his territory and what remained of his gang through the early 1930s, but the North Side gang never fully recovered its power or former place in Chicago's underworld as the chief rival to Capone's Italian mob. Moran eventually left the area, quitting the gang entirely—though not the criminal lifestyle. He reverted to committing petty crimes, such as mail fraud and robbery.

On April 30, 1939, Moran was convicted of conspiracy to cash $62,000 worth of American Express checks. He was freed on appeal when he posted a bond; he fled but was captured and not released until December 21, 1944. He was almost penniless by the 1940s, only 17 years after being one of the richest gangsters in Chicago. On July 6, 1946, he was arrested for his involvement in the robbery of a Dayton, Ohio, tavern on June 28, 1945, and received a sentence of 20 years. He was paroled in 1956, but was immediately arrested for his role in the 1945 robbery of a bank in Ansonia, Ohio. He was found guilty in 1957 and sentenced to 10 more years in prison.

== Death in prison ==
Moran died of lung cancer a few months into his 10-year sentence at Leavenworth Federal Prison in Kansas on February 25, 1957, at the age of 63.

== Personal life ==
Moran married Lucille Logan Bilezikdian, with whom he had a son, John George Moran. She left him because of his criminal lifestyle. In 1942, he married Evelyn Herrell, who remained his legal wife until his death.

== In popular culture ==
Date	Title	Country	Notes	IMDb
1958	Playhouse 90 Seven Against the Wall	US	Portrayed by Dennis Patrick	
1959	Al Capone	US	Portrayed by Murvyn Vye	
1959	The Untouchables – The George "Bugs" Moran Story, Arsenal, The Eddie O'Gara Story, and Doublecross	US	Portrayed by Lloyd Nolan, Robert J. Wilke, and Harry Morgan	
1967	The St. Valentine's Day Massacre	US	Portrayed by Ralph Meeker	
1975	Capone	US	Portrayed by Robert Phillips	
1987	The Verne Miller Story	US	Portrayed by Sean Moran	
1993	The Untouchables – Pilot (Parts 1 and 2), Chinatown	US	Portrayed by Jack Thibeau	
2000	Early Edition – Everybody Goes to Rick's	US	Portrayed by Kevin Fry	
2017	Gangster Land	US	Portrayed by Peter Facinelli	

== Sources ==
- Bugs Moran at Encyclopædia Britannica
- George "Bugs" Moran, head-and-shoulders portrait, facing left. 1957. New York World-Telegram and the Sun Newspaper Photograph Collection, whereabouts unknown. Accessed 22 Mar. 2015. https://www.loc.gov/pictures/item/95511458/
- George "Bugs" Moran, head-and-shoulders portrait, facing front. 1930. Library of Congress, whereabouts unknown. Accessed 22 Mar. 2015. https://www.loc.gov/pictures/item/93511625/
- "FEB 14 1929: The St Valentine's Day Massacre in Chicago". History Today 59, no. 2 (February 2009): 10. Corporate ResourceNet, Accessed March 23, 2015. EBSCOhost.

Salem Press. American Villains. Pasadena, Calif: Salem Press, 2008. 386–389. Accessed March 22, 2015. EBSCOhost.

Preceded by Vincent Drucci	North Side Gang Boss; 1927–1935?	Succeeded by N/A
