= Hymie Weiss =

Polish-American mob boss (1898–1926)

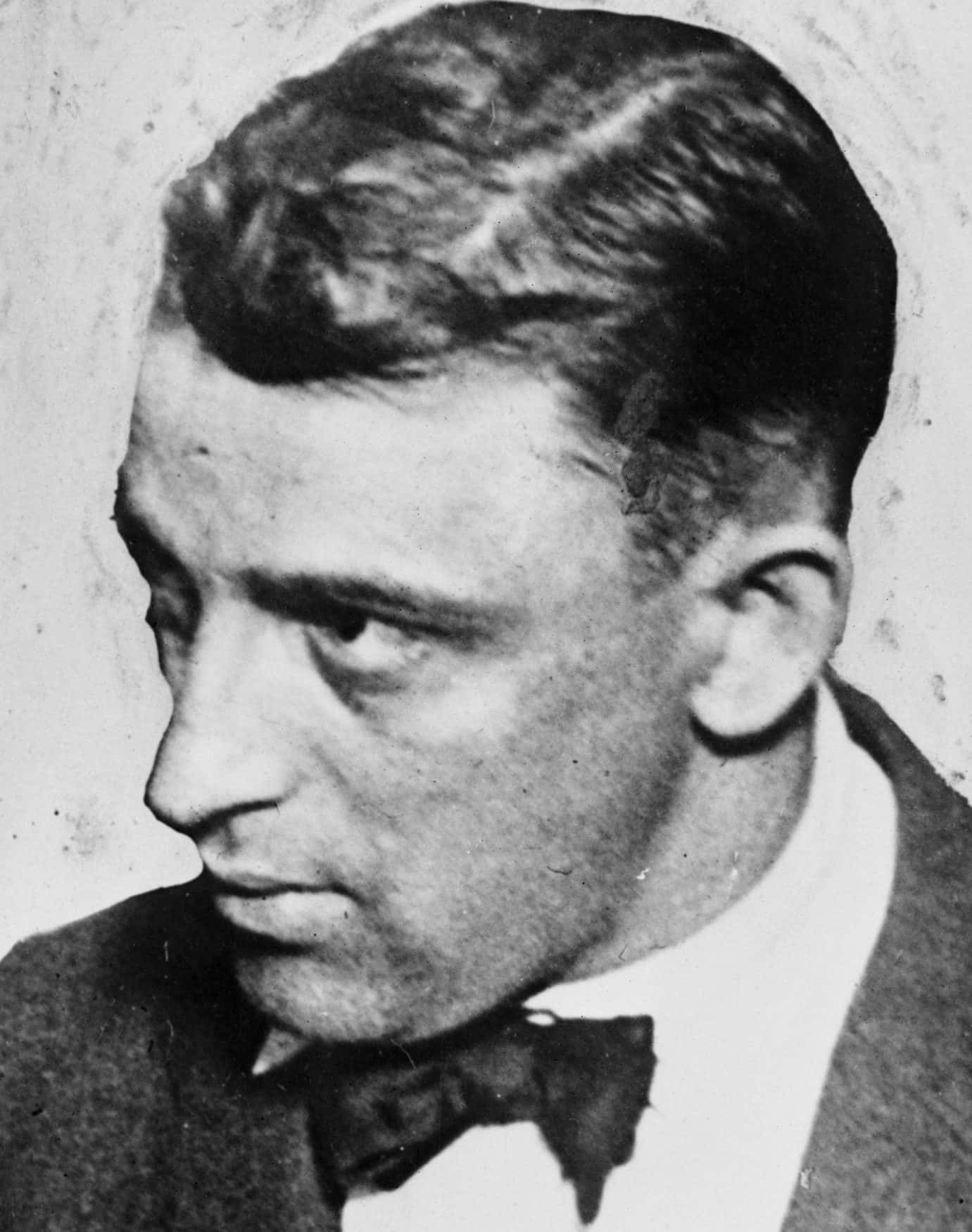
- 1929 photo of Weiss from the Chicago Tribune
- Born: Henryk Wojciechowski; January 25, 1898; Sieradz, Congress Poland, Russian Empire
- Died: October 11, 1926 (aged 28); Chicago, Illinois, U.S.
- Cause of death: Gunshots
- Resting place: Mount Carmel Cemetery, Hillside, Illinois, U.S.
- Other names: Earl J. Weiss, Hymie the Pole, Hymie the Polack, Little Hymie
- Occupation: Crime boss
- Years active: 1924–1926
- Predecessor: Dean O'Banion
- Successor: Vincent Drucci
- Opponent: Al Capone
- Allegiance: North Side Gang
- Accomplice: Josephine Simard

Earl J. "Hymie" Weiss (born Henryk Wojciechowski; January 25, 1898 – October 11, 1926), was a Polish-American mob boss who became a leader of the Prohibition-era North Side Gang and a bitter rival of Al Capone. He was known as "the only man Al Capone feared".

== Early years ==
Henryk Wojciechowski was born in Sieradz, Congress Poland, to Walenty S. Wojciechowski and Maria Bruszkiewicz. His parents emigrated to the United States in 1901 when Henryk was three years old and, upon their arrival in the new country, took the names of William and Mary Weiss. They settled in Buffalo, New York, and later moved to an Irish district in the north of Chicago. He had four siblings who survived infancy: Bernard (Bruno), Frederick, Violet and Joseph. Two others died during infancy.

As a teenager, Weiss became a petty criminal. After he upset a fragrance shelf during a botched burglary as a youth, police dubbed him "The Perfume Burglar". He befriended the Irish-American Dean O'Banion. With Weiss and George "Bugs" Moran, O'Banion established the North Side Gang. Around that time Henryk started to use the name Earl, a name bestowing the prestige of British earldom onto its holder. The criminal organization they founded eventually controlled bootlegging and other illicit activities in the northern part of Chicago. He was nicknamed "Hymie" and "Hymie the Pole", later in his career. Despite the Jewish-sounding surname, he was Polish Roman Catholic. Besides his gun, he always carried a rosary. Weiss was known to be against prostitution, fueling his scorn of the city's south side vice cartels.

Weiss is credited with the first known use of the organized crime practice of the "one way ride", referring to a planned murder where the victim is lured or coerced into driving with their killers and is killed either en route to or upon arrival at a destination. Weiss was seen driving off with Steve Wisniewski, a local criminal who had recently hijacked a Northside beer shipment, in July 1921.

== Personality ==
When Weiss' brother Fred was questioned about him in 1926, he replied, "I've seen him once in twenty years... that was when he shot me, six years ago". When photographers tried to snap his picture, Weiss would glare at them and say in a low voice, "You take a picture of me and I'll kill you".

On one occasion, Weiss chased away at gunpoint a deputy U.S. Marshal who came to arrest a friend for violation of the Mann Act at a party he was attending. The marshal returned with reinforcements, arrested the friend, and confiscated a cache of alcohol and weapons. After the raid, Weiss filed a lawsuit to recover silk shirts, underwear, and socks that he claimed the marshals had stolen; neither the government's charges nor the lawsuit came to anything.

Chicago journalist James O'Donnell Bennett is reputed to have called Weiss "the brainiest leader that North Side boozedom ever had".

== North Side Gang leader ==
Dean O'Banion was killed at his headquarters flower shop on November 10, 1924. Weiss succeeded his friend as North Side gang leader and embarked on a campaign of revenge against the Torrio-Capone Gang and the Genna Brothers. Weiss was terminally ill with cancer, which made him heedless of his own safety when conducting bold attacks on Torrio's gang.

In January 1925, the North Siders shot up Al Capone's car on 55th and State St., missing Capone but wounding members of his entourage. Later that month, Weiss, Moran, and Drucci ambushed Torrio outside his southside home. Torrio was shot several times and left for dead. Torrio survived and recovered in a local hospital. Shortly after this incident, Torrio relinquished control of his gang to Al Capone. After Torrio's flight to New York City, Chicago broke out into a city-wide gang war. Weiss allied his North Side Gang with the Westside O'Donnells, the Saltis-McErlane mob, and the Guilfoyle-Kolb-Winge (GKW) gang.

In August 1926, Weiss and Drucci (with their entourage) were attacked by a contingent of Capone gunmen, including Paul Ricca, who was arrested at the scene. The gun battle took place on South Michigan Avenue, near the Standard Oil Building. The North Side Gang leaders survived the attack, reportedly due in large part to Drucci's personal efforts in driving off the assailants.

Weiss retaliated against Capone on September 20, 1926. A procession of ten vehicles unloaded gunfire into Capone's Hawthorne Hotel, on 22nd St. in Cicero. Over 1000 rounds were fired. Police at the time believed Weiss, Drucci, Moran, the Gusenburg brothers, and other North Siders were the gunmen in the attack. Capone was on the premises at the time of the shooting, but was able to flee out of the back of the building during the ambush. Paul Ricca, who was wounded in this attack, reportedly warned Capone and others as the North Side convoy came down the street.

== Death ==
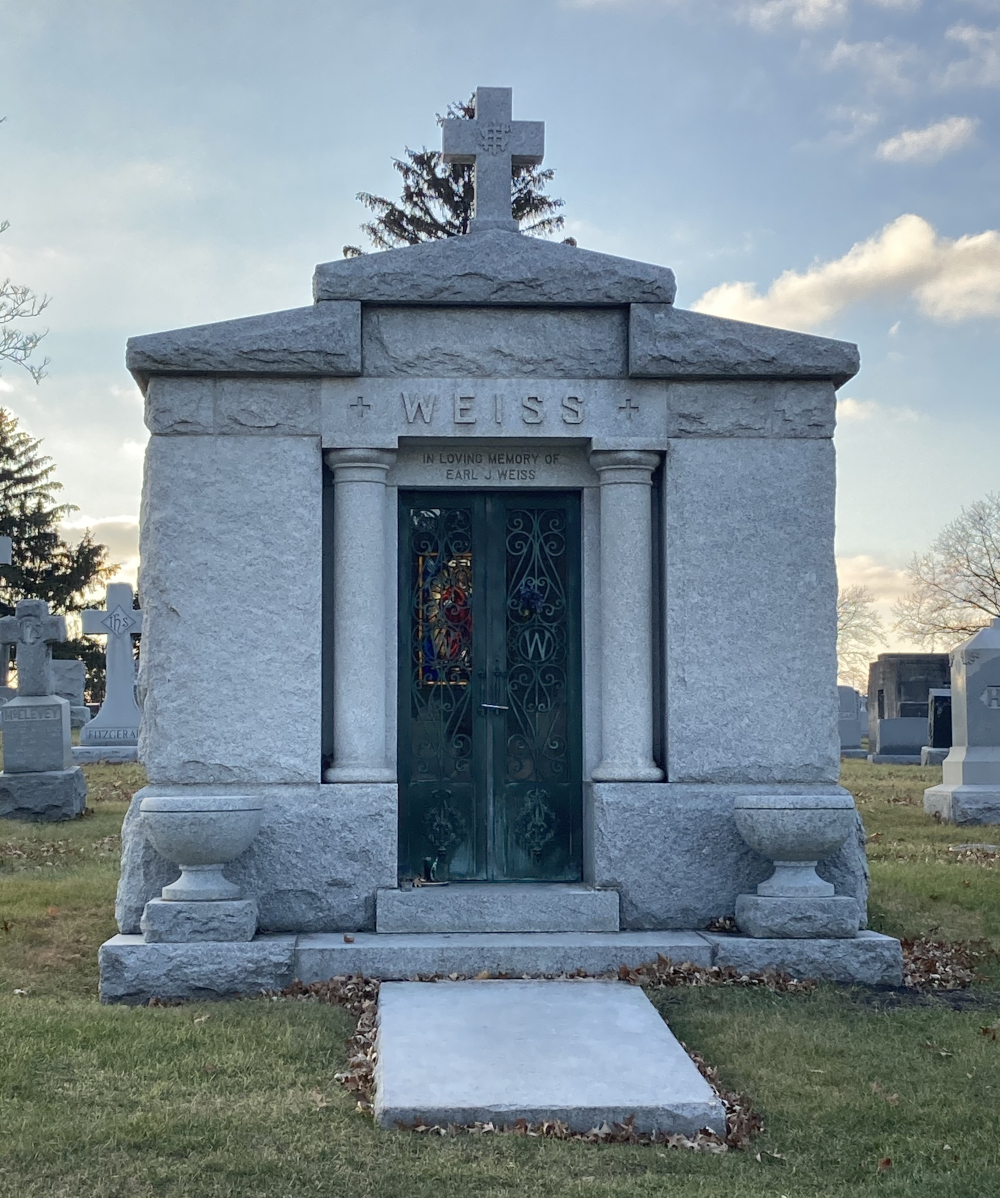
Weiss mausoleum at Mount Carmel Cemetery

Jury selection for a murder trial of Joe Saltis, with whom Weiss sought an alliance, began on October 11, 1926, and Weiss and four of his men were sighted there. With him that day were his bodyguard Sam Pellar, gangster Paddy Murray, attorney William W. O'Brien, and Benjamin Jacobs (an investigator for O'Brien). At four o'clock that afternoon, Weiss and his men left for their State Street headquarters, Schofield's Flowers. The quintet parked their cars on Superior Street and rounded the corner to cross State. As they did, two gunmen hidden in a nearby rooming house opened fire with a submachine gun and shotgun. Weiss and Murray were fatally wounded by this first burst. William O'Brien was hit four times and staggered into a nearby stairwell. At the initial sound of gunfire, a panicked Sam Pellar drew his .38 and fired instinctively towards the shots, unintentionally hitting Weiss as he collapsed onto the sidewalk. Pellar and Jacobs, both wounded, staggered back the way they had come. Bullets followed them the whole way and some chipped the cornerstone of the Holy Name Cathedral directly across the street.

According to the Chicago Police, Jack McGurn was behind the tommy gun that day. Sam "Golf Bag" Hunt, was supporting McGurn from a nearby building, where police found his signature golf bag with a shotgun inside it after the murder. Frank Nitti is credited with masterminding the use of the machine-gun nest in Weiss' assassination. However, a witness, Charles E. McKibben, accused Pellar and Jacobs, the injured men, of having shot Weiss.

Weiss is buried at Mount Carmel Cemetery in Hillside, Illinois, the same place as Al Capone and Dean O'Banion. He was succeeded as leader of the North Side gang by Vincent Drucci.

== In popular culture ==
Weiss and other Prohibition-era mobsters served as the basis for many gangster films of the 1930s. James Cagney, for example, based his character on both Weiss and Chicago gangland figure Dean O'Banion in The Public Enemy (1931).

In 2013 and 2014, Weiss is portrayed by Will Janowitz on the third and fourth seasons of Boardwalk Empire.

Date	Title	Country	Notes
1962	The Untouchables The Canada Run	USA	Portrayed by Gene Roth
1967	The St. Valentine's Day Massacre	USA	Portrayed by Reed Hadley
1975	Capone	USA	Portrayed by John Davis Chandler
2012–13	Boardwalk Empire	USA	Portrayed by Will Janowitz

== See also ==
- List of homicides in Illinois § Organized crime

Preceded by Dean O'Banion	North Side Gang Boss; 1924–1926	Succeeded by Vincent Drucci
