= Lanzetta =

Lanzetta is an Italian surname. Notable people with the surname include:

- Ignatius Lanzetta (1903–?), American gangster
- James J. Lanzetta (1894–1956), American attorney and politician
- Leo Lanzetta (1895–1925), American gangster
- Margaret Lanzetta (born 1957), American artist
- Maria Carmela Lanzetta (born 1955), Italian politician
- Peppe Lanzetta (born 1956), Italian actor

== See also ==
- The Lanzetta Brothers, gang
- Salvatore Lanzetti (c.1710 – c.1780), Italian cellist and composer
