= Atlantic City Conference =

1929 summit of organized crime leaders

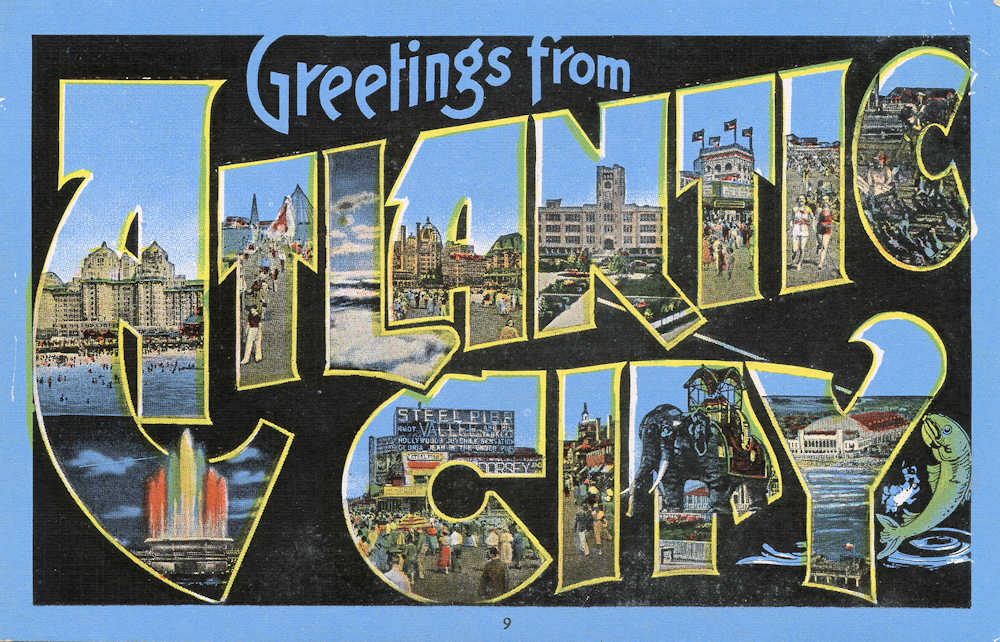
1940 postcard promoting Atlantic City tourism

The Atlantic City Conference, held between 13 and 16 May 1929, was a historic summit of leaders of organized crime in the United States. It is considered by most crime historians to be the earliest organized crime summit held in the US. The conference had a major impact on the future direction of the criminal underworld and held more importance and significance than the Havana Conference of 1946 and the Apalachin meeting of 1957. It also represented the first concrete move toward a National Crime Syndicate.

Details about the conference are difficult to verify. However, it is thought that crime leaders at the conference discussed the violent bootleg wars in New York City and Chicago and how to avoid them in the future, diversification and investment into legal liquor ventures, expansion of illegal operations to offset profit loss from the potential repeal of Prohibition, and reorganization and consolidation of the underworld into a National Crime Syndicate.

== The conference ==
In early May 1929, Meyer Lansky, the Jewish-American crime syndicate boss, married. He concluded that the resort town of Atlantic City, New Jersey would be an ideal place not only for his honeymoon, but also for a conference of major organized crime figures, allowing Lansky and the rest of the bosses to mix pleasure and business. Together with his closest underworld associates, Italian-American mobsters Johnny "The Fox" Torrio, Charlie "Lucky" Luciano and Frank Costello, Lansky planned the conference for the weekend of May 13–16. The organizing host of the conference was Atlantic City and South Jersey crime boss, Enoch "Nucky" Johnson, who provided the hotel accommodations, food, and entertainment for all, while guaranteeing that there would be no police interference.

The conference was the first known underworld summit of its kind and the first concrete move towards establishing the National Crime Syndicate that eventually controlled all major organized crime activities across the United States.

The largest delegation came from the New York/New Jersey area. Attendees included Torrio, who had formerly led the largest organized crime outfit in Chicago before turning over control to Al Capone and who had more recently helped organize a loose cartel of East Coast bootleggers in which Lansky, Luciano, and Costello were active.

Luciano and Costello, then part of the Masseria family, attended, along with their associates Giuseppe "Joe Adonis" Doto and Vito Genovese, and Guarino "Willie Moore" Moretti, who handled the Masseria family's Newark, New Jersey interests. Giuseppe Masseria himself was not invited.

In addition to the Masseria family members, Albert "The Mad Hatter" Anastasia, Frank "Cheech" Scalise, and Vincent Mangano came from the D'Aquila/Mineo Family of Manhattan, while Gaetano "Tommy Brown" Lucchese represented the Reina Family out of the Bronx. Lansky and Benjamin "Bugsy" Siegel, the bosses of the Bugs and Meyer Mob, took part, as did Louis "Lepke" Buchalter and Jacob "Gurrah" Shapiro, also known as the "Gorilla Boys". Abner "Longy" Zwillman, who was based in Newark, attended, as did Dutch Schultz, Bronx beer baron and Harlem numbers king, Owen "Owney the Killer" Madden, boss of Manhattan's Hell's Kitchen, and Frank Erickson, a Costello associate who had formerly been a lieutenant to Arnold Rothstein.

Chicago was represented by Al Capone, Frank "The Enforcer" Nitti, Jake "Greasy Thumb" Guzik, Frank "Frank Cline" Rio, all top members of the South Side Capone Gang and representing Midwest interests. Capone's delegation also included Frank McErlane of the South Side Saltis/McErlane Gang, a Capone bodyguard and only one of two Irish gangsters present.

From Philadelphia came the top Jewish-American bosses, Irving "Waxey Gordon" Wexler, Harry "Nig Rosen" Stromberg, Max "Boo Boo" Hoff, Irving "Bitzy" Bitz and Charles Schwartz. From Cleveland came the "Little Jewish Navy" of Morris "Moe" Dalitz and Louis "Lou Roddy" Rothkopf, along with adopted Polizzi Family member, Leo "Charles Polizzi" Berkowitz, who represented Cleveland's "Mayfield Road Mob". The feared Purple Gang of Detroit was represented by Abe Bernstein and his brother Joseph "Bugs Bill" Bernstein. Boston's most prominent bootlegger, Charles "King" Solomon, was present, while Kansas City's "Balestrere Gang" and the "Pendergast Machine" were represented by boss John Lazia. Delegations from Florida and Louisiana were also present at the time, which would most likely be Luciano and Costello allies, Santo Trafficante, Sr. of Tampa and Sylvestro "Silver Dollar Sam" Carolla of New Orleans.

Two of the underworld's most powerful leaders, Giuseppe "Joe the Boss" Masseria and Salvatore Maranzano of New York, were not invited. Nor was Joseph "Joe Bananas" Bonanno, then Maranzano's top lieutenant and aide and later one of the architects of the "National Crime Syndicate" and the La Cosa Nostra Commission. The old guard represented by Masseria and Maranzano, often derisively referred to as "Mustache Petes", maintained traditional old world principles that restricted them from working with other ethnic gangs outside of the Italian underworld, contrary to the inclusive and cooperative approach that other leaders, such as Luciano and Torrio, wished to promote.

The conference started off with an embarrassing incident for some delegates. The first hotel Nucky Johnson had chosen, the exclusive Atlantic City Breakers Hotel, refused to provide accommodations to guests who were not white Anglo-Saxon Protestants. When the hotel's management found out that some guests were trying to check in with Anglo Saxon aliases, they were refused admittance. Johnson rushed over to the hotel when he heard about the problem, and engaged in a loud argument with Al Capone, who blamed Johnson for not making the proper arrangements. Johnson pushed Capone into a limousine and ordered every one to follow him. They headed for the Ritz-Carlton and Ambassador hotels, where Capone continued to rage at Johnson, ripping several framed paintings and photos off the walls of the hotel to throw at Johnson.

For the first three days there were a constant round of parties at the hotels with Nucky Johnson supplying plenty of liquor, food and girls for entertainment. For the guests who brought their wives or girlfriends, Johnson provided the women with fur capes as gifts. Meyer Lansky, who was the new bridegroom and guest of honor, received the Presidential suite at the Ritz Hotel, with a constant supply of champagne for him and his wife Anna.

There were several important items to discuss among the attendees, such as constant competition for imported and bootleg liquor profits among the gangs, what to do about the liquor business if Prohibition ended, development of gambling operations, and what to do about the Chicago violence problem. The Atlantic City delegates conducted their more serious discussions and business privately in conference rooms atop the Ritz and Ambassador Hotels.

Important decisions were made to stop competing with each other during the remainder of Prohibition and cooperate in pooling their resources to maximize profits and develop a national monopoly in the illegal liquor business. One of the most important discussions was what to do when Prohibition ended. The bosses decided to reorganize themselves and their gangs into cooperative organizations, investing in legitimate breweries, distilleries and liquor importation franchises. Making investments in the legitimate liquor business and owning nightclubs, bars and restaurants to distribute the liquor and maximize profits would give the Syndicate some security against the loss of business if and when Prohibition was repealed.

The delegates also held discussions about taking a larger interest in illegal and cooperative gambling activities such as bookmaking, horse racing and casinos. The New York and Chicago representatives laid out a plan to tie in the national wire service for horse racing bettors with the Daily Racing Form and to lay off bets throughout the United States. This idea was introduced to the conference delegates after Al Capone ran into Chicago businessman and underworld associate Moses Annenberg, who controlled the mob that controlled distribution of William R. Hearst's newspapers in the Chicago area. The crime families in New York and Chicago would oversee and direct operations for this cooperative and very lucrative venture. New York bosses Costello and Lansky were chosen as directors to coordinate the operations along with Chicago representatives. New York's future layoff king and gambling czar Frank Erickson was chosen to oversee the organization of the operation along with Chicago's Annenberg.

Another important topic was the ongoing violence in Chicago. The underworld wars in Chicago and to some extent New York had brought about a public outcry for law enforcement to stop the violence while heightened media and law enforcement attention was placing pressure on underworld operations around the country. Most of the pressure was due to the recent St. Valentine's Day Massacre in Chicago. With former Al Capone boss and mentor Johnny Torrio taking the lead and Charlie "Lucky" Luciano and the other delegates backing him up, Capone was chosen as a sacrificial lamb to ease the heat brought on the underworld and its leaders. Al Capone was convinced after much debate to allow himself to be arrested on a minor charge and sent to prison for a short period of time, deflecting the media and law enforcement pressure for the good of the whole underworld. After the conference was concluded, Chicago underworld boss Al Capone and his bodyguard Frank Rio went to Philadelphia, where two friendly police officers arrested them for carrying a gun. Al Capone and Frank Rio were sentenced to a year in prison, but were released and back in Chicago after several months.

Not all discussions were held behind closed doors; delegates also continued their conversations out in the open, with some delegates taking off their socks and rolling up their pants for walks along the beach. This made the Conference no great secret, with local newspapers carrying photos of Al Capone and other prominent delegates as they cruised down the Jersey shore boardwalk and beaches, dipping their feet into the water.

== The future of organized crime ==
Discussions concerning the division of the country into exclusive franchises and territories for the bosses and their gangs and the creation of a National Syndicate to resolve disputes between gangs started at the Atlantic City Conference. The highly successful "Big Seven Group" organized by Torrio and others to coordinate East Coast bootlegging activities was used as a model for this new "National Syndicate".

These discussions took place, however, as tensions between Masseria and Maranzano were about to lead to the Castellammarese War. The leaders who attended the conference eventually brought that war to an end by eliminating the old guard leaders, or "Mustache Petes". The Syndicate leaders in Chicago, Detroit, Boston, Philadelphia, and elsewhere would back up the New York forces through removal of the old guard in their areas if need be.

== Atlantic City delegates ==
The terms capo and consigliere were not used until Salvatore Maranzano modeled the reorganized Italian underworld on the military of the Roman Empire in 1931; the terms lieutenant and advisor were more common at the time, except with the Maranzano family, (future Bonanno crime family), which had already been following the strict Cosa Nostra traditions of their native Sicily. The position of consigliere did not exist until Charlie "Lucky" Luciano became the de facto first amongst equals in La Cosa Nostra and added the position to the Family hierarchy in 1931 when he formed the Commission.

Underworld members, city or delegation they represented and their rank at time of conference:

Atlantic City:

- Enoch "Nucky" Johnson - South Jersey/Atlantic City Irish machine boss/host

New York/New Jersey:

- John "The Fox" Torrio - Former Chicago Torrio/Capone Gang boss/New York advisor
- Salvatore "Charles 'Lucky' Luciano" Lucania - Masseria Family lieutenant/New York
- Frank "The Prime Minister" Costello - Masseria Family lieutenant/New York
- Giuseppe "Joe Adonis" Doto - Masseria Family lieutenant/New York
- Vito Genovese - Masseria Family lieutenant/New York
- Guarino Moretti - Masseria Family lieutenant/New Jersey
- Vincent Mangano - D'Aquila/Mineo Family lieutenant/New York
- Frank Scalise - D'Aquila Mineo Family lieutenant/New York
- Albert Anastasia - D'Aquila/Mineo Family lieutenant/New York
- Gaetano "Tommy Brown" Lucchese - Reina Family lieutenant/New York
- Meyer "The Brain" Lansky - Bugs & Meyer Mob boss/New York
- Benjamin "Bugsy" Siegel - Bugs & Meyer Mob boss/New York
- Louis Buchalter - Buchalter/Shapiro Gang boss/New York
- Jacob Shapiro - Buchalter/Shapiro Gang boss/New York
- Dutch Schultz - Schultz Gang boss/New York
- Abner Zwillman - North Jersey/Zwillman Gang boss/New Jersey
- Owney Madden - Irish Combine boss/New York
- Frank Erickson - former Rothstein lieutenant/Costello associate/New York
- Tommy Gagliano - Reina Family underboss/New York
- Carlo Gambino - D'Aquila/Mineo Family lieutenant/New York

Chicago:

- Alphonse "Scarface" Capone - South Side/Capone Gang boss/Chicago
- Frank "The Enforcer" Nitti - South Side/Capone Gang lieutenant/Chicago
- Jake Guzik - South Side/Capone Gang lieutenant/Chicago
- Frank "Frank Cline" Rio - South Side/Capone bodyguard/Chicago
- Frank McErlane - Saltis/McErlane Gang boss/Chicago

Philadelphia:

- Waxey Gordon - Jewish Mob boss/Philadelphia
- Max Hoff - Jewish Mob boss/Philadelphia
- Harry Stromberg - Jewish Mob boss/Philadelphia
- Irving Bitz - Jewish Mob boss/Philadelphia
- Charles Schwartz - Jewish Mob boss/Philadelphia
- Samuel Lazar - Jewish Mob boss/Philadelphia

Cleveland:

- Morris Dalitz - Little Jewish Navy boss/Cleveland
- Louis Rothkopf - Little Jewish Navy boss/Cleveland
- Leo Berkowitz - Little Jewish Navy/Mayfield Road Mob associate/Cleveland

Detroit:

- William Joseph Bernstein - Purple Gang boss/Detroit (a.k.a. "Bill Bugs")
- Abraham Bernstein - Purple Gang boss/Detroit

Kansas City:

- Giovanni Lazia - Pendergast Machine/Balestrere Gang lieutenant/Kansas City (a.k.a. Lazio)

New England:

- Charles Solomon - Jewish Mob boss/Boston
- Frank "The Cheeseman" Cucchiara - North End Gang/Buccola Family lieutenant/Boston
- Frank "Bootsy" Morelli - Morelli Gang boss/Providence

Florida:

- Santo Trafficante Sr. - Tampa Family underboss/Tampa

Louisiana:

- Sylvestro Corallo - Matranga/Giacona Family lieutenant/New Orleans

=== Problems identifying attendees ===
Some historians believe that representation at the conference was not representative of the ethnic make-up of the US criminal element, being that the delegations consisted of mostly Italian and Jewish crime leaders. Because of the lack of a substantial Irish delegation, a conclusion was made that this could have been the beginning of underworld domination by Italian and Jewish crime groups.

The Irish still possessed an influential presence in America's criminal and political worlds and had a number of dominant crime leaders in New York, Boston and Philadelphia. The most prominent and well-known Irish bosses of the time included Frank Wallace of Boston, Daniel "Danny" Walsh of Providence, Chicago's George "Bugs" Moran, the South Side O'Donnells (brothers Edward (Spike), Steven, Tommy and Walter), and the West Side O'Donnells (Klondike and Myles), and William "Big Bill" Dwyer, Charles "Vannie" Higgins, Jack "Legs" Diamond and Vincent "Mad Dog" Coll of New York. Walsh was one of the leaders that many crime historians are unsure attended the meeting. Walsh was one of the most prominent Irish bootleggers of the Prohibition era, was an associate and partner of New York's Irish Combine leaders; Dwyer and Madden, and was an alleged member of the "Big Seven Group". This alone should have guaranteed his invitation, but some crime historians point to the fact that only two other Irish bosses were confirmed to be present at the meeting. Walsh's membership in the "Big Seven Group" and the fact that he was not killed until 1933 makes for a good argument to include him.

Some crime historians, such as T. J. English, believe that the Italian and Jewish crime bosses did not invite the most prominent Irish bootleggers and criminals of the time to the Atlantic City Conference because they intended to marginalize them, along with the old guard or "Mustache Petes" that controlled the majority of criminal operations in the big cities. Historians of organized crime note that the motivations were not out of some ethnic, racial hatred and nor was it out of sheer greed. The Irish had begun a type of criminal assimilation, leaving behind violent street rackets and moving onto more sophisticated types of organized illegality, such as taking over and corrupting the police force and local government of large cities. As author T. J. English writes; "In later years, when Luciano or Meyer Lansky would ask, “What about the Irish? Who’s taking care of the Irish?” They didn’t mean Irish mobsters. They meant the Irish cops, politicians, and establishment figures who were ‘friendly.’ In the eyes of many Italian and Jewish gangsters, this was the fair and proper role for the Irish in the underworld; since they had ‘gotten here first,’ so to speak, and had infiltrated the upperworld, that was their function. The rest should be left to the Italians, Jews, Poles, and even the blacks." That might explain why Frank Wallace was killed by hitters in Boston's Italian Mob in 1931 and Danny Walsh disappeared in 1933.

Whether or not there was a concerted plan to exclude them because of their ethnicity, several prominent Irish Mob bosses were left out of the conference, first and foremost, because they were currently engaged in full-scale gang warfare with rival Italian and Jewish bosses. Bugs Moran would have been the Irish boss to represent Chicago, but he had just missed being killed in the St. Valentine's Day Massacre when his gang was sizably decimated; he faded into obscurity soon after. The South Side and West Side O'Donnells of Chicago were not as powerful as Moran and would not have been chosen to represent Chicago anyway, as they were at war with Al Capone and his allies. New York's Vannie Higgins, Legs Diamond and Vincent Coll might have been invited but were involved in the "Manhattan Beer Wars" against Jewish bosses Dutch Schultz, Waxey Gordon and the Hells Kitchen Irish gang boss, Owney Madden. At the Atlantic City Conference, Schultz was heard saying at the Ambassador Hotel, "This crazy maniac Coll is causing me no end of grief". To which Gordon responded, "Yeah, and what about this bastard, Legs Diamond? He's hijacking my trucks and raiding our clip joints all over North Jersey". Vannie Higgins was killed on January 19, 1932, in New York, Legs Diamond was shot three times and killed in his Albany, New York, hideout on December 18, 1931, and Mad Dog Coll was killed inside a New York phone booth by Schultz gunmen, while talking to Owney Madden, on February 8, 1932.

Of note is the fate of Irish Mob boss Bill Dwyer. He was not killed, nor was he forced out of the rackets by any other gangster, Italian or otherwise. By his own choice, he retired from organized crime towards the end of Prohibition in 1932–33 and settled into life with his wife and five children in Belle Harbor, Queens. He died there in 1946 at the age of 63, after suffering a heart attack.

One Jewish criminal killed following the conference was Jewish Mob boss and Boston's most prominent crime leader and bootlegger, Charles "King" Solomon, who was killed at his Roxbury, Boston speakeasy, known as the Cotton Club, on January 24, 1933. Law enforcement theorize that either Italian or Irish underworld leaders in the North End Buccola Family of Boston, or the Walsh Mob of Providence, had Solomon assassinated. Either way, Solomon became another victim of the mob war for dominance in New England's underworld in the midst of the area's Prohibition wars. As Irish bosses Wallace and (most likely) Walsh were killed by Boston's North End Italians, Solomon was most likely killed by them as well, being that Italian dominance was uncontested in the New England underworld thereafter, other than in South Boston, which was heavily populated by the Irish.

== See also ==
- Havana Conference, 1946
- Grand Hotel et des Palmes Mafia meeting, 1957
- La Stella Restaurant meeting, 1966.

== Notes ==
=== References ===
- McPhaul, Jack. Johnny Torrio: The First of the Gang Lords. Arlington House, 1970.
- Messick, Hank. Lansky. Berkley Medallion, 1971.
- Gosch, Martin & Hammer, Richard. The Last Testament of Lucky Luciano. Dell Publishing Company, 1974.
- Wolf, George. Frank Costello: The Prime Minister of the Underworld. William Morrow & Company, 1974.
- Charbanneau, Jean Pierre. The Canadian Connection. Optimum Publishing, 1976.
- Fopiano, Willie & Harney, John. The Godson: A True Life Account of 20 Years Inside the Mob. St. Martins Press/Thomas Dunne Books, 1993.
- Time Life Books. True Crime: Mafia. Time Warner, 1993.
- Sifakis, Carl. The Mafia Encyclopedia: Second Edition. Checkmark Books, 1999.
- Reppetto, Thomas. The American Mafia: A History of Its Rise to Power. Henry Holt & Company, 2004.
- English, T. J. Paddy Wacked: The Untold Story of the Irish American Gangster. Regan Books, 2005.
