= Lanzetta brothers =

Brothers who ran bootlegging operations in Philadelphia

Lanzetta brothers or Lanzetta family
- Founded: Early 1920s
- Founded by: Leo Lanzetta
- Founding location: South Philadelphia, Pennsylvania
- Years active: Early 1920s–1940
- Territory: South Philadelphia and Atlantic City
- Ethnicity: Sicilians, Campanians
- Membership: ca. 20 members and associates
- Leaders: Pius, Leo and Ignatius Lanzetta
- Criminal activities: Drug trafficking, prostitution, bootlegging, numbers writing
- Allies: Michael Falcone, Louis Delrossi (associates of Lanzetta family)
- Rivals: Mickey Duffy (boss Polish mob), Joseph Bruno (boss Philadelphia crime family), Salvatore Sabella (boss Philadelphia crime family), and other various street and bootlegging gangs in South Philadelphia

The Lanzetta brothers, also known as the Lanzetti brothers or Lanzetta/i crime family due to an incorrect spelling used by newspapers, was a group of six brothers who ran bootlegging operations in Philadelphia and possibly Atlantic City.

== Early lives ==
There were six brothers in the gang:

- Leo. b. 1895 in Washington, D.C.
- Pius. b. 1898 in Philadelphia.
- Ignatius, b. 1903 in Philadelphia.
- Hugo, aka "Willie". b. 1902 in Philadelphia.
- Lucian, b. 1908 in Philadelphia.
- Teofilo, aka "Teo". b. 1910 in Philadelphia.

Their father Ignazio Lanzetta was born in the Italian town of Roseto Valfortore, then part of The Kingdom of the Two Sicilies, around 1852. Their mother Michelina Luisi was born in nearby Castelluccio Valmaggiore around 1874.

== Prohibition and bootlegging ==
When Prohibition went into effect in January 1920, the Lanzettas organized an "Alky Cooking" supply network by providing a contingent of row house dwellers with home stills and paying them to produce saleable liquor. The brothers then sold the liquor at higher prices. Their most trusted associates included Louis "Fats" Delrossi and Mike Falcone. The brothers' criminal careers were marked by frequent arrests and brutal violence.

At various times, the brothers feuded with several different groups of racketeers in South Philadelphia, as well as Mickey Duffy and some of his partners. Between 1924 and 1939, at least one brother was involved as a suspect or a material witness in no less than fifteen murder cases, including Pius' imprisonment and dismissal during the early stages of the investigation into the murder of Mickey Duffy. The brothers were also rivals of Max Hoff's criminal organization.

Leo and Ignatius killed rival dope peddler and bootlegger Joe Bruno on August 18, 1925, at 8th and Catherine Streets. Bruno was also a made man in the Philadelphia crime family.

Leo was killed on August 22, 1925, as he left a barber shop at 7th and Bainbridge Streets, in retaliation for the murder of Joe Bruno. Sicilian Philadelphia family boss Salvatore Sabella was Leo's suspected killer. Pius was killed in a luncheonette on December 31, 1936, at 726 South Eighth Street. Willie was found with his head in a burlap bag and a bullet in his brain on July 2, 1939.

Teo was convicted on drug trafficking charges and sent to Leavenworth Prison in 1940.

== Lanzetta et al. vs. New Jersey ==
Along with Delrossi and Falcone, Ignatius was sent to prison in 1936 for breaking New Jersey's "Gangster Law" and released after the Supreme Court overthrew the law in the decision Lanzetta Et Al. v. New Jersey in March 1939. Writing for the majority, Justice Pierce Butler stated that:

"The challenged provision condemns no act or omission; the terms it employs to indicate what it purports to denounce are so vague, indefinite and uncertain that it must be condemned as repugnant to the due process clause of the Fourteenth Amendment."

When Ignatius was released, he relocated to Detroit, Michigan, with Lucien and their mother.

== Television ==
In the first season of the HBO series Boardwalk Empire, the Lanzetta brothers are the basis for Nucky Thompson's main rivals, the D'Alessio brothers. The D'Alessio brothers try to take over Atlantic City, New Jersey's bootlegging operations along with Mickey Doyle, Lucky Luciano, Meyer Lansky, and Arnold Rothstein. In the show, the brothers' names are Leo, Ignatius, Matteo, Lucien, Sixtus, and Pius. In the show, Ignatius and Pius are killed by freelance assassin Richard Harrow, Matteo is killed by Atlantic City North Side leader Albert "Chalky" White, Lucien and Leo are killed by James "Jimmy" Darmody, and Sixtus is killed by South Side Gang bouncer Alphonse "Scarface" Capone in Chicago, Illinois.

== Members of the Lanzetta gang ==
=== Bosses ===
- Leo Lanzetta: Early 1920s–1925 – Killed after leaving a barbershop for the murder of Giuseppe "Joe Bruno" Dovi in 1925.
- Pius Lanzetta: Early 1920s–1936 – Killed by enemy bullets in 1936.
- Ignatius "Frank Pius" Lanzetta: Early 1920s–1940 – Convicted and imprisoned for four years, later fleeing with Lucien to Detroit.

=== Other members ===
- Willie Lanzetta: Early 1920s–1939 – Shot in the head and beheaded in 1939.
- Teo Lanzetta: Early 1920s–1940 – Imprisoned on drug trafficking charges in 1940.
- Lucien Lanzetta: Early 1920s–1940 – Fled to Detroit with Ignatius and their mother in 1940.
- Michael Falcone: Early 1920s–1940 – Convicted and imprisoned for four years from 1936 to 1940.
- Louis "Fats" Delrossi: Early 1920s–1940 – Convicted and imprisoned for four years from 1936 to 1940.

=== Rival ===
- Salvatore Sabella – Sent to Philadelphia by Sicilian Mafia capofamiglia to organize the city's rackets. Sabella died in 1962.
- Giuseppe "Joseph Bruno" Dovi – Sabella's protégé. Rival dope peddler and bootlegger. Killed by the Lanzetta's in 1925.
- William Michael "Mickey Duffy" Cusick – Rival bootlegger. Rival of Philadelphia Jewish Mob boss Max "Boo Boo" Hoff. Possibly killed by the Lanzettas in 1931.
- Bruno crime family – Rival Sicilian crime family.
