= Katzenberg =

Katzenberg may refer to:

== People ==
- Dena Katzenberg, American museum curator
- Jacob Katzenberg, New York crime figure
- Jeffrey Katzenberg, American film producer

== Places ==
- Katzenberg Tunnel
- Katzenberg Hillfort
