= Jacob Katzenberg =

American criminal who distributed narcotics to mobsters

- Born: c. 1888; Russia
- Other name: Yasha
- Penalty: Narcotics ($10,000 fine, 10 years prison)

Jacob "Yasha" Katzenberg (born c. 1888) was an organized crime figure in New York who supplied narcotics to mobsters including Charles "Lucky" Luciano, Waxey Gordon, Charles "King" Solomon, Harry "Nig Rosen" Stromberg, the Torrio–Capone organization as well as mobsters in Detroit, Kansas City, and St. Louis.

== Biography ==
Born in Russia, Katzenberg grew up in Manhattan's Lower East Side. In 1926, when he was already working as a liquor buyer in Europe for the New York Mob, Arnold Rothstein recruited him to purchase opium and heroin from European sources, which Rothstein smuggled into the US through a respectable import firm and art galleries he owned. Following Rothstein's murder in 1928, Luciano and Louis "Lepke" Buchalter retained Katzenberg as their European buyer for both heroin and bootleg liquor.

During the early 1930s, narcotics became harder to obtain in Europe after the League of Nations's promulgation of the Narcotics Convention of 1931, which encouraged member nations to reduce drug production to the level necessary to meet domestic medical needs. When the end of Prohibition in 1933 eliminated the Mob's need for a European liquor buyer, Katzenberg traveled to Asia to purchase both opium and heroin. Returning to Brooklyn, he established an opium processing plant on Seymour Avenue (reportedly backed by Buchalter and Meyer Lansky among others rumored to be partners in the operation) along with several other similar operations.

In December 1935, authorities discovered the plant following an explosion which destroyed much of the manufacturing equipment. However, agents with the Federal Narcotics Bureau were unable to obtain enough evidence to press charges against Katzenberg and his partners. Meeting with Buchalter and Lansky, the three agreed that he and Buchalter would continue smuggling narcotics from Hong Kong and Shanghai into the United States through connections with officials within the United States Customs. It was later claimed by customs officials that $10 million was made from only six purchases made by Katzenberg between December 1935 and February 1937.

Informants eventually infiltrated the drug ring and many of its members including Katzenberg were indicted by federal authorities. Fleeing the country, Katzenberg traveled to Romania and, although detained by officials, he was instead deported to neighboring Greece, where he was held in custody until his extradition to the United States. Eventually convicted on narcotics charges, Katzenberg was issued a fine of $10,000 and sentenced ten years in prison. He would later testify against Buchalter and Johnny Torrio and, following his release from prison, disappeared from public record.
