= David Packer =

David Packer may refer to:

- David Packer (artist) (born 1960), American and English artist
- David Packer (actor) (born 1962), American actor

== See also ==
- David Pecker (born 1951), American publisher
