= McErlane =

McErlane is an Irish surname. Notable people with the surname include:

- Frank McErlane (1894–1932), American Prohibition-era gangster
- Maria McErlane (born 1957), British actor and comedian

== See also ==
- McErlean
