= Nig Rosen =

American mobster

- Born: Harry Stromberg c. 1902; Russian Empire
- Died: November 22, 1953 (aged 50–51)
- Organization: 69th Street Gang
- Known for: Racketeering, drug trafficking

Details
- Country: United States
- Locations: Philadelphia, Atlantic City, Baltimore, and Washington, D.C.

Harry Stromberg (c. 1902 – November 22, 1953), known as Nig Rosen, was an American mobster who was a major organized crime figure on the East Coast with influence as far as Philadelphia, Atlantic City, Baltimore, and Washington, D.C.

== Biography ==
Stromberg was an emigrant from the Russian Empire. He lived in New York City and came to Philadelphia during the Prohibition era.

Going by the name Rosen, he emerged as a prominent racketeer in southwest Philadelphia and, as head of the 69th Street Gang, became involved in prostitution, extortion, labor racketeering and later in narcotics with Arnold Rothstein during the mid-1920s. Succeeding Max "Boo Hoo" Hoff as the city's chief bootlegger during Prohibition, he was a member of the "Big Seven" aligned with the Philadelphia faction along with Waxey Gordon and Irving Blitz, later attending the Atlantic City Conference.

During the 1930s, he and Meyer Lansky worked on expanding drug trafficking operations in Mexico as an alternative to older routes such as Japan now closed with the United States' entry into World War II. By 1939, a lucrative heroin network had been established from drug traffickers based in Mexico City to major cities across the United States including New York, Philadelphia, Miami, and Los Angeles, as well as Havana, Cuba.

He and his lieutenant, driver and bodyguard Willie Weisberg, were named as dominant racketeers involved in the numbers racket under testimony from police superintendent George F. Richardson during the Kefauver Committee in 1951.

During the early 1950s, Rosen became partners with Gaetano "Tommy" Lucchese after buying the Sweet Valley Improvement Company which was used by the Lucchese crime family to ship clothing out of New York's garment district.
