= Baltimore album quilts =

Style of quilts from Baltimore, Maryland

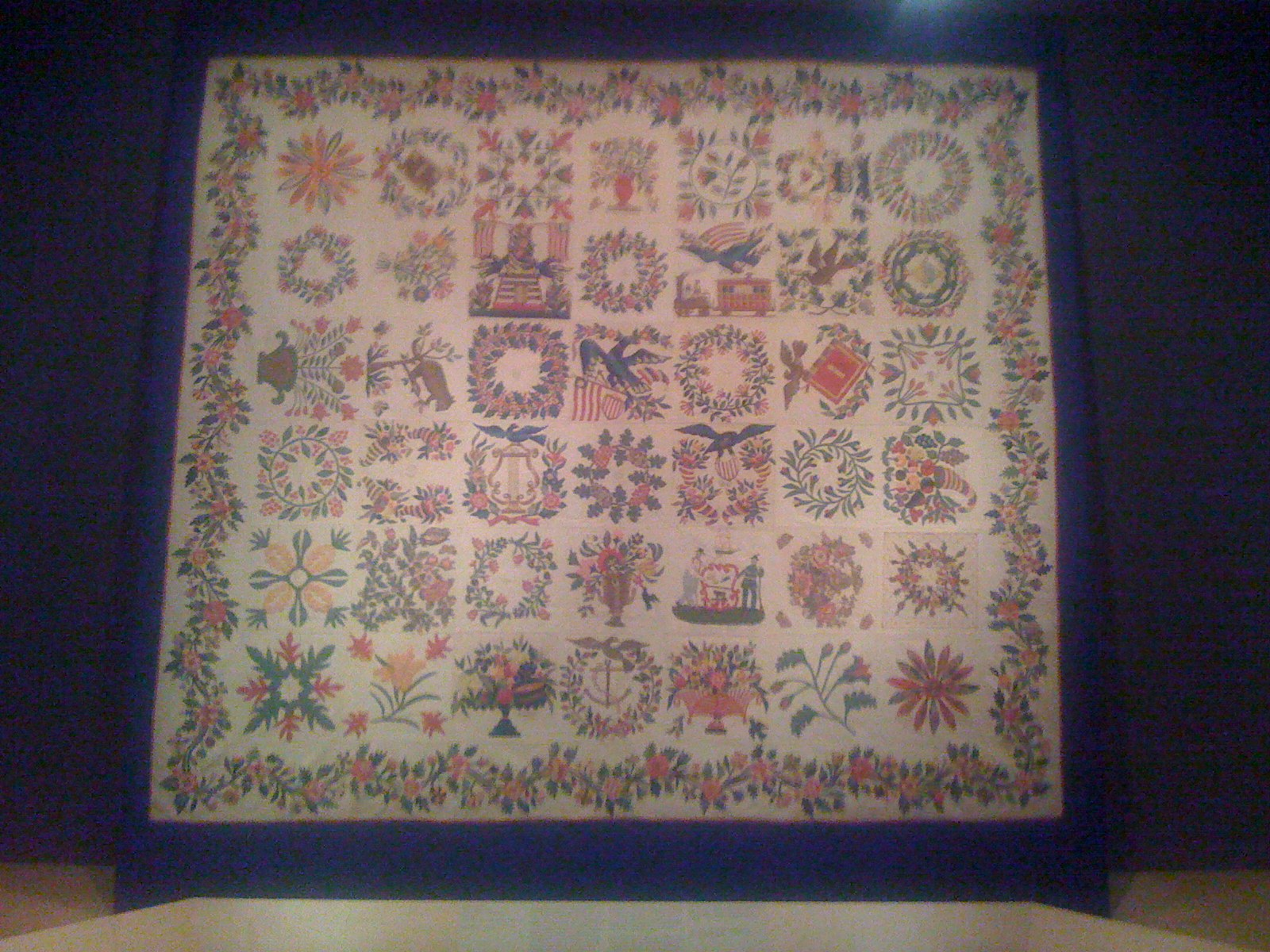
An album quilt (c. 1850), part of the collection at the Baltimore Museum of Art

Baltimore album quilts originated in Baltimore, Maryland, in the 1840s. They have become one of the most popular styles of quilts and are still made today. These quilts are made up of a number of squares called blocks. Each block has been appliquéd with a different design. The designs are often floral, but many other motifs are also used, such as eagles and landmarks. They have a background of white and incorporate many primary colors such as reds, greens and blues.

== History of the album quilt ==
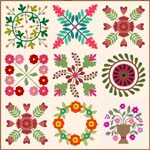
Album Style Quilt

In the beginning, these quilts of appliquéd blocks were often designed by the maker. In time, patterns by accomplished designers were used.

Baltimore Album Quilts reflected the prosperous community of Baltimore, the second largest city in the United States until the American Civil War, as most were made not with scraps, but with new fabric. Improvements in fabric manufacture and dying provided new colors that were incorporated into the album designs. As the popularity of this quilt style grew, women far beyond Baltimore began making these album quilts.

Most Baltimore Album quilts were signed. The discovery of an indelible ink made it possible to ink flowery poetry and sayings along with a signature on each block. It appears making these quilts were especially popular with young women. Many included blocks each made by a different person. The complexity of the designs of the blocks demonstrated the skill and taste of the maker. Many hours were devoted to the creation of each of these quilts, and many were carefully preserved as family heirlooms.

The largest collection of Baltimore Album quilts can be found at the Maryland Historical Society in Baltimore's historic Mt. Vernon neighborhood. There, over 10,750 textiles including the quilts, are preserved with other samplers and embroideries.

Dena Katzenberg, textile curator at the Baltimore Museum of Art, organized an exhibition of Baltimore Album quilt coverlets at the American Wing of the Metropolitan Museum of Art in 1981.

== Selected works ==
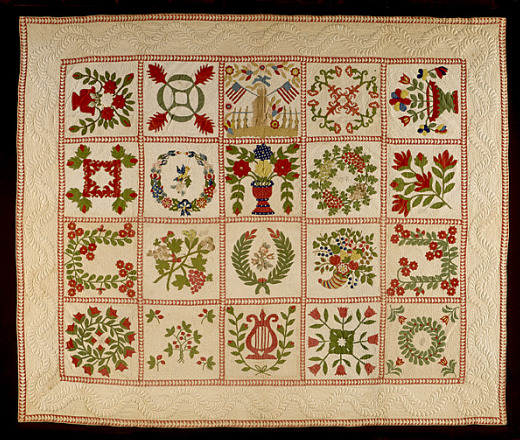
Baltimore Album quilt, c. 1848, collection of the Los Angeles County Museum of Art.

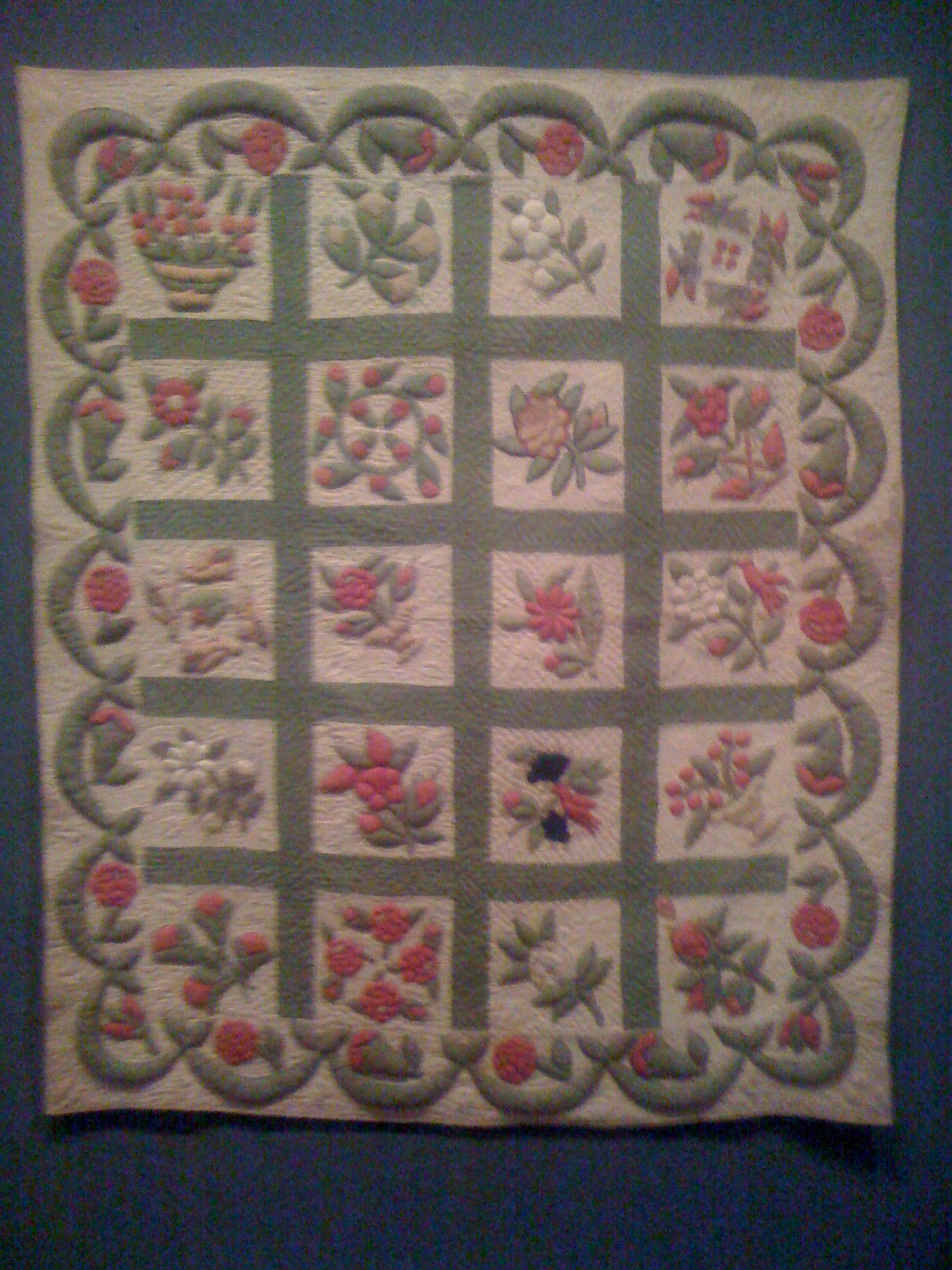
An Album Crib Quilt (c. 1850), part of the collection at the Baltimore Museum of Art.
