= Danny Walsh =

American gangster

- Born: 1893; Cumberland, Rhode Island, United States
- Disappeared: February 2, 1933 (aged 40); Pawtuxet Village, Rhode Island, U.S.
- Status: Missing for 93 years, 8 months and 3 days
- Died: February 2, 1933?
- Occupation: Bootlegger

Daniel L. "Danny" Walsh (c. 1893 – February 2, 1933?) was an Irish-American organized crime figure in Providence, Rhode Island involved in bootlegging during Prohibition. He was the top underworld figure in southern New England, and was one of the last major Irish-American gangsters in the region, until his kidnapping and apparent murder in 1933.

== Biography ==
Born in the Cumberland mill village of Valley Falls, Walsh was a clerk in a Pawtucket hardware store before he entered bootlegging in 1920. First driving alcohol shipments for other local bootleggers, by the mid-1920s he had established a formidable bootlegging operation which included planes, automobiles and a fleet of boats, one of them the legendary rum-runner called the "Black Duck", earning him a reputation as one of the most successful, as well as colorful, bootleggers on the east coast. Considering himself a “gentleman farmer”, Walsh had spent much of his money on thoroughbreds which he raised for his farm in Charlestown, Rhode Island; he also owned two high-class apartments in the east side of Providence and a waterfront mansion in Charlestown.

Rhode Island was known for its lax enforcement of the Volstead Act, being one of two states which refused to ratify the 18th Amendment. The federal government charged Walsh not with bootlegging but with tax evasion, claiming $350,000 in back taxes and penalties owed the Internal Revenue Service. Walsh and authorities ultimately agreed on a lesser sum.

Following the aftermath of the Stock Market Crash of 1929, Walsh enjoyed enormous wealth as one of the country's largest bootleggers. One of four Irish-Americans in the "Big Seven", his frequent business trips to New York were speculated by the press to be meetings with other members of the "combine", which included New York's William "Big Bill" Dwyer and Owney "The Killer" Madden and Boston's Joseph Kennedy.

== Disappearance and aftermath ==
His attendance at the later Atlantic City Conference allowed him to gain an inside scoop to what was about to go down. He heard the Capones were moving in on the action as Italian immigrant criminal groups assumed greater prominence. In 1933, during the last months of Prohibition, Walsh was last seen on the night of February 2, 1933 at the Bank Cafe in Pawtuxet Village in Warwick, Rhode Island, after having dinner with six business associates. Several days after his disappearance, his brother Joseph Walsh received a ransom note demanding $40,000. Although Joseph Walsh traveled to Boston to pay the ransom demand, Daniel Walsh was never returned.

A federal inquiry was held shortly after his disappearance and, although Walsh was named as a member of the "Big Seven" in testimony from a former associate, the investigation failed to solve his disappearance. Numerous rumors circulated about his disappearance, including his body being stuffed into a barrel filled with cement and dumped into the sea by a rum runner off Block Island, as well as unidentified witnesses who reported seeing several men using lime to fill a shallow grave. Neither of these leads was investigated.

Over the next several years, police would often investigate unidentified murder victims in the hopes of finding Walsh. However, as it was reported by the press “any time a suspicious corpse was found – in the Massachusetts or Rhode Island woods – or a skull turned up in a fishing net off Block Island, police checked it against Danny Walsh’s dental records.” Despite efforts by law enforcement, Walsh's body was never recovered.

On December 10, 2016, State Police in Rhode Island began excavating Walsh's former property in Charlestown, Rhode Island. The property was given to the St. James Church next door but was sold to a developer in August 2016. In December 2016, the developer broke ground on the property and human remains were discovered. Archeologists have since largely denied that the remains belong to Danny Walsh or one of his victims, and the remains have instead been attributed to a 19th-century burial plot.

== See also ==
- List of kidnappings
- List of people who disappeared mysteriously (1910–1970)
