= McErlean =

McErlean is an Irish surname. Notable people with the surname include:

- Josh McErlean (born 1999), Irish rally driver
- Keith McErlean (born 1975), Irish actor

== See also ==
- McErlane
