= Max Hoff (mobster) =

American boxer and bootlegger (1892–1941)

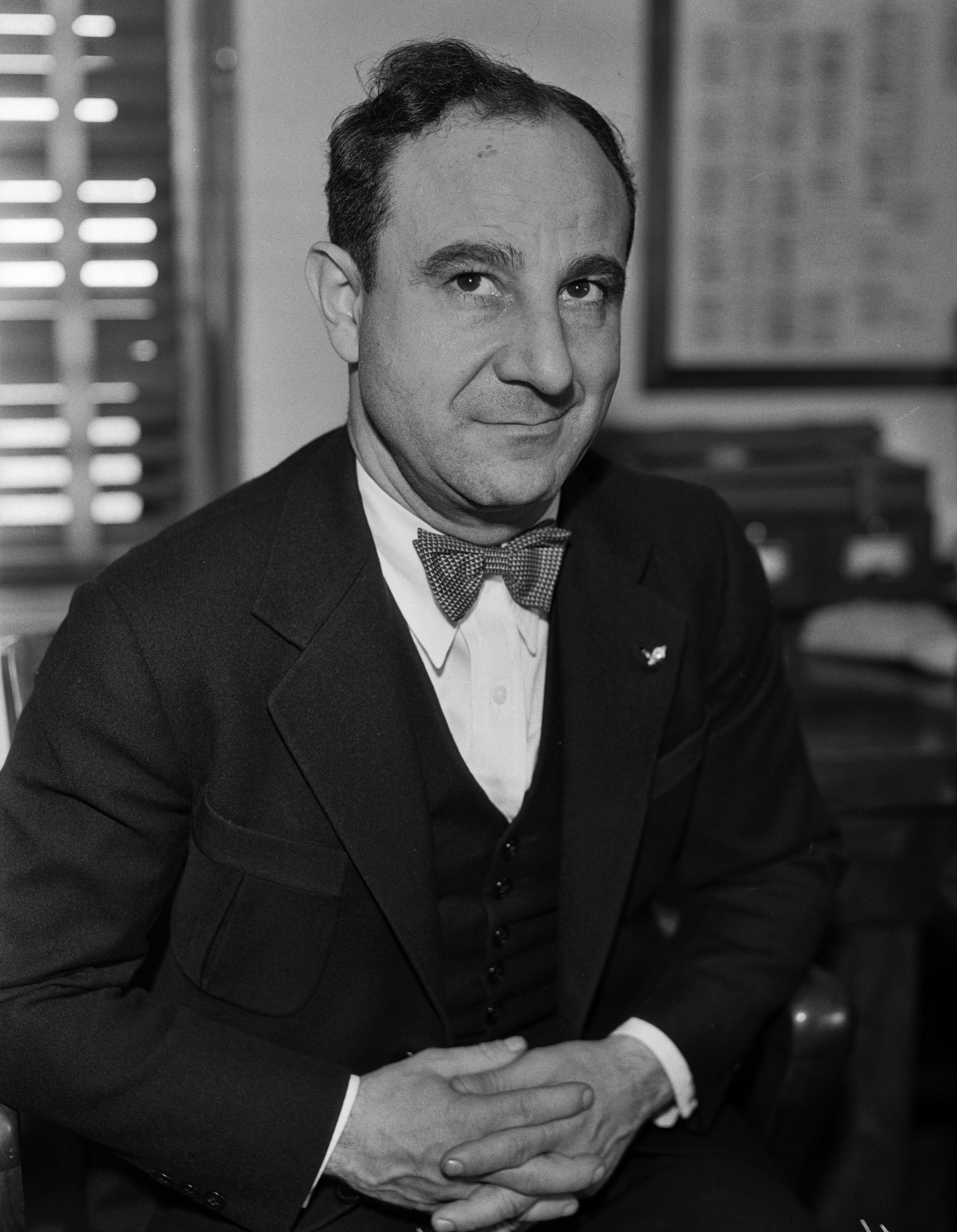
- Born: 1892; South Philadelphia, Pennsylvania, U.S.
- Died: April 27, 1941 (aged 48–49); West Philadelphia, Pennsylvania, U.S.
- Other names: Maxie, Boo Boo
- Occupations: Gangster, crime boss, gambler, boxer, bootlegger
- Spouse: Margaret Hoff (second wife)

Max "Boo Boo" Hoff (1892 – April 27, 1941) was an ex-boxer who later became a bootlegger and gambler.

== Early life ==
Hoff was born in Little Italy, Philadelphia, in 1892 to poor Russian Jewish immigrants. After quitting school, Hoff worked for many years in a cigar store where the service also included gambling. His pay was raised from $12 a week to $15 after his boss noticed how his amiable personality appealed to customers. In 1917, he started a gambling operation in the section of Philadelphia now known as Society Hill.

=== Boxing ===
In the late 1920s, Hoff had the largest stable of prizefighters in the nation, and he staged boxing matches for many years at several Philadelphia sites. None of his boxers won a world championship, but several were highly ranked contenders in a period when boxing was a popular form of entertainment. In 1928, his stable of boxers became Max Hoff Inc. His group was the first group of prize fighters to be incorporated.

In 1927, Hoff filed a $350,000 lawsuit against Gene Tunney and his manager, Billy Gibson. The suit was based on a disputed agreement, which Hoff claimed was signed by Tunney and Gibson the day before Tunney's first fight with the heavyweight champion, Jack Dempsey, in 1926. He said he loaned Tunney and Gibson $20,000 as an advance to bind an oral agreement. Tunney and Gibson claimed they needed money right away because they owed thousands of dollars to Tex Rickard, who promoted the fight and had loaned them money to cover training and other expenses. The deal called for Hoff to receive 20% of Tunney's championship fight earnings and to be joint-manager, with Gibson, in exchange for the loan. For unknown reasons, Hoff dropped the suit in 1931, despite his insistence that he had a strong case.

== Prohibition ==
When Prohibition took effect in 1919, Hoff expanded his business into bootlegging; just like most mobsters in Philadelphia including Mickey Duffy, Leo and Ignatius Lanzetta, and Salvatore Sabella.

Hoff's bootlegging operation included an office with 175 phones and a weekly payroll of $30,000. Illegal booze manufacturing and distribution operations were netting Hoff's syndicate an estimated $5 million yearly by the late 1920s.

Hoff became one of the richest gangsters in the United States. He hosted luxurious parties, where stars of the sports and entertainment worlds partied with his accomplices.

In 1929, Hoff attended the Atlantic City Conference, which was hosted by corrupt Atlantic County treasurer Enoch "Nucky" Johnson and headed by Charles "Lucky" Luciano and Johnny Torrio. The meeting took place at the Ritz-Carlton Hotel after new Jewish Mob boss Meyer Lansky's wedding in Atlantic City, New Jersey. At the conference, the two men discussed the future of organized crime and the future structure of the Mafia crime families. Other attendees included: Lansky and Benjamin "Bugsy" Siegel (The Bugs and Meyer Mob), Frank Costello (a member of the Masseria crime family), Abe Bernstein (The Purple Gang), Alphonse "Scarface" Capone (boss of Chicago's South Side Gang), Abner Zwillman (Newark crime boss), and Dutch Schultz (New York and Newark numbers rackets).

=== Investigation ===
Hoff was called to the stand eight times during a grand jury investigation along with 748 other witnesses who testified. Even though he denied to being a part of the bootlegging empires in Philadelphia, Philadelphia District Attorney John Monaghan nicknamed him the "King of Philadelphia's Bootleggers". Despite the great amount of evidence stacked against him, Hoff was never indicted during the trials, because (according to a New York Times reporter) Hoff "had scrupulously avoided signing any documents connected to the undercover operations".

A few details that were revealed during the investigation: Hoff and his accomplices set up the Franklin Mortgage and Investment Company to front for several industrial alcohol companies they took over and operated. In a three-month-period, 350,000 gallons of bootlegged alcohol were transported from the Publicker plant in Little Italy by the Reading Railroad in large oil drums marked "tar" or "asphaltum," to one of the alcohol companies under the syndicate's control. After the alcohol was processed, it was placed in bottles and labeled as "hair oil" or "perfume".

Hoff's association with the Union Bank and Trust Company gave him the ability to finance the bootleg syndicate via a $10 million money-laundering plan. Normal banking procedures were bypassed, allowing him to open fourteen accounts, using the names of dead people or just fake names. The bank's president was forced to resign after it was determined that he had served as the fake owner of several blocks of Atlantic City real estate, worth millions of dollars, which were bought by Hoff and his associates.

To ensure the delivery of booze to brothels, bars and restaurants, members of the Philadelphia Police Department were paid off by bootleggers and speakeasy owners. It was estimated that the bribes paid to cops by bar owners totaled $2 million a year. Of the 87 officers questioned, many of them were fired or resigned because they couldn't explain such increases in their bank accounts and real estate and stock holdings.

The owner of Military Sales Company, Edward S. Goldberg, admitted that he sold submachine guns and bulletproof vests to Hoff. During one raid, about 450 machine guns were discovered in the I Goldberg store basement in Philadelphia. In 1929, the New York City Police Department complained that most of their confiscated guns were bought in Philadelphia.

The $500,000 worth of European liquor and champagne seized in a raid on a barge near Mount Holly, New Jersey was traced back to Hoff's gang.

=== Bad times ===
After Prohibition was repealed in 1933, Hoff's luck began to run out. The IRS sued Hoff for $21,000 in unpaid income taxes; in which his home in Cobbs Creek Park was sold by the sheriff for $1,200 and his car was sold for $240. Hoff was arrested in Philadelphia's 30th Street Station for allegedly attempting to pass a counterfeit $20 bill. Bad luck forced Hoff to sell his last entertainment venture, an ice cream shop called the Village Barn, near the University of Pennsylvania campus.

== Death ==
Hoff's body was found on April 27, 1941, by his second wife, Margaret. The autopsy showed the cause of death as a heart ailment.

== See also ==
- Jewish-American organized crime
