= David Packer (artist) =

American artist

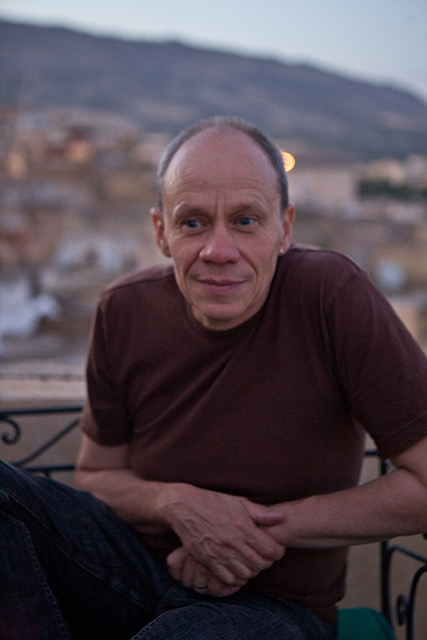
- David Packer
- Born: January 2, 1960 (age 66); Amersham, England
- Occupation: Artist
- Website: packerdavid.com

David Packer (born January 2, 1960), is an English artist based in New York. He works in a variety of media: sculpture, drawing, and artist books.

== Content and media ==
As a sculptor, Packer works primarily in ceramics, and has been described “as a master practitioner of architectural and technical ceramics”; however, he also has used found lumber and discarded industrial metal. often with “redundant technology imaging redundant industry.”

Bears that Dance, Ceramic, 44 x 34 x 28", 2010

== Exhibitions and residencies ==
Packer has exhibited in New York City at Garth Clark Gallery in 2002, where he also had three other group shows, and in the group show, Exit Biennial II, Traffic, at Exit Art, 2005, curated by Papo Colo and Jeanette Ingberman.

In 2006, during a three-month residency at the Kohler Arts/Industry program, Packer began a project creating full-size cast ceramic sculptures of V8 car engines, called The Last of the V8s. These sculptures were also included in the show The Moment at Hand at the John Michael Kohler Arts Center, as well as subsequently in galleries in New York, Chicago, and Seattle.

The Last of the V8s, Cast Ceramic with Auto Paint, 21 x 40 x 28" each, 2006

== Collections and curating ==
Packer’s work is included in the public collections of the Carnegie Museum of Art, the John Michael Kohler Arts Center, and the Museum of Art and Design.

== Travel and other projects ==
The first time Packer was a Fulbright Scholar to Morocco, in Fez in 2011, after three exhibitions of his own work there, he wrote a book on the diversity of Moroccan ceramics. The Earth has Three Colors: a celebration of Moroccan ceramics/ That same year, he received a Core Fulbright Scholar award to Morocco to continue research and promote his book.

== Biography, education, and teaching ==
Packer was born in Amersham, England in 1960 and has lived in the United States since 1983, including Washington DC, Miami, Tallahassee and, since 1994, New York City. He is a dual British and American citizen and currently maintains a studio in Long Island City.

Art school in the United Kingdom included Buckinghamshire College of Further Education (1979–80) and Bristol School of Art (1980-83) where Packer received a BFA in ceramics. He finished his formal education in the United States at Florida State University, graduating with an MFA in Studio Art in 1994.

Packer has taught ceramics, including tile making and wheel throwing, drawing, and computer art: schools include Greenwich House Pottery, the Crafts Students League, both in New York City, and Western Carolina University, including the graduate program.

Packer met his wife, artist Margaret Lanzetta, at Exit Art in 1995.
