= Ignatius Lanzetta =

American drug trafficker

- Born: July 12, 1903; Ward 3, South Philadelphia, Philadelphia, Pennsylvania
- Died: after 1960; Detroit, Michigan, United States
- Other names: Frank Pius, Ignatius Lanzetti
- Occupations: Gangster, crime boss, bootlegger, dope peddler
- Spouse: May Siano
- Children: Warren and Vanna Lanzetta
- Parent(s): Ignatius and Michele Lanzetta
- Criminal charges: Breaking New Jersey's "Gangster Law"
- Penalty: 5-10 years imprisonment; released in 1940

Ignatius Andrew "Frank Pius" Lanzetta (July 12, 1903 – after 1960) was an American criminal and member of the Lanzetta Brothers gang, who ran bootlegging, drug trafficking, and bookmaking operations. He and his brothers were often incorrectly called the Lanzetti brothers.

== Early life ==
Ignatius Lanzetta was born in South Philadelphia to Italian immigrant parents Ignatius Andrea Lanzetta, a liquor dealer from Roseto Valfortore, and Michelina Luisi from Castelluccio Valmaggiore. Ignatius had five other brothers: Leo, Pius, Willie, Teo, and Lucien; Leo being the oldest and Pius being the second oldest. Ignatius was known to be very handsome and an impeccable dresser.

== Prohibition ==
His oldest brother Leo formed the Lanzetta Gang with Ignatius and their other brothers in the early 1920s. Ignatius, Leo, and another brother Pius ran the gang. The brothers controlled bootlegging in Little Italy.

They were allied with Italian gangsters Michael Falcone and Louis "Fats" Delrossi and their rivals included: Polish mob boss William Michael Cusick, Sicilian Mafia and Bruno crime family boss Salvatore Sabella, Jewish mob boss Max "Boo Boo" Hoff, and Italian Mafia made man and rival dope peddler and bootlegger Joseph Bruno.

The Lanzetta brothers ran their gang with extreme violence and expanded into drug trafficking and numbers writing.

== Family trouble ==
Leo and Ignatius killed rival Joe Bruno on August 18, 1925, at 8th and Catherine Streets. Four days later, as Leo left a barber shop at 7th and Bainbridge Streets, an unknown assailant killed him in retaliation for Bruno's murder. Sabella was Leo's suspected killer.

Pius was killed in a luncheonette on December 31, 1936 at 726 South Eighth Street.

Willie was found with his head in a burlap bag with a bullet in his brain on July 2, 1939.

Teo was convicted on drug trafficking charges in 1940 and sent to Leavenworth Prison.

=== Conviction ===
Along with Delrossi and Falcone, Ignatius was sent to prison in 1936 for breaking New Jersey's "Gangster Law" and released in 1940. They served only four years even though their sentences were "not more than 10 years and not less than 5 years of imprisonment...".

== Later life ==
Ignatius married an Italian named May Siano. They had a son, Warren, and a daughter, Vanna. They divorced in 1942, two years after he was released from prison.

Along with his brother Lucien and their mother, he moved to Detroit, Michigan, where he worked in the auto industry. He married Arlene Kramer Walbeck in a Lutheran ceremony in 1945. They divorced in 1960 in Florida.

== Boardwalk Empire ==
In the first season of the HBO series Boardwalk Empire, Ignatius Lanzetta and his brothers are the inspiration for Nucky Thompson's main rivals the D'Alessio brothers. In the series, Ignatius is the inspiration for Ignacious D'Alessio, the co-leader of the D'Alessio gang. In the series, his brothers are: Leo, Matteo, Lucien, Sixtus, Pius, and another brother in Philadelphia who is a dentist; the brothers also have several more sisters. In the last episode of season one, Ignacious and Pius are killed by freelance killer Richard Harrow with a sawed-off shotgun in November 1920.
