= Crime in Poland =

- Homicide: 0.7 (2024)
- Assault: 13.3 (2023)
- Burglary: 148.5 (2024)
- Theft: 236.8 (2024)
- Fraud: 447.6 (2024)
- Corruption: 9.3 (2024)
- Bribery: 4.9 (2024)
- Money laundering: 3.9 (2024)
- Rape: 1.3 (2023)
- Sexual violence: 9.1 (2023)
- reported per 100,000 inhabitants

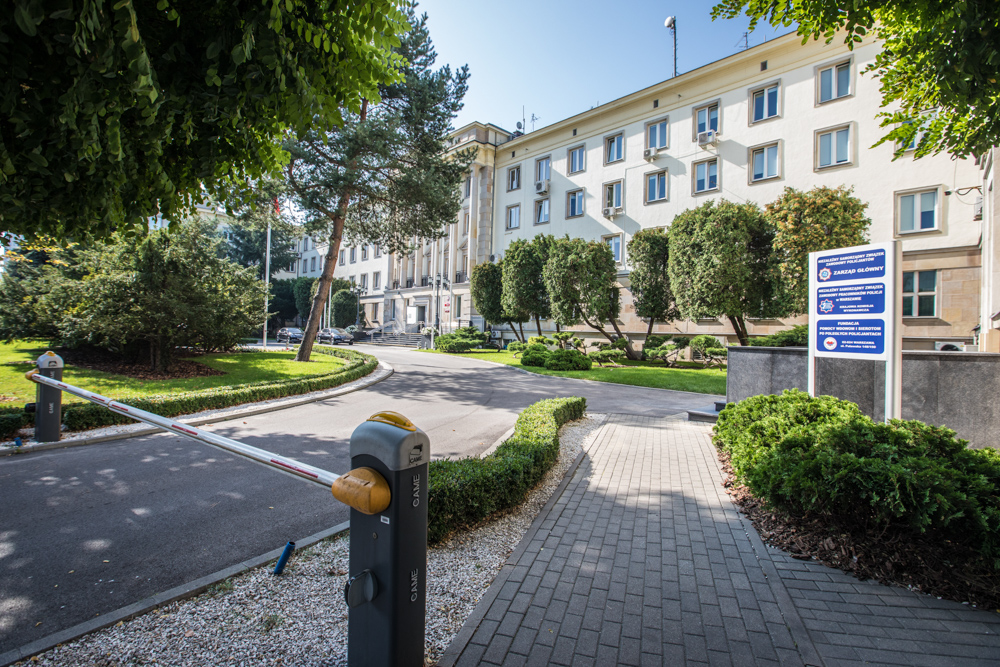
National Police Headquarters in Warsaw

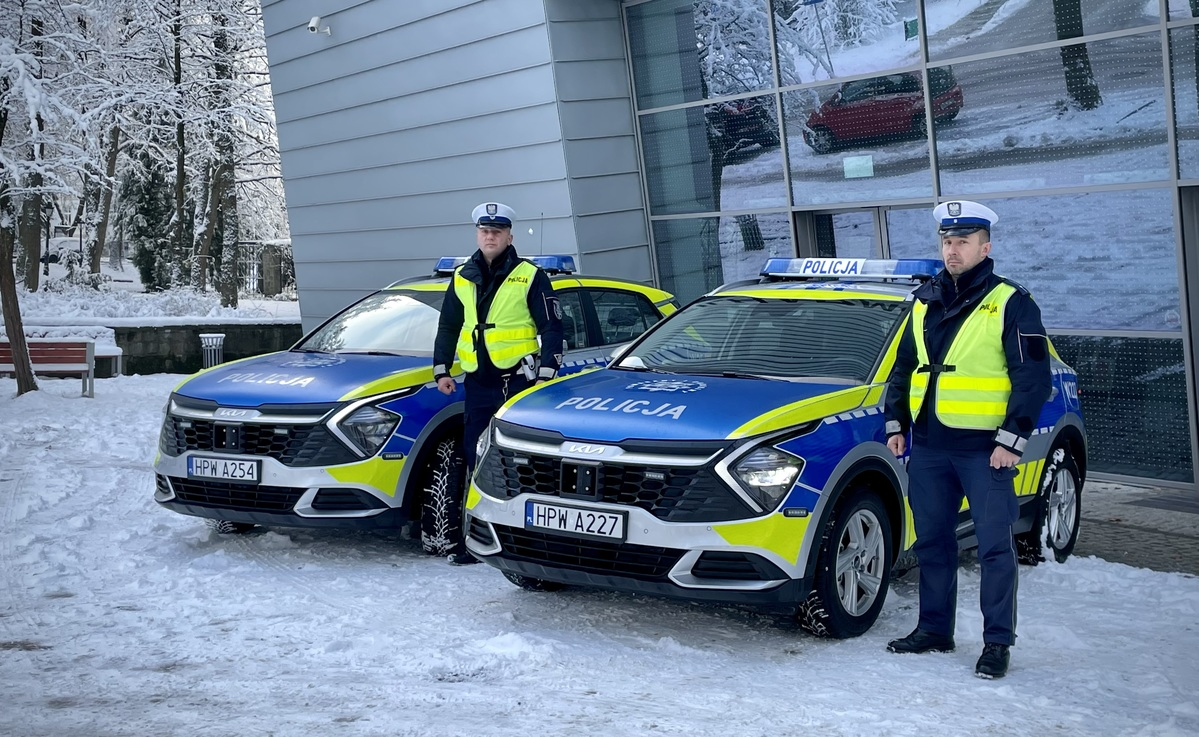
Polish police officers and vehicles

Crime in Poland refers to the incidence, deterrence, and handling of criminal activity in the Republic of Poland by Polish law enforcement agencies charged with ensuring public safety and maintaining order. Poland ranks favorably in terms of public safety, with one of the lowest homicide rates in Europe. Poland was ranked 25th in the 2022 Global Peace Index and scored 0.0 on the 2023 Global Terrorism Index.

== Crime by type ==
=== Murder ===
In 2022, Poland's homicide rate was 0.68 per 100,000, with a total of 270 murders committed. The murder rate has remained relatively stable since 2014, when it was 0.74 per 100,000, with a total of 287 murders committed. The highest recorded homicide rate in the modern history of Poland was 2.39 per 100,000 in 1994, still during the democratic consolidation period following the 1989 fall of communism, which put an end to the Polish People's Republic and started the democratic transition.

=== Sexual violence ===
According to UNODC data, the rape rate in Poland was 1.29 per 100,000 in 2023, which is one of the lowest reported rates globally, and down from 1.72 per 100,000 in 2015. Meanwhile, the median annual sexual assault rate was 0.94 per 100,000 people during the latest five-year period from 2019 to 2023.

The Eurostat and FRA European Survey on Gender-Based Violence (EU-GBV), which uses a standardized methodology suitable for cross-national statistical comparisons to measure personal victimization, found that the lifetime prevalence of rape among women in Poland is 2.3 times lower than the EU average.

The European Institute for Gender Equality (EIGE) reports that the prevalence of gender-based violence (including physical violence, sexual violence, and threats) is 16.7% in Poland, among the lowest in the EU and below the EU-27 average of 30.7%.

OECD indicators show that Poland is tied for the lowest reported rates of lifetime intimate partner violence, at 13%, which is well below the OECD average of 23%.

=== Organized crime ===
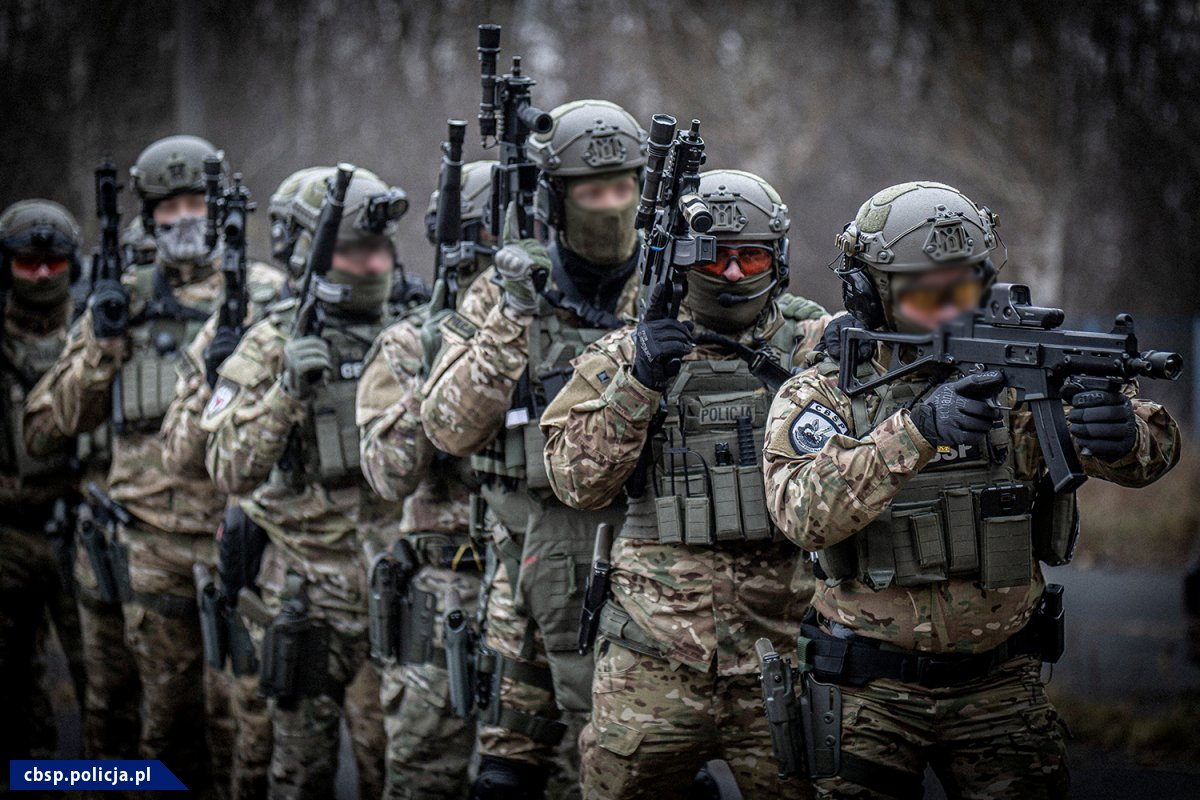
The Central Investigation Bureau of Police during a training mission

The Central Investigation Bureau of Police (pol. Centralne Biuro Śledcze Policji, CBŚP) is the law enforcement unit of the Polish Police responsible for fighting organized crime.

The most well-known of the Polish organized crime groups in the 1990s were the so-called Pruszków and Wołomin gangs.

Polish organized crime emerged in the 1990s when the traditional criminal underworld became better organised due to rising corruption. Organized crime groups were well known (1992) for operating sophisticated car theft-rings, as well as for their involvement in drug trafficking (the main drug being amphetamine) and weapon trafficking.

The Pruszków mafia was an organized criminal group that emerged from the Warsaw suburb of Pruszków at the beginning of the 1990s. The group is known for being involved in large car-theft rings, drug trafficking (including cocaine, heroin, hashish and amphetamine), kidnapping, extortion, weapon trafficking (including AK-47's) and murder. Even though law enforcement dealt a severe blow to the Pruszków mafia, it is alleged that Pruszków-based gangs, with or without notice from their former leaders, have regained their strength in recent years and have begun setting up their car-theft rings and connections with Colombian drug cartels again.

A similar organized crime group known as the Wołomin mafia from Wołomin near Warsaw, with whom they fought bloody turf wars, was crushed by the Polish police in cooperation with the German police in a raid on a highway between Konin and Poznan in September 2011.

Logo of the Central Anticorruption Bureau

=== Corruption ===
According to the Corruption Perception Index for 2015, Poland was ranked as the 29th country with the least perceived corruption out of 168 countries assessed. It is the eleventh successive year in which Poland's score and ranking has improved in the Index.

The law enforcement agency responsible for combating corruption within Poland's public sector is the Central Anticorruption Bureau (Polish: Centralne Biuro Antykorupcyjne).

== Polish cities most affected by crime ==
Polish cities most affected by crime, 2006.
#	City	Number of crimes per 100,000 inhabitants
1.	Sobótka	7063,7
2.	Chorzów	6733,3
3.	Legnica	6361,5
4.	Kalisz	6228,2
5.	Gdańsk	6133,7
6.	Poznań	6109,2
7.	Wrocław	5983,4
8.	Kraków	5974,2
9.	Kielce	5926,6
10.	Gliwice	5733,5
11.	Opole	5649,8
12.	Włocławek	5626,9
13.	Warsaw	5353,2
14.	Bytom	5332,5
15.	Elbląg	5328,1
16.	Zielona Góra	5193,2
17.	Tarnów	5187,3
18.	Gorzów Wielkopolski	5156,6
19.	Szczecin	5120,9
20.	Toruń	5120,2
21.	Łódź	5116,4
22.	Sosnowiec	5051,7
23.	Bielsko-Biała	4969,1
24.	Lublin	4968,7
25.	Zabrze	4808,8
26.	Wałbrzych	4710,2
27.	Dąbrowa Górnicza	4690,8
28.	Radom	4670,1
29.	Bydgoszcz	4515,1
30.	Rybnik	4500,7
31.	Gdynia	4328,1
32.	Olsztyn	4317
33.	Koszalin	4004,7
34.	Ruda Śląska	3945,3
35.	Rzeszów	3890,9
36.	Tychy	3842,7
37.	Częstochowa	3786,5
38.	Płock	3262,5
39.	Białystok	2977

== Crime dynamics ==
While local organized crime in Poland existed during the interwar period, it has mostly developed since the fall of communism (late 1980s/1990s) with the introduction of free market system in Poland and the lessening of the police (milicja) power.

Crime in Poland is lower than in many countries of Europe.

Newer studies (2009) report that the crime victimisation rate in Poland is constantly decreasing, and in 2008 Poland was at a low end of 25 among the 36 European countries listed. A 2004 report on security concerns of European Union residents indicated that the Polish public (along with that of Greece) are the most afraid of crime, a finding which does not correlate with the actual crime threat.

== See also ==
- Football hooliganism in Poland
- Polish Mob (in United States)
