= Katzenberg Hillfort =

Archaeological site in Rhineland-Palatinate, Germany

Coordinates: 50°19′12″N 7°14′38″E

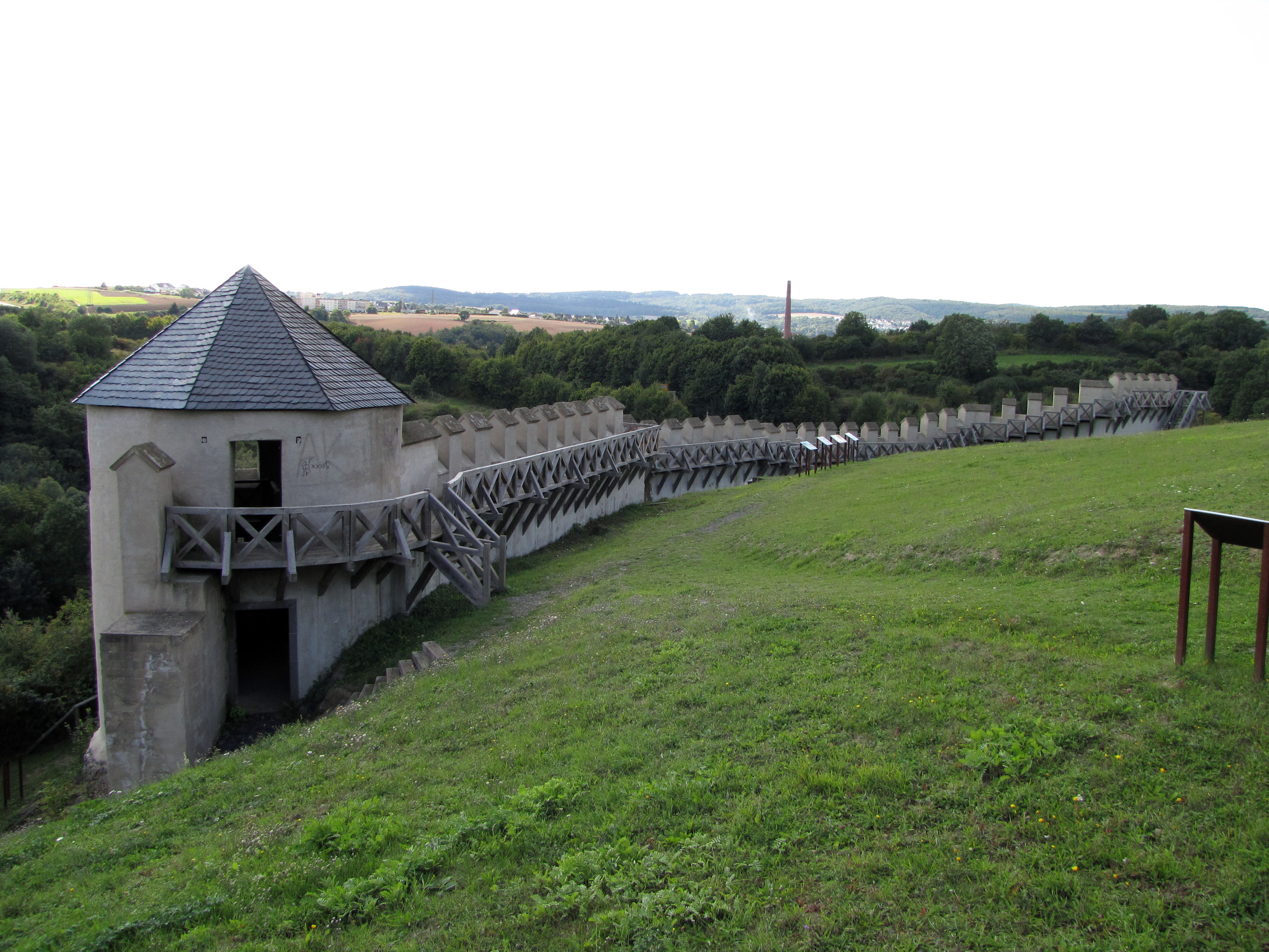
Reconstruction of parts of the defensive wall of the Late Roman hillfort of Katzenberg near Mayen

Katzenberg Hillfort (German: Spätrömische Höhenbefestigung Katzenberg or Römerwarte Mayen) is a Roman refuge fort near Mayen in Germany dating to the 4th century.

The fortification on the Katzenberg hill was built around 300 AD after the Roman limes had been overrun and Germanic tribes had invaded and plundered the Roman Empire (the so-called Limesfall). The inhabitants of the Roman vicus, which was located on the site of the present-day town of Mayen, could escape to the fort in time of danger. At that time, town walls were built around the provincial capitals of Trier, Cologne and Mainz, as well as around smaller places like Koblenz or Andernach. The Katzenberg was the largest of about 60 Late Roman hillforts which were constructed in the Eifel and Hunsrück regions. They were used for about 70 years and then, after a 30-year pause, used again, in some cases until about 450 AD. On the uppermost crest of the hill is a small military outpost, the lower-lying open areas were probably used by the civilian population in the event of a threat. The fort covered an area of 1.2 hectares.

The remains of the Late Roman hillfort were discovered around 1900 and excavated for the first time between 1907 and 1932. After a long pause, excavations were re-started in 1997 as part of the Volcano Park project. The finds were archaeologically investigated in Koblenz and the town of Mayen under the direction of the state office for cultural heritage.

For the history of handicrafts the roofing finds were especially important. The roof slates found in the round towers were, surprisingly, shaped like scales, something which was rare in Roman times.

In 2000, parts of the defensive wall and two round towers were reconstructed on original foundations of the walls. On the remains of the old military station on the hilltop, which had underfloor heating in the form of a hypocaust, a protective structure was built. All roofs were covered in slates in the form of scales and hexagons (for protection).

== Literature ==
- Angelika Hunold: Die Befestigung auf dem Katzenberg bei Mayen und die spätrömischen Höhenbefestungen in Nordgallien. Monographien des Römisch-Germanischen Zentralmuseums, Schnell und Steiner, Mainz, 2011, ISBN 9783795424251.
- Angelika Hunold, Alwin Punstein, H. Wolfgang Wagner & Franz Wierschem:Rekonstruktion der römischen Moselschiefer-Dächer auf dem Katzenberg bei Mayen/Eifel und weitere Beiträge zur über 2000-jährigen Handwerks- und Bergbaugeschichte des Schiefers. Der Anschnitt, 56, 2004, H.1: 27 - 34, 10 ill., 1st map, 2 tab., Bochum, 2004.
- Ewald Hoppen, Angelika Hunold & H. Wolfgang Wagner: Römerwarte - Abschluss einer Rekonstruktion zur Handwerks- und Bergbaugeschichte auf dem Katzenberg bei Mayen. Der Anschnitt, 57, 2005, H. 4: 169 - 171, 4 ill., 1 tab., Bochum, 2005.
- H. Wolfgang Wagner & Wolfgang Schultheis: Römischer Dachschiefer – Neue Funde und neue Erkenntnisse. In: Der Anschnitt. Vol. 63, Bochum 2011, pp. 202–206.
