= Frank McErlane =

Irish-American gangster (1894–1932)

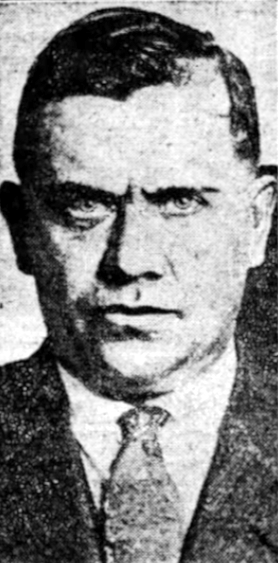
- Born: February 1894; Chicago, Illinois, U.S.
- Died: October 8, 1932 (aged 38); Beardstown, Illinois, U.S.
- Resting place: Holy Sepulchre Cemetery; 41.688931°N 87.771089°W
- Other name: Madman McErlane
- Occupation: Mobster

Frank McErlane (February 1894 – October 8, 1932) was a Prohibition-era Irish-American organized crime figure. He led the Saltis-McErlane Gang, allied with Rusyn American gangster Joseph Saltis and the Johnny Torrio-Al Capone led Chicago Outfit, against rival Irish-American bootleggers, the Southside O'Donnell Gang. He is credited with introducing the Thompson submachine gun to Chicago's underworld. The Illinois Crime Survey called him "the most brutal gunman who ever pulled a trigger in Chicago."

== Biography ==
Born in Chicago, Illinois, Frank McErlane was first arrested in 1911, aged 17, and sent to Pontiac Prison in June 1913 for involvement in a car theft ring. Released on parole in March 1916, he was arrested eight months later as an accessory in the murder of Oak Park police officer Herman J. Malow Jr. Sent to Joliet Prison for one year, he attempted to escape but was caught and spent another two years in prison.

Shortly after the start of Prohibition, McErlane began running a gang with partner Joseph "Polack Joe" Saltis, operating in the "Back of the Yards" section of the South Side. In 1922, McErlane and Saltis allied with the Johnny "The Fox" Torrio-Al Capone Chicago Outfit against the Southside O'Donnell Brothers. McErlane was known as an especially ferocious assassin. Standing 5'8" and weighing 190 pounds, he was described as looking like a "butter and egg man". McErlane carried a rosary in his pockets along with a pistol. Frank was known to drink too much of what he sold and frequently slip into alcoholic psychosis. McErlane's face would grow redder with each drink, sending apprehension throughout his toughest criminal associates.

During the 1923 "Beer Wars", McErlane would be credited with killing three O'Donnell gangsters in September of that year; Jerry O'Conner, George Bucher, and George Meegan. On December 1, 1923, two O'Donnell beer trucks were waylayed on the road between Chicago and Joliet. The occupants of one, William "Shorty" Egan and Thomas "Morrie" Keane, were shoved into a car with Frank McErlane and Willie Channell, who drove. Egan miraculously survived what happened next and gave this chilling account;

Pretty soon the driver asks the guy with the shotgun, 'Where you gonna get rid of these guys?' The fat fellow laughs and says, 'I'll take care of that in a minute.' He was monkeying with his shotgun all the time. Pretty soon he turns around and points the gun at Keane. He didn't say a word but just let go straight at him. Keane got it square on the left side. It kind of turned him over and the fat guy give him the second barrel in the other side. The guy loads up his gun and gives it to Keane again. Then he turns to me and says, 'I guess you might as well get yours too.' With that he shoots me in the side. It hurt like hell so when I seen him loading up again, I twist around so it won't hurt me in the same place. This time he got me in the leg. Then he gimme the other barrel right on the puss. I slide off the seat. But I guess the fat guy wasn't sure we was through. He let Morrie have it twice more and then let me have it again in the other side. The fat guy scrambled into the rear seat and grabbed Keane. He opens the door and kicks Morrie out onto the road. We was doing 50 from the sound. I figure I'm next so when he drags me over to the door I set myself to jump. He shoves and I light in the ditch by the road. I hit the ground on my shoulders and I thought I would never stop rolling. I lost consciousness. When my senses came back, I was lying in a pool of water and ice had formed around me. The sky was red and it was breaking day. I staggered along the road until I saw a light in a farmhouse…

Despite having nearly half his face blown off, Egan had amazingly lived to tell about his "one-way ride" and fingered Willie Channell as one of his attackers. McErlane was eventually arrested but he beat both this case and charges in the double homicide of George Bucher and George Meegan, who were riddled with bullets while driving home on September 17, 1923.

McErlane's behavior only got worse. On May 4, 1924, he was drinking in a Crown Point, Indiana saloon with two friends, John O'Reilly and Alex McCabe. Both men egged Frank into demonstrating his marksmanship abilities. McErlane picked a random target at the end of the bar, attorney Thaddeus S. Fancher, and killed him with a single pistol shot to the head. O'Reilly would eventually be convicted of the murder and sentenced to life imprisonment. McCabe got a life sentence as well, but later won his freedom on appeal after the chief witness against him was bludgeoned to death. Differing accounts of the murder of Fancher exist.

By 1925, rival gang boss Spike O'Donnell had reinforced his gang and once again instigated a war with the Saltis-McErlane mob, who also found themselves in conflict with the Sheldon Gang as well. That summer, all the major South Side gang began shooting each other. Frank McErlane was a prime suspect in the July 23 murder of George Karl and the September 3 killing of William Dickman. McErlane was not charged; indeed, he was about to make history.

Some crime historians believe McErlane acquired his "Tommy Gun" from North Side gang leader Dean O'Banion, who had purchased a shipment of submachine guns in Denver, Colorado shortly before his November 1924 murder. At any rate, McErlane was to use one in his next attempt to kill Spike O'Donnell (one of ten recorded attacks on O'Donnell's life). On September 25, 1925, O'Donnell was talking to a beat cop in front of a drugstore at Sixty-Third and Western streets. A car pulled up and someone yelled, "Hello, Spike!" The gang boss saw what was coming and hit the deck; a submachine gun began drumming from the car, stitching neat lines of bullet holes on the storefront before the would-be killers sped away. Police were so unfamiliar with the Thompson, they thought that either shotguns or a "machine rifle of some kind" had done the damage. It was the first recorded use of a submachine gun in Chicago (or any other major American city, for that matter).

Several days later, on October 3, McErlane used his Thompson to shoot up the Ragen's Colts clubhouse, killing a Sheldon gangster named Charles Kelly. He was also suspected of shooting up Martin "Buff" Costello's bar on February 10, 1926, wounding Sheldon gangsters William Wilson and John "Mitters" Foley. Newspaper headlines read "MACHINE GUN GANG SHOOTS 2". Both Chicago Police Captain John Stege and gangster Al Capone commented on the power of the submachine gun; both of their respective organizations set out to arm themselves with the formidable weapon. The age of the Tommy Gun had arrived.

On April 22, 1926, McErlane was finally arrested for the murder of Thaddeus Fancher. He wouldn't be extradited to Indiana until August of that year. McErlane was noted for showing up for one court appearance drunk; the jailer leading him was equally intoxicated. On November 3, 1927, (after the murder of at least one witness and much changed testimony), McErlane would be acquitted of Fancher's murder. At the 1920s closed, Joe Saltis was acquitted of the murder of John "Mitters" Foley and eventually moved to Wisconsin.

McErlane pretty much kept out of sight until January 28, 1930, when he was rushed to the hospital after being shot in the left leg; the bullet had struck above the knee and fractured the leg. Frank claimed that he had accidentally shot himself while cleaning a revolver, but police suspected that his common-law wife Elfrieda Rigus, aka Marion Miller, may have shot him. They had quite a stormy relationship and often had high-decibel, alcohol-fueled fights. Another possible suspect was Polish-American organized crime figure John "Dingbat" Oberta (sometimes spelled "O'Berta"), with whom McErlane had been feuding over an alleged debt collection. On the night of February 24, McErlane was propped up his hospital bed with his healing leg still in traction when two or three gunmen barged in and opened fire. Frank yanked an automatic from under his pillow and returned their fire. While his shots missed, they scared his assailants off; one of them dropped a .45 automatic in his flight. McErlane had been winged three times in the melee and shrugged off questions as to who shot him. Frank said cryptically, "I'll take care of it." Just after McErlane was released from the hospital, on March 5, Oberta was found shot to death in his car on the outskirts of Chicago. The dead body of Oberta's driver, Sam Malaga, lay face down in an icy puddle of water some feet away. The .45 left in McErlane's hospital room had been traced to Malaga. Frank had, indeed, "taken care of it".

McErlane's behavior continued to worsen. Years of alcoholism had taken its toll on Frank's mental state. On June 8, 1931, an intoxicated McErlane swept a South Shore Drive block with shotgun blasts, shooting at imaginary foes. Police ultimately filed a total of five simultaneous charges; drunk and disorderly, carrying a concealed weapon, firing a shotgun indiscriminately around his neighborhood, driving with forged license plates, and biting his sister on the cheek.

On October 8, 1931, McErlane was driving his car with common-law wife Elfrieda Rigus and her two German Shepherds in the back seat. Police later determined that both were extremely drunk and arguing with each other. At one point, Frank finally snapped. After pulling over in front of 8129 Phillips Avenue, McErlane whirled around and fired four fatal bullets into Elfrieda. Tired of the yapping dogs, Frank shot and killed them as well.

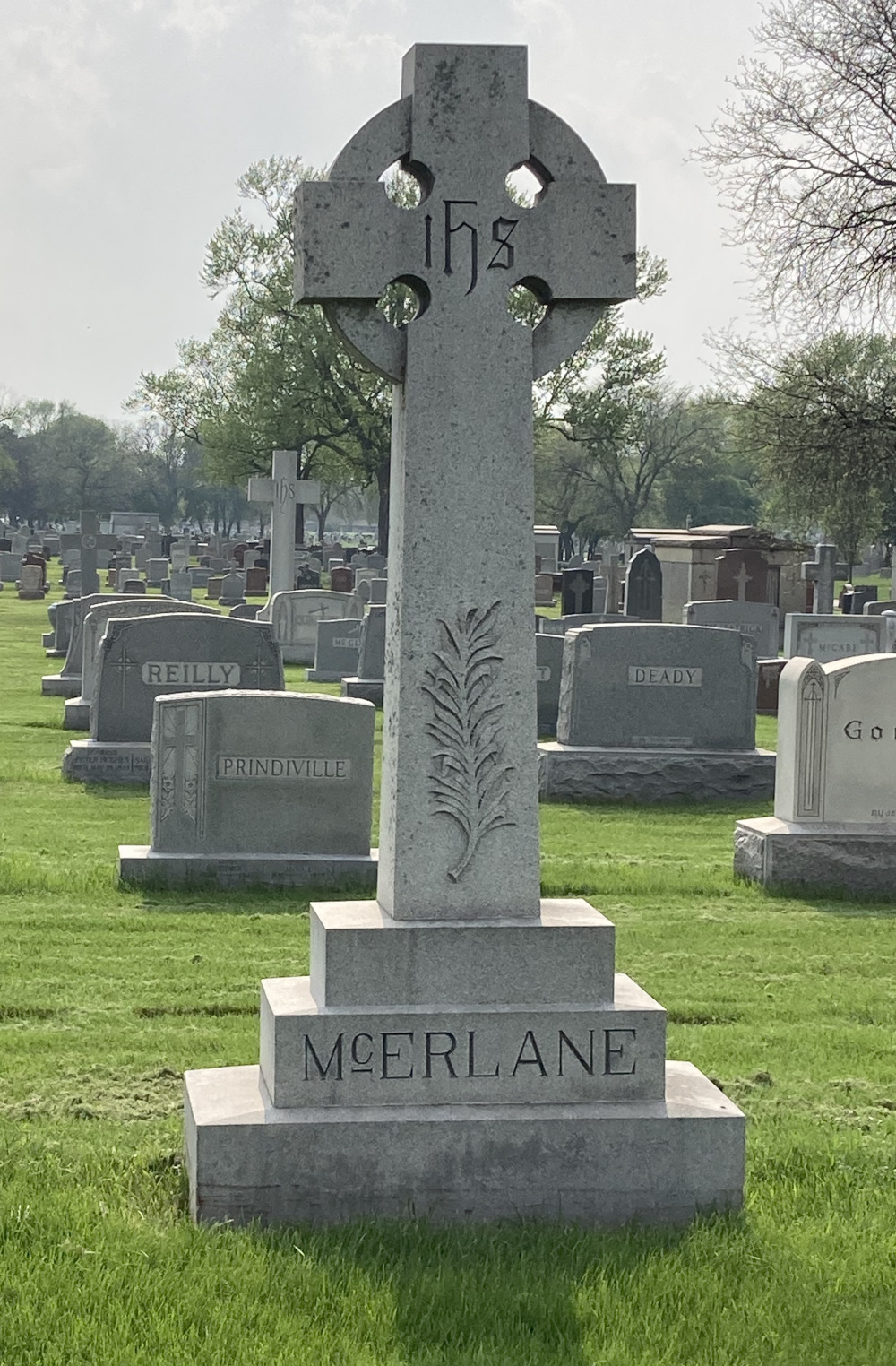
McErlane's grave at Holy Sepulchre Cemetery

After this episode, McErlane's remaining underworld associates raised a "retirement fund" of several hundred dollars in order to get rid of the dangerously unstable gunman. Frank thus retired to a lavishly furnished houseboat located on the Illinois River in Beardstown, Illinois.

In the fall of 1932, Frank fell ill with pneumonia. In his delirium, he was convinced that rival gangsters were coming to his hospital room to kill him; it took four attendants to hold him down in his rage. Frank McErlane died at the age of 38 on October 8, 1932, a year to the day after he killed Elfrieda Rigus. He was buried at Holy Sepulchre Cemetery in Alsip, Illinois.

After his death, a reporter interviewed one of Frank McErlane's former associates, who had only this to say, "I don't remember that he ever did anything good in his life. I don't believe he had a friend left."

== Sources ==
- English, T.J. Paddy Whacked: The Untold Story of the Irish American Gangster. New York: HarperCollins, 2005. ISBN 0-06-059002-5
- Kelly, Robert J. Encyclopedia of Organized Crime in the United States. Westport, Connecticut: Greenwood Press, 2000. ISBN 0-313-30653-2
- Sifakis, Carl. The Mafia Encyclopedia. New York: Da Capo Press, 2005. ISBN 0-8160-5694-3
- Sifakis, Carl. The Encyclopedia of American Crime. New York: Facts on File Inc., 2001. ISBN 0-8160-4040-0
