= Frank Erickson =

American mobster and bookmaker (1896-1968)

- Born: 1896; New York City, U.S.
- Died: March 2, 1968 (aged 71–72)

Frank Erickson (1896 – March 2, 1968) was an American mobster and bookmaker, known for his association with businessman, gambler and racketeer, Arnold Rothstein.

== Biography ==
He was born in New York City to parents of Swedish and Irish descent. After the death of his father, he grew up in an orphanage.

Frank Erickson was Arnold Rothstein's right-hand man and New York's largest bookmaker during the 1930s and 40s. Eventually, Erickson became very well known among bookmakers nationwide for handling "lay-off" bets. With Chicago's Moses Annenberg, Erickson developed a country wide wire service, making possible for the first time nationwide synchronized betting. Erickson never saw any of these profits because soon after, bookmaking became illegal and the government took over. In Robert Lacey's book on Meyer Lanksy, Erickson was named "the largest book maker on the East Coast, if not in all America." Additionally, it is a little-known fact that many of Erickson's profits went to charity. Along with many other ventures, he was a major contributor to the construction of a children's hospital in NYC. He allegedly had connections with the mob.

He died on March 2, 1968, from cardiac arrest while undergoing surgery on a bleeding ulcer.

== Brushes with the Law ==
Between the years of 1919 to 1926 Erickson was arrested five times for gambling only to have the charges dismissed each time. He was arrested again in 1939 for vagrancy and was so insulted by the charge, he arrived to court in an armoured car, escorted by Brink's guards. He showed the presiding body securities worth $125,000 to prove he wasn't a vagrant. That case, too, was dismissed. Erickson served 10 months on Riker's Island after eventually being convicted by District Attorney Frank Hogan.
