= John Finiello =

John Gilbert Finiello (1885 – September 19, 1930) was an agent of the Bureau of Prohibition who was killed during a September 19, 1930 raid on the Rising Sun brewery in Elizabeth, New Jersey. Born in Italy, Finiello was a naturalized immigrant and decorated veteran of World War I who had a reputation for honesty and courage. He had previously turned over a $10,000 bribe intended to avert a raid on another distillery. When he was recognized during the raid he was shot by at least eight gunmen.
