= Dena Katzenberg =

Dena Katzenberg (October 29, 1922 – November 25, 2000) was the longtime textile curator at the Baltimore Museum of Art and is noted for her scholarship on Baltimore album quilts.

== Early life ==
Dena Katzenberg was born in Baltimore. Enthralled by color and its unconventional applications, Katzenberg often visited the color laboratory at the Farboil Paint Company, owned by her father, which manufactured paint for the maritime industry. After graduating from Forest Park High School, Johns Hopkins University, and the New York School of Design, she headed the interior design studio at the May Company later called Hecht Co.

== Museum Curator ==
In the 1970s, Dena Katzenberg joined the Baltimore Museum of Art (BMA) as the institution’s consulting textile curator. Katzenberg organized numerous exhibitions during her tenure including the multi-disciplinary show “Blue Traditions” in 1973, “And Eagles Sweep Across the Sky,” which promoted Native American crafts in 1977, and “Patterns in a Revolution: French Printed Textiles. 1759-1821” which was installed in the BMA in 1988 and then went on to be exhibited at the Taft Museum in Cincinnati. She had a particular interest in Baltimore album quilts and drew national attention to these quilts sewn by Baltimore women during the 1840s. In 1981, she organized and wrote the catalogue for an exhibition of Baltimore Album quilt coverlets at the American Wing of the Metropolitan Museum of Art.

== Personal life ==
In 1946, she married Morton C. Katzenberg, whose family founded Merrygarden sportswear manufacturing company. Katzenberg had two sons David and Steve. Her son David died on June 24, 2000.

== External References ==
- Amelia Peck, American Quilts & Coverlets (New York: The Metropolitan Museum of Art, 1990).
- Loren R. Lerner & Mary F. Williamson, Art and Architecture in Canada: A Bibliography and Guide to the Literature v.1 (Toronto: University of Toronto Press, 1991).
- Dena S. Katzenberg, The Great American Cover-Up: Counterpanes of the Eighteenth and Nineteenth Centuries (Baltimore: The Baltimore Museum of Art, 1971).
- Dena S. Katzenberg, Baltimore Album Quilts (Baltimore: The Baltimore Museum of Art, 1981).
- Dena S. Katzenberg, Blue traditions: Indigo Dyed Textiles and Related Cobalt Glazed Ceramics from the 17th through the 19th century (Baltimore: The Baltimore Museum of Art, 1973).
- Zoe Annuis Perkins “Textiles from the Collection” Bulletin 21:1 (Spring 1994: St. Louis Art Museum, 1-63).
- ”Focus-Textile Show not for Ladies Only” 9 Dec. 1973 The Sun, D5.
- ”Indian blankets, baskets to be exhibited at museum” 18 Sept. 1977 The Sun, D12.
- John Dorsey, “Textiles that Speak for a Culture” 2 Oct. 1977 The Sun, SU10.
- ”Museum awarded $68,280 for research, catalogues” 10 Apr. 1977 The Sun, N6.
