= Mickey Duffy =

Polish-American mobster (1888-1931)

- Duffy mugshot
- Born: William Michael Cusick; 1888; Grays Ferry, Philadelphia, Pennsylvania, United States
- Died: August 30, 1931 (aged 42–43); Atlantic City, New Jersey, United States
- Cause of death: Gunshot
- Occupations: Bootlegger, mobster.
- Spouse: Edith Craig
- Allegiance: Irish Mob
- Convictions: Assault and battery with intent to kill
- Penalty: 2 years

Michael "Mickey" Duffy (born William Michael Cusick; 1888 - August 30, 1931) -- also known as John Murphy and George McEwen -- was a Polish-American mobster and rival of Maxie "Boo Boo" Hoff during Prohibition. He became one of the most famous and powerful beer bootleggers in Philadelphia and Atlantic City.

== Career ==
Born William Michael Cusick to Polish immigrants in Grays Ferry, Philadelphia, Pennsylvania, he changed his name to fit in well with the Irish gangs in Philadelphia. Duffy became involved in petty theft and other misdemeanors during his youth before more serious crimes during his teenage years, including armed robbery and hijacking prior to entering bootlegging during Prohibition.

In May 1919, Duffy was arrested for assault and battery with intent to kill serving two years and eleven months at the Eastern State Penitentiary, Philadelphia. Upon his release, Prohibition was law and organized crime syndicates began smuggling, making and selling illegal alcohol. He married Edith Craig shortly after his release.

=== Rise to power ===
By the early 1920s, Duffy had become one of the most dominant bootleggers in the Philadelphia metropolitan area possessing breweries in Philadelphia, Camden, and South Jersey. His associates included former rivals Max Hassel, Harry Green, James Richardson, Charles Bodine and Nicholas Delmore although he would be in frequent battles against rivals such as Hoff and the Bailey brothers throughout the decade.

During this time, Duffy expanded into legitimate businesses including owning several prominent clubs, including the Perkin and the fashionable Club Cadix at 23rd and Chestnut streets in Philadelphia in 1924. He ran his bootlegging and numbers businesses from the old Ritz-Carlton hotel. Duffy was shot three times leaving the Club Cadix late on the night of February 25, 1927 by Francis Bailey and Peter Ford. His bodyguard, John Bricker, was killed, and Earl Brown, the club's doorman, was also wounded. This shooting was the first instance of a Thompson submachine gun being used in Philadelphia's underworld. Duffy was treated at Hahneman Hospital in Philadelphia and returned to his bootlegging business.

In the mid-1920s, Duffy's violent methods brought him into conflict with Reading-based bootlegger Max Hassel. Along with Waxey Gordon, Hassel controlled a number of breweries in Pennsylvania and Northern New Jersey. The aggressive Duffy forced his way into the lucrative Jersey territory forcing Hassel to hand over a brewery to him.

Duffy earned such great profits from both beer and numbers businesses that by 1930 he had built a mansion for himself and his wife Edith in Penn Wynne, Pennsylvania. Duffy's home was on the Penn Wynne side of City Line across from 77th Street. Built by McWilliams & Maloney in the style of a Mediterranean villa, the structure had white with green satyrs on the sides and black palm trees painted on the facade.

Following the death of John Finiello, an agent of the Bureau of Prohibition killed during a September 19, 1930 raid on one of Duffy's breweries in Elizabeth, New Jersey, local authorities began cracking down on Duffy's criminal operations causing some animosity among his partners including his bodyguard and chauffeur Joseph Beatty.

== Death ==
While staying at the Ambassador Hotel in Atlantic City, Duffy was shot to death by unknown assailants on August 31, 1931. Although the case remained unsolved, it was suspected by authorities at the time that the alleged assailants may have been associates who had been disgruntled with Duffy and had conspired to seize control of Duffy's bootlegging operations.

Initially, Mafia member and future boxing promoter Frankie Carbo of the Lucchese crime family was charged with Duffy's murder, but was not prosecuted after furnishing an alibi, due to a lack of evidence.

Within several months, two individuals alleged to have been involved, Samuel E. Grossman and Albert Skale, were gunned down at a club on Watts Street and Girard Avenue in December 1931 beginning a wave of violence among various factions among the Philadelphia underworld.

He was interred in Mount Moriah Cemetery in Philadelphia. Duffy's funeral was an event. Thousands of people flocked to the cemetery but a police line kept them outside the entrance gate. Friends and family of Duffy required a special pass to enter.

== In popular culture ==
In the HBO TV series Boardwalk Empire, a fictional character Mickey Doyle is based on Mickey Duffy, played by Paul Sparks.
