= Polish-American organized crime =

Organized crime done by Polish-Americans

Polish Mob Polska mafia
- Founded by: Polish American immigrants
- Founding location: United States
- Years active: 1920s–present
- Territory: Poland, Western and Central Europe, New York City, Philadelphia, Cleveland, Chicago, Orlando, New Jersey, Dallas, Omaha, Pittsburgh, Detroit, Buffalo, St. Louis
- Ethnicity: Poles and Polish Americans (in the US)
- Criminal activities: Drug trafficking, weapon trafficking, Racketeering, loansharking, extortion, kidnapping, gambling, murder, theft
- Allies: Chicago Outfit
- Rivals: Irish Mob; Russian mafia

Polish-American organized crime has existed in the United States throughout the 20th and 21st centuries. Although not as well known as Cosa Nostra or Irish and Russian crime groups, the Polish Mob has a presence in many urban Polish American communities.

== Prohibition-era ==
During Prohibition, many Polish-American criminal gangs took advantage of the opportunity to make money through the illegal sale of alcohol. In Chicago, Joseph Saltis and Jake Guzik allied themselves with Al Capone's Chicago Outfit. However, fighting Capone was the North Side Gang, which, while mostly Irish-American, had a large Polish presence as well, with Hymie Weiss (Wojciechowski) having Polish heritage.

In New Jersey, Mickey Duffy, the son of Polish immigrants, was a prominent figure in the supply of illicit liquor to Philadelphia. He owned several breweries in southern New Jersey.

The infamous gangster Meyer Lansky, associate of Lucky Luciano, was a Polish Jew.

Joseph Filkowski led a mostly Polish bootlegging ring in Cleveland, Ohio, along with gangster Joseph Stazek. In Pittsburgh, Paul Jarwarski was also a prominent figure, carrying out the first armored car robbery.

In Buffalo, New York, John "Korney" Kwiatkowski led a gang called the "Korney Gang" that was involved in multiple murders and robberies.

== Philadelphia and New York Polish Mobs ==
=== Philly Polish Mob (Kielbasa Posse) ===
The Philadelphia Polish Mob, known as the Kielbasa Posse, are a Polish American organized crime group operating from the Port Richmond area in Philadelphia. Named after the Polish word for sausage, the gang is made up of Polish immigrants living in Port Richmond, Kensington, North Philadelphia, Northeast Philly, Bucks County, and South Jersey, as well as second-generation Polish Americans.

The gang moved into territory occupied by Irish, Russian, and Italian Mafia outfits, namely the trafficking and dealing of ecstasy, and are said to have moved into bookmaking and loansharking operations as well. They would meet several times a week at a local Polish bar. Many residents in the Port Richmond area of Philadelphia can tell of multiple accounts where these so-called gang members have caused trouble. They do not have a good relationship with the K&A Gang who controls most of Northeast Philly, because the Northeast is predominantly Irish. According to local residents, they are not well known and the older Polish residents of the neighborhood choose to ignore the existence of the gang.

=== Greenpoint Crew ===
In March 2006, the United States Attorney's Office in New York City published a press release covering the indictment of twenty-one members of the so-called Greenpoint Crew, a Polish criminal organization based in Greenpoint, Brooklyn. Led by Ostap Kapelioujnyj and Krzysztof Sprysak, the gang ran its operations of gunrunning, armed robbery, drug trafficking, extortion, car theft, credit card fraud and fencing (reportedly including a stolen Stradivarius violin) mostly in New York City, as well as having connections back in Poland and Eastern Europe. The gang was not above resorting to violence to achieve their aims, as one video used as evidence shows Kapelioujnyj discussing his threatening to kill a debtor with a golf club after already taking two computers, a camera, and an iPod.

== See also ==
- Organized crime in Poland
- Organized crime groups in Europe (navbox)
- North Side Gang
- Russian mafia
- Jewish-American organized crime
- You Kill Me
- The Informer
- The Wire
