= Margaret Lanzetta =

American artist

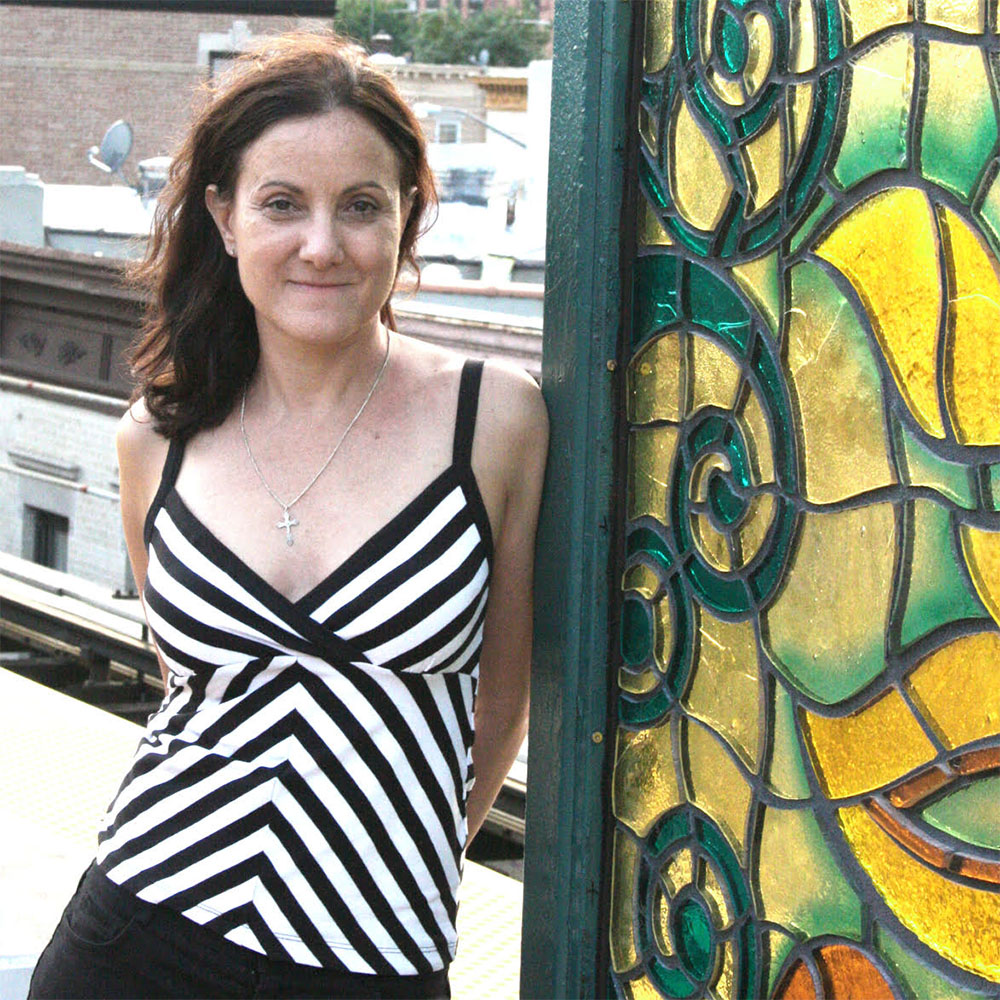
- Born: April 1, 1957 (age 69); Waterbury, Connecticut, U.S.
- Education: College of the Holy Cross (BA); School of Visual Arts (MFA)
- Occupation: Artist
- Website: margaretlanzetta.com

Margaret Lanzetta (born April 1, 1957) is an American artist who uses abstract & culturally-significant patterns to explore postmodern conditions of fragmentation, migration, and cultural hybridity. Lanzetta engages with a variety of mediums including painting, silkscreen, digital photography and ceramics.

Lanzetta's works are represented in the public collections of the Museum of Modern Art, New York; the British Museum, the Victoria and Albert Museum, London; the Yale University Art Gallery; the Harvard Art Museums; the New York Public Library Print Collection; and the Hallmark Art Collection.

== Education ==
Lanzetta was born in Waterbury, Connecticut in 1957. She graduated from the College of the Holy Cross with a B.A. in fine arts in 1979. In 1981, she attended the Skowhegan School of Painting and Sculpture in Maine, then an M.F.A. in 1989 from the School of Visual Arts. In 1989–90, Lanzetta received a Fulbright-Hays Award to study at the Kunstakademie Düsseldorf in the class of Tony Cragg. Lanzetta has cited Ronald Bladen, Ursula von Rydingsvard, and Judy Pfaff as important influences.

== Career ==
Lanzetta’s work uses of digital technology with traditional painting and printmaking. Manipulated, fragmented patterns, often rendered in industrial or printer’s saturated colors are silkscreened or hand stenciled on canvas or textiles.

Light in Wartime, Acrylic and crystal mica on rayon, satin, and sari fabric

=== Exhibitions and Commissions ===
Margaret Lanzetta's work has been exhibited at the Museum of Modern Art and the Queens Museum, New York; the Bangkok National Museum (pop up exhibition); the Weatherspoon Art Museum, North Carolina; and the Nicolaysen Art Museum, Wyoming. The New York MTA Arts & Design commissioned Lanzetta's first public, permanent work, Culture Swirl, a series of seven faceted glass-paneled windscreens, for the Norwood Avenue subway station in 2007. In 2020, Norte Maar commissioned new work by Lanzetta for CounterPointe 8, in collaboration with choreographer Mari Meade. Lanzetta silkscreened on harlequin print rayon, silver brocade, and magenta Thai silk to create swirling textile panels incorporated into the dance. The collaboration, entitled Strategy Royale, premiered to Alessio Natalizia's "24" by Not Waving.

In 2010, a 20-year survey exhibition, titled Pet The Pretty Tiger, was mounted at the Cantor Gallery in Worcester, Massachusetts. Lanzetta's work has been exhibited in numerous galleries in New York, and international venues in Tokyo, London, Düsseldorf, Rome, Singapore and Rabat (Morocco).

Lanzetta's work was included in the 2016 Kochi-Muziris International Biennale Collateral Projects, India.

=== Fellowships and awards ===
Lanzetta was an inaugural recipient of a Fulbright Global Scholar Award to India, Singapore, and Thailand, from 2016 to 2019. Earlier awards include a MESA Fulbright Scholar Award to Syria and India in 2007, and an Abbey Fellowship in Painting in 2003 for residency at the British School at Rome. Lanzetta has been awarded fellowships and residencies from the MacDowell Colony, the Ucross Foundation, Greenwich House Pottery, and Dieu Donné. Lanzetta has taught at Parsons School of Design, Western Carolina University, and held visiting artist appointments at Mount Holyoke College and the University of Southern Maine.
