= Salvatore Sabella =

Italian-American criminal mastermind

Salvatore Sabella (Italian pronunciation: [salvaˈtoːre saˈbɛlla]; July 7, 1891 – 1962) was an Italian-born crime boss of the Philadelphia crime family in the 1920s.

== Early life ==
Sabella was born in Castellammare del Golfo, Sicily, on July 7, 1891, and became a butcher's apprentice as a young boy. In 1905, tired of dealing with the butcher's violent outbursts, 14-year-old Sabella murdered him. In 1908, Sabella was convicted of the butcher's murder and sent to prison in Milan, Italy, for three years. At some point, either in prison or after his release, Sabella became involved with the Sicilian Mafia. After his release, Sabella left Italy for the United States, apparently as an illegal immigrant. In 1912, Sabella arrived in Brooklyn, New York, and joined the Salvatore D'Aquila criminal organization, which consisted of many other Castellammarese immigrants. During the next few years, mobster Giuseppe Traina trained Sabella for a future role in the organization.

== Philadelphia mob boss ==
In 1919, Sabella was sent to Philadelphia to build a Castellammarese Sicilian criminal organization. As a front, Sabella started an olive oil and cheese business and a soft drink cafe. However, his real occupation was to build the family and protect its operations from other criminals. Sabella would train future mob bosses John Avena and Angelo Bruno to run the family. In 1925 Sabella was a suspect in the murder of rival mobster Leo Lanzetti. On May 30, 1927, two rebellious members of the Philadelphia organization, Vincent Cocozza and Joseph Zanghi, were shot and killed on a Philadelphia street corner. Zanghi's brother Anthony provided police with sufficient evidence to indict Sabella for their murders. Sabella was acquitted, but the authorities discovered that he was an illegal alien. Towards the end of 1927, Sabella was deported to Sicily and Avena became acting boss.

== Castellammarese War ==
After Sabella's deportation, the Castellammarese War erupted in New York between the Castellamarese faction, led by traditional mob boss Salvatore Maranzano, and rival Giuseppe "Joe the Boss" Masseria. The two sides would trade gangland slayings for several years. As a Castellamarese immigrant, Sabella was allied with Maranzano. In 1929, having returned to the United States, Sabella temporarily relocated to New York with nine gunmen to fight for Maranzano. On April 15, 1931, the war ended with the murder of Masseria. At this time, Sabella returned to Philadelphia and resumed control of his family.

== Retirement ==
In 1931, Sabella was arrested for assault and battery with a motor vehicle. That same year, at age 40, Sabella retired from organized crime and permanently passed control of the family to Avena. The reason for Sabella's retirement is unclear; the recent carnage of the Castellammarese War may have prompted him to get out for his own safety.

Sabella reportedly moved to Norristown, Pennsylvania, where he worked as a butcher for many years. In 1962, Salvatore Sabella died of natural causes.

American Mafia
| Unknown | Philadelphia crime family Boss unknown–1962 | Succeeded by Joseph Ida |
