= Arnold Rothstein =

American crime boss (1882–1928)

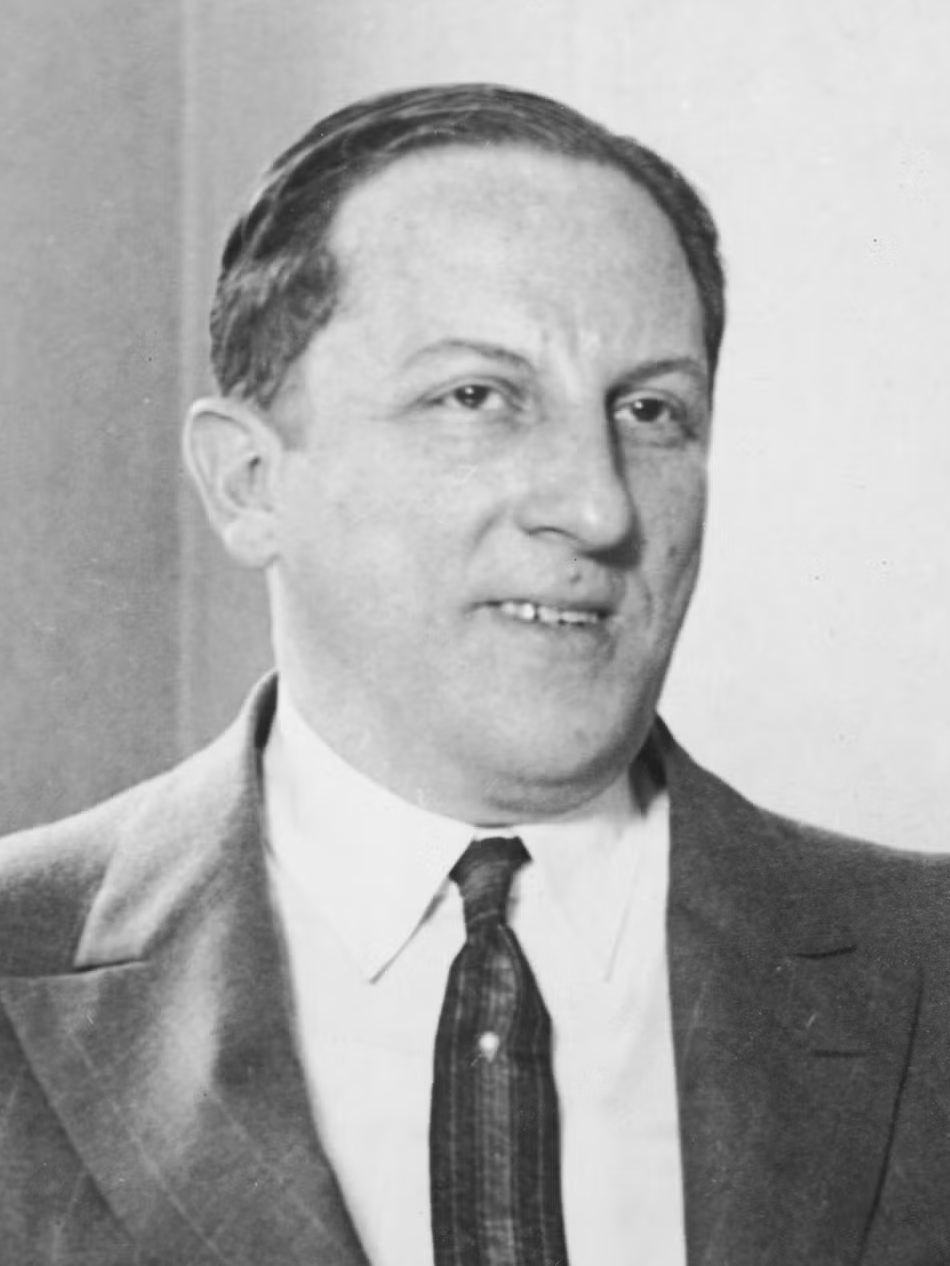
- Rothstein c. 1915
- Born: January 17, 1882; New York City, U.S.
- Died: November 6, 1928 (aged 46); New York City, U.S.
- Cause of death: Gunshot wounds
- Other names: The Brain, Mr. Big, The Fixer, The Man Uptown, The Big Bankroll
- Occupations: Racketeer, businessman, bootlegger, crime boss
- Spouse: Carolyn Green (1909–1928)

Arnold Rothstein (January 17, 1882 – November 6, 1928), nicknamed "The Brain", was an American racketeer, gangster, businessman and gambler who became a kingpin of the Jewish Mob in New York City. Rothstein was widely reputed to have organized corruption in professional athletics, including conspiring to fix the 1919 World Series. He was also a mentor of future crime bosses Lucky Luciano, Meyer Lansky, Frank Costello, Bugsy Siegel and numerous others.

Rothstein is credited with "transform[ing] organized crime from a thuggish activity by hoodlums into a big business run like a corporation", gaining notoriety as the person who first realized the lucrative opportunities afforded by Prohibition and "understood the truths of early 20th century capitalism (giving people what they want) and came to dominate them." His notoriety inspired several fictional characters based on his life, portrayed in contemporary and later forms of media, including the character Meyer Wolfshiem in F. Scott Fitzgerald's novel The Great Gatsby (1925).

Rothstein refused to pay a large debt resulting from a fixed poker game and was murdered in 1928. His illegal empire was broken up and distributed among a number of other underworld organizations, which led in part to the downfall of New York State's Tammany Hall political machine and the rise of reformer Fiorello La Guardia.

== Early life and education ==
Arnold Rothstein was born in New York City on January 17, 1882, the son of an affluent Ashkenazi Jewish businessman, Abraham Rothstein, and his wife, Esther Rothschild. His father was a man of upright character, who had acquired the nickname "Abe the Just." Rothstein himself was highly skilled at mathematics but was otherwise uninterested in school. Known to be a difficult child, Rothstein harbored a deep envy of his older brother Harry, who studied to become a rabbi. His father believed that young Rothstein craved to be the center of attention and became frustrated when he was not.

As a child, Rothstein began to indulge in gambling, despite repeated admonishment by his father. In 1921, when asked how he became a gambler, Rothstein said: "I always gambled. I can't remember when I didn't. Maybe I gambled just to show my father he couldn't tell me what to do, but I don't think so. I think I gambled because I loved the excitement. When I gambled, nothing else mattered."

== Illegitimate career ==
By 1910, at age 28, Rothstein had moved to the Tenderloin district of Manhattan, where he established a casino. He also invested in a horse racing track at Havre de Grace, Maryland, where he was reputed to have fixed many of the races that he won. Rothstein built a wide network of informants, very deep pockets from some among his father's banker associates and the willingness to pay a premium for good information, regardless of the source. His successes made him a millionaire by age 30.

== 1919 World Series ==
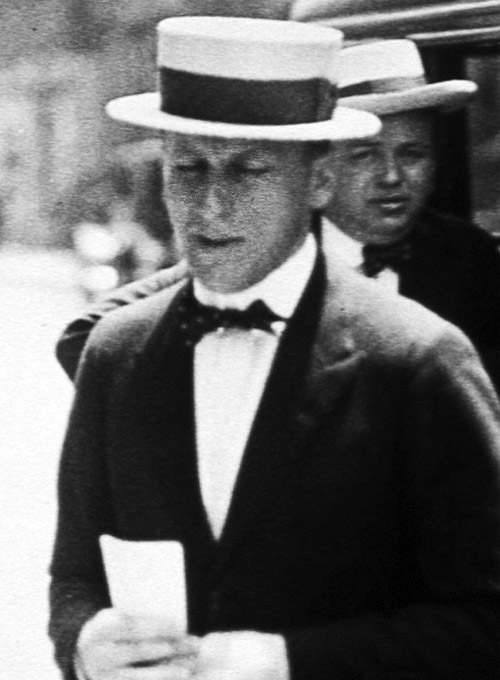
Rothstein in 1919

There is a great deal of evidence both for and against Rothstein being involved in the 1919 World Series fix. In 1919, Rothstein's agents allegedly paid members of the Chicago White Sox to throw the World Series to the Cincinnati Reds. He bet against them and made a large profit in what was called the "Black Sox Scandal".

Summoned to Chicago to testify before a grand jury investigating the incident, Rothstein said he was an innocent businessman, intent on clearing his name and his reputation. Prosecutors could find no evidence linking Rothstein to the affair, and he was never indicted. Rothstein testified:

The whole thing started when Abe [Attell] and some other cheap gamblers decided to frame the Series and make a killing. The world knows I was asked in on the deal and my friends know how I turned it down flat. I don't doubt that Attell used my name to put it over. That's been done by smarter men than Abe. But I was not in on it, would not have gone into it under any circumstances and did not bet a cent on the Series after I found out what was under way.

In another version of the story, Rothstein was first approached by Joseph "Sport" Sullivan, a gambler, who suggested Rothstein help fix the World Series. Rothstein supposedly refused Sullivan's proposal but when he received Attell's offer, Rothstein reconsidered Sullivan's first offer. He figured that the competition to fix the game made it worth the risk to get involved and still be able to conceal his involvement. David Pietrusza's biography of Rothstein suggests that the gangster worked both ends of the fix with Sullivan and Attell. Michael Alexander concluded that Attell fixed the Series "probably without Arnold Rothstein's approval", which "did not prevent Rothstein from betting on the Series with inside knowledge".

Leo Katcher said that "all the records and minutes of the Grand Jury disappeared. So too did the signed confessions of Cicotte, Williams and Jackson.... The state, virtually all of its evidence gone, sought to get the players to repeat their confession on the stand. This they refused to do, citing the Fifth Amendment." Eventually, the judge had no choice but to dismiss the case. Katcher went on, "Thus, on the official record and on the basis of [State Attorney Maclay] Hoyne's statement, Rothstein was never involved in the fixing of the Series. Also, on the official record, it was never proved that the Series had been fixed." Despite the legal case against the ballplayer defendants being dismissed, all eight White Sox players named as trial defendants were permanently banned from playing or participating as coaches in Major League Baseball (MLB) by the newly named first Commissioner, Kenesaw Mountain Landis. Despite all the denials, Katcher noted that "while Rothstein won the Series, he won a small sum. He always maintained it was less than $100,000. It actually was about $350,000. It could have been much – very much – more. It wasn't because Rothstein chickened out. A World Series fix was too good to be true – even if it was true."

== 1921 Travers Stakes ==
Under the pseudonym "Redstone Stable", Rothstein owned a racehorse named Sporting Blood, a very popular racehorse in the early 1920s, which won the 1921 Travers Stakes under suspicious circumstances. Rothstein allegedly conspired with a leading trainer, Sam Hildreth, to drive up Sporting Blood's odds. Hildreth entered an outstanding three-year-old, Grey Lag, on the morning of the race, causing Sporting Blood's odds to rise to 3–1. Rothstein bet $150,000 through bookmakers, allegedly having been informed that the second favorite, Prudery, was off her feed. Just before post time and without explanation, Hildreth scratched Grey Lag from the starting list. Rothstein collected over $500,000 in bets plus the purse, but a conspiracy was never proved.

== Prohibition and organized crime ==
With the advent of Prohibition, Rothstein saw the opportunities for bootlegging and narcotics. Liquor was smuggled across the Hudson River, as well as from Canada across the Great Lakes and into Upstate New York. Rothstein also purchased holdings in a number of speakeasies. He became the first to import illegal Scotch whisky in his own fleet of transatlantic freighters, knowing that high-end booze would be the "chic thing to have."

With his banking support and high-level political connections, Rothstein soon managed to end-run Tammany Hall to the street gangs. Subsequently, his criminal organization included such underworld notables as Meyer Lansky, Jack "Legs" Diamond, Charles "Lucky" Luciano, and Dutch Schultz, whose combined gangs and double-dealing with their own respective bosses subverted the entire late 19th-century form of political gangsterism. Rothstein's various nicknames were Mr. Big, The Fixer, The Man Uptown, The Big Bankroll, and The Brain.

Rothstein frequently mediated disputes among the New York gangs and reportedly charged a hefty fee for his services. His favorite "office" was Lindy's, at Broadway and 49th Street in Manhattan. He often stood on the corner surrounded by his bodyguards and did business on the street. Rothstein made bets and collected debts from those who had lost the previous day. Meanwhile, he exploited his role as mediator with the city's legitimate business world and soon forced Tammany Hall to recognize him as a necessary ally in its administration of the city. Many historians credit him as the first successful modern drug dealer.

By 1925, Rothstein was one of the nation's most powerful criminals and had forged a large criminal empire. For a time he was the nation's largest bootlegger, until the rise of George Remus, with a reported wealth of over $10 million (equivalent to $162 million in 2024).

== Death ==
On November 4, 1928, Rothstein was shot and wounded during a business meeting at Manhattan's Park Central Hotel at Seventh Avenue near 55th Street. He died two days later at the New York Polyclinic Hospital.

The shooting was reportedly linked to debts owed from a three-day high-stakes poker game in October, for which Rothstein owed $320,000 (equivalent to $6 million in 2025). He claimed the game was fixed and refused to pay, provoking his murder. Gambler George "Hump" McManus was arrested for homicide, but later acquitted for lack of evidence.

According to Kevin Cook, author of Titanic Thompson, the poker game was fixed by gambler Titanic Thompson (born Alvin Clarence Thomas) and his associate, Nate Raymond. Due to some complicated side bets, by the end Rothstein owed Raymond $319,000 (much of which Raymond, by secret agreement, was to pass on to Thompson); $30,000 to Thompson; and about $200,000 to the other gamblers present. McManus owed Rothstein $51,000. Rothstein stalled for time, saying he would not be able to pay until after the elections of November 1928, when he expected to win $550,000 for backing Herbert Hoover for president and Franklin D. Roosevelt for governor. Thompson testified at McManus's trial, calling him "a swell loser" who would never have shot Rothstein. According to Cook, Thompson later told some of his acquaintances that the killer had not been McManus, but his bag man Hyman Biller, who fled to Cuba shortly afterward.

In Kill the Dutchman!, a biography of Dutch Schultz published in 1971, the crime reporter Paul Sann suggested that Schultz murdered Rothstein. He says this was in retaliation for the murder of Schultz's friend and associate Joey Noe by Rothstein's protégé Jack "Legs" Diamond.

On his deathbed, Rothstein refused to identify his shooter, answering police inquiries with "You stick to your trade. I'll stick to mine", and "Me mudder [my mother] did it." Rothstein was buried at Ridgewood's Union Field Cemetery.

=== Break-up of empire ===
At the time of Rothstein's death, Prohibition was in full swing, various street gangs were battling for control of liquor distribution, and the carefully constructed political boss structure of the late 19th century had collapsed. Frank Erickson, Meyer Lansky, Bugsy Siegel, and other former associates split up Rothstein's criminal enterprises after his death. The already-weakened Tammany Hall had relied on Rothstein to control the new street gangs, and his death finished the corrupt political organization. With Tammany's fall, reformer Fiorello La Guardia rose in prominence and was elected Mayor of New York City in 1933.

=== Alleged ties with Alfred Lowenstein ===
In his biography of Rothstein titled Rothstein: The Life, Times, and Murder of the Criminal Genius Who Fixed the 1919 World Series, author David Pietrusza alleged that Rothstein became partners with Belgian financier Alfred Lowenstein to fund a major drugs deal in spring 1928, and that Lowenstein's mysterious death would have cut off the necessary funding, causing Rothstein to dig deeper into his already stretched resources to prevent the deal from collapsing.

== In popular culture ==
=== Theater ===
- In 1930, Rothstein's girlfriend, Inez Norton, to whom he had left a substantial sum in his will, appeared in the Broadway play Room 349 by Mark Lindner, which claimed to represent the actual circumstances of his murder.

=== Literature ===
- Rothstein is referred to as "The Brain" in several of Damon Runyon's short stories, including a fictional version of his death in "The Brain Goes Home". As a newspaper reporter, Runyon came to know Rothstein personally and later covered the trial of his alleged killer. According to historian David Pietrusza, Rothstein was also the inspiration for the character Nathan Detroit, who appears in the short story "Blood Pressure" as well as the musical Guys and Dolls.
- In The Great Gatsby, Meyer Wolfsheim is a Jewish friend and mentor of Jay Gatsby, described as a gambler who fixed the World Series. The character is commonly assumed to be an allusion to Rothstein.

=== Film and television ===
- In the 1930 film Street of Chance, William Powell played a gambler who is shot after cheating in a poker game. The film was widely recognized as based on Rothstein's murder.
- With the fictional name Murray Golden, he was portrayed by Spencer Tracy in the 1934 film Now I'll Tell, loosely based on the autobiography of wife and widow Carolyn Green Rothstein (or "Mrs. Arnold Rothstein," as the film's title card reads).
- Rothstein was portrayed in the 1960 film The Rise and Fall of Legs Diamond by Robert Lowery.
- In the 1961 film The Big Bankroll (a.k.a. King of the Roaring Twenties: The Story of Arnold Rothstein) by David Janssen.
- In a deleted scene from the 1974 Best Picture winner The Godfather Part II, supporting character Hyman Roth is introduced to Vito Corleone, who suggests that he change his name, which was originally Hyman Suchowsky. When Vito asks him whom he admires, Suchowsky says Arnold Rothstein, for having fixed the 1919 World Series; accordingly, he changes his last name to Roth.
- In the 1981 film Gangster Wars and series The Gangster Chronicles, played by George DiCenzo.
- In the 1988 sports drama film Eight Men Out, played by Michael Lerner.
- In the 1991 film Mobsters, played by F. Murray Abraham.
- In the 1995 Martin Scorsese film Casino the protagonist, Sam "Ace" Rothstein, was named for Arnold Rothstein but modeled on real-life sports bettor and fixer Frank "Lefty" Rosenthal.
- In the 1999 biopic Lansky, played by Stanley DeSantis.
- In the HBO series Boardwalk Empire, played by Michael Stuhlbarg.
- He is portrayed by Hugh Scully in the AMC series The Making of the Mob: New York, a docudrama focusing on the history of the mob.

== Associates ==
- Waxey Gordon – worked as a rum-runner for Rothstein during the first years of Prohibition.
- Harry "Nig" Rosen – involved in narcotics with Rothstein during the mid-1920s.
- Lucky Luciano – viewed to have been mentored by Rothstein, who supported him early in his career as a racketeer and taught him how to be a full-fledged kingpin. They are both among New York's most notorious gangster kingpins, and are directly responsible for the modernization and subsequent public obsession with American organized crime.
- Meyer Lansky – along with partner Luciano, he was somewhat mentored by Rothstein during Prohibition. Both Jewish Mob members, they were instrumental in the rise and glorification of modern American organized crime.
- Alfred Loewenstein, Belgian financier, with whom Rothstein allegedly had a deal to supply America with European-made heroin.
- Enoch "Nucky" Johnson – business partners during the bootlegging boom of the Roaring Twenties.

== See also ==
- Fuller case
- Hofstadter Committee
- List of unsolved murders (1900–1979)

== Sources ==
- Bruccoli, Matthew J. (2002) [1981]. Some Sort of Epic Grandeur: The Life of F. Scott Fitzgerald (2nd rev. ed.). Columbia, South Carolina: University of South Carolina Press. ISBN 1-57003-455-9 – via Internet Archive.
