= Waxey Gordon =

American mobster

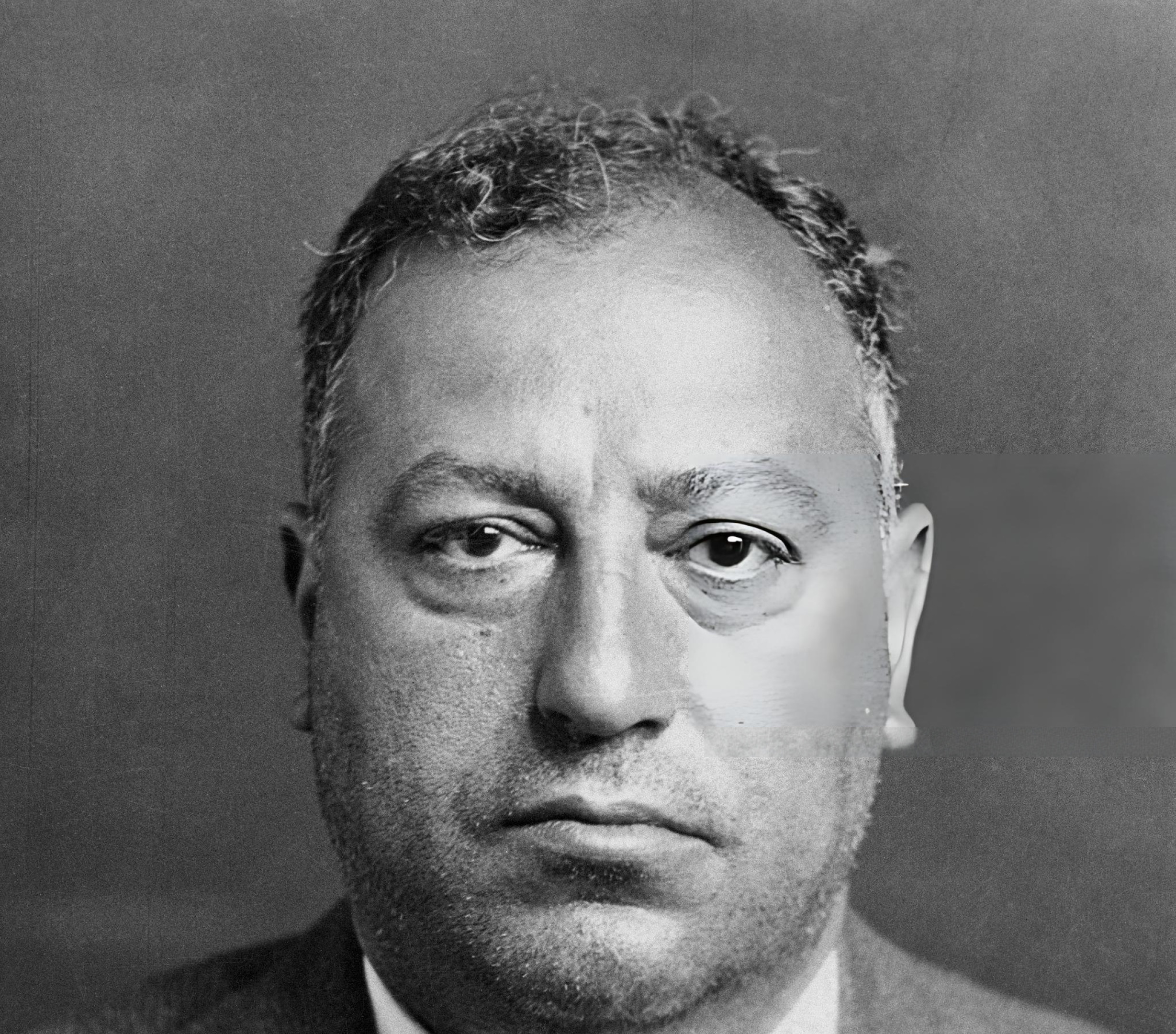
- Gordon in 1933
- Born: Irving Wexler; January 19, 1888; New York City, U.S.
- Died: June 24, 1952 (aged 64); San Francisco, California, U.S.
- Occupations: Bootlegger, racketeer
- Convictions: Tax evasion, narcotics trafficking
- Penalty: 10 years, 25 years

Irving Wexler (born January 19, 1888 – June 24, 1952), better known as Waxey Gordon, was an American gangster who specialized in bootlegging and illegal gambling. An associate of Arnold Rothstein during prohibition, he was caught up in a power struggle following Rothstein's death. Fellow Rothstein associates Charles "Lucky" Luciano and Meyer Lansky provided authorities with evidence that led to his imprisonment for ten years.

== Youth and early career ==
He was born Irving Wexler to Polish Jewish immigrant parents in New York's Lower East Side on January 19, 1888. Gordon became known as a pickpocket and sneak thief as a child, becoming so successful he earned the nickname "Waxey" for supposedly being so skilled in picking pockets it was as if his victims' wallets were lined with wax. In 1914, he participated in a gang fight that resulted in the death of a court clerk named Samuel Straus. Wexler was put on trial for the crime but acquitted by a jury in February 1917.

Joining "Dopey" Benny Fein's labor sluggers in the early 1910s Gordon helped organize Fein's operations before being noticed by Arnold Rothstein, who hired him away from Fein and put him to work as a rum-runner during the first years of Prohibition.

== Prohibition and decline ==
Gordon's success later led him to run all of Rothstein's bootlegging on most of the east coast, specifically New York and New Jersey, and importing large amounts of Canadian whisky over the Canada–United States border. Gordon, now earning an estimated $2 million a year, began buying numerous breweries and distilleries as well as owning several speakeasies. Gordon began to be known to live extravagantly, traveling in limousines and living in prominent Manhattan hotel suites, as well as owning mansions built for him in New York and Philadelphia.

Rothstein died in 1928 and Gordon's position began to decline. He made an alliance with future National Crime Syndicate founders Charles Luciano, Louis Buchalter, and Meyer Lansky. Gordon, however, constantly fought with Lansky over bootlegging and gambling interests and soon a gang war began between the two; several associates on each side were killed. Lansky, with Luciano, supplied interim United States Attorney Thomas E. Dewey with information leading to Gordon's conviction on charges of tax evasion in 1933.

Gordon had a large million-dollar operation that included many trucks, buildings, processing plants, and associated employees and his business front could not account for this ownership and cash flow and he paid no taxes on it. Gordon was sentenced to ten years' imprisonment. At this time he was married to a rabbi's daughter and their son was in medical school. This son died in a weather-related automobile accident while traveling from an out-of-town college planning to plead with the judge for leniency with his father's sentence. Gordon had tried to insulate his otherwise respectable family from his organized crime career and the incident greatly shocked their relations, and great stress was put on the deteriorating marriage.

== Later career ==
Upon Gordon's release from prison, he found his gang long since disbanded. Ignored by his former political connections, he reportedly remarked to a journalist, "Waxey Gordon is dead. Meet Irving Wexler, salesman." He moved to California, a single man, and during World War II he was able to obtain 10,000 lbs of scarce, coupon-rationed sugar to sell on the black market. FBI investigations revealed he had high-level international narcotics connections, and was given the U.S. West Coast as a protected territory for distribution of imported illegal drugs since he lost his bootlegging business on the East Coast.

In 1951, Gordon was arrested for selling heroin to an undercover police officer. The 62-year-old gangster reportedly offered the detective all his money in exchange for his release. When the detective refused, Gordon jokingly pleaded with the detective to kill him instead of arresting him for "peddling junk." Gordon was later convicted, and due to his long criminal record was sentenced to 25 years of imprisonment in Alcatraz, where he died of a heart attack on June 24, 1952.
