= List of incidents of civil unrest in Chicago =

This list is about incidents of civil unrest, rioting, violent labor disputes, or minor insurrections or revolts in Chicago, Illinois.

== 19th century ==
Riots and civil unrest in Chicago chronological order
Date	Issue	Event	Deaths	Injuries
April 21, 1855	Prohibition, immigration	Lager Beer Riot - German and Irish immigrants rioted after mayor Levi Boone raised the cost of a liquor license, an act that was seen as targeting those groups. One rioter was killed by police after he shot a policeman.	1	1+
July 23 – 26, 1877	Labor	Chicago railroad strike of 1877 - Part of a nationwide wave of strikes by railroad workers after most rail companies slashed wages. The majority of deaths occurred during the Battle of the Viaduct, where workers threw stones and fired at police who then returned fire.	30+	100+
May 4, 1886	Labor	Haymarket affair - An unknown person threw a dynamite bomb at police during what was an otherwise peaceful rally for striking workers. Police then opened fire on the crowd and in total four protestors and seven policemen were killed.	11	130+
1894	Labor	Pullman Strike - Began on May 11, 1894, after workers for the Pullman Company began strike after a reduction in wages. The strike spread nationwide and shut down most railroad traffic west of Detroit. The strike lasted several months and 30 strikers were killed in various riots and clashes with government forces.	30	57

== 20th century ==
=== 1900–1949 ===
Riots and civil unrest in Chicago chronological order
Date	Issue	Event	Deaths	Injuries
April–July, 1905	Labor	1905 Chicago teamsters' strike - The United Brotherhood of Teamsters started a strike in support for a small union of workers from Montgomery Ward but soon garnered support from most unions in the city. Riots occurred almost daily starting on April 7 and continued until late July.	21	416
July 27 – August 3, 1919	Racial	Chicago race riot of 1919 - The deadliest of wave of race riots across America during the Red Summer of 1919. Started after a Black swimmer drowned at a segregated beach after being hit by a rock thrown by a white man. The death ignited simmering tensions between Black migrants from the American south and predominately Irish immigrants on Chicago's South Side. The rioting lasted a week and resulted in the deaths of 23 Black people and 15 whites and left over 1,000 people, primarily Black, homeless.	38	537
1916–21	Political, organized crime	Aldermen's wars - Alderman John Powers and challenger Anthony D'Andrea battled over control of Chicago's 19th Ward, located in Little Italy. Both were associated with organized crime and over 30 people were murdered during the feud before D'Andrea was killed in 1921.	30+	Unknown
1931	Housing	A protest against the growing number of evictions as a result of the Great Depression turned violent. Three protestors were killed and three policemen injured, leading mayor Anton Cermak to declare a moratorium on evictions.	3	3+
December 17, 1933	Ethnic, political	Several hundred communists attacked a march organized by Ukrainian immigrants to protest the policies of the Soviet Union towards Ukraine. Over 100 people were injured as the communists threw bricks, rocks and beat people with clubs.	0	100+
May 30, 1937	Labor	Memorial Day massacre of 1937 - Occurred during nationwide strikes against steel companies which refused to sign union contracts. 10 unarmed strikers were shot by police after they attempted to pass through a police blockade.	10	67+
1944–1947	Racial, housing	In the final years of and years following World War II, hundreds of racially motivated firebombings, assaults and riots occurred in Chicago as a result of Black people, often veterans, moving into white neighborhoods, predominately on the South Side.	4	Dozens
1946	Racial, housing	Airport Homes race riots - A number of riots against Black people occurred in temporary housing for returning veterans in the West Lawn and West Elsdon neighborhoods during 1946.	0	Unknown
July 25–28, 1947	Racial	About 2,000 whites gathered outside a house at 7153 South Saint Lawrence Avenue after a Black postal worker named Roscoe Johnson bought it. The house was firebombed and nearly destroyed and disturbances occurred in the neighborhood for three days after the initial violence.	0	Unknown
August 1947	Racial, housing	Fernwood Park race riot - White residents of the Fernwood Park neighborhood rioted after a number of Black veterans and their families were brought into a housing project in the neighborhood.	0	35+
November 8–12, 1949	Racial	Englewood race riot - Up to 10,000 whites in the Englewood neighborhood rioted after a rumor spread that Black people and Jewish communists were planning to take over the neighborhood.	0	13+

=== 1950–1999 ===
Riots and civil unrest in Chicago chronological order
Date	Issue	Event	Deaths	Injuries
1953	Racial, housing	White residents of the Trumbull Park Homes rioted for weeks after a Black family was moved into the project. More riots occurred after 10 more Black families moved in.	0	Unknown
June 12–14, 1966	Ethnic	Division Street riots - Around 4,000 Puerto Ricans rioted in Humboldt Park and West Town after a young Puerto Rican man was shot and wounded by a white police officer during celebrations of Chicago's first Puerto Rican week.	0	16
July 12–15, 1966	Racial	1966 Chicago West Side Riots - Black residents of the Chicago's West Side rioted after a Black man was arrested by police for opening a fire hydrant. Several cars and businesses were firebombed or vandalism and youths threw stones at passing cars at one point. More than 30 people were injured, including six policemen who were shot, and two civilians, including a pregnant teenager, were killed by stray gunfire.	2	30+
July 31, 1966	Racial	White residents attacked 550 civil rights protesters who marched into their neighborhood.	0	54
August 5, 1966	Racial, housing	Marquette Park rallies - A march for open housing organized by Martin Luther King Jr. and the Chicago Freedom Movement turned violent after they attempted to march through the then all-white neighborhood Marquette Park. Around 5,000 white locals threw rocks, bricks and bottles at marchers and police while yelling racial insults, with King being struck in the head and describing the opposition as the most "hostile and as hate-filled" he'd ever encountered. Over 30 people were injured and at least 40 people were arrested.	0	30+
April 5–7, 1968	Racial	1968 Chicago riots - One of the over 100 riots that erupted nationwide after the assassination of Martin Luther King Jr. Most of the Chicago rioting occurred on the West Side and was the second deadliest (11 fatalities, versus 13 in the Washington D.C. riots) of the riots in the nation after King's death.	11	500
August 23–28, 1968	Political	1968 Democratic National Convention protest activity - Protesters from the countercultural and anti-Vietnam War attempted to disrupt the Democratic National Convention and clashed with police for several days. 152 officers were wounded as were over 600 protesters and bystanders but no one was killed.	0	752+
October 8–11, 1969	Political	Days of Rage - Activists from the Students for a Democratic Society (SDS) and Weather Underground staged mass direct actions in an attempt to recreate the success of the previous year's DNC protests and to end the Vietnam war. The actions results in large clashes with police and did not garner as much support as the SDS and Weathermen had hoped for.	0	34+
July 27, 1970	Youth	Thousands of youths rioted at Grant Park and later the Loop after a Sly and the Family Stone concert. The concert-goers were not expecting opening acts at the concert and became enraged when Sly was not first band to perform. They rushed the stage and began battling police, eventually spilling into the Loop district where they smashed windows and looted many businesses.	0	162
June 6, 1976	Racial	Marquette Park rallies - Around 200 youths from Marquette Park threw stones and bottles at passing motorists and police officers after a Black group that was set to protest at the park failed to arrive.	0	Several
July 17, 1976	Racial, housing	Marquette Park rallies - 100 Black and white activists protesting against housing discrimination as well as police were attacked by around 1,000 white residents of Marquette Park with bricks, rocks and bottles. A Chicago Tribune reporter reported seeing local youths retrieving the projectiles from alleyways where they had presumably been stashed in anticipation of the march. 33 people, including 16 policemen, were injured and 63 people were arrested. The marchers alleged the police made little attempt to protect them and 8 Chicago Police officers were suspected of being involved in the mob while off duty.	0	33
June 4–5, 1977	Ethnic	Humboldt Park riot - Puerto Ricans from Humboldt Park clashed with police for a day and a half after two Puerto Rican men were killed by police shortly after the Puerto Rican day parade.	3	153
July 23, 1977	Racial	Marquette Park rallies - White residents attacked black motorists along Marquette Road after a Black group that was supposed to march along the road was blocked from doing so.	0	19
July 9, 1978	Racial, political	Marquette Park rallies - During a Neo-Nazi rally at Marquette Park, several fights broke out between counter-protestors and local supporters of the Nazis.	0	Several
July 12, 1979	Hooliganism	Disco Demolition Night - The Chicago White Sox attempted draw more spectators to Comiskey Park by inviting radio host Steve Dahl to blow up disco records prior to a game. After Dahl blew up the records, thousands of people rushed on to the field and began to tear apart the stadium. Riot police had to be called in and the White Sox were forced to forfeit the scheduled game.	0	0-30
June 28, 1986	Racial	Marquette Park rallies - The Ku Klux Klan and other white supremacist groups as well as counter-demonstrators and black and anti-Apartheid groups attempted to stage rallies at Marquette Park on June 28, 1986. Each of the rallies had fewer than 75 participants. Klan members were attacked by bat-wielding members of the International Committee Against Racism (INCAR) while arriving at the park. The INCAR and the Black groups attempted to attack the Klan again once they reached the park but were chased out and then attacked by up to 3,000 local white residents who chanted "niggers go home". The local whites attempted to block the anti-Apartheid demonstrators from leaving the park before police gained control over the situation. Six civilians and eight police officers were injured and 17 people were arrested over the course of the day.	0	14
1991–1997	Hooliganism	Chicago Bulls Championship riots - Rioting and looting occurred each time the Chicago Bulls won the NBA Championship in 1991, 1992, 1993, 1996 and 1997. The most serious riot occurred in 1992 and several people were killed in 1993.	5+	Hundreds

== 21st century ==
Riots and civil unrest in Chicago chronological order
Date	Issue	Event	Deaths	Injuries
May 20–21, 2012	Political	Chicago NATO summit protests - Mass protests against a NATO summit held in Chicago. Protestors scuffled with police and more than two dozen were injured after being clubbed with police batons.	0	24+
March 11, 2016	Political	2016 Donald Trump Chicago rally protest - Protestors shut down a Donald Trump rally and clashed with police afterwards.	0	4+
May 28 - August 10, 2020	Political/Social issues	George Floyd protests in Chicago	15	284+ police officers

== See also ==
- Chicago shooting
- List of incidents of civil unrest in the United States
- Lists of Incidents of unrest and violence in the United States by city
- List of riots (notable incidents of civil disorder worldwide)
- List of strikes
