= Samuzzo Amatuna =

Italian-born American mobster (1898–1925)

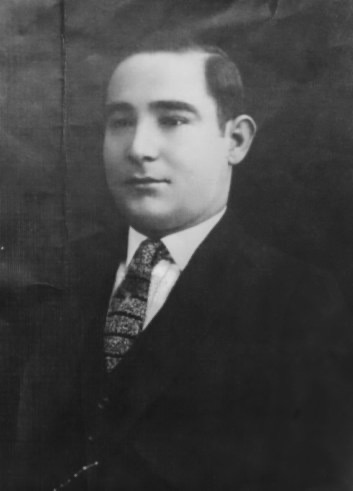
Portrait photograph of Amatuna

Salvatore "Samuzzo" Amatuna (also spelled Ammatuna; August 3, 1898 – November 13, 1925), also known as "Samoots", was an Italian-born American mobster and member of the Genna Brothers in Chicago who served as president of the Unione Siciliana.

== Early life ==
Amatuna was born in Pozzallo, Sicily, in 1898 and emigrated to the United States in the early 20th century, eventually arriving in Chicago's Little Italy. As a teenager, he worked as a messenger for the Genna Brothers, a group of ruthless Sicilian gangsters. He earned a full membership in the Genna gang on February 21, 1916 at age 17 by murdering Frank Lombardi outside a saloon. Lombardi was a supporter of incumbent Chicago alderman John Powers, a bitter enemy of the Genna brothers. The brutal warfare between the Gennas and Powers became known in Chicago as the Aldermen's Wars.

== Prohibition and the Bloody Nineteenth Ward ==
Prohibition began in 1920, and Amatuna had already become one of the Gennas' leading members. The brothers continued to battle the Powers faction for political control of the Nineteenth Ward. The Gennas began bootlegging operations and became one of the main suppliers of homemade alcohol to the Torrio-Capone gang. Amatuna was the enforcer who oversaw production of the gang's numerous "alky cookers", and he became the personal bodyguard for "Bloody" Angelo Genna by the end of 1920.

On September 28, a bomb exploded on the front porch of Powers' home. In spite of great damage, no one inside was hurt. Powers suspected that Amatuna was the bomber on orders from the Gennas. For the rest of 1920 and into 1921, Powers stationed armed guards and private detectives around his house as he campaigned against Anthony D'Andrea. Despite frequent bombings, Powers narrowly won the election. Enraged by his defeat, Angelo Genna blamed Paul Labriola, a municipal court bailiff and a Powers supporter, for convincing Sicilian and other Italian immigrants to support Powers. On March 9, 1921, Angelo, Amatuna, and Genna lieutenant Frank "Don Chick" Gambino shot and killed Labriola. Witnesses identified Genna and Gambino, and the two men were charged with murder; however, the case was eventually dropped due to lack of evidence. Amatuna was later a suspect in the murders of Powers' supporters Harry Raimondi and Gaetano Esposito.

By age 25, Amatuna had several bank accounts and held interests in various legitimate businesses. He earned the reputation of a "dandy" and would be seen attending operas with Angelo and other gunmen, often wearing expensive diamond studs and cufflinks, and he bought the Bluebird Cafe, a restaurant in Halsted Street in Chicago. He was confident that he was safe in the Bluebird and never wore his two guns there. He once boasted to reporters that "no one can shoot me in here. This place is full of my friends. Any guy who would hurt me here would be torn apart by my patrons".

== Later years ==
By the mid-1920s, the Genna brothers were enmeshed in a vicious gang war with the North Side Gang, a primarily Irish gang run by Hymie Weiss. In May 1925, Angelo Genna was murdered by the North Siders. Amatuna was in charge of the Genna gang, and he struggled to keep the organization from disintegrating. He walked into the headquarters of the Unione Siciliana, a powerful fraternal group under mob control, and declared himself president, which upset Al Capone. Capone was a Genna ally, but he wanted to control the Unione Siciliana himself.

== Death ==
On the evening of November 10, 1925, Amatuna was preparing to attend the opera Aïda at the Auditorium Theatre with his girlfriend Rose Picorara. He visited a barbershop on Roosevelt Road for a shave and manicure, his usual habit before going out for the evening. Owner Isadore Paul commented on the fact that he was without his bodyguards, and Amatuna replied that he had not been able to reach them that day. Paul applied a hot towel on Amatuna's face, when two unidentified men rushed into the barbershop and drew their guns. The barber's screams alerted Amatuna, who quickly ducked behind the barber chair; however, he was shot in the chest twice during the gunfight as the gunmen escaped. Amatuna requested at the hospital that a priest marry him and Rosa, but he died on the morning of the 13th before the ceremony was completed.

The identities of the men who killed Amatuna were eventually revealed as North Side Gang members Vincent "The Schemer" Drucci and Jim Doherty, with Frank Gusenberg as the driver; however, no charges were ever brought against them. The noted absence of Amatuna bodyguards Goldstein and Zion has also been questioned, but it is not known whether they were paid off to stay away that night or if they had defected to the Northsiders, as they were both killed shortly after his death. Zion was killed when returning from Amatuna's funeral on November 17, and Goldstein was killed with a shotgun in a drugstore by two unidentified gunmen on November 25. The remaining Genna Brothers later commented that Amatuna's death was inevitable after he began hiring non-Sicilian bodyguards, disregarding tradition.

== See also ==
- List of homicides in Illinois § Organized crime
