= James Bowler (politician) =

American politician

James B. Bowler
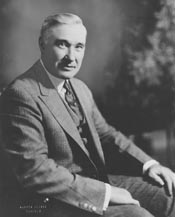

Member of the U.S. House of Representatives from Illinois's 7th district
- In office July 7, 1953 – July 18, 1957
- Preceded by: Adolph J. Sabath
- Succeeded by: Roland V. Libonati

Chicago Alderman from the 25th Ward
- In office February 26, 1935 – July 11, 1953
- Succeeded by: Vito Marzullo
- In office 1927 – June 7, 1934
- Preceded by: John Powers

Chicago Alderman from the 19th Ward
- In office 1906 – 1923; With John Powers
- Preceded by: Fred D. Ryan
- Succeeded by: Donald S. McKinlay

Personal details
- Born: February 5, 1875 Chicago, Illinois, US
- Died: July 18, 1957 (aged 82) Chicago, Illinois, US
- Resting place: All Saints Cemetery
- Party: Democratic
- Spouse: Anastasia V. Sweeney
- Occupation: Chicago Alderman; U.S. Congressman

James Bernard Bowler (February 5, 1875 – July 18, 1957) was an American politician from Chicago, Illinois. He served three terms as a United States representative for Illinois. Elected at age 78, Bowler is the second oldest person to win his first election to Congress, after William Lewis of Kentucky.

== Early life ==
Bowler was born in Chicago, Illinois, on February 5, 1875. He attended the parochial and public schools of Chicago, and was a professional bicycle endurance rider and racer before running for Alderman. He later became involved in the insurance business and was the owner of several race horses, both ventures he acquired from the family of John Coughlin following Coughlin's death.

== Career ==
=== Chicago politics ===
He became an Alderman (City Councilman) for Chicago's 19th Ward in 1906, serving alongside John Powers. When Anthony D'Andrea ran against Bowler in 1916, the violence during the election sparked the five-year-long Aldermen's Wars, which saw thirty political operatives killed.

Bowler served on the Chicago City Council until 1953, with hiatuses from 1923 to 1927 when he served as Chicago's Commissioner of Compensation, and in 1934, when he was Chicago's Commissioner of Vehicle Licenses. He served as chairman of several committees, including Rules and Finance, and was the council's President pro tempore for eight years. His 42 years on the City Council made him one of the longest-serving Aldermen in Chicago history. From 1927–1934 and 1945–1953, he was the alderman from the 25th Ward.

Bowler was chairman of the City Council's remapping committee in 1923 when it became apparent that the fairest map would redistrict him out of his own 19th Ward. Without hesitation, he proceeded to remap himself out of the City Council. Four years later, he ran in the new ward in which he found himself residing, the 25th, and won.

=== Congress ===
In 1953, he became a U.S. Representative for Illinois' 7th District. He was elected as a Democrat to the Eighty-third Congress to fill the vacancy caused by the death of Adolph J. Sabath. He was reelected to the Eighty-fourth and Eighty-fifth Congresses and served from July 7, 1953, until his death.

During his later years, Bowler suffered from arthritis and other ailments, and walked with the aid of a cane. During his final term, he was confined to a hospital bed and unable to attend House sessions, and his oath of office was administered in Chicago by Congressman Charles A. Boyle.

Bowler is considered to have been one of the five individuals most responsible for pushing through legislation that helped fund the building of the Congress Street (now Eisenhower) Expressway in Chicago. He also was instrumental in creating the Illinois Medical District in Chicago, which contains several hospitals and other healthcare providers.

== Personal life ==
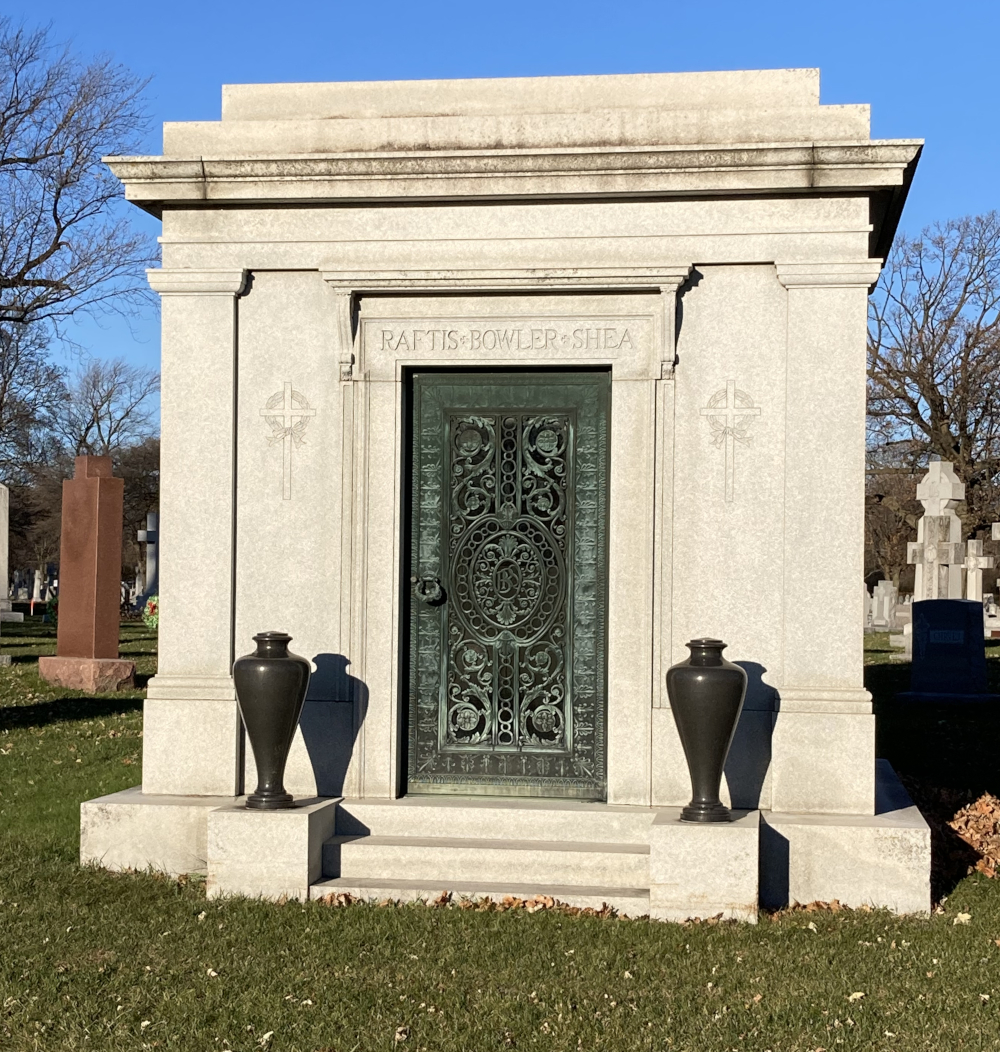
Raftis-Bowler-Shea mausoleum at All Saints Cemetery

In 1905, Bowler was appearing in Salt Lake City as a member of a bicycle racing team when he married Anastasia V. Sweeney of Chicago, who had traveled to Salt Lake City for the ceremony.

Bowler died in Chicago on July 18, 1957. He had been ill for several years following a heart attack and suffered from complications from arthritis. He was buried at All Saints Cemetery, Des Plaines, Illinois.

== See also ==
- List of members of the United States Congress who died in office (1950–1999)

== Sources ==
=== Books ===
- United States Congress (1957). Memorial Services Held in the House of Representatives and Senate of the United States, Together with Remarks Presented in Eulogy of James Bernard Bowler, Late a Representative from Illinois. Washington, DC: US Government Printing Office.

=== Newspapers ===
- "Racing Man is Caught: Cyclist James Bowler and Miss Anastasia Sweeney are Wedded". Salt Lake Herald. Salt Lake, UT. July 28, 1905 – via Newspapers.com.
- "Congressman James Bowler is Dead at 82". Chicago Tribune. Chicago, IL. July 19, 1957 – via Newspapers.com.

U.S. House of Representatives
Preceded by Adolph J. Sabath	Member of the U.S. House of Representatives from Illinois's 7th congressional district July 7, 1953 - July 18, 1957	Succeeded by Roland V. Libonati
