= Chicago strike =

Chicago strike or Chicago strikes may refer to:

- The 1905 Chicago teamsters' strike
- The 1910 Chicago garment workers' strike
- The Burlington railroad strike of 1888, against the Chicago, Burlington and Quincy Railroad
- The Chicago Newspaper strike of 1912
- The Chicago railroad strike of 1877
- The 1894 Pullman Strike, which took place in the Chicago neighborhood of Pullman
- The 1886 Haymarket affair was a May day demonstration in Chicago

== See also ==
- List of incidents of civil unrest in Chicago
- List of strikes
