= Hazel Johnson =

Hazel Johnson may refer to:

- Hazel Johnson-Brown (1927–2011), née Hazel Johnson, American nurse and educator, 1st black female general in US Army
- Hazel Johnson, character in Amy (1981 film)
- Hazel M. Johnson (1935-2011), American environmental activist
