= Fernwood Park race riot =

1947 racial conflict in Chicago, Illinois, United States

The Fernwood Park Race Riot was a race riot instigated by white residents against African American residents who inhabited the Chicago Housing Authority (CHA) veterans' housing project in the Fernwood Park neighborhood in Chicago. Area residents viewed this as one of several attempts by the CHA to initiate racial integration into white communities. The riot took place between 98th and 111th streets and lasted for three days, from the day veterans and their families moved into the project, August 13 1947, to August 16, 1947. The Chicago Police Department made almost no effort to stop the rioting, as was the case a year before at the Airport Homes race riots. It was one of the worst race riots in Chicago history.

== Subsidized housing and racialized neighborhoods ==
=== During World War II ===
Housing projects in Chicago emerged during the 1940s with the sole purpose of resolving the shortage of affordable homes for war-industry workers, many of them African American, as America prepared for World War II. As Chicago came to be a crucial steel production center for the war effort, hundreds of thousands of Black workers and their families migrated from the South to Chicago in the second wave of the Great Migration. Historian Devereux Bowly listed some alarming statistics about public housing in Chicago derived from 1940 census data: 1) 55,157 housing units were overcrowded (exceeding 1.5 persons per room), and 2) 206,103 housing units either had no access to a private bathroom or needed major repairs to interior structures. In response to these dismal conditions, the CHA opened four housing projects in low-income areas with high concentrations of war-industry workers: the Frances Cabrini Homes in August 1942, the Lawndale Gardens in December 1942, the Bridgeport Homes in May 1943, and the Robert H. Brooks Homes in March 1943. For families to live in these new projects, they needed to have at least one child; the family had to have one member working in a critical war industry (like steel); the family income had to be less than $2,000; and American citizens were preferred.

Additional housing projects for war workers built by the National Housing Agency and the Federal Public Housing Authority on the far South Side included the Altgeld Gardens project, which was constructed on a 157-acre vacant land tract in November 1943. Unlike the above projects, Altgeld Gardens contained row houses and backyards rather than crowded multi-story apartments. Similarly, the West Chesterfield project homes were commissioned by the CHA and built in December 1943. A unique project, the housing units (actual homes) are built on full city lots, and following construction, the CHA required a minimum annual income as to promote eventual homeownership for residents. While each of the projects identified presented reasonable options for war workers and their families, the end of the war would present different challenges, especially along the lines of integration.

=== After World War II ===
As African American soldiers returned from the battlefronts of Europe and the Pacific following the war, the Chicago Housing Authority (CHA) shifted the initiative from creating housing for war workers and their families to providing temporary housing for returning veterans and their families. The shift occurred in part because of the Emergency Veterans' Re-Use Housing Program, a federal law passed by Congress in 1945 that attempted to resolve the nationwide housing shortage for returning veterans. Elizabeth Wood, the executive director of the CHA, planned to integrate the temporary veterans' housing projects, as she had "absorbed [the] spirit" of both the values of United States in its efforts to combat fascism and authoritarianism abroad during World War II, and also the energy and hope of black veterans who sought to "challenge the country to live up to its wartime rhetoric about freedom." Although the goal of integration contrasted the visions of the Democratic City Council and Illinois governor Dwight Green, Chicago's mayor, Edward Kelly, was a proponent of CHA's vision for integrated veterans' housing and nondiscrimination policy.

Chicago's temporary projects were to be constructed in the fall of 1946 and set to close in July 1949. The first of these projects opened peacefully on the isolated North Side. However, the CHA's second project, the Midway Airport Homes, resulted in mass discontent and violence prior to and after black families moved in. Midway's fearful white working-class community reacted violently to the thought of black families entering the segregated neighborhood. Midway's white population overwhelmingly believed the space should be reserved for deserving white veterans. When the first black family moved into the completed project on November 16th, 1946, a white stone-throwing mob descended upon the building. After the attack, the black family requested to move out of the Midway Airport Homes, and police had to escort the black family off the premises. White aggression and mob violence successfully preserved Midway's homogenous demographic.

Bradford Hunt argues the failure of the Airport Homes integration marked a turning point for the CHA. The "racial liberalism" that CHA and Mayor Kelly promoted was directly challenged by white desire to uphold the racial purity of segregated neighborhoods. Chicago City Council members and aldermen also noticed Kelly's increased effort to maintain the CHA integration initiative over other mismanaged and corrupt areas of the Democratic political machine. To maintain the influence of the Democratic party in the city, key party leaders encouraged Kelly to retire in 1947. He was replaced by Martin Kennelly, a pro-business, anti-CHA Democrat who prioritized private real estate interests and the expansion of the downtown business district.

=== Fernwood Park Homes ===
Fernwood Park is a neighborhood in the larger Roseland community on the far south side of Chicago. Other neighborhoods in Roseland include Lilydale, Princeton Park, Rosemoor, Sheldon Heights, West Roseland, and part of West Chesterfield. In the early 1940s, the neighborhood was an ethnically mixed European immigrant community. The CHA initiated the construction of the Fernwood Park Homes, a one-story project with 87 two-bedroom-units for veterans and their families. Elizabeth Wood revealed to Fernwood Park community members in May 1947 that the project would welcome white and black veterans. Since Fernwood Park was the only remaining white neighborhood in its immediate area, white residents recognized the promise of integration as a threat to the stability of their white homogenous environment.

== Rioting ==
Unlike other race riots in Chicago history, there was no specific event or incident that sparked the rioting; Historian Arnold Hirsch suggests that the mob spontaneously organized outside of the housing project the evening after the families moved in on August 13th, 1947. Scholars have estimated that anywhere from 500 to 5,000 white rioters gathered to reclaim the neighborhood. The violence lasted three full days, during which white gangs damaged property belonging to African Americans. Rioters threw stones both the residents of the project and the project itself, shattering windows, then set fire to it. Members of the mob also pulled black people out of automobiles to beat them with clubs. Approximately 100 cars were attacked, and at least 35 black people were wounded. Police set up barricades in order to identify and isolate the area of violence, which stretched from 95th Street to 130th Street going north/south, and from Michigan Avenue to Vincennes Avenue going east/west.

=== Police response ===
Hirsch argues that police contributed to the violence against black occupants. Nearly 1,000 police officers were ordered to protect the Fernwood Park project residents, but overall, the Chicago police made almost no effort to stop or disperse organized mobs or gangs, assumedly because policemen who protected black residents were also the subject of mob violence. Additionally, the police reportedly failed to stop the motor attacks as well. Since the largest number of police officers were ordered to protect the housing project and its inhabitants, there were no available reinforcements to safeguard both the project and the black motorists. Instead of sending squad cars to the streets where violence against drivers occurred, police redirected traffic from four-lane main street Halsted Ave. to a two-lane side street only one block from Halsted, which meant that "traffic became hopelessly snarled, [and] black motorists remained within easy reach of the mob." Thus, black drivers were especially vulnerable to mob activity.

The Chicago Police Department established units at the projects in the two weeks following the riot. Nearly 700 police officers remained in the area near Fernwood Park Homes to protect black residents from any violence, and the order of police protection was not removed for nearly six months after the riot.

== Aftermath ==
=== Arrests and injuries ===
Only 113 people were arrested for rioting at the Fernwood Park Homes. Hirsch presents an ethnic analysis of the reported arrests, in which the largest European ethnicity represented was Dutch (26.3%); other ethnicities were German (14.7%), Irish (7.7%), Italian (6.5%) Scandinavian (5.6%), Polish (5.3%), and Slavic (4.4%).

Additionally, at least 35 black people reported injuries from white mob violence.

=== African American reaction to the riot ===
African American neighborhoods that surrounded Fernwood Park threatened to retaliate against the white mobs. Residents of Morgan Park, one of the neighborhoods that bordered Fernwood Park, and inhabitants of the Fernwood Homes threw stones at white people who walked past the project. Violence only deescalated when the Chicago Commission on Human Relations and Archibald Carey, Jr., an African American alderman, addressed Roseland's black population.

Additionally, the African American population in the Roseland area increased exponentially following the riot. Takei cites census data for Chicago neighborhoods to track the increase—while only 4.2% of Roseland was African American in 1940, the black population grew to represent 18.4% of the community by 1950. Statistics from the next few decades, especially 1970 and 1980, illustrate rapid white flight from the area, as in 1970 African Americans represented 55.1% of Roseland's population, and by 1980, 97.5%.

=== Political response ===
Both the Fernwood Park riot and the Airport Homes riots highlighted white intransigence and refusal to accept black integration into white spaces. The integration objectives of the CHA "proved too fragile to withstand the prejudices, preferences, and mobility of whites" who resided in segregated communities. In response to the riots, Mayor Kennelly and Chicago City Council aimed to reduce the CHA's influence and restore the Democratic party's control over housing initiatives. Thus, new policy required that CHA gain approval from the Housing Committee of City Council before beginning construction of public housing projects. Similarly, Kennelly appointed the Chicago Land Clearance Commission in 1947, ultimately removing the CHA's ability to designate land for slum clearance and renewal. Finally, Chicago public housing moved to an open occupancy agenda rather than an integration agenda. While an integration agenda actively promoted and guided the movement of black people into traditionally white areas, an open occupancy agenda encouraged black people to select housing in any areas, but integration was not a priority whatsoever.

=== Chicago police disaster response reform ===
In just a few months after the Fernwood Park race riot, the Chicago Police Department (CPD) engaged in tactical changes to ensure faster response times to crises. Quick mobilization and Plan Five, or the disaster plan, "brought 27 squad cars to a designated location in less than fifteen minutes." Riot and civil disorder control also called for the organization of special police battalions, in which a total of 660 men and 98 police vehicles could arrive at any location in Chicago on "'short notice.'" Last and most significantly, the Chicago police promoted heavier levels of policing in areas where black people were moving in at higher rates. While these reforms improved disaster response, the department failed to address racial bias in individual officers in effective ways—human relations turned to hour-long classroom training seminars that would hopefully alter the lifelong biases of officers. Without meaningful bias training, systemic racism in the department hindered the ability of CPD to limit or end race riots.

== See also ==
- Englewood race riot
- Detroit race riot of 1943
- List of incidents of civil unrest in the United States
