= Roland V. Libonati =

American politician

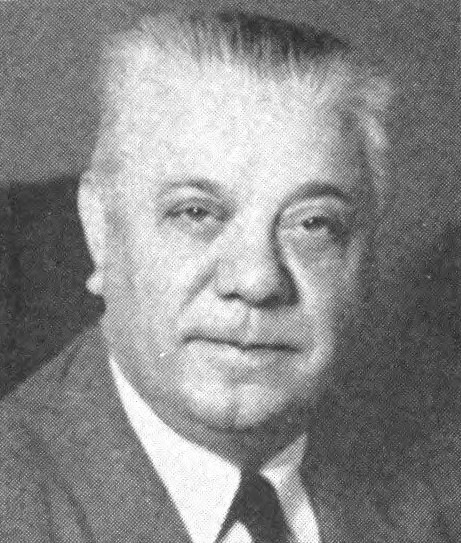
- Libonati, c. 1959

Member of the U.S. House of Representatives from Illinois's 7th district
- In office December 31, 1957 – January 3, 1965
- Preceded by: James Bowler
- Succeeded by: Frank Annunzio

Member of the Illinois Senate
- In office 1942–1947

Member of the Illinois House of Representatives
- In office 1930–1934
- In office 1940–1942

Personal details
- Born: December 29, 1897 Chicago, Illinois, US
- Died: May 30, 1991 (aged 93) Chicago, Illinois, US
- Resting place: Calvary Cemetery
- Party: Democratic
- Spouse: Jeannette Van Hanxleden (m. 1942)
- Children: 1
- Parents: Ernest Libonati (father); Flora Pellettieri (mother)
- Education: Lewis Institute; University of Michigan; Northwestern University Law School
- Occupation: Lawyer; politician

Military service
- Allegiance: United States
- Branch: United States Army
- Rank: Lieutenant
- Conflict: World War I

Roland Victor Libonati (December 29, 1897 – May 30, 1991) was a United States representative from Illinois.

== Biography ==
Libonati was born in Chicago, Illinois, the son of Ernest and Flora (née Pellettieri) Libonati. He earned an Associate of Arts degree from the Lewis Institute in 1918. During World War I, he served as a lieutenant in the United States Army. After the war, Libonati returned to school, graduating from the University of Michigan in 1921 and from the Northwestern University Law School with a Juris Doctor degree in 1924.

Libonati was admitted to the bar in 1924 and commenced law practice in Chicago. He was the founder and owner of the American Boys' Camp for indigent children at Coloma, Wisconsin, and, infamously, was also lawyer to Al Capone.

He married Jeannette Van Hanxleden in 1942, and they had one son, Michael.

He served as a member of the Illinois House of Representatives from 1930 to 1934 from 1940 to 1942, and the Illinois Senate from 1942 to 1947. He served as delegate to every state Democratic convention from 1942 to 1987.

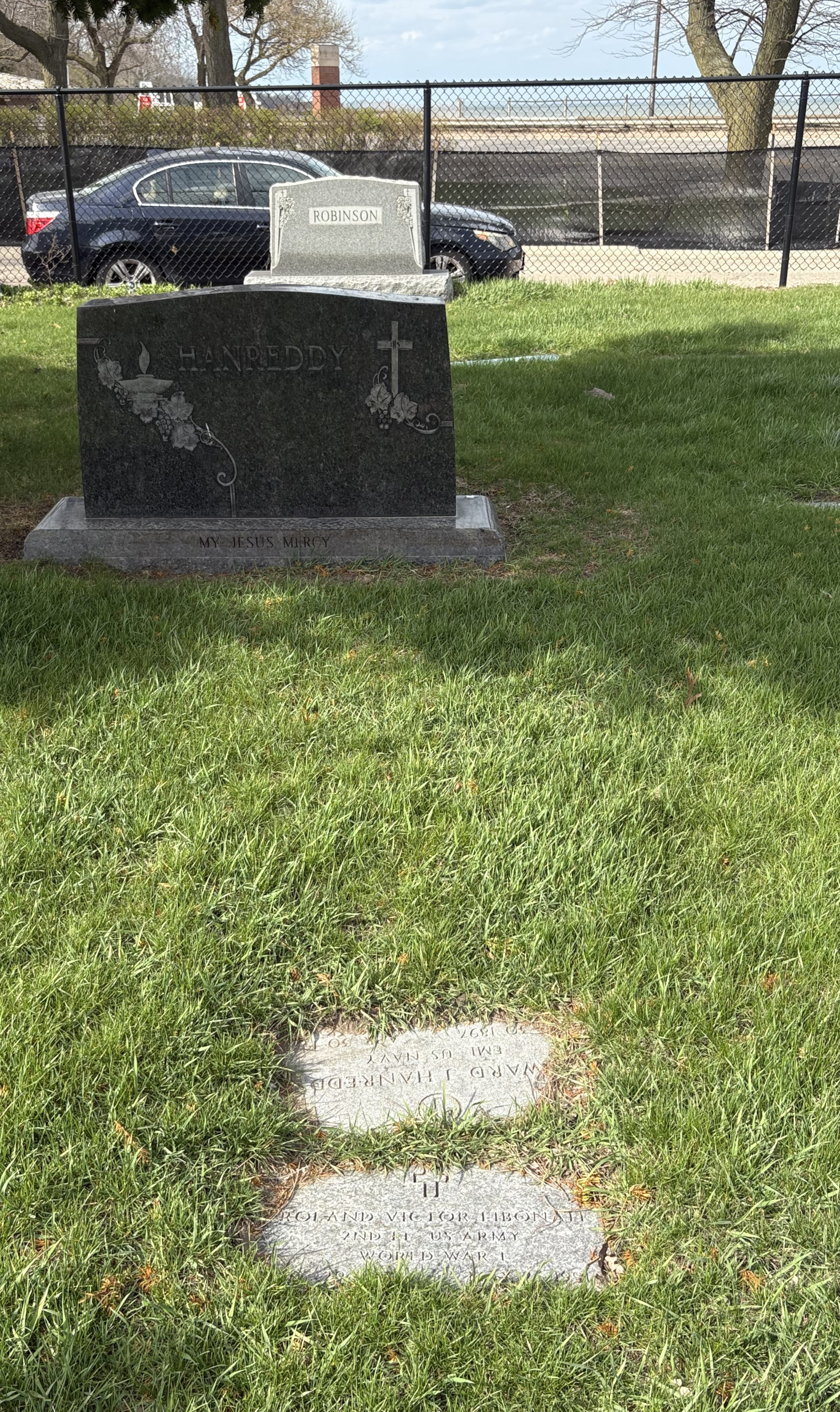
Libonati's grave at Calvary Cemetery

Libonati was elected as a Democrat to the Eighty-fifth Congress to fill the vacancy caused by the death of James B. Bowler. He was reelected to the Eighty-sixth, Eighty-seventh, and the Eighty-eighth Congresses (December 31, 1957 – January 3, 1965).

According to Todd S. Purdum's An Idea Whose Time Has Come, Libonati's political career ended as a result of his votes during the drafting of the Civil Rights Act of 1964. Libonati had been a reliable ally of Richard J. Daley's Cook County Democratic Party political machine. During the House Judiciary Committee markup on the civil rights bill, he reneged on agreements with Chairman Emanuel Celler and President John F. Kennedy, who had asked him to help weaken the bill in order to ensure it could win Republican support and pass a Senate filibuster. Libonati instead voted with liberal colleagues who wanted to maintain the bill's stronger provisions, even though Kennedy had spoken to Daley directly to complain about his behavior. In a private conversation with a colleague shortly after the vote, Libonati said he had received a call from the Daley machine indicating that his political career was over.

Libonati was not a candidate for renomination to the Eighty-ninth Congress in 1964.

Following his political career, he resumed the practice of law. He was a resident of Chicago until his death on May 30, 1991. He was buried at Calvary Cemetery in Evanston, Illinois.

U.S. House of Representatives
Preceded by James Bowler	Member of the U.S. House of Representatives from Illinois's 7th congressional district 1957–1965	Succeeded by Frank Annunzio
