= Rosario Dispenza =

Rosario Dispenza was an Italian-born American mobster. He was head of the Sicilian mafia in the Near North Side neighborhood of Chicago from 1909 to 1914.

Born circa 1870 in Ciminna, Italy, Dispenza immigrated to the United States in 1899 on board the SS Aller. He was a contact of the Morello crime family and known associate of Anthony D'Andrea.

Alongside his business partner Anthony Puccio, Dispenza co-owned the Banca Siciliana, a bank on Milton Avenue, and a saloon on the intersection of Milton Avenue and Hobbie Street. This area was colloquially referred to as the "Black Hand Belt" or "Death Corner". In 1908, Dispenza was fined $100 for allowing patrons to gamble for drinks.

On January 22, 1914, hours after Puccio was murdered outside of the saloon, Dispenza was shot and killed. Although police did not arrive in time to apprehend the assailant, a search of the area revealed two sawed-off shotguns in a neighboring alley. Police suspected that the killings may have been related to the murder of Charles Catalino, which had occurred a week prior.

Preceded by Mariano Zagone	Chicago Mafia Boss c1909-1914	Succeeded by Anthony D'Andrea
