= Saint Mary of the Assumption Church (Chicago) =

Church in Chicago, Illinois

Saint Mary of the Assumption
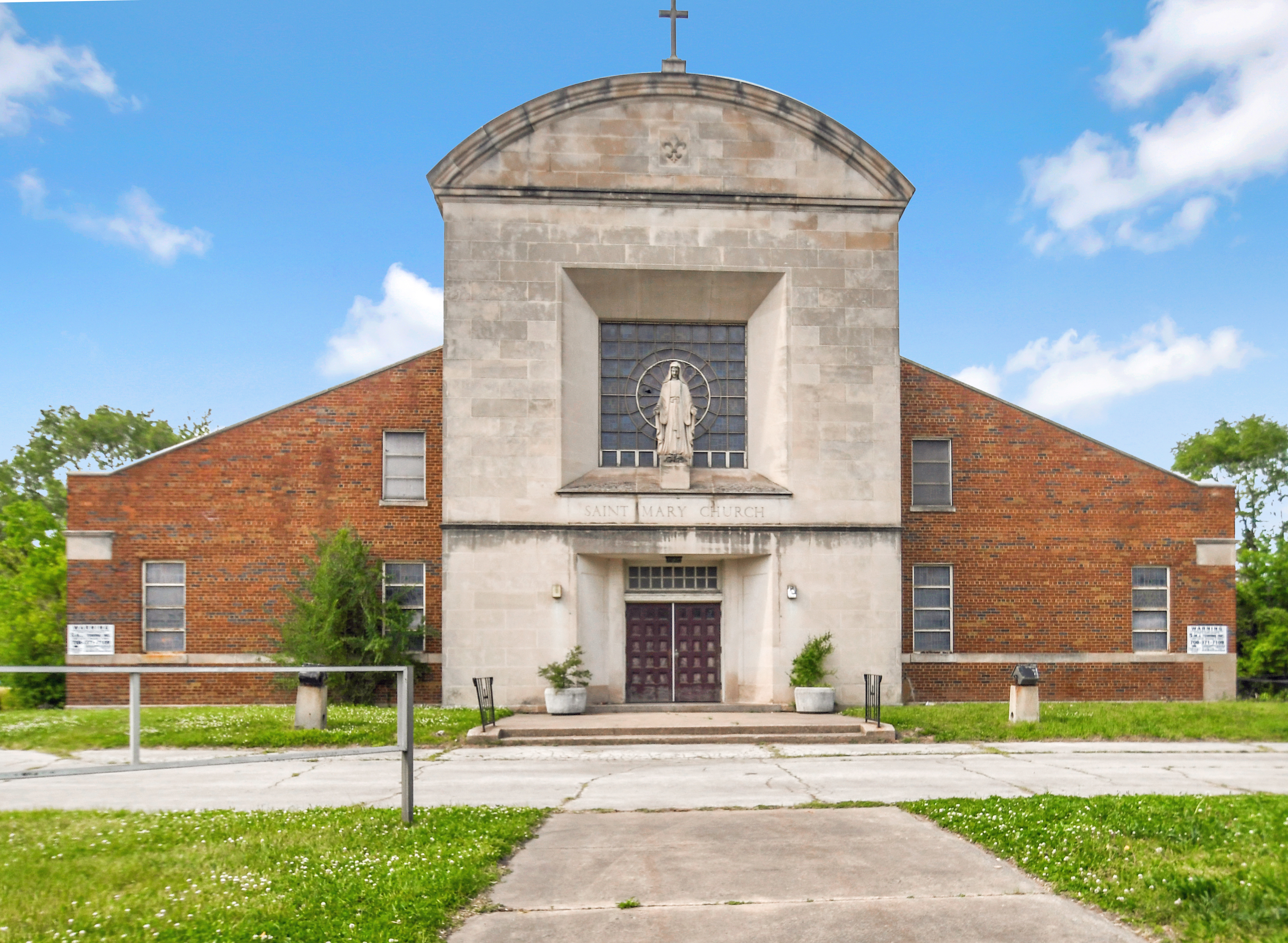
- The 1957 church building in 2025.
- Saint Mary of the Assumption
- 41.64572°N 87.61452°W
- Address: 310 E. 137th St. Chicago, Illinois
- Denomination: Catholic Church
- Sui iuris church: Latin Church

History
- Status: Closed since 2011
- Founded: 1886
- Dedicated: 1 September, 1957

Architecture
- Architect: George S. Smith
- Architectural type: Simplified Renaissance; Semi-Gothic
- Construction cost: $375,000

Specifications
- Capacity: 860

Administration
- Archdiocese: Chicago
- Parish: Christ Our Savior

Saint Mary of the Assumption Church is a vacant church building and former Catholic parish church of the Archdiocese of Chicago located in the Riverdale community area of Chicago, Illinois, United States. The parish was established in 1886. A new combined school and church building was constructed in 1917, followed by a purpose-built church—a brick-and-stone structure in a simplified Renaissance style—completed in 1957. In 2011, the parish merged with Queen of Apostles Parish in the suburb of Riverdale, Illinois. The former Saint Mary of the Assumption building has been vacant since that time. The church and its associated school were attended by Pope Leo XIV in his childhood through the 1960s, and his election as pope in 2025 has drawn renewed attention to the parish's legacy, now part of Christ Our Savior Parish.

== History ==
In 1886, approximately 30 German-American Catholic families employed in the railroad industry in the Riverdale area organized under the leadership of Nicholas Mueller, Henry Stieman, and Mathias Buechler to request the establishment of a local parish. Prior to this, community members traveled to Blue Island and Pullman to attend Mass. Archbishop Patrick Feehan approved the request and assigned Benedictine clergy to the newly formed parish. The first church building was completed in 1887, and a parish school staffed by the Poor Handmaids of Jesus Christ was established. Due to parish growth, responsibility for staffing the church was transferred to the Archdiocese of Chicago in 1903, and a rectory was constructed in 1905.

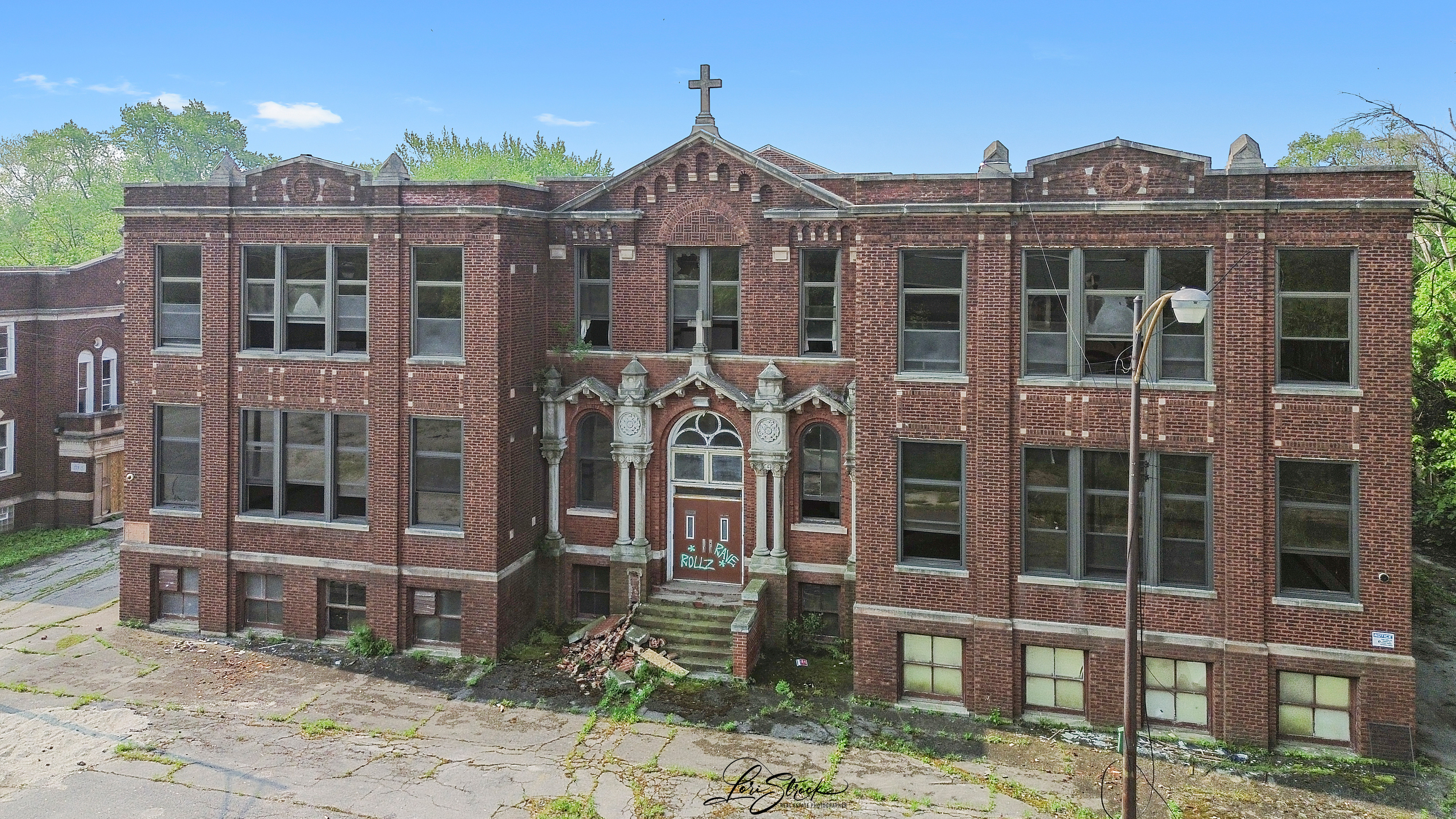
The 1917 school building in 2025

Construction of a combined church and school building began in May 1917, with the first Mass held there on Christmas morning of the same year. The school was later staffed by members of the Sisters of Christian Charity.

Following post–World War II suburbanization in the area, more worship space was needed, as the parish had grown to 1300 families. The cornerstone for the new building was laid in January of 1957. It had seating for 860 people, cost $375,000, and was described as "simple, beautiful, and devotional" upon its dedication by Cardinal Samuel Stritch on September 1, 1957.

Pope Leo XIV, born Robert Prevost, was baptised in the original church building on September 18, 1955. He received his First communion in the new church building on May 11, 1963, and was one of the senior altar servers of the congregation. He graduated from the parish elementary school in June of 1969.

=== St. Mary Queen of Apostles Parish ===
In 1978, the parish was reported to have a membership comprising approximately 2,000 families. Beginning in the 1980s, the number of parishioners began to decline. The parish school closed in 1989 due to declining enrollment. By 2011, the parish had 234 registered families. That year, Saint Mary of the Assumption Parish was merged with Queen of Apostles Parish in suburban Riverdale, Illinois to form St. Mary Queen of Apostles Parish, which was operated from the Queen of Apostles church building. The St. Mary campus was sold.

=== Christ Our Savior Parish ===
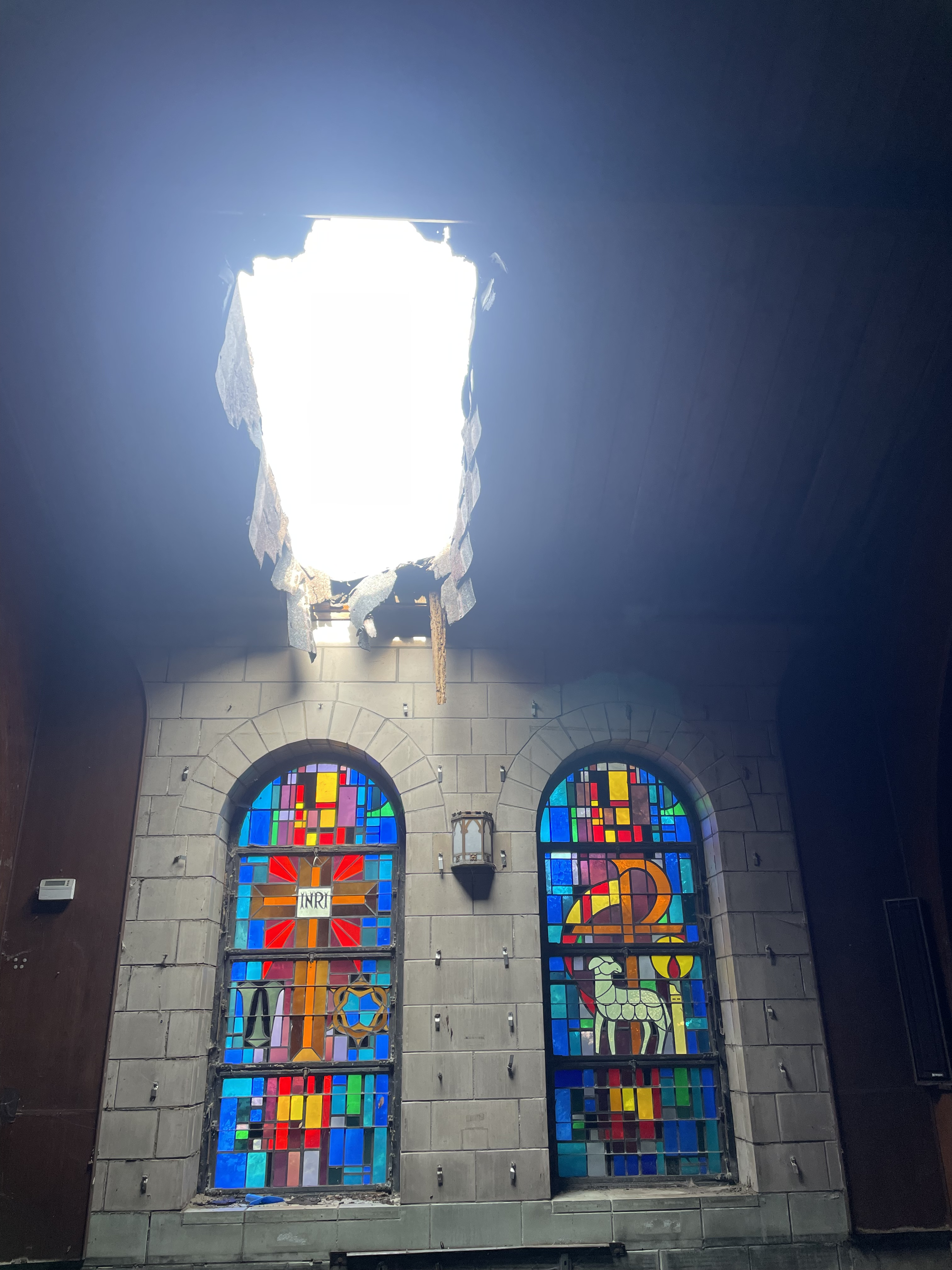
A hole in the roof of the church building in 2025.

In 2019, St. Mary Queen of Apostles Parish was further merged with St. Jude the Apostle Parish and Holy Ghost Parish, both located in South Holland, Illinois, to create Christ Our Savior Parish, which is based at the former St. Jude the Apostle church building. Following the election of Pope Leo XIV in 2025, Christ Our Savior Parish, the successor institution of St. Mary of the Assumption, experienced a surge in visitors, phone calls, and interest due to the pope's childhood connection to the parish. The parish's tabernacle, originally from St. Mary of the Assumption, remains a significant link of the current parish to its predecessors.

== Current status ==
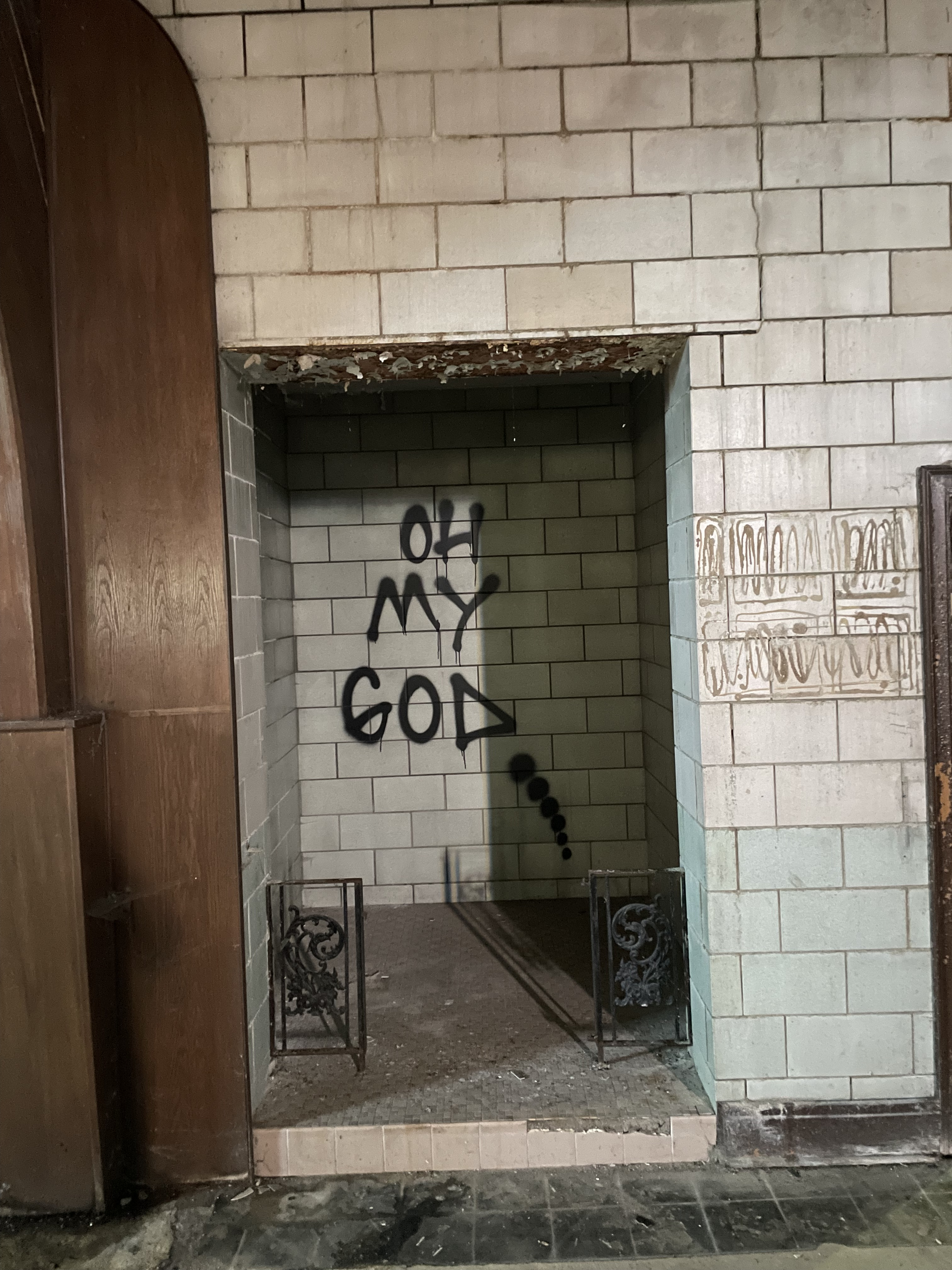
Graffiti in the building, possibly referencing an Act Of Contrition

As of 2025, the former Saint Mary of the Assumption church building showed signs of physical deterioration, including roof damage, broken windows, and water damage to its interior. The building is located in an area heavily affected by municipal disinvestment. Efforts to preserve the structure have intensified due to its historical significance and connection to Pope Leo XIV, with community members and preservationists advocating for its restoration or adaptive reuse. In May 2025, preservationists, including the group Preservation Chicago, formally requested that the Commission on Chicago Landmarks grant landmark designation to the church to protect it from demolition and support its restoration. The Archdiocese of Chicago has expressed openness to the landmark designation, citing the church's connection to Pope Leo XIV, and is exploring potential uses for the building, such as a community center or a site for pilgrimage. However, no final decision on the landmark designation or concrete plans for the building's future have been confirmed as of June 2025.
