= 1966 Chicago West Side riots =

Chicago West Side riots
- Part of the Ghetto riots
- Date: July 12–15, 1966
- Location: West Side, Chicago, Illinois
- Methods: Rioting, looting, arson, shootout, rock throwing, sniper attacks

Parties
Black residents of the West Side "Paramilitary groups"	Chicago Police Department; Illinois National Guard

Number
Initially 200	3,500

Casualties
- Deaths: 2
- Injuries: 30+
- Arrested: 200+

The 1966 Chicago West Side riots occurred between July 12 and 15 in Chicago, Illinois. After police arrested a man who was wanted for armed robbery, Black residents took to the streets in anger and looted and burned various stores throughout the West Side until the arrival of 1,200 National Guardsmen on July 15. Violence quickly subsided and most of the troops were sent home on July 20.

== Events ==
=== Beginning ===
The riots began on July 12 after an ex-Convict named William Young, who was wanted for armed robbery, attempted to evade arrest at a liquor store on the 100 block of South Pulaski road. Young ran away from officers Biaggio Panepinto and James Rizzi and began screaming that the officers were trying to kill him, attracting a crowd of around 200 people. Young was caught in an alley but the mob encircled Panepinto and Rizzi and began demanding that they release Young. Panepinto and Rizzi were eventually rescued by other officers, but the mob began to loot the liquor store, beginning the unrest on the West Side.

=== The riots ===
Unrest quickly spread throughout the West Side. On July 13, around 200 youths looted a drug store and threw stones and fired shots at police, wounding seven policemen. Several drug stores, liquor stores and supermarkets were looted and set alight, with rioters pelting responding firemen with stones. During a raid on an apartment building, 21 members of a "paramilitary group" were arrested. A police captain said he received reports the group was planning on waging guerrilla warfare and had caches of automatic weapons and explosives stashed throughout the city. At one point, services of the Lake Street Elevated train line had to be cancelled as snipers had fired at passing trains several times.

By July 15, 1,500 National Guardsmen had been deployed to patrol a 140-block area of the West Side and calm returned to the West Side, though looting and fires continued to be reported. The troops had been given orders to shoot. Over 30 people were injured during the riots, including six firemen and six policemen who had been shot. Two civilians, a pregnant 14-year-old and 28-year-old man, were killed by stray bullets from shootouts between police and snipers. More than 200 people were arrested on July 14 alone.

== Reactions ==
Martin Luther King Jr. condemned the rioting but blamed the police and the city for the riots and asked for a Black man to be named the number 2 in the Chicago police. Mayor Richard J. Daley stated that "rioting" was too strong of a term and instead referred to the events as "juvenile disturbances" and asked for religious and community leaders to call for peace. Archbishop John Cody echoed Daley's statements.

== See also ==
- 1968 Chicago riots
- List of incidents of civil unrest in Chicago
- List of incidents of civil unrest in the United States
