= Valledolmo =

Valledolmo Vaḍḍilurmu (Sicilian)
- Comune
- Comune di Valledolmo
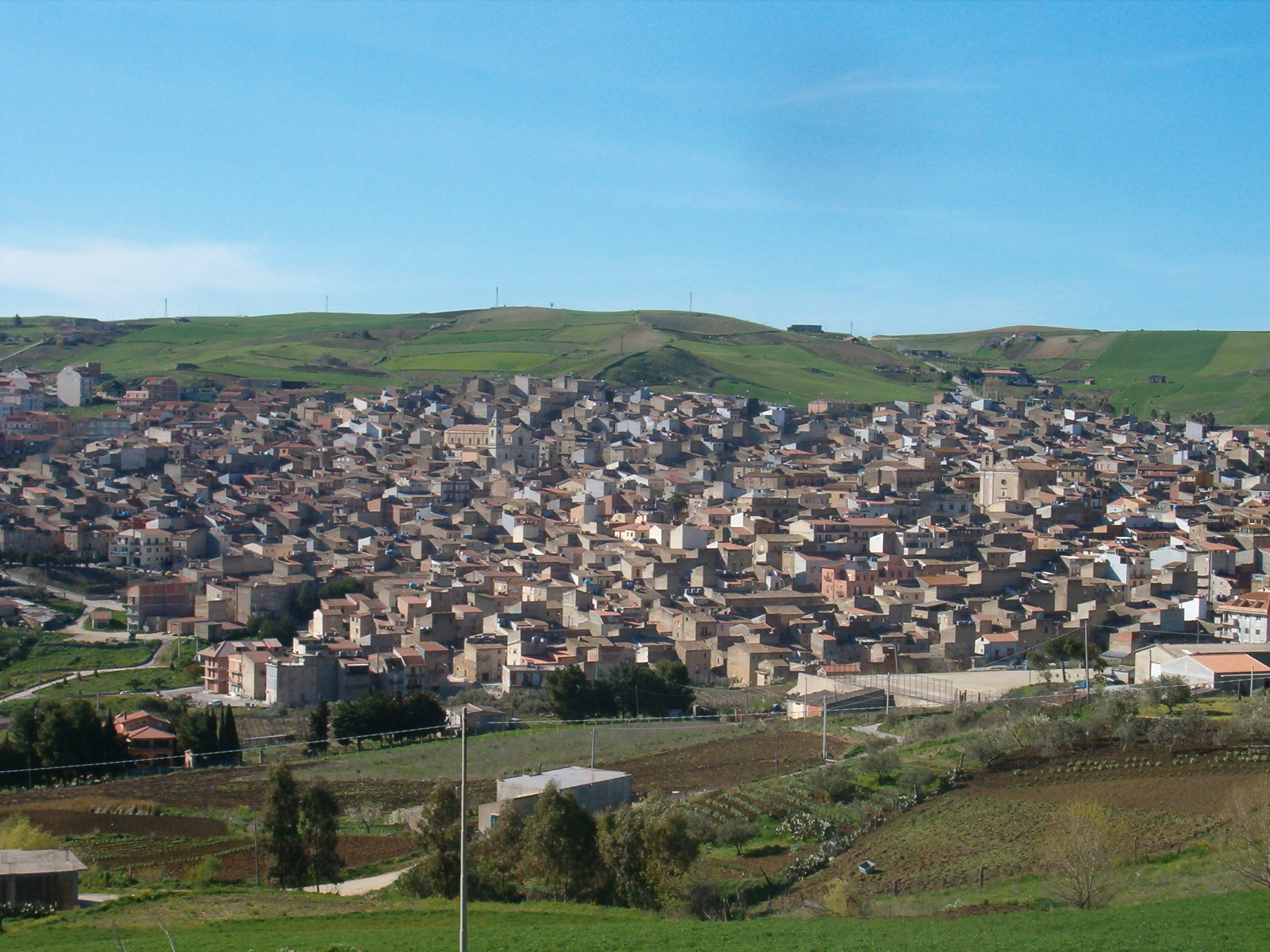

- Location within Italy Location within Sicily
- Coordinates: 37°45′N 13°50′E
- Country: Italy
- Region: Sicily
- Metropolitan city: Palermo (PA)

Government
  - Mayor: Angelo Conti

Area
  - Total: 25.8 km^{2} (10.0 sq mi)
- Elevation: 780 m (2,560 ft)

Population (30 November 2016)
  - Total: 3,557
  - Density: 138/km^{2} (357/sq mi)
- Demonym: Valledolmesi
- Time zone: UTC+1 (CET)
  - Summer (DST): UTC+2 (CEST)
- Postal code: 90029
- Dialing code: 0921
- Website: Official website

Valledolmo (Sicilian: Vaḍḍilurmu; univerbation of vaḍḍi 'i l'urmu "Valley of the Elm") is a comune (municipality) in the Metropolitan City of Palermo in the Italian region of Sicily, located about 60 kilometres (37 mi) southeast of Palermo. Valledolmo borders the following municipalities: Alia, Sclafani Bagni, Vallelunga Pratameno.

== Notable people ==
- Anthony D'Andrea, Italian-American Crime Boss
- Giuseppe DiCarlo, Italian-American Crime Boss
