= Marquette Park rallies =

In Chicago, 1960s–1980s

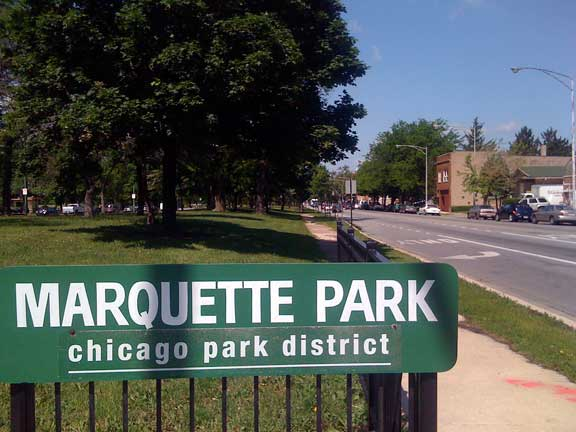
Marquette Park, Chicago, Illinois

From the mid-1960s until the late 1980s, Chicago's Marquette Park was the scene of many racially charged rallies that erupted in violence. The rallies often spilled into the residential areas surrounding the park.

== Background ==
Marquette Park is the largest park on Chicago's southwest side and is in the Chicago Lawn neighborhood. The neighborhood is also called Marquette Park by most locals.

The neighborhood was developed primarily in 1920s; it consists mostly of bungalows and single-family housing. The neighborhood developed a reputation as a "white ethnic" neighborhood, as many second-generation Americans of Irish, German, Polish and most notably Lithuanian descent moved to the neighborhood from other south side neighborhoods, such as Back of the Yards and Englewood. The latter was the site of a race riot in 1949 in which whites attacked blacks, mostly migrants and descendants from the South.

In 1960, some 53 of the neighborhood's 51,347 residents were non-white, and of those 53 residents, three were black. Some African Americans had jobs that enabled them to improve their housing, but were limited by discrimination by real estate agents and banks in getting loans, and related approvals. Marquette Park had garnered a reputation as a place black people tried to avoid. Western Avenue, the official border between Marquette Park and West Englewood, became the unofficial boundary line between black and white neighborhoods on Chicago's south side.

== Chicago Freedom Movement ==
In January 1966, Dr. Martin Luther King Jr., leader of the Southern Christian Leadership Conference and nonviolent protest, moved to a small apartment on Chicago's west side. He intended to protest and bring attention to the poor living conditions for blacks in the city in an effort to promote fair housing, as related to real estate and bank practices. He also sought to bring attention to the racial discrimination that blacks faced when trying to buy homes in such blue-collar "white neighborhoods" as Marquette Park.

On July 31, 1966, 550 white and black civil rights demonstrators, not including King, marched into Marquette Park. According to police reports, 700 white residents awaited the demonstrators. The white residents threw bricks and bottles at the protestors and burnt cars, and the Chicago Police Department appeared to do little to protect the marchers. Over 50 people were hurt and 18 cars were burnt.

On August 5, 1966, King attempted to lead 700 marchers through Marquette Park and neighboring Gage Park to a real estate office on 63rd street. King had previously led marches into white neighborhoods elsewhere in the city and been fiercely opposed. The marchers were confronted by several thousand white counter-protestors, many of whom displayed Confederate flags and swastikas. They attacked the marchers with bricks, bottles and cherry bombs while shouting racial insults. At one point King was struck in the head with a rock. He said after the march that "I have never seen — even in Mississippi and Alabama — mobs as hostile and as hate-filled as I've seen here in Chicago". The white counter-demonstrators fought with police after the marchers left. More than 40 people were arrested and more than 30 were injured over the day.

== Formation of the National Socialist Party of America ==
The violent reaction to King's efforts to demonstrate in Marquette Park attracted the attention of George Lincoln Rockwell, who traveled to Chicago to try to recruit members. Rockwell organized a "White People's March" on September 10, 1966, in Gage Park, which attracted about 300 people. This was an unusually large amount of support for Rockwell, who was rarely taken seriously elsewhere in the country. As Sean Maschmann wrote, "It took a full decade for Rockwell to gain something more than notoriety and a reputation for political titillation and buffoonery."

In 1970, Chicago native Frank Collin founded the National Socialist Party of America (NSPA) and purchased a two-story building in Marquette Park which he named "Rockwell Hall". The NSPA had a core membership of a few dozen neighborhood youths, but enjoyed some support from other locals due to their strong opposition to residential integration. Collin and the NSPA began holding rallies throughout the Chicago area. Most of them were held at Marquette Park, though they also held rallies in such suburbs such as Cicero and Berwyn, where working-class ethnic whites had settled after moving out of the city. The rallies often turned violent; groups such as the Chicago chapter of the Jewish Defense League confronted the Nazis during their rallies.

== 1976/77 clashes ==
On June 6, 1976, around 200 NSPA members and local youths gathered at Marquette Park to confront a black group that had planned to protest inadequate housing. When the black group failed to show up, the protestors started throwing bricks and bottles at police officers and passing motorists, damaging more than 200 vehicles; someone shot an off-duty officer. On July 17, 1976, between 1,000 and 1,500 residents of Marquette Park, including many NSPA members attacked around 100 activists protesting housing discrimination with bricks and bottles, while shouting "Marquette stays white" and "go home niggers". Over 30 people, including 16 policemen, were injured and over 60 arrests were made. The activists alleged the police made little effort to protect them, and at least eight off-duty Chicago police officers were believed to have been involved in the attacks on the marchers.

On August 21, 1976, around 250 civil rights activists tried again to march to Marquette Park but were stopped eight blocks short by police. Law enforcement also stopped a crowd of about 800 whites from confronting the civil rights marchers, keeping the groups apart. No injuries or serious clashes occurred, but 13 people were arrested, including two black men who fired guns into the air.

On July 23, 1977, 20 to 30 black members inspired by Martin Luther King Jr.'s legacy attempted to march into Marquette Park after an April bombing of three houses in the neighborhood that were owned by blacks. The police did not allow them to march into the neighborhood, declaring it too dangerous; when several entered anyway, they were arrested. White residents attacked black passersby, pelting cars with stones and bottles. One car containing a woman and her three children was overturned, and all four had to be hospitalized. A total of 19 people were injured and 27 arrested.

== Skokie controversy ==
In 1977, the City of Chicago passed an ordinance requiring that people wishing to demonstrate at public parks have $250,000 in insurance in order to obtain a permit. As Collin and NSPA could not afford the insurance, they began to apply for permits to march in Chicago suburbs, including Skokie, a suburb with a largely Jewish population, including Holocaust survivors and descendants. After Skokie rejected the request, Collin sued the city. The case eventually went to the Supreme Court and Collin and the NSPA won the right to rally in Skokie. But Collin agreed not to march in Skokie if the City of Chicago allowed him to hold rallies at Marquette Park again.

After the city granted the NSPA the right to return to Marquette Park, Collin held a rally on July 9, 1978. The NSPA had 25 uniformed members there, but the rally attracted around 2,000 protestors (including future Chicago mayor Rahm Emanuel) from each side, about a third of whom were locals sympathetic to the NSPA. During the rally Collin denied that the Holocaust occurred, but said that a real one was coming. Several fights broke out between anti-Nazi protestors and the local sympathizers, leading to 72 arrests.

== 1980s KKK rallies ==
=== Situation in the 1980s ===
Racial tensions on Chicago's southwest side were high in the 1980s. In 1983, Chicago voters elected their first black mayor, Democrat Harold Washington. The Republican candidate for mayor, Bernard Epton, received 48% of the vote, an unusually high percentage for a Republican candidate in a city that had historically been strongly Democratic. This campaign was racially charged. Epton used the slogan "before it's too late" in reference to Washington being a mayor; 81 percent of white residents in Chicago voted for the Republican candidate. Much of the surge in Republican support came from traditionally Democratic "white ethnic" neighborhoods on the southwest side, made up of descendants of European immigrants. By 1986, a poll concluded that 72 percent of residents of the southwest side wanted a new mayor.

The racial demographics of Marquette Park had changed significantly throughout the 1980s. The 1980 census found that the population of Marquette Park was 82% white, 11% Hispanic and 4.6% black, with six out of the nine census tracts in the neighborhood having zero black residents. Reflecting changes in residential patterns and new immigration from Latin America, by the time of the 1990 census, the neighborhood was 43% white, 27% Hispanic and 27% black, with only one census tract having no black residents.

The median value for owner-occupied by homes in the neighborhood declined by 5% during the 1980s when accounting for inflation. A total of 148 hate crimes were reported in the neighborhood between 1986 and 1991, by far the most of any neighborhood in Chicago over that time frame (Marquette Park led the city neighborhoods in hate crimes every single year).

=== 1986 ===
On June 28, 1986, around 30 members of the Ku Klux Klan and the America First Committee attempted to hold a rally at Marquette Park. In response, a black group calling themselves the "Crusaders for Justice" also organized a rally and picnic in counter protest. As the Klan members were gathering to enter the park in a flatbed truck, they were attacked with bats by members of a third group, the International Committee Against Racism (INCAR). They had no permit to rally and had disguised themselves as softball players at a second park. The Klan truck sped away, and police intervened and clashed with the INCAR members; five officers were injured and several people were arrested.

The Klan members eventually made it to the park and were met by around 400 cheering local white spectators. About 15 minutes into rally, INCAR members tried to attack Klan members again but were set on by local white spectators. Police convinced the INCAR protesters to flee along 71st street, where they were chased by whites who threw stones and bottles at them until they crossed Western Avenue. At the time this was a de facto border between white and black neighborhoods in Chicago.

In a third and final incident, around 75 members of the Crusaders for Justice group tried to enter the park for a scheduled rally. They were opposed by an estimated 3,000 white residents, some of whom shouted "get out of our park" and "nigger go home". A total of seventeen people were arrested throughout the day, and at least eleven people, including eight officers, suffered minor injuries. The following day, around 40 Klan members protested the Chicago Pride Parade at Lincoln Park. The event remained peaceful.

On August 24, a dozen black religious leaders and civil rights activists marched into Marquette Park and held a prayer for racial tolerance, while being guarded by 700 police officers. Afterward, several groups of white youths attempted to march along Marquette Road into a black neighborhood, but were stopped by police. They arrested 36 people for disorderly conduct and mob action.

=== 1988 ===
Around 500 Klan members, neo-Nazis, and other white supremacists rallied at Marquette Park on August 28, 1988. They displayed Nazi flags. More than 900 police officers kept them separate from a group of about 200 counter-protestors. Several hundred local white residents cheered on the Klan members and chanted "white power", while attempting to confront the counter-protestors. A third group of about 300 protestors held a later rally at the park to honor Dr. Martin Luther King Jr. Fourteen people were arrested throughout the day, mostly for disorderly conduct, but no violence occurred between the groups. Klan sympathizers did attempt to attack a black man wearing headphones, who had accidentally entered the Klan rally.

== Aftermath ==
=== Changing of the neighborhood ===
Throughout the 1990s, the neighborhood continued to go through dramatic demographic changes in a process of residential succession. By the 2000 Census, blacks made up 53% of the population, Hispanics (of any race) comprised 35%, and whites were 10%. As of 2010, blacks were 49% of the population, Hispanics 45% and whites 4%. There is also a small, but growing Arab community as well.

=== Legacy ===
Father Michael Pfleger, a Roman Catholic priest and prominent activist in Chicago, grew up in Marquette Park. He first became involved in social activism after being horrified by the anger, fear and violence he saw on the day of King's Chicago Freedom Movement march. On the 50th anniversary of the march, around 1,400 people, including Pfleger, marched along the same route that King and other SCLC organizers and activists had. A memorial to King was installed at the park around the time of the 50th anniversary as well.

=== Popular culture ===
- The neo-Nazis of Marquette Park were satirized in the 1980 film The Blues Brothers.
- Sara Paretsky, a writer who bases her mysteries in Chicago and especially its South Side, wrote about the Marquette Park events in 1966 in her novel Hardball (2009). Featuring a wide variety of characters, she explores the long reach of such historic events. Her protagonist V.I. Warshawski observes that the city's racial fault lines "run through my family, along with the rest of the South Side."
