= Airport Homes race riots =

Series of race riots in Chicago, Illinois, US

The Airport Homes race riots were a series of riots in December 1946 in the West Lawn and West Elsdon neighborhoods of Chicago, Illinois. It was the worst episode of racial inspired violence that the city faced in some thirty years.

"Airport Homes" was the name of the site in nearby West Lawn established by the Chicago Housing Authority to provide temporary housing to returning veterans and their families during the postwar housing shortage. Residents of West Lawn and West Elsdon rioted and succeeded in intimidating a few black war veterans and their families from joining white veterans in the homes.

The upheaval against blacks happened during the working hours while the white men were at work, which meant that the elderly and the women were the ones who started the riot.

The West Elsdon Civic Association became one of the first vocal political enemies of the CHA and its first executive secretary, Elizabeth Wood. Opposition to public housing remained strong in the area. In the early 1970s the West Elsdon Civic Association was an active participant in the "No-CHA" citywide coalition opposing scattered-site public housing in predominantly middle-class white neighborhoods.

Chicago's major newspapers published very few details about the riots at the recommendation of the city's Commission on Human Relations (CHR), who feared that excessive coverage would make the riots worse. As a result, there is very little information available on the riots. In total, the CHR recorded 357 serious incidents related to blacks moving into white Chicago neighborhoods between 1945 and 1950.

== See also ==
- Englewood race riot
- Fernwood Park race riot
