= Aldermen's wars =

1916–1921 violence in Chicago, Illinois

Date	1916–1921
Location	19th Ward, Chicago, Illinois, United States
Result	Powers and Bowler victory D'Andrea assassinated

Belligerents
Irish-American political-corruption Clique; Irish Mob	American Mafia

Commanders and leaders
John Powers; James Bowler	Anthony D'Andrea †

Casualties and losses
- 30+ deaths

The Alderman's wars was a series of murders and violent rioting between warring Alderman Johnny "de Pow" Powers and Anthony D'Andrea from 1916 until 1921. Over a period of five years, over 30 deaths were reported during the struggle for control over the "Bloody" 19th Ward of Little Italy in Chicago, US.

== Background ==
Johnny Powers, a local Irish-American saloonkeeper and longtime political boss of the predominantly Irish 19th Ward, had been in power since the 1880s and despite the large influx of Italian immigrants over the decades managed to retain power among the area despite his reputation for corruption and offering political protection to criminal elements in Chicago's underworld.

However, Powers was faced with a challenge when the Italian-American Anthony D'Andrea ran against junior alderman and Powers associate James Bowler in 1916. D'Andrea, although a defrocked priest and convicted counterfeiter, was a popular leader within the Italian-American community as a prominent member of several Italian-American fraternal organizations and as a labor union official. As reported by the Chicago Tribune, "Anthony Andrea is the name of Antonio D'Andrea, unfrocked priest, linguist, and former power in the old 'red light' district, who in 1903 was released from the penitentiary after serving 13 months on a counterfeiting charge. Dander's name has also been connected with a gang of Italian forgers and bank thieves who operated at one time all over the country."

== Violence ==
The first murder to occur took place in February 1916 when Frank Lombardi, a Powers associate and ward heeler, was shot and killed in a saloon by 17-year-old Samuzzo Amatuna. With both sides employing "election sluggers" in attempt to influence voting, violence increased as supporters from both sides would be killed in continuous fighting throughout the year. A grim practice emerged during the fighting where the names of future victims would be carved into a poplar tree at 725 S. Loomis Street later becoming known as "Dead Man's Tree".

Despite D'Andrea's defeat that year, and again in 1919, his campaign against Powers continued as violence reached its height during the 1921 campaign, with murder and bombing becoming commonplace, including the bombing of Power's home. The bombing of a political rally for D'Andrea would injure five people as well as those against D'Andrea's campaign headquarters and the home of one of his lieutenants.

In March 1921, court clerk and Powers supporter Paul Labriola was gunned down at the intersection of Halsted and Congress Street by four D'Andrea gunmen as he walked to work (Labriola had been recently listed on "Dead Man's Tree"). Later that day, the same gunmen shot and killed cigar store owner Harry Raimondi, a former D'Andrea associate who had recently defected to the Powers faction.

Powers spokesman and fellow alderman Bowler issued a public statement denouncing the violence of the D'Andrea faction.

Conditions in the 19th Ward are terrible. Gunmen are patrolling the streets. I have received threats that I was to be "bumped off" or kidnapped. Alderman Powers' house is guarded day and night. Our men have been met, threatened and slugged. Gunmen and cutthroats have been imported from New York and Buffalo for their campaign of intimidation. Owners of halls have been threatened with death or destruction of their buildings if they rent their places to us. It is worse than the Middle Ages.

== Death of D'Andrea ==
Despite announcing his retirement from politics after his third and final defeat in 1921, violence continued as, on May 11, D'Andrea was killed outside his apartment building shortly after receiving a death threat the previous month. Two more deaths would follow as Andrew Orlando and Joseph Sinacola, both of whom were Sicilian "blood brothers" to D'Andrea, were killed in July and August respectively after swearing to avenge the death of D'Andrea.

== Aftermath ==
The number of aldermen per ward was reduced from two to one in 1923, at which point Bowler stepped aside in favor of Powers. Powers retired in 1927, at which point Bowler resumed aldermanic office, and died in 1930. Bowler would serve as alderman until 1953, when he became a congressman.

== Bibliography ==
- Sifakis, Carl. The Encyclopedia of American Crime. New York: Facts on File Inc., 2005. ISBN 0-8160-4040-0
