= Racial liberalism era =

Racial liberalism is an era in American history during the 1940s that is considered by many historians as the precursor to the civil rights movement of the 1950s and 1960s.

== Causes ==
Historians contend that the era of racial liberalism had its roots in New Deal liberalism. President Franklin D. Roosevelt's New Deal programs laid out a legacy that inspired and empowered many American citizens who had fallen victim to the Great Depression to challenge the power of corporations and other institutions.

The Double V campaign is considered one of the most important events during the period of racial liberalism. The purpose of the campaign was to raise awareness about segregation and racism during World War II.

The War was also a source of racial liberalism in that previously marginalized groups of Americans were able to gain a foothold in the economy due to the need for a strong labor force. This gain in economic power translated into strong political power, and as a result, certain government actions, such as Executive Order 8802, were implemented to aid these groups.

== Basic tenets ==
There were three basic ideas to 1940s racial liberalism:

- A belief that government legislatures and courts should lend a helping hand to battle racial discrimination.
- An emphasis on "equal opportunity" legislation, such as the dismantling of legalized segregation and the establishment of anti-discrimination laws in all aspects of American life.
- The idea that race is socially constructed.

Some historians argue that though racial liberalism helped to pave the way for civil rights movements in America, it failed to recognize that people from many different ethnic backgrounds were affected by racism in the United States. Much of racial liberalist efforts emphasized "the Negro problem" – that the marginalization of African Americans in the United States should be addressed – rather than emphasizing the impacts of racial inequality for all of those affected. This prevented many racial minorities from benefiting from the fruits of racial liberalism.

Another criticism is that many proponents of racial liberalism attempted a "one-size-fits-all" solution to racism in the 1940s. This was also a failing point in that not all solutions for African-Americans were good for other non-white groups at the time.

Racial liberalism was also relatively unsuccessful in its endeavor to pressure government to step in and stop racist practices, particularly because of the limited financial resources of the United States government at the time.
