= Hazel M. Johnson =

American environmental activist

- Born: January 25, 1935; New Orleans
- Died: January 12, 2011 (aged 75); Chicago
- Organization: People for Community Recovery
- Movement: Environmental justice

Hazel M. Johnson (née Washington; January 25, 1935 – January 12, 2011) was an American environmental activist on the South Side of Chicago, Illinois. After she spoke at the first National People of Color Environmental Leadership, she was considered to be the mother of environmental justice.

== Early education and personal life ==
Johnson was born in New Orleans, Louisiana, on January 25, 1935, to Mary (née Dunmore) and Clarence Washington. She cared about her family and had a personal connection to her family's health. Johnson was the older sibling of her family and began noticing environmental health concerns. Before she and all her siblings turned one, her three younger siblings had died. Orphaned when she was 12 years old, she was sent to live with an aunt in Los Angeles. She attended Jefferson High School for two years, then returned to New Orleans to live with her grandmother.

She met her husband, John Johnson, in New Orleans and they later married. In 1955, they moved with their two children to Woodlawn, Chicago. Johnson was Catholic. While raising a family, Johnson worked a number of jobs including recruiting members to an African American neighborhood association, sorting mail for the U.S. Postal Service, and working as an administrative support for Parents and Friends of Retarded Children. The Johnsons moved to Altgeld Gardens Homes, a South Side, Chicago housing project managed by the Chicago Housing Authority, in 1962.

=== Environmental justice work ===
Altgeld Gardens was originally built to house American war veterans, but the area was surrounded by landfills, industrial buildings and sewage-treatment plants. For over fifty years, George Pullman's railroad company had put waste into the landfills and impacted more than 10,000 residents living in the Altgeld Gardens. Following the death of her husband in 1969 from lung cancer and the prevalence of skin and respiratory issues among her seven children, Johnson began investigating the impacts of the neighborhood's environmental conditions on its residents. She documented the occurrence of chronic health problems present in the community in order to better understand the impacts of the area's air and water pollution. Johnson discovered that Altgeld Gardens sat in the center of a 14-square-mile ring of pollution from Chicago's Southeast Side to Northwest Indiana, leading her to dub the neighborhood "The Toxic Doughnut". In addition to being exposed to hazardous fumes from surrounding factories and asbestos used during construction of the buildings, the community was supplied with contaminated drinking water and was found to have the highest cancer rate in the city.

Johnson's growing awareness and personal ethos about the impacts of environmental hazards on people's health began her advocacy for the Chicago Housing Authority to address the environmental injustices. She began agitating for accountability from the Chicago Housing Authority regarding their failure to properly maintain buildings and ignoring environmental hazards. She ran for and was elected to the Altgeld Gardens Local Advisory Council in 1970, remaining in the role until 1979 before founding the People for Community Recovery, an organization promoting reforms for environmental justice in the city of Chicago. PCR waged an environmental justice war for Altgeld residents.

In 1979, Johnson founded the People for Community Recovery to address tenant issues within the Chicago area. Incorporated as a not-for-profit organization in 1982, the group focused "on fighting environmental racism as it affected the residents of Altgeld Gardens public housing project." One of their first achievements was successfully lobbying the city of Chicago to test the well-sourced drinking water supplied to Maryland Manor, which demonstrated the presence of toxins, cyanide among them, in the community's water. The 1984 findings resulted in the introduction of water and sewer lines to the area.

In the mid-1980s, she discovered the housing project had been built with asbestos and PCB waste was dumped on the Altgeld Gardens site by the Chicago Housing Authority. PCR directly confronted corporations that were the main polluters such as Waste Management. In 1987, hundreds of protestors blocked the gate of Waste Management to prevent dump trucks from discharging waste into the landfill. For her efforts Johnson has been recognized as the mother of the environmental justice movement.

The Toxic Doughnut

The Toxic Doughnut were the surroundings areas of the Altgeld Gardens that had been filled with waste from the Waste Management. In 1988, Johnson did further research on the pollution that came from the waste in the landfills and cared about the rising health concerns of the residents in the South Side. Johnson found that "68 percent of the 800 residents who left the Altgeld Gardens could have their health improve." However, Johnson discovered that five years had developed into untruthful, hidden information from the Waste Management where penalties were given, but the penalties were not collected nor addressed to the Altgeld Garden communities. Johnson met with different authorities within the Environmental Protection Agency and the Center for Disease Control to ensure that the environmental injustices were addressed.

Later published in 1994, Johnson's "A Personal Story" shared her firsthand experience living within the Southside of Chicago. Johnson shared her experiences protesting with her Altgeld Garden neighbors. In her first experience, she visited the Calumet Industrial Development where eight communities participated in sit-in demonstrations. However, Johnson encountered issues being on the Waste Management's property. This led to Johnson and her neighbors going next to the Waste Management to continue their protests through holding posters and honking their vehicles. Johnson found that the Waste Management wanted to offer "twenty-five million dollars and the city of Chicago offered thirty million dollars" to continue using the landfills. Johnson did not want to accept the proposals and continued to advocate for an awareness about environmental justice.

==== People for Community Recovery ====
In 1979 Johnson founded the People for Community Recovery to address tenant issues within the Chicago area. Incorporated as a not-for-profit organization in 1982, the group focused "on fighting environmental racism as it affected the residents of Altgeld Gardens public housing project." One of their first achievements was successfully lobbying the city of Chicago to test the well-sourced drinking water supplied to Maryland Manor, which demonstrated the presence of toxins, cyanide among them, in the community's water. The 1984 findings resulted in the introduction of water and sewer lines to the area.

In 1985, Johnson led environmental bus tours for DePaul students to learn about the environmental injustices occurring within the Altgeld Gardens.

The People for Community Recovery, which continues to operate today under the leadership of Johnson's daughter Cheryl, went on to conduct multiple surveys documenting the South Side's "abnormally high rates of respiratory, pulmonary, and skin-related disease in addition to high infant death rates and cancer." Records regarding their activities spanning from 1935 to 2007 were donated to the Chicago Public Library for public use in 2009.

Cheryl Johnson became the executive director of the People for Community Recovery organization. In 2021, Cheryl helped pass the law of the Climate and Equitable Jobs Act that helped people of color to have new job opportunities in Chicago. The People for Community Recovery website continues to dedicate Hazel M. Johnson's environmental justice work and has provided timelines through Johnson's active policy changes. The People for Community Recovery's website further presents a timeline of the work that Cheryl and the team has done to keep Johnson's public memory alive, to teach neighborhoods about awareness to environmental issues, and to help provide support for safe and proper housing conditions.

== Recognition ==
Johnson mentored college students and other young activists who formed the new generation of leaders of the environmental justice movement. She mentored Barack Obama, a young community organizer at the time, to help push for the removal of asbestos from Altgeld Gardens. Johnson's daughter, Cheryl Johnson worked with her mother at the beginning of PCR's establishment and later became executive director.

In 1991, Johnson was invited to the first National People of Color Environmental Leadership Summit in Washington, D.C., where she was acknowledged as the “Mother of Environment Justice Movement”. Johnson worked with peers from community organizers across the country to create 17 Principles of Environmental Justice.

In 1994, Johnson was invited by President Clinton to witness the signing of Executive Order 12898: Federal Actions to Address Environmental Justice in Minority Populations and Low-Income Populations, which directed federal agencies to identify and address environmental effects on minority and low-income populations. Her presence at this historic moment underscored her influence in shaping federal environmental policy through grassroots activism.

In 1996, President Bill Clinton selected the People for Community Recovery as one of the top 100 environmental organizations in the country.

Johnson was given the 1992 President's Environment and Conservation Challenge award in recognition of her environmental justice work. In 2004, sociologist David Naguib Pellow credited Johnson and the People for Community Recovery with putting "the South Side of Chicago on the radar screen for activists and policy makers around the United States who are concerned about environmental racism." Of her work, Johnson explained: "It's all very well to embrace saving the rain forests and conserving endangered animal species, but such global initiatives don't even begin to impact communities inhabited by people of color."

On January 12, 2011, the Illinois General Assembly, by way of a house joint resolution, designated "the portion of 130th Street from the Bishop Ford Freeway to State Street in Chicago as the "Hazel Johnson EJ Way". The naming of the stretch was officially celebrated during a ribbon cutting ceremony on September 15, 2016.

=== Death ===
Despite her knowledge of the toxic pollutants lurking in her community, Johnson continued to live in Altgeld Gardens her entire life. She died on January 12, 2011, due to complications related to congestive heart failure.

== Legacy ==
By the establishment of PCR, Johnson had gained a narrative for herself. She joined the environmental movement, which around the 1970s was a primarily white, middle-class movement. Her name became popular around the nation as she inspired other start-up non-profits to fight legislation on their own toxic waste communities. She mentored college students and other young activists who now form the new generation of leaders of the environmental justice movement. She even mentored former President Barack Obama, a young community organizer at the time, to help push for the removal of asbestos from Altgeld Gardens. Hazel Johnson's daughter, Cheryl Johnson also worked with her mother at the beginning of PCR's establishment and now upholds her mother's role as executive director.

In 1991, she was invited to the first National People of Color Environmental Leadership Summit in Washington, D.C., where she was acknowledged as the “Mother of Environment Justice Movement”. It was described by Johnson as a dream she did not realize was one she had until it happened. At the Leadership Summit, Johnson worked with peers from community organizers across the country to create 17 Principals of Environmental Justice, that are still referenced today.

In 1994, Johnson was invited by President Clinton to witness the signing of Executive Order 12898: Federal Actions to Address Environmental Justice in Minority Populations and Low-Income Populations. This was a major day in environmental history, thanks to the work done by Johnson.

Johnson was given the 1992 President's Environment and Conservation Challenge award in recognition of her environmental justice work. In 2004, sociologist David Naguib Pellow credited Johnson and the People for Community Recovery with putting "the South Side of Chicago on the radar screen for activists and policy makers around the United States who are concerned about environmental racism." Of her work, Johnson explained: "It's all very well to embrace saving the rain forests and conserving endangered animal species, but such global initiatives don't even begin to impact communities inhabited by people of color."

On January 12, 2011, the Illinois General Assembly, by way of a house joint resolution, designated "the portion of 130th Street from the Bishop Ford Freeway to State Street in Chicago as the "Hazel Johnson EJ Way". The naming of the stretch was officially celebrated during a ribbon cutting ceremony on September 15, 2016.

Hazel M. Johnson's legacy continues through the ongoing work of People for Community Recovery, now led by her daughter Cheryl Johnson. Hazel's advocacy helped establish environmental justice as a nationally recognized movement, paving the way for future legislation and community-based activism. In 2021, U.S. Congressman Bobby Rush introduced legislation to designate April as "Hazel Johnson Environmental Justice Month" and posthumously awarded her the Presidential Medal of Freedom in recognition of her life's work. Her contributions helped transform the environmental movement into a broader struggle for racial and economic equity, and her story remains a foundational part of environmental justice history in the United States.
