= Anthony D'Andrea =

Italian-American mobster (1872–1921)

- Born: Antonio D'Andrea; June 7, 1872; Valledolmo, Sicily, Italy
- Died: May 12, 1921 (aged 48); Chicago, Illinois, U.S.
- Occupations: Priest, Translator, Politician, Gangster
- Years active: 1902–1921
- Spouse: Carolina Wagner (1899–1921)

Anthony D'Andrea (born Antonio D'Andrea; Italian pronunciation: [anˈtɔːnjo danˈdreːa]; June 7, 1872 – May 12, 1921) was an Italian-born Mafia boss of Chicago in the late 1910s to early 1920s. He was also a Democrat and a political leader who was a president of the Unione Siciliana and was involved in a heated battle for alderman. D'Andrea was killed by an assassin's bullet in 1921.

== Early life ==
D'Andrea was born in Valledolmo, Sicily, in 1872 to a large family, he studied law at the University of Palermo in Palermo, Sicily. In 1897, D'Andrea immigrated to the United States, briefly settling in Buffalo, New York. He later attended seminary at St. Mary's Academy in Baltimore and St. Bonaventura's Academy in Allegheny, Pennsylvania. In June, 1899, D'Andrea moved to Chicago, where he was ordained a priest and appointed pastor of St. Anthony's Italian (Independent) Catholic Church under Bishop Antoni Kozlowski. Kozlowski was an adherent of the Old Catholic Church. His brother Orazio (Horace) also became a priest.

In Chicago, D'Andrea met a young German woman, Carolina "Lena" Wagner. D'Andrea fell in love with Lena, left the priesthood, and married her in Milwaukee. However, after their marriage, Lena suddenly disappeared. D'Andrea suspected that the people who sheltered Lena after her parents' deaths were holding her. With help from the police, D'Andrea and Lena were reunited. Now that he was no longer a priest, D'Andrea decided to become a teacher of modern languages. His brother Louis also left the priesthood and married.

== The middle years ==
D'Andrea, because of his education, assisted other Italian immigrants with legal issues and worked as a professional translator. At some point, D'Andrea became involved with the Mafia, either in Sicily or the United States. While it is not known if there have been members of the clergy who were also Mafiosi in America, it has been known to occur in Sicily. In 1902, soon after his marriage, D'Andrea was arrested as the leader of a counterfeiting gang. After his arrest, D'Andrea initially blamed Lena for the crime. While awaiting trial, some authorities forgot that D'Andrea was in custody in Chicago and thought he had been murdered in New York City in the 1903 barrel murders. D'Andrea was convicted in Chicago and sent to Joliet State Prison. His family and supporters started a letter-writing campaign to the federal government for his release. After 13 months in prison, D'Andrea was released. D'Andrea continued to work as a translator while also increasing his power within the Mafia.

== Later years ==
In 1911, D'Andrea co-owned a company with Martin Merlo, a brother of close associate Mike Merlo, at 20 East 31st Street in Chicago. That same year Joseph D'Andrea (no relation to Anthony) was elected president of Local 286 of the International Hod Carriers' Building and Construction Union. Joseph appointed Anthony as the local treasurer and business agent. Joseph, a friend and associate of South Side Gang boss James Colosimo, allegedly introduced labor racketeering into his union. On September 16, 1914, a man walked up to Joseph and said, "I know you." As Joseph reached out to shake the stranger's hand, the man shot Joseph in the leg (other reports say the stomach) with a double-barreled shotgun. Joseph died shortly thereafter and Anthony became the new local president.

It was also around this time that he became the Mafia boss of Chicago, following the murder of the previous leader. At one point, several young men committed certain crimes without D'Andrea's permission, and he ordered their deaths. One of them, identified only as Paolinello, sought refuge in Pittsburgh with Mafia boss Nicola Gentile. Gentile persuaded D'Andrea to allow Paolinello to join the Pittsburgh crime family. Gentile would later describe D'Andrea as a terrible and fearful man.

In 1916, D'Andrea ran for the office of alderman in the so-called "Bloody Nineteenth" ward of Chicago. The Nineteenth ward, home to many Italian immigrants, suffered from a very high homicide rate, due to a large number of "honor killings" and Black Hand murders. D'Andrea's opponent was a man called James Bowler. Before election day, D'Andrea dropped out of the race because the Chicago Tribune and other local newspapers had exposed his criminal past.

In 1919, D'Andrea became president of the Chicago head chapter of the Unione Siciliana, a charitable organization dedicated to helping poor Sicilian immigrants. However, D'Andrea used the Union as another means to increase his political base. He also ran for ward committeeman in the 19th. After he was elected, the Illinois Supreme Court negated the election and D'Andrea lost the support of John Powers, one of the ward's aldermen. D'Andrea then decided to run again for alderman against Powers. Powers was an Irish saloon-keeper who had been alderman since 1888. He was popular with the Italian community, and this led to the so-called Aldermen's Wars. Murders and bombings became political weapons. The violence reached such a point that D'Andrea condemned it and dropped out of the race. In the early morning hours of May 11, 1921, D'Andrea was shot while entering his apartment, and died the next day at Jefferson Park Hospital.

Mike Merlo, who was vacationing in Italy when he heard the news, immediately ordered the assassin's murder. After his return to Chicago, Merlo became the Mafia boss and Unione Siciliana president. D'Andrea's nephew, Philip D'Andrea, later became a member of the Chicago Outfit under boss Al Capone.

== See also ==
- List of homicides in Illinois § Organized crime
- List of unsolved murders (1900–1979)

Preceded by Rosario Dispenza	Chicago Mafia Boss c. 1914–1921	Succeeded by Mike Merlo
