= Englewood race riot =

1949 race riot in Chicago, Illinois

- Date: November 8–12, 1949
- Location: Englewood, Chicago, Illinois
- Caused by: Rumors that Jews, communists, and Black people were planning to take over the neighborhood
- Methods: Rioting, mob assaults, rock throwing

Parties
Chicago Police Department	White residents of Englewood

Number
Unknown	Up to 10,000

Casualties
- Injuries: 13+

The Englewood race riot, or Peoria Street riot, was one of many post-World War II race riots in Chicago, Illinois, that took place in November 1949 outside the home of the Jewish labor leader Aaron Bindman. The 1952 US Supreme Court case Beauharnais v. Illinois upheld the conviction of Joseph Beauharnais, an instigator of the riot, on the grounds that he was guilty of defaming entire groups, namely Jews and Black people, for being communists, violating an Illinois state libel law.

== Origin ==
According to labor historian Rick Halpern, the UPWA (United Packing Workers of America) were holding an interracial union meeting at the home of Aaron Bindman (a member of the CIO's longshoremen's union), Louise Bindman, and Bill and Gussie Sennett. The neighbors were disturbed by the presence of the attending Black shop stewards and insisted they leave the area, and when Bindman refused this request, two days of rioting began. Although one hundred policemen were on the scene, the crowd almost destroyed Bindman's home because they concluded that he was a communist because he was Jewish. This is a very interesting and perhaps overlooked flash point in the history of the civil rights movement because it marks a place where the struggles of labor moved beyond the plants and into the larger community, where they joined forces with other activist organizations. Indeed, the UPWA quickly emerged at the forefront of community-wide mobilization. They publicized and formed a committee that brought considerable pressure to bear upon Mayor Kennelly, who flatly refused to make any statement about the disturbance, demanding that he ensure adequate police protection. A well-publicized move to research mayoral impeachment prompted Kennelly to issue a statement and meet with the commissioner of police. The committee also helped expose the exploitative practices of banks and real estate companies that were promoting and profiting from "White flight."

As with many race riots across the country, the ferocity of this particular incident in Chicago was exacerbated by rumors that Black people were moving into the neighborhood; supposedly a house at 5643 S. Peoria St. was being purchased by a Black person. White non-Jews were also targeted as communists (dreaded agitators) in the frenzy of nativist insecurity.

== The riot ==
Hundreds of Whites gathered outside the home where the meeting was being held on the night of November 8. At about 9:30 p.m., a young boy threw a rock at the house, and others in the crowd followed. The rioting lasted for five days, with police doing little to stop the violence and essentially encouraging more violence at times. Whites in the neighborhood beat Black people and White people whom they believed to be outsiders or communists. At least thirteen people were beaten severely enough to be hospitalized.

== See also ==
- Airport Homes race riots
- Fernwood Park race riot
- List of incidents of civil unrest in the United States
