= John Powers (Illinois politician) =

American politician

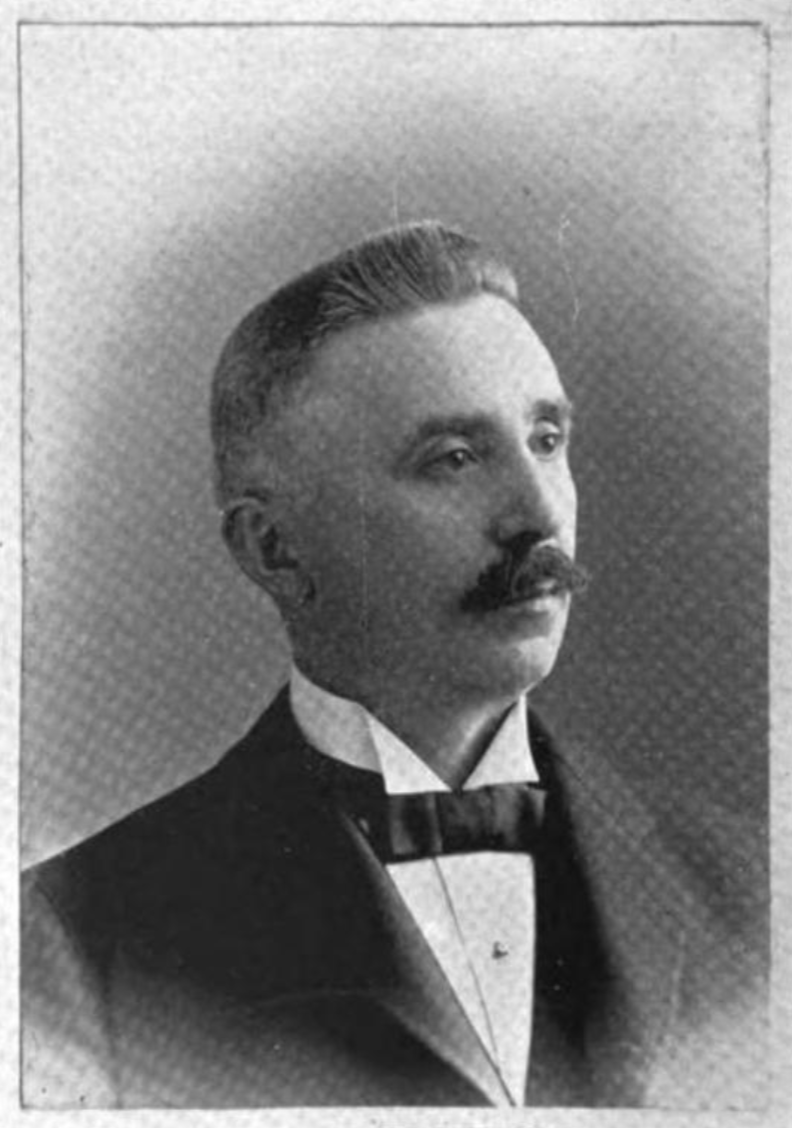

Chicago Alderman from the 19th ward
- In office 1905–1923
- Preceded by: William J. Moran
- Succeeded by: Donald S. McKinlay
- In office 1888–1904
- Preceded by: constituency re-created
- Succeeded by: Fred D. Ryan

Personal details
- Born: February 15, 1852 Brenor, County Kilkenny, Ireland
- Died: May 19, 1930 (aged 78) Chicago, Illinois, U.S.
- Party: Democratic
- Spouses: Mary Farrell (m. 1880; died 1917); Mayme Larrabee McKenna (m. 1918; died 1925); Frances Lawler Wolff (m. 1926)
- Children: John F. Powers, Thomas Powers, Mrs. John E. McNichols, Mrs. George Moxley

John Powers (February 15, 1852 – May 19, 1930) served as an alderman in Chicago, Illinois (1888–1903, 1904–1927), for the Democratic Party. He was known as Johnny De Pow by his constituents. Along with Bathhouse John Coughlin and Hinky Dink Kenna, Powers was considered one of the leaders of the "Gray Wolves" of Chicago politics.

== Early career ==
Powers arrived in Chicago in 1872 and began working as an apprentice to a grocer. After opening his own grocery store, he added a tavern next to it and used his exposure there to begin a political career as a ward captain. In 1888, Powers ran for alderman of Chicago's 19th ward and won, after which he closed his grocery, but continued to run his saloon, eventually going into business with fellow alderman, William O'Brian. They opened a larger saloon which included gambling.

== Jane Addams ==
Powers introduced the practice of distributing free turkeys, ducks, and geese to voters at Christmas, but his inability to keep his ward clean of garbage or maintain the schools led Jane Addams to target him. Addams also focused on Powers' corruption, citing instances of cronyism and bribery. Powers, in turn, used Addams's attacks on him to brand her as anti-Catholic, but he also hired her to be the ward's garbage inspector, the only paying job she ever held.

== State Senate ==
In 1903, Powers ran against incumbent Peter F. Galligan for the state senate. During the campaign, Galligan showed up at Powers's home and attacked him with a brickbat. Powers won the election, but the following year he returned to Chicago and was reelected to serve as the 19th ward alderman, a position he retained until 1927. By the 1910s, the ethnic makeup of his ward had begun to change. Instead of being 90 percent Irish, it was only about 50 percent Irish, with the remainder being made up of Italian and Jewish immigrants.

== The Alderman Wars ==
On September 28, 1920, a bomb exploded at Powers' home at 1284 Macalister shortly after he arrived. This proved to be the opening salvo in the 1921 aldermanic election. In 1921, Anthony D'Andrea, whom Powers had supported for ward committeeman in 1919, but pulled his support after the Supreme Court negated D'Andrea's initial victory, challenged Powers for his seat as alderman. The election was marked by violence, which continued after Powers won the election by 381 votes. Shortly after the election, D'Andrea was assassinated. This election was the culmination of the Aldermen's Wars.

== Death ==
Powers died at his home at 6038 Sheridan Road, on May 19, 1930, suffering from pulmonary edema and anemia, although he had been suffering throat tumors since 1929.

== See also ==
- List of Chicago aldermen since 1923
