= Altgeld Gardens Homes =

Public housing development in Chicago, Illinois

Altgeld Gardens-Phillip Murray Homes
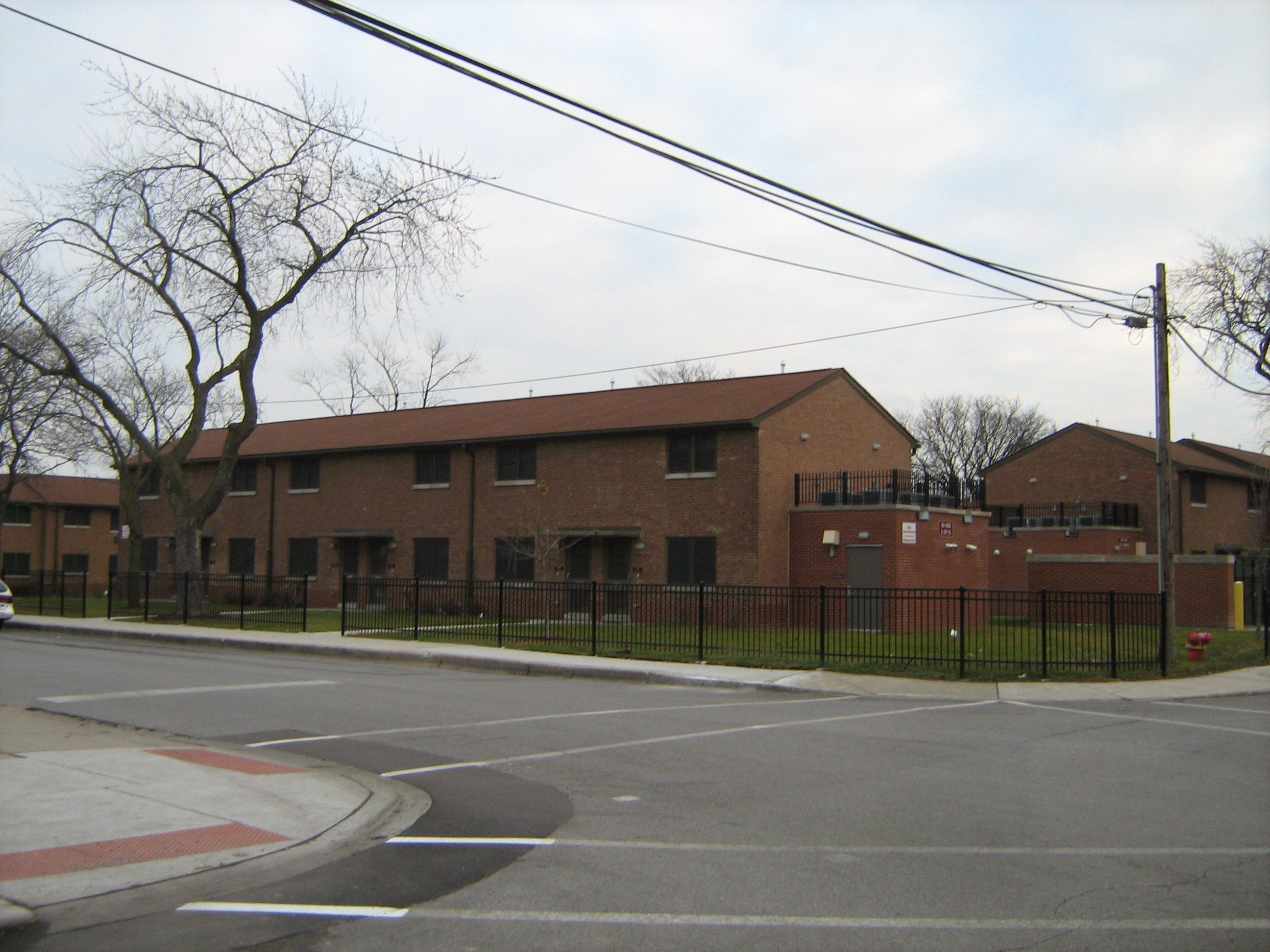
- 2009 photograph of the Altgeld Gardens housing project.
- Interactive map of Altgeld Gardens-Phillip Murray Homes

General information
- Location: Bounded by 130th and 134th Streets and S. Doty and St. Lawrence Avenues; Chicago, Illinois, United States
- Coordinates: 41°39′19.08″N 87°36′10.80″W
- Status: 1,541 units (renovated)

Construction
- Constructed: 1944–45

Other information
- Governing body: Chicago Housing Authority
- Altgeld Gardens–Philip Murray Homes Historic District
- U.S. National Register of Historic Places
- U.S. Historic district
- Location within Illinois
- Location: East 130th, East 133rd, and East 134th Sts., East 130th and East 133rd Pls., Sou, Chicago, Illinois
- Area: 1 acre (0.40 ha)
- NRHP reference No.: 100007590
- Added to NRHP: April 13, 2022

Altgeld Gardens Homes is a Chicago Housing Authority (CHA) public housing project on the far south side of Chicago, Illinois, United States, on the border of Chicago and Riverdale, Illinois. According to the 2000 United States census, 97% of the residents are African-American. Built between 1944 and 1945 with 1,498 units, the development consists primarily of two-story row houses spread over 190 acres (0.77 km^{2}).

== History ==
Altgeld Gardens was built by the Department of Housing and Urban Development to satisfy the need for improved housing for African American veterans returning from World War II. In 1956, the project was transferred to the Chicago Housing Authority. Located in an industrial area on Chicago's far South side, Altgeld was named after John Peter Altgeld, an Illinois governor in the 1890s. As one of the first public housing developments ever built in the United States, it is eligible to be listed in the National Register of Historic Places.

In the early 21st century, 3,400 residents live in the Altgeld / Murray complex. This complex includes public schools within its borders, and the Housing Authority has maintenance staff, on-site social services, and medical facilities for residents. Altgeld Gardens' northern boundary is 130th Street, its southern boundary is 134th Street, the eastern boundary is the campus of George Washington Carver Military Academy (formerly known as George Washington Carver Area High School) a public 4-year public high school and the Beaubien Woods Forest Preserve of Cook County.

Altgeld Gardens is regarded as the birthplace of the environmental justice movement.

=== Toxic Donut ===
Altgeld Gardens was nicknamed Chicago's 'toxic donut' due to having the highest concentration of hazardous waste sites in the United States. There were 50 landfills and 382 industrial facilities surrounding the area, including the Acme Steel plant and the Pullman factory, with many of the sites unregulated. There were also 250 leaking underground storage tanks. The sites surrounded rivers and lakes, making the water quality toxic for human consumption and recreation. Toxicology studies revealed high and dangerous levels of lead, mercury, dichlorodiphenyltrichloroethane (DDT), polychlorinated biphenyls (PCBs), polycyclic aromatic hydrocarbons (PAHs), heavy metals, and xylene. Residents were exposed to hazardous fumes from nearby factories and asbestos in construction material for tile and insulation. The drinking water was contaminated and had the highest cancer rate in Chicago.

These factors contributed to health burdens in the community through water and air pollution, including asthma and respiratory illness. There was a chemical odor in the air that stung residents' noses. The water had a light bronze color and came through the water pipes with little to no pressure. A survey found that 51% of pregnancies in 1992 reported birth abnormalities.

=== People for Community Recovery ===
In 1979, Hazel M. Johnson, a resident of Altgeld Gardens, mobilized community members to speak up against the environmental injustices and environmental racism her community faced and created the People for Community Recovery. The level of conflict and mobilization peaked in the 1980s and 1990s, where one of their first environmental victories was successfully lobbying the city and state to install water lines and sewer lines for Maryland Manor, home to many senior citizens. The residents of Maryland Manor were paying city taxes for 25 years for contaminated water extracted from wells where a film of chemicals such as cyanide floated on top.

In 1980, the People for Community Recovery organized a grassroots campaign in the project to advocate for the removal of fiberglass and asbestos insulation from the complex flats. Former US President Barack Obama participated in this campaign during his early years as a local community organizer and wrote about his experience in his memoir, Dreams from My Father.

The People for Community Recovery continued to protest to improve the conditions of their community. The group successfully made companies accountable to clean up the pollution they created on the environment. A company that once utilized electrical transformers had to clean up oil the machinery burned. Operators of the Pullman Company railroad cars had to properly dispose sludge waste from former operations. The organization also trained Chicago Housing Authority workers focusing on the Altgeld Gardens' development on environmental lead dust reduction during the apartment's renovation period in 2002. The People for Community Recovery began to see improvements in their environment, although there were still issues that needed to be addressed.

The work of Hazel Johnson and the People for Community Recovery influenced President Clinton to sign Executive Order 12898 which called for the Environmental Protection Agency to incorporate environmental justice principles into their work so that no groups of people may be disproportionately burdened by the consequences of pollution.

== Existing conditions ==
Altgeld Gardens is a 99% minority public housing community hosting 8,000 community members, 90% of whom are black and 63% of whom are living below the poverty line. There is the highest percentage of people living in poverty and the lowest per capita income in the city. In 2015, the community's per capita income was $11,515 compared to the poverty threshold of $12,082.

Numerous manufacturing plants, steel mills, landfills, and waste dumps border the 190 acre Altgeld Gardens site. The residents have a growing concern about the number of deaths annually from cancer and other diseases that may be related to environmental hazards of their industrial neighborhood. The community's status as low-income and minority gives them less political clout that enables toxic conditions to thrive. However, community organizing such as through the People for Community Recovery is making positive steps towards environmental justice. According to Cheryl Johnson, the head of People for Community Recovery, health problems of the Altgeld Gardens community include lead poisoning, asthma, bronchitis, and other respiratory diseases. Although most of the lead contamination stemmed from lead-based paint, there is lead contamination in the soil.

The only roads connecting the community to the wider street network are Indiana Avenue and 130th Street, both of which have incomplete or nonexistent sidewalks. This means it is nearly impossible to safely travel to neighboring areas on foot, forcing the deeply impoverished residents to depend upon bus service or private vehicles for nearly all travel. The complex and its surrounding area are a severe Food desert: there are no restaurants or grocery stores within a mile of its boundaries, and reaching supermarkets in other neighborhoods requires crossing several highways, rivers, and large multi-track railway lines.

In 2013, the 55th Mayor of Chicago Rahm Emanuel eliminated the city's Department of Environment due to budgetary concerns. This provides less government help toward alleviating environmental burdens on communities, particularly communities of color. Therefore, the People for Community Recovery are still actively organizing to clean up their neighborhood for healthier living conditions. For example, the organization started programs and workshops to teach community members on lead poisoning prevention to share with their friends and neighbors. One topic discusses nutrition, as fatty foods can increase the absorption rate of lead in children's blood.

=== Community Air Management Program ===
Starting in August 2017, the Altgeld Gardens community began a community air management program to record toxic air levels in the area to influence government to make policy changes. Data recorded will help inform residents to make decisions about community mobilization and influence policy change, especially when lack of government funding prevents government entities from doing so.

=== Solar and Green Jobs ===
In May 2018, the Chicago Housing Authority signed a $145,000 contract to develop and implement a solar and energy efficiency training curriculum for residents to promote entrepreneurship and self-sufficiency. In October of the same year, the city of Chicago called for developers to construct a solar farm on a brownfield next to the community. This project is part of a city initiative to build ground-mounted solar farms on 30 acres of brownfield land on several sites across the city to work toward 100% renewable energy power for public housing The Future Energy Jobs Act will provide money and resources to this project, as part of the Act's allocation of $750 million funds programs that provide training for new energy jobs, such as solar installers and efficiency auditors.

The implementation of solar and green jobs stemmed from the organizing work of the People for Community Recovery. The organization hopes to decrease unemployment rates, as the unemployment rate for Riverdale is five times the citywide average. Community members that are employed commute over an hour per trip. Providing jobs nearby the community will cut commute times and increase employment rates.

=== Issues ===
In 2017, the Trump administration proposed a 31% budget cut for the Environmental Protection Agency, which would lay off 19% of the current workforce. Without proper funding, the EPA cannot fund programs aimed to lower carbon emissions to reduce the impact on climate change and protect air and water quality. Programs aimed to clean up regional pollution such as Lake Michigan bordering Chicago would lose an estimated $427 million for spending. Superfund site program funding would drop from $762 million to $330 million. The EPA's enforcement division would also see a 31% cut, rendering a loss for environmental justice pursuits as the enforcement division has the power to fine companies that pollute. In addition to budget cuts, Head of the EPA Scott Pruitt has proposed to remove the environmental justice program within the EPA.

Without the help of the EPA, the community is left to collect data to show proof of health burdens and the need for policy change.

On December 19, 2018, the Federal Lead Action Plan was unveiled that provides a model for reducing childhood lead exposures. The Plan is under the President's Task Force on Environmental Health Risks and Safety Risks to Children, which was established by President Clinton through Executive Order 13045 in April 1997 There is an emphasis on childhood health due to the neurological, immunological, and digestive development during these critical years. Exposure to lead can have long-term consequences, and children have high risks of exposure. Minority children, in particular, are disproportionately burdened of lead exposures. The goals are to:

- Goal 1: Reduce Children's Exposure to Lead Sources
- Goal 2: Identify Lead-Exposure Children and Improve Their Health Outcomes
- Goal 3: Communicate More Effectively with Stakeholders
- Goal 4: Support and Conduct Critical Research to Inform Efforts to Reduce Lead Exposures and Related Health Risks

However, experts on childhood lead exposure point out the Plan's failure to fully commit to the elimination of lead poisoning, provide concrete timelines, improve federal standards and regulations to speed up intervention times, specify which environmental groups and public health advocates they will gather input from, and specify where the funding comes from In fact, the word "eliminate" fails to appear in the action plan report compared to the task force's 2016 report, which included primary prevention, environmental justice, and the elimination of lead poisoning. Experts also point out that the 2018 Plan calls to re-evaluate lead contamination reports that have already been studied rather than collect data from new areas. Which is a symptom of the underlying lack of commitment by the city and surrounding businesses to "eliminate" childhood lead exposure; and many of the other health and access issues on the South Side.
