= List of mass shootings in the United States in 2022 =

Mass shootings in the contiguous United States in 2022
Mass shootings in Alaska in 2022
Mass shootings in Hawaii in 2022
Mass shootings in Puerto Rico in 2022
Mass shootings in the United States Virgin Islands in 2022

This is a list of shootings in the United States that occurred in 2022. Mass shootings are incidents involving several victims of firearm-related violence. The precise inclusion criteria are disputed, and there is no broadly accepted definition.

Gun Violence Archive, a nonprofit research group that tracks shootings and their characteristics in the United States, defines a mass shooting as an incident in which four or more people, excluding the perpetrator(s), are shot in one location at roughly the same time. The Congressional Research Service narrows that definition to four or more killed and excludes the injured who survive. The Washington Post and Mother Jones use similar definitions, with the latter acknowledging that their definition "is a conservative measure of the problem", as many shootings with fewer fatalities occur. The crowdsourced Mass Shooting Tracker project applies the most expansive definition: four or more shot in any incident, including the perpetrator.

A 2019 study of mass shootings published in the journal Injury Epidemiology recommended developing "a standard definition that considers both fatalities and nonfatalities to most appropriately convey the burden of mass shootings on gun violence." The authors of the study further suggested that "the definition of mass shooting should be four or more people, excluding the shooter, who are shot in a single event regardless of the motive, setting or number of deaths."

== Definitions ==
- Stanford University MSA Data Project: three or more persons shot in one incident, excluding the perpetrator(s), at one location, at roughly the same time. Excluded are shootings associated with organized crime, gangs or drug wars.
- Mass Shooting Tracker: four or more persons shot in one incident, at one location, at roughly the same time.
- Gun Violence Archive/Vox: four or more shot in one incident, excluding the perpetrators, at one location, at roughly the same time.
- Mother Jones: three or more shot and killed in one incident at a public place, excluding the perpetrators. This list excludes all shootings the organization considers to be "conventionally motivated" such as all gang violence and armed robberies.
- The Washington Post: four or more shot and killed in one incident at a public place, excluding the perpetrators.
- ABC News/FBI: (Note: The FBI does not use the "mass shooting" term but uses a broader term, "mass murder" when four or more victims are slain, in one event, at one location, not including the perpetrator.) four or more shot and killed in one incident, excluding the perpetrators, at one location, at roughly the same time.
- Congressional Research Service: four or more shot and killed in one incident, excluding the perpetrators, at a public place, excluding gang-related killings and those done with a profit-motive.

Only incidents considered mass shootings by at least two of the above sources are listed below. Many incidents involving organized and gang violence are included.

== List ==
A number n in brackets indicates that it was the nth mass shooting in that community in the year.

Date	Community	State	Dead	Injured	Total	Description
December 31	Mobile	Alabama	1	9	10	A shooter opened fire in Mobile, Alabama, shooting 10 people, 1 fatally.
December 31	Phoenix (11)	Arizona	0	9	9	Nine people were wounded in a shooting at a business.
December 30	Humble	Texas	2	2	4	Two men were found deceased near a car in an intersection and two others were wounded after an apparent argument escalation.
December 28	Dallas (9)	Texas	0	6	6	A person opened fire, wounding six adults.
December 28	New York City (20)	New York	1	3	4	One person was killed and three others were wounded outside a deli in the Crotona Park East neighborhood of The Bronx when an assailant opened fire on mourners during a vigil to a victim of gun violence.
December 27	Washington (10)	District of Columbia	0	4	4	Four men were wounded in the Southeast after an afternoon shooting, at least one of the wounded was a bystander.
December 27	Columbus (6)	Ohio	0	5	5	Multiple shooters opened fire at a pajama party, wounding two teenagers and three adults.
December 27	Eureka	California	2	2	4	A couple was killed inside their home and two others were injured by a gunman.
December 26	New Orleans (11)	Louisiana	2	4	6	A person opened fire, shooting six people, two fatally.
December 24	Columbus	Mississippi	1	4	5	A man was killed and four other adults were wounded in the late evening after an argument escalated.
December 23	Wichita	Kansas	2	2	4	Two adults were killed and two wounded at a house party in the evening.
December 19	Lake City	Florida	0	5	5	Five teenagers were wounded in an afternoon shooting. They were found in two separate groups.
December 18	Oklahoma City (2)	Oklahoma	0	4	4	A shooter opened fire at a farmers market, wounding four people.
December 17	Atlanta (12)	Georgia	2	3	5	Two teenagers were killed and two others and a child wounded after a dispute that began on social media escalated. An armed group arrived at an apartment complex in the Greenbriar neighborhood and began shooting inside, with another group returning fire.
December 17	Houston (12)	Texas	1	3	4	An argument inside The Oak bar in the Third Ward led to one person killed, and three others wounded.
December 16	Valdosta	Georgia	2	2	4	Two people were killed and two injured after a man opened fire in an apartment building, he later turned himself in.
December 16	Dallas (8)	Texas	0	5	5	Five teenagers were wounded in a drive-by shooting at a 7-Eleven in Eastfield.
December 16	Memphis (8)	Tennessee	0	5	5	Five people were critically wounded in a shooting at an apartment complex.
December 16	Chicago (45)	Illinois	2	2	4	Four students were shot, two fatally, outside Benito Juarez Community Academy in the Pilsen neighborhood in the west side.
December 15	Los Angeles (9)	California	0	4	4	Four people were wounded and attempted to flee in a motor vehicle in South Los Angeles, and then involved in a car accident.
December 13	Rochester	New York	1	4	5	One person was killed and four others injured after someone opened fire in a large gathering to create a memorial for a murder victim.
December 12	New York City (19)	New York	0	4	4	Four people were wounded in a drug related shootout in the NYCHA Mott Haven Houses complex in the Bronx.
December 11	Chicago (44)	Illinois	3	1	4	Three adults were killed and one wounded at a birthday party inside Vera Lounge in Portage Park in the northwest side. The fight spilled onto the street and someone opened fire.
December 9	Phoenix (10)	Arizona	1	3	4	A man was killed and three others wounded in an evening shooting in South Phoenix.
December 8	Detroit (12)	Michigan	0	4	4	Four people were wounded in an apparent targeted attack after two cars pulled up outside the Westin Book Cadillac Hotel and opened fire.
December 8	New Orleans (10)	Louisiana	0	4	4	Four people were wounded in a shooting outside a Dollar Tree in the Gentilly neighborhood.
December 6	New York City (18)	New York	0	4	4	Four people, including three teenagers, were wounded in a shooting in the West Farms neighborhood in the Bronx.
December 6	Macon	Georgia	3	1	4	Three teenagers were killed and a fourth injured at an apartment complex after two shooters reportedly ambushed one of the victims.
December 4	Zion	Illinois	0	5	5	Five teenagers were shot inside a home on Horeb Avenue.
December 1	San Antonio (7)	Texas	0	4	4	Four adults were wounded after getting into an argument at a local car-wash after meeting to sell items.
November 30	Lake Charles	Louisiana	0	8	8	Eight people were wounded at the VVS1 Hookah Lounge.
November 27	Tallahassee (2)	Florida	1	4	5	One person was killed and four others were injured when a shooter opened fire in the outdoor basketball court of Florida A&M University.
November 27	New Orleans (9)	Louisiana	0	5	5	Five people were wounded on Bourbon Street.
November 26	Atlanta (11)	Georgia	2	4	6	Two people were killed and four others wounded when two shooters opened fire on a bridge in the Atlantic Station neighborhood. All those involved were teenagers.
November 26	Chicago (43)	Illinois	2	2	4	Four people were shot, two fatally, just after midnight in the West Pullman neighborhood in the south side.
November 25	Riverside	California	4 (Note: Including the perpetrator)	0	4	A Virginia sheriff's deputy traveled to Riverside, California, and killed the mother and the grandparents of a 15-year-old he tried to sexually extort online, before committing suicide.
November 25	Atlanta (10)	Georgia	1	3	4	One man was killed and two others and a teenager were wounded after they engaged in an attempted robbery, after the home owner exchanged gunfire the victims.
November 24	Costa Mesa	California	1	4	5	Road rage stemming from a traffic collision on Bay Street led to a shooting that killed one person and four others wounded.
November 24	Houston (11)	Texas	2	2	4	A gunman invaded the home of his ex-wife in the Spring Branch neighborhood and began shooting. Two people were killed, and two others wounded including a teenager.
November 23	Temple Hills	Maryland	0	4	4	Four people, including three teenagers, were wounded in a shooting outside a strip mall on Iverson Street.
November 23	Philadelphia (26)	Pennsylvania	0	4	4	Four students were wounded in a drive-by shooting near Overbrook High School in West Philadelphia.
November 22	Lake Belvedere Estates	Florida	2	2	4	Two adults were killed and two others wounded at a home in the early morning near Palm Beach International Airport.
November 22	Chesapeake	Virginia	7	4	11	2022 Chesapeake shooting: An assailant killed six people including one teenager and injured four others before turning the gun on himself at a Walmart located at Sams Cir. The shooter was the night-shift manager of the Walmart who worked there for 12 years.
November 20	Kingfisher County	Oklahoma	4	1	5	At a marijuana farm, four people were murdered and a fifth was injured in an execution-style shooting. The shooter was sentenced to life in prison in 2024.
November 20	Dallas (7)	Texas	0	4	4	Four people were shot after an argument in the parking lot of a billiards hall in the Oak Cliff neighborhood.
November 20	Yazoo County	Mississippi	1	6	7	At 12:41 a.m., a person opened fire during a game of dice at a bonfire at Wells Place Farm.
November 19–20	Colorado Springs (5)	Colorado	5	19	24	Colorado Springs nightclub shooting: Five people were killed and 25 others injured, 19 by gunfire, in a shooting inside Club Q, a gay nightclub. Six additional people were injured in the chaos. The shooting happened just before midnight of Transgender Day of Remembrance.
November 19	Washington Park	Illinois	1	3	4	A thirteen-year-old boy was killed and three of his friends wounded in an afternoon drive-by shooting.
November 18	Chesterfield County	Virginia	4	0	4	A woman and her three children were killed in a domestic dispute inside a house on Laurel Oak Road. The shooter was given 13 life sentences in 2024.
November 17	Cabo Rojo	Puerto Rico	2	2	4	A shootout between suspected drug smugglers and Customs and Border Protection agents resulted in three agents being shot, one fatally. A suspected drug smuggler was also killed.
November 16	Phoenix (9)	Arizona	5	0	5	A gunman killed his wife and three children in a domestic dispute before turning the gun on himself.
November 13	Charlottesville	Virginia	3	2	5	2022 University of Virginia shooting: A gunman opened fire on the main campus of the University of Virginia, killing three people and wounding two others before escaping.
November 13	Memphis (7)	Tennessee	0	4	4	Four people were wounded in a shooting near Sheffield High School in Parkway Village. The crime violated the Gun-Free School Zone Act.
November 13	Omaha (3)	Nebraska	1	7	8	Eight people were shot, one fatally, at a large gathering early in the morning on Ames Ave and 33rd St.
November 13	Philadelphia (25)	Pennsylvania	0	4	4	An argument at a nightclub led to a shooting of four people on Wyoming Ave near D St in the Feltonville neighborhood of North Philadelphia.
November 13	Halifax County	North Carolina	1	6	7	An argument between a group of women at a large bonfire party at the Double D Ranch led to gunfire leaving seven people wounded, one fatally. Among the injured was a teenager.
November 12	Fort Worth (4)	Texas	0	4	4	Four people were shot inside an apartment complex near NW Centre Drive and Buda Lane.
November 12	Indio	California	1	3	4	Four people were shot, one fatally, at Lilac Court and Golden Rod Drive.
November 11	Jersey City (2)	New Jersey	0	4	4	Four people were wounded in an afternoon shooting.
November 7	McAllen	Texas	0	4	4	A man opened fire and wounded four neighbors, including a teenager, after a dispute over palm fronds escalated. The man reported the shooting to police and claimed self-defense after he was assaulted by the neighbors.
November 6	Chicago (42)	Illinois	0	5	5	Five people were wounded shortly after midnight at a birthday party in Archer Heights on the Southwest Side.
November 6	Tulare	California	0	5	5	Five people were shot during a dispute over the outcome of an illegal drag race near Avenue 208 and Road 84.
November 6	Chicago (41)	Illinois	1	3	4	One person was killed, three others wounded in a shootout between a group of people and a security guard outside the Hush Chicago nightclub in the River North district.
November 6	Jordan Township	Pennsylvania	4	0	4	Three people were killed in two separate locations in the area of routes 239 and 118. The shooter was later killed by state troopers.
November 6	Buffalo (4)	New York	0	4	4	Four people were shot and wounded inside a party venue at 30 E Amherst St.
November 5	Philadelphia (24)	Pennsylvania	0	9	9	Nine people were shot and wounded by multiple shooters indiscriminately firing upon a crowd standing outside Jack's Famous Bar in the Kensington neighborhood.
November 5	Gainesville	Florida	0	4	4	Four people were wounded in a shooting outside a grocery store at 500 SW 2nd Ave.
November 4	La Plata	Maryland	5	0	5	Five adults were found dead inside a Maryland home Friday, sheriff's officials said.
November 4	Orange County	Florida	4	1	5	A four-year-old girl and three women were found shot to death in an Orange County home early Friday after another woman ran to a neighbor's house for help, according to the sheriff. The suspect, 23-year-old Shavell Jordan Jones, was found with a self-inflicted gunshot wound and was taken to the hospital, where he was undergoing surgery, the sheriff said.
November 4	Chicago (40)	Illinois	0	4	4	Four men were wounded in Humboldt Park after being approached by four others, who opened fire, while standing outside.
November 2	Hattiesburg	Mississippi	2	3	5	Five people were shot, two fatally, on the 100 block of W 5th St.
November 1	Denver (7)	Colorado	1	5	6	Six people were shot, one fatally, in a drive-by shooting on E. Colfax Ave and Verbena St.
November 1	East St. Louis	Illinois	2	3	5	Five people were shot, two fatally, at around 1:20 a.m. at the intersection of North 10th Street and St. Louis Avenue, after a fight broke out.
November 1	Baltimore	Maryland	0	4	4	Three adults and a teenager were wounded in an evening shooting in Carrollton Ridge.
October 31	Kansas City (4)	Missouri	1	6	7	Seven teenagers were wounded, one killed, when several uninvited adults opened fire after being asked to leave a high school Halloween party.
October 31	Chicago (39)	Illinois	1	13	14	At least 14 people were shot, one fatally, in a drive-by shooting in the East Garfield Park neighborhood during a vigil balloon release. Three of the victims were children, one as young as three. Another victim suffered injuries related to the shooting.
October 30	Aurora (2)	Colorado	4	0	4	Four people were killed in a domestic dispute. Two of the victims had filed a restraining order against the shooter earlier in the week. The shooter was given 4 life sentences in 2024.
October 30	Charleston (3)	South Carolina	0	4	4	Four teenagers were wounded in an early morning shooting at an apartment complex.
October 30	Philadelphia (23)	Pennsylvania	0	6	6	Six people were shot during an argument outside Trilogy Nightclub in the Northern Liberties neighborhood.
October 30	Memphis (6)	Tennessee	1	3	4	One person was killed and three others injured in an early morning shooting near a parking lot.
October 29	Tallahassee	Florida	1	9 (Note: Including at least one of the perpetrators)	10	Nine people were shot, one fatally, during a shootout outside Half Time Liquors on W Pensacola St. One shooter was later shot by police.
October 29	Orlando (3)	Florida	0	6	6	Six people inside the Toxic Lounge nightclub were shot in a drive by shooting.
October 28	Toledo	Ohio	2	2	4	Two people were killed and two injured shortly before midnight at an after hours club.
October 28	Pittsburgh (3)	Pennsylvania	0	6	6	Six people were shot by multiple assailants outside a church in the Brighton Heights neighborhood during a funeral service for a person who was involved in a triple shooting two weeks prior that killed two bystanders. All six victims are expected to be okay.
October 27	Broken Arrow	Oklahoma	8	0	8	A couple and their six children were found deceased after reports of a house fire, in an apparent murder suicide.
October 26	Lubbock	Texas	4	0	4	A teenager and three adults were killed and their home later set on fire in the early morning.
October 25	Hamilton	Ohio	2	2	4	Two men were killed and an adult and child wounded in an evening shooting.
October 24	Greensboro (2)	North Carolina	2	4	6	A teenager and adult were killed and four others wounded after gunfire erupted at a block party.
October 24	St. Louis (5)	Missouri	3	4	7	2022 Central Visual and Performing Arts High School shooting: A gunman shot and killed two, injured four at Central Visual and Performing Arts High School, then was fatally shot by police. Three additional people were wounded in the evacuation and chaos.
October 24	Chicago (39)	Illinois	1	3	4	A man was killed and three others wounded after a drive-by shooting in the Little Village neighborhood.
October 23	Brownsville	Texas	0	5	5	Five people were wounded after someone opened fire at a cookout in the early morning.
October 23	Chicago (38)	Illinois	3	2	5	At least five men were shot, three fatally, when gunfire erupted at an intersection taken over by a drag-racing caravan of more than 100 cars in the Brighton Park neighborhood in the southwestern part of the city.
October 23	Milwaukee (10)	Wisconsin	0	4	4	A teenager and three adults were wounded in an early morning shooting.
October 22	Milwaukee (9)	Wisconsin	0	6	6	Six people were wounded in an early morning shooting.
October 22	Oxford	North Carolina	0	6	6	Four adults and two children were wounded in a downtown evening shooting.
October 22	Phoenix (8)	Arizona	1	7	8	A gunman opened fire during a house party in Southwest Phoenix. At least one man was killed and seven others were injured.
October 22	Cordele	Georgia	0	4	4	Four people were wounded after a shooter opened fire at a restaurant. He was later arrested.
October 21	Cleveland	Mississippi	1	3	4	One person was killed and three others wounded.
October 21	New Orleans (8)	Louisiana	1	3	4	One person was killed and three injured during an evening shooting in the St. Roch neighborhood.
October 21	Baton Rouge	Louisiana	0	11	11	A shooting injured 11 people at a fraternity house near Southern University's campus during its homecoming festivities.
October 21	Hartland	Wisconsin	6	0	6	A man shot and killed his wife and four children before setting their apartment on fire and taking his own life.
October 20	Cleveland (4)	Ohio	0	5	5	Five people were wounded after shooter entered a barbershop and opened fire, before fleeing in a vehicle.
October 17	Woodbridge	Virginia	4	0	4	Four adults were found deceased by officers responding to a call of gunshots at a home. An adult who lived in the home was later arrested as a suspect.
October 16	El Paso	Texas	1	3	4	An adult was killed and three others were wounded at a shopping center where a large crowd had gathered. The suspect was later arrested, and both the deceased and suspect were members of the armed forces at Fort Bliss.
October 16	Atlanta (9)	Georgia	0	4	4	Four people were injured in a shooting at a homecoming party at Clark Atlanta University.
October 16	Lancaster	California	0	4	4	Four people were wounded after gunfire erupted at a local apartment complex.
October 16	Harrisonburg	Virginia	0	8	8	An adult opened fire at a crowd during an early morning party near the James Madison University, and wounded eight.
October 15	Denver (6)	Colorado	1	7	8	A teenager opened fire at an early morning house party, killing one and injuring seven other teenagers.
October 15	Pittsburgh	Pennsylvania	3	1	4	Three people were killed and one wounded in a shooting in East Allegheny.
October 15	Worcester	Massachusetts	0	6	6	Six people were wounded in an early morning party at a warehouse, with several taken to hospitals by friends.
October 15	Freeport	New York	0	4	4	Four teenagers were injured in a drive-by shooting outside a house just before midnight.
October 15	Itta Bena	Mississippi	2	7	9	Two people were killed and seven injured shortly before midnight.
October 14	Philadelphia	Pennsylvania	0	4	4	Four people were wounded shortly after midnight, near an intersection.
October 13	New Bern	North Carolina	0	4	4	Two adults and two teenagers were wounded in a home at night.
October 13	Raleigh	North Carolina	5	2	7	2022 Raleigh shootings: Five people were killed and two wounded after a teenager went on a shooting spree in his neighborhood.
October 13	Lanett	Alabama	0	6	6	Responding officers found six wounded people.
October 10	Delano	California	2	2	4	Two people were killed and two injured in an afternoon drive-by shooting.
October 10	Inman	South Carolina	5	0	5	Five people were killed in a shooting inside a home over the weekend.
October 9	Okmulgee	Oklahoma	4	0	4	Okmulgee bicycle murders: Four men were killed and dismembered inside a salvage yard on West 20 Street and South Madison Avenue before being thrown over the Deep Fork River.
October 9	Miami (4)	Florida	1	3	4	A man was killed and three others wounded in a drive-by shooting outside a home.
October 9	Jacksonville	Arkansas	1	3	4	One man was killed and three others were injured in an evening shooting.
October 9	Tampa (2)	Florida	1	6	7	One person was killed and six injured in the early morning outside a local bar. Two groups had been escorted outside after a fight broke out, and the fight escalated after one left during the fight and returned armed.
October 9	Beaumont (2)	Texas	0	5	5	Five people were wounded in the early morning in the parking lot of a local hookah bar and lounge.
October 8	Berkeley	California	1	3	4	One person was killed and three injured near UC Berkeley's campus after a fight escalated in the early morning. None of the victims were students.
October 8	Hurtsboro	Alabama	2	2	4	A couple were killed in an early morning shooting inside their home, where two others were wounded.
October 8	St. Joseph	Missouri	0	4	4	Four people were wounded after exiting a college party shortly before midnight in a drive-by shooting.
October 7	Portland (5)	Oregon	0	4	4	In the early morning four people were wounded, after they had won money from a lottery machine and an individual with a gun had attempted to rob them.
October 7	Fort Worth (3)	Texas	4	0	4	Four people were killed inside a SUV in the Morningside neighborhood, during a potential drug deal. The SUV reportedly pulled up alongside a waiting Challenger, and a passenger exited the Challenger and entered the SUV with the shooting began shortly after.
October 6	Louisville (3)	Kentucky	0	4	4	Four people were wounded during an evening shooting at Petersburg Park in Newburg.
October 6	Washington (9)	District of Columbia	0	4	4	Four people were shot near Tyler House Apartments in Northwest D.C..
October 5	Baytown	Texas	2	3	5	A shooter involved in a dispute on the side of the road, shot and killed an adult and wounded three others. The shooter was later wounded by responding police and died at the hospital.
October 4	Lafayette (2)	Louisiana	4	0	4	A shooting spree in Lafayette Parish left three people dead, with the suspected shooter then committing suicide.
October 2	Nashville (3)	Tennessee	0	4	4	Four people were wounded in an evening shooting in East Nashville.
October 2	Seattle	Washington	0	4	4	Four people were wounded while outside a local bar.
October 1	Oakland (5)	California	2	2	4	2022 Oakland party shooting: Two teenage brothers were killed and two other teenagers were wounded at a house party in the evening.
October 1	Philadelphia (21)	Pennsylvania	0	4	4	Four men were wounded after an early morning shooting in Frankford.
September 30	Tulsa (2)	Oklahoma	1	3	4	A student was killed and another student, an adult, and child were wounded after a homecoming football game at McLain High School.
September 30	Marks	Mississippi	0	5	5	Five people were wounded after someone opened fire during an afterparty for a homecoming football game. Multiple others were wounded while attempting to flee the area.
September 29	McGregor	Texas	5	1	6	Three adults and two teenagers were killed by a gunman who was later wounded and arrested by responding officers.
September 28	Uniontown	Alabama	0	5	5	Five people were wounded in the evening.
September 28	Columbus (5)	Ohio	0	5	5	Five people were wounded in the early morning at a gentleman club after an argument broke out and escalated.
September 28	Baltimore (12)	Maryland	0	4	4	Four adults were wounded around midnight near a Northeast Baltimore apartment complex after a social gathering.
September 28	New York City (17)	New York	0	4	4	Five hours after the previous NYC mass shooting, four people were shot and wounded in front of a building in Harlem.
September 28	New York City (16)	New York	0	4	4	Four bystanders, including two teenagers, were wounded in a shooting between two people at London Plane Tree Skate Park in Ozone Park, Queens
September 28	Oakland (4)	California	1	5	6	2022 Oakland school shooting: Four staff members and two students were shot by multiple gunmen at a complex that houses multiple schools. The shooting may have been tied to gang violence. One of the victims, died from his wounds in November 2022.
September 27	Goldsboro	North Carolina	0	4	4	Responding officers found four people wounded after a ShotSpotter alert.
September 27	Jacksonville (2)	Florida	0	4	4	Four men were wounded by gunfire after two people approached them and opened fire.
September 27	Philadelphia (20)	Pennsylvania	1	4	5	A 14 year old was killed and four others injured in a shooting while watching a football scrimmage at Roxborough High School.
September 25	Harrisburg	Pennsylvania	0	4	4	Four people were wounded during a late night party after an altercation escalated.
September 25	Hammond	Indiana	1	3	4	Responding officers found four people in the early morning with one person dying at the scene.
September 24	Columbus (4)	Ohio	1	3	4	A man was killed and three others wounded in the late evening outside of a motorcycle club.
September 24	Louisville	Georgia	1	3	4	Four people were wounded during a large block party with multiple weapons shot during the event.
September 22	Chicago (37)	Illinois	0	4	4	Four men were wounded in Douglas on the South Side after a person approached them and opened fire.
September 20	Mount Vernon	New York	0	4	4	Four people were wounded during an evening vigil.
September 20	Niles	Michigan	2	3	5	A 15-year-old girl and an 18-year-old woman were killed and three others were wounded when a group of people approached a house and opened fire.
September 19	Swainsboro	Georgia	1	3	4	One person was killed and three wounded after an argument between the two groups escalated. One group reported left and returned armed and opened fire, resulting in a shootout.
September 18	Kenosha (3)	Wisconsin	2	2	4	Two men were killed and two more wounded at a local bar. The bar has been the scene of other shootings in the past month.
September 18	Allendale	Michigan	0	4	4	Responding officers to a noise complaint near Grand Valley State University were then notified of shots fired near the location. At arrival they heard more gunfire and found four wounded, including two students.
September 18	Chicago (36)	Illinois	2	2	4	Four people were shot, two fatally while sitting on a porch on the South Side after a man pulled up and opened fire after exiting the vehicle.
September 18	Sunrise Manor	Nevada	0	5	5	Five people were wounded at an early morning backyard birthday party. One person was initially targeted, with an additional four wounded when the crowd subdued the shooter.
September 18	New York City (15)	New York	1	3	4	Four people were shot, one fatally, in a drive-by shooting on 41st St and Warren St in Elmhurst
September 17	Minneapolis (9)	Minnesota	0	6	6	Six people were injured in two shootings minutes apart from each other between 400 block and 800 block of Hennepin Avenue in downtown Minneapolis.
September 17	Blue Springs	Missouri	0	5	5	Five people were wounded on US 40 Highway while ridding motorcycles in an apparent argument that escalated.
September 16	Milwaukee (8)	Wisconsin	0	5	5	Police discovered four individuals wounded after a fight escalated. A fifth wounded individual was later identified at a local hospital and later arrested.
September 14	Milwaukee (7)	Wisconsin	0	4	4	Four people were wounded in the early morning near the Brady Street bar district.
September 14	North Miami	Florida	0	5	5	Shortly before midnight five people were wounded.
September 14	Los Angeles (8)	California	0	4	4	Four people were wounded near San Julian Park in Skid Row.
September 13	Chicago (35)	Illinois	2	7	9	Two people were killed and seven injured during an evening shooting in Washington Park after an argument escalated at a local park.
September 13	Oakland (3)	California	0	4	4	Four people including two bystanders were wounded after gunfire erupted, during a vehicle collision involving moving and parked cars.
September 12	Oklahoma City (1)	Oklahoma	0	4	4	Four people were wounded in a drive-by shooting while sitting on a porch.
September 11	Detroit (11)	Michigan	0	4	4	Four people were wounded in the early morning in a drive-by shooting in the Southeast side of the city.
September 11	Durham (2)	North Carolina	1	3	4	One person was killed, three others were wounded on Apex Highway near Westpark Dr.
September 11	Santa Fe	New Mexico	0	5	5	Five people were wounded at a birthday party near Paseo Feliz.
September 11	Grand Rapids (4)	Michigan	0	4	4	Four people were wounded by gunfire in the early morning hours during what Grand Rapids police described as a "large disorderly gathering" near the Blue Bridge in the downtown area of the city.
September 10	Lexington (4)	Kentucky	0	4	4	Four people were wounded in a shooting on New Circle Road and Versailles Road.
September 10	Plainfield	Indiana	2	2	4	Four people were shot, two fatally, at the White House Suites motel.
September 9	Minneapolis (8)	Minnesota	1	3 (Note: Including two pregnant women)	4	Two pregnant women and two men were shot at from a passing vehicle at the 4th Street Saloon in the Hawthorne neighborhood. A 34-year-old man, died of his injuries.
September 9	Little Rock (2)	Arkansas	1	4	5	Three people in a car were shot, one fatally, near the 1000 block of South Van Buren St; and two bystanders were wounded by shrapnel.
September 9	New York City (14)	New York	0	4	4	Four people were wounded in a shooting in the NYCHA Pelham Park Houses located in the Allerton neighborhood of the Bronx.
September 9	Elk Mills	Maryland	5	0	5	Five people were found shot to death in a murder-suicide at a home on Hebron Court. Among the victims were three children.
September 9	Minneapolis (7)	Minnesota	1	3	4	Just after 1 a.m., at the Bullwinkle Saloon in the Cedar-Riverside neighborhood, a 34-year-old man was killed by gunfire, and three others injured.
September 8	Minneapolis (6)	Minnesota	0	4	4	At about 9:12 p.m., four people were shot, two of which were hospitalized with life-threatening injuries, in an incident near the Winner Gas Station on West Broadway in the Hawthorne neighborhood.
September 7	Lexington (3)	Kentucky	0	11	11	A fight broke out involving two uninvited, non-university, people led to gunfire wounding 11 students at a house party in the North Elizabeth Street neighborhood adjacent to the University of Kentucky.
September 7	Washington (8)	District of Columbia	1	3	4	Four people were shot, one fatally, in an afternoon drive-by shooting on Chesapeake St SE in the Washington Highlands neighborhood. The shooting occurred within 1,000 feet (300 m) of a school (a violation of the Gun-Free School Zones Act of 1990) while an after-school program was in session.
September 5	Kansas City (3)	Missouri	2	2	4	Four people were shot, two fatally, at a house party.
September 5	St. Louis (4)	Missouri	0	4	4	Four people were shot in a drive-by shooting in the O'Fallon neighborhood.
September 5	Phoenix (7)	Arizona	0	4	4	Two people were shot inside an apartment unit at Sunrise Vista Apartments with stray bullets entering a next door apartment to strike two bystanders, including a child.
September 5	Hartwell	Georgia	1	3	4	Four people were shot, one fatally, in the parking lot of Jack's Bar and Grill, a nightclub along Highway 29.
September 5	East Cleveland	Ohio	1	9	10	Ten people were shot, one fatally, at a Shaw High School alumni reunion afterparty outside Just Us Lounge and Deli.
September 5	Philadelphia (19)	Pennsylvania	2	4	6	Six people were shot, two fatally, by multiple shooters at an outdoor party in Franklinville.
September 4	Indiantown	Florida	1	4	5	An argument between two people at a large street gathering in Booker Park resulted in one person killed and four others wounded.
September 4	Lauderdale Lakes	Florida	0	4	4	Four people were shot including two teenagers at a youth football tournament at Boyd Anderson High School. The shooting occurred within 1000' of a school.
September 4	Saint Paul (2)	Minnesota	3	2	5	Three people were killed and two others were wounded by gunfire inside a home on Case Avenue in the Payne-Phalen neighborhood in Saint Paul.
September 4	Chicago (34)	Illinois	2	2	4	Four people were shot, two fatally, in a walk-up shooting on S Kingston Ave in South Chicago.
September 4	Charleston (2)	South Carolina	0	5	5	Five people were shot near King and Morris Streets.
September 4	Norfolk (4)	Virginia	2	5	7	Seven people were shot, two fatally, during an argument at a house party in Highland Park near Old Dominion University. Among the casualties were several Norfolk State University students caught in the crossfire.
September 3	Birmingham (4)	Alabama	2	2	4	Four people were shot, two fatally, at Elyton Village.
September 3	Palatka	Florida	2	2	4	After an argument broke out, four people were shot, two fatally, outside of Vick's Supper Club on North 18th Street. A fifth person was injured from a bludgeoning.
September 3	Yorkville	Illinois	0	4	4	Four people were shot at a party on the 8400 block of Immanuel Road after an argument.
September 3	Capitol Heights	Maryland	1	3	4	A teenager was killed, and three others wounded including one other teenager, in a targeted shooting inside a 7-Eleven on Ritchie Road.
September 3	Chico	California	0	5	5	Five people were shot at a house party.
September 3	Dover	Delaware	0	4	4	Four people were wounded after a non-student fired into a crowd near the basketball courts at Delaware State University.
September 2	New York City (13)	New York	0	4	4	Four people were wounded in a drive-by shooting at an outlaw motorcycle gang clubhouse in Greenpoint, Brooklyn.
September 2	Minneapolis (5)	Minnesota	0	4	4	Four people were shot, two critically, outside the Merwin Liquors store on West Broadway Avenue in Minneapolis. A fight inside the store preceded the shooting.
September 2	Fresno (4)	California	2	3	5	Five people were shot, two fatally, at a stash house in downtown Fresno.
August 30	Cando	North Dakota	4	0	4	Four people were found dead from gunshot wounds in a wheat field. Authorities say it was likely a murder-suicide.
August 29	Jennings	Missouri	0	4	4	Four people were shot at the 8800 block of Cozens Avenue. The shooting occurred near a school, which was put on lockdown for about twenty minutes after the shooting.
August 28	Detroit (10)	Michigan	3	1	4	Driven by severe mental illness and apocalyptic delusions, the suspect randomly shot four people and a dog on the streets of Detroit, resulting in the deaths of three individuals. The suspect was later sentenced to 28 to 50 years in prison.
August 28	Bend	Oregon	3	2	5	2022 Bend, Oregon shooting: After posting a manifesto online, a 20-year-old man shot four people, two fatally, at the Forum Shopping Center's Safeway store before committing suicide.
August 28	Phoenix (6)	Arizona	3	5	8	2022 Phoenix shooting: person armed with a semi-automatic rifle and molotov cocktails shot up a Days Inn motel in Deer Valley killing two people, and wounding five others including two police officers.
August 28	Los Angeles (7)	California	0	6	6	Six people were shot at a bar in Boyle Heights after an argument.
August 28	Denver (5)	Colorado	0	4	4	Two adults and two juveniles were shot in the Sunnyside neighborhood around midnight.
August 28	Houston (10)	Texas	4	2	6	An individual lit several residences on fire and opened fire on evacuating individuals and first responders. Four people, including the shooter were killed and two others injured.
August 28	Albany (2)	New York	0	6	6	Six people were wounded in an overnight shooting in Pine Hills.
August 28	Clinton	Wisconsin	0	4	4	Four people were shot at a yard party on a rural homestead.
August 27	Spokane (2)	Washington	1	3	4	Three people were shot and one killed at Franklin Park.
August 27	New York City (12)	New York	1	4	5	Five people were shot, one fatally, just before midnight on the Coney Island boardwalk in Brooklyn.
August 27	Lexington (2)	Kentucky	0	7	7	Seven people were shot near Wild Health Field.
August 26	Greensburg	Louisiana	1	4	5	Five people were shot, one fatally, at a convenience store in St. Helena Parish.
August 26	Racine (2)	Wisconsin	0	5	5	Five people were shot near State and Prospect streets.
August 25	Birmingham (3)	Alabama	1	6	7	Seven people were shot, one fatally, during two shootings along Finley Boulevard. Police believe the shootings were targeted incidents.
August 25	Niagara Falls	New York	1	3	4	A person was killed and three others were wounded on 400 block of Ninth Street.
August 25	Tucson	Arizona	4	0	4	A man killed a Pima County Constable and two others before turning the gun on himself during an eviction.
August 25	Henderson	Kentucky	2	2	4	Four people were shot, two fatally, at a homeless shelter.
August 25	Spokane (1)	Washington	0	4	4	Four people, including three juveniles, were wounded at Dutch Jake Park.
August 24	Milwaukee (6)	Wisconsin	1	3	4	An elderly woman was killed and three others were injured on the 2600 block of N. 22nd Street. The suspect set his house on fire.
August 24	Chicago (33)	Illinois	0	4	4	Four teenagers were wounded during a drive-by shooting outside of an ice cream shop in Northwest Chicago.
August 24	Washington (7)	District of Columbia	2	3	5	Five people were shot, two fatally, in the Truxton Circle neighborhood. The shooting violated the Federal Gun-Free School Zone Act having occurred near a pre-K 3-5 charter school which went into lockdown on its first day of classes.
August 24	Baltimore (11)	Maryland	1	6	7	Two men exited a car and shot seven people, one fatally, at an intersection of Park Heights Avenue and Shirley Avenue. The shooting occurred within 1000' of a school.
August 24	Lynn	Massachusetts	4	0	4	A woman fatally shot three of her family members before committing suicide.
August 23	Philadelphia (18)	Pennsylvania	2	2	4	Two people were killed and two others were wounded in the Haddington neighborhood in West Philadelphia. The shooting occurred within 1000' of a school.
August 22	Lovejoy	Georgia	0	4	4	Four people were wounded by a ricochet bullet inside a Walmart when a person brandishing a loaded weapon, dropped it on the floor and it discharged.
August 22	Huntsville	Alabama	0	4	4	Four people were wounded at an apartment complex on Judith Lane.
August 21	Memphis (4)	Tennessee	1	3	4	Four people were shot, one fatally, near Interstate 240.
August 21	San Francisco (2)	California	1	3	4	Four people were shot, one fatally, after a dispute in the Mission District neighborhood.
August 20	Asheville	North Carolina	0	4	4	Four people were shot downtown.
August 20	Wilmington	Delaware	0	4	4	Four people were shot in the Brandywine Village neighborhood.
August 20	Chicago (32)	Illinois	0	5	5	Five people were wounded in the Washington Park neighborhood.
August 19	Chicago (31)	Illinois	1	4	5	Five people were shot, one fatally, in a drive-by shooting in the Holman Square neighborhood.
August 19	Chicago (30)	Illinois	0	4	4	Three adults and a teenager were wounded shortly after midnight in the front yard of a Back of the Yards home.
August 18	Norfolk (3)	Virginia	3	2	5	Five people were shot, three fatally, during a drug deal at an apartment complex.
August 17	Chicago (29)	Illinois	0	4	4	Four teenagers on a porch in the Englewood neighborhood were shot at by an unknown assailant.
August 17	Philadelphia (17)	Pennsylvania	0	4	4	Four teenagers were wounded at a birthday party shortly before midnight after a relationship argument escalated.
August 16	Philadelphia (16)	Pennsylvania	0	5	5	Five people were wounded in an evening drive-by shooting outside a West Philadelphia recreational center.
August 16	Memphis (3)	Tennessee	0	6	6	Six people were shot in a drive-by shooting at a gas station, with a follow-up attack on those wounded near a hospital in the Sunset Trace neighborhood.
August 14	Chicago (28)	Illinois	1	4	5	A woman was killed and four others; including two teenagers, were wounded in Auburn Gresham shortly after midnight.
August 14	Baltimore (10)	Maryland	1	3	4	A man was killed and three others were wounded in the early morning in Northeast Baltimore.
August 14	Phoenix (5)	Arizona	1	5	6	An argument at a late night party escalated into gunfire leaving one person dead and several others injured.
August 13	Atlanta (8)	Georgia	1	4	5	An argument at an apartment complex near the airport escalated into gunfire leaving one dead, and four injured
August 13	Renton (2)	Washington	0	4	4	Four people were injured in the early morning at a local park during a large gathering.
August 13	Raleigh (2)	North Carolina	0	6	6	Six teenagers were injured at a party for teenagers at a local club after a fight escalated.
August 12	St. Louis (3)	Missouri	1	3	4	One person was killed and three people were injured at a night club in the early morning.
August 12	Philadelphia (15)	Pennsylvania	0	4	4	Four adults were injured in an evening drive-by shooting in Frankford.
August 11	Brentwood	California	1	3	4	Four people shot, one fatally, after a late night argument at a gym.
August 8	Richmond (3)	Virginia	0	4	4	Four people were injured in a night time shooting at a local convenience store.
August 8	Atlanta (7)	Georgia	2	4	6	A disagreement during a ballgame at Rosa L. Burney Park ended with six people shot, two fatally, included among the wounded was a six-year-old child.
August 7	Birmingham (2)	Alabama	1	4	5	Five people were shot, one fatally after a vehicle collision led to an argument.
August 7	Pittsburgh (2)	Pennsylvania	1	3	4	Four people were shot, one fatally in the California-Kirkbride neighborhood.
August 7	Cincinnati (2)	Ohio	0	9	9	Nine people, including one of the perpetrators were wounded in a shooting outside a bar in the Over-the-Rhine neighborhood.
August 6	Detroit (8)	Michigan	1	6	7	Seven people were shot during a dice game.
August 6	Detroit (7)	Michigan	2	3	5	Five people were shot at a drug den.
August 6	Duquesne	Pennsylvania	0	4	4	Four teenagers were shot at a housing community.
August 5	Norfolk (2)	Virginia	0	4	4	A sheriff's deputy and three others were shot outside a restaurant.
August 5	New York City (11)	New York	0	4	4	At least four people were shot at a police-involved shootout at a gang-related house party in Laurelton neighborhood of Queens. The police were involved in the melee after shots fired during the shootout between rival gang members.
August 5	Butler Township	Ohio	4	0	4	Four people were killed at multiple sites in Butler Township north of Dayton.
August 5	Milwaukee (5)	Wisconsin	0	4	4	Four people were wounded in a shooting.
August 4	Nashville (2)	Tennessee	1	3	4	A woman was killed and three others wounded at an apartment complex in Antioch.
August 4	Laurel	Nebraska	4	0	4	A man killed four people at two separate homes and set their houses on fire.
August 3	West Perrine	Florida	0	5	5	Five people were shot in a drive-by shooting
August 3	Los Angeles (6)	California	1	4	5	One person was killed and four others wounded at a shooting at an indoor swap meet in the Panorama City neighborhood.
August 2	Albany (1)	New York	0	5	5	Five men were wounded in a shooting.
August 2	Orlando (2)	Florida	5	0	5	A 45-year-old man is suspected of killing his wife and three daughters before committing suicide.
August 1	Columbus (3)	Ohio	2	3	5	Two people were killed and three others injured during a shootout with members of an outlaw motorcycle gang outside a bar.
August 1	Washington (6)	District of Columbia	1	5	6	One person was killed and five others injured in a shooting outside an apartment complex in the Kingman Park neighborhood.
August 1	Dudley	North Carolina	1	3	4	Officers serving an involuntary commitment order on a man were fired upon by him, leaving three injured. After a nine-hour standoff at his home with police, the man was found dead inside from a self-inflicted gunshot wound.
August 1	Paramount	California	1	3	4	One person was killed, and three others were injured in a shooting not far from Interstate 105.
July 31	Decatur	Illinois	1	3	4	One teenager was killed and three others injured in a shooting at the end of a graduation party at a brewpub.
July 31	Hartford (2)	Connecticut	0	4	4	Four people, including a teenager, were shot in the Clay Arsenal neighborhood.
July 31	South Bend (2)	Indiana	0	4	4	A person shot four people in two different locations, who were later transferred to hospitals. No motive has been established.
July 31	Detroit (6)	Michigan	2	6	8	Two people were killed, and six others were injured after a man fired at a home from the street.
July 31	Orlando (1)	Florida	0	7	7	Seven people were shot when someone opened fire into a crowd during a fight in the Central Business District during the early morning.
July 31	Indianapolis (5)	Indiana	0	4	4	Four people were shot after a fight in the Broad Ripple neighborhood during the early morning.
July 30	Wheeling	Illinois	0	5	5	Following an argument at a bar earlier in the morning between two groups, one of the groups opened fire at the residence the other group was at, leaving five injured.
July 30	Monroe (4)	Louisiana	1	3	4	A teenager was killed, and three other people were injured when multiple people opened fire on a group outside an apartment.
July 30	Girard	Georgia	1	4	5	Multiple people opened fire during a party at an unlicensed bar, leaving one dead and four others injured.
July 29	San Juan (2)	Puerto Rico	4	0	4	Several members of a gang shot other gang members in an apartment building, killing four people, including an uninvolved bystander.
July 29	Albuquerque (3)	New Mexico	1	4	5	A teenager was killed, and four other people were hurt during a shooting in the northwest part of the city.
July 29	Cleveland (3)	Ohio	1	3	4	One person was killed, and three others were injured in a shooting at an intersection between the Corlett and Lee-Miles neighborhoods.
July 29	Goulds	Florida	0	4	4	A shooting at an apartment complex injured four teenagers. Two of the victims were airlifted to a nearby children's hospital.
July 29	Baltimore (9)	Maryland	2	2	4	An argument in the Walbrook neighborhood led to at least one person opening fire, killing two and injuring two others. The suspects carjacked a vehicle in an attempt to escape before crashing the car into another vehicle.
July 27	Hahnville	Louisiana	1	3	4	Four people were shot in a residential neighborhood, one of whom died.
July 27	Farmers Loop	Alaska	4	0	4	A teenager killed three of his siblings and then himself, while the parents and a fifth sibling were not at home at the time of the shooting.
July 26	Macon (2)	Georgia	2	2	4	Four people were shot, including three teenagers, outside a townhome in the northwest part of the city. One teenager and one adult died.
July 25	New Orleans (7)	Louisiana	0	4	4	Four men walking along the road in the Faubourg Lafayette neighborhood were shot shortly after midnight.
July 24	Dallas (5)	Texas	1	3	4	An argument among a group of people led to a man opening fire in the city's Northwest side, killing another man, and injuring two teens before being shot by one of the victims.
July 24	Harmony Township	Ohio	3	1	4	When concerned family members checked on a man at his trailer home, they were met with gunfire, with the man fatally shooting his mother and injuring another woman. Responding police entered the trailer and were fired upon, leaving one deputy dead and another suffering a non-gunshot injury to the leg. The man killed himself, and the trailer home burned down.
July 24	Los Angeles (5)	California	2	5	7	Two people were killed and five others injured during a shooting at a car show in Peck Park in the San Pedro neighborhood.
July 24	Fort Worth (2)	Texas	1	3	4	One person was killed, and three others injured after a shooting in the Meadowbrook neighborhood.
July 24	Atlanta (6)	Georgia	0	8	8	Eight people, including at least two teenagers, were shot during a drive-by shooting at a Shell gas station in the Loring Heights neighborhood.
July 24	Bennettsville	South Carolina	1	3	4	One person was killed and three others injured during a shooting at a nightclub.
July 23	Lamar	Colorado	3	1	4	A man shot three people at an apartment complex, killing two, before fleeing by vehicle to a field near Holly, where he killed himself after a police pursuit.
July 23	Chicago (27)	Illinois	0	4	4	Shortly before midnight, a man opened fire on a group of people in the Back of the Yards neighborhood, leaving four injured.
July 23	Richmond (2)	Virginia	0	5	5	Five men were shot in the McGuire Manor neighborhood shortly before midnight.
July 23	El Paso	Texas	0	4	4	Four people were shot during a large party at a home in the east side during the early morning.
July 23	Rockford	Illinois	2	2	4	A shooting during a gathering at a closed park left two dead and two others injured.
July 23	Pinebluff	North Carolina	1	4	5	Five people were shot on a road during the early morning, one of whom died.
July 23	Renton (1)	Washington	1	6	7	Seven people were shot, one fatally, shortly after midnight behind a concert hall.
July 23	Chicago (26)	Illinois	0	4	4	A man got out of a black truck and opened fire with a rifle on a group of people in the East Garfield Park neighborhood, leaving four people injured.
July 23	Kalamazoo	Michigan	0	9	9	Nine people were shot during a party in the Northside neighborhood.
July 21	Los Angeles (4)	California	0	4	4	Two men shot four people standing outside a CVS in the Historic Core.
July 19	Lincoln	Nebraska	0	4	4	Four people, including a teenager, were shot in the Hartley neighborhood.
July 18	Atlanta (5)	Georgia	0	5	5	Multiple people opened fire during a gathering in the Thomasville Heights neighborhood in the city's southeast side, wounding five, including at least one teenager.
July 17	Las Vegas	Nevada	2	2	4	An off-duty North Las Vegas police officer fatally shot his daughter and wounded his son and wife before committing suicide.
July 17	Newark (2)	New Jersey	0	4	4	Four teenagers were shot in the Broadway neighborhood.
July 17	Denver (4)	Colorado	0	7	7	2022 Denver police shooting: Seven people were injured in downtown Denver by Denver Police who were "going after a suspect [police] claimed to have seen with a gun in a crowded area of the city's downtown." Six of the seven injured were bystanders. An independent monitor from outside the police department has been setup to investigate the shooting.
July 17	Greenwood	Indiana	4	2	6	Greenwood Park Mall shooting: A local man shot five people, three fatally, inside the food court of Greenwood Park Mall before being fatally shot by an armed civilian.
July 17	Beech Grove	Indiana	1	3	4	Four people were shot, one fatally, at a park.
July 17	Mount Vernon	Washington	0	5	5	Five people, including three teenagers, were shot after a fight escalated inside a Walmart.
July 17	Milledgeville (2)	Georgia	0	5	5	Five people were shot during a block party.
July 17	Vancouver	Washington	2	2	4	Two people were killed, and two others injured during a shooting at a crowded house party in the Harney Heights neighborhood.
July 17	Grand Rapids (3)	Michigan	0	4	4	Four people were injured in a shooting outside a bar in the Downtown area of Grand Rapids.
July 17	New York City (10)	New York	0	4	4	Four people, including a teenager, were shot in the Brownsville neighborhood of Brooklyn.
July 16	Houston (9)	Texas	4	0	4	Four people were fatally shot at an apartment complex following an argument.
July 16	Columbus (2)	Ohio	2	2	4	Two were killed, and two others were injured in a shooting inside a bar in the Hilltop neighborhood.
July 16	Washington (5)	District of Columbia	1	3	4	Four people were shot, one fatally, in the Edgewood neighborhood.
July 16	North Charleston (3)	South Carolina	0	4	4	Four people were shot in the parking lot of a nightclub during the early morning hours.
July 16	Monroe (3)	Louisiana	0	5	5	Two teenage brothers opened fire during a memorial, injuring five.
July 16	Philadelphia (14)	Pennsylvania	0	4	4	Four people, including a teenager, were shot in the Feltonville neighborhood of North Philadelphia.
July 14	Chicago (25)	Illinois	0	4	4	Four people were injured in a drive-by shooting in the West Garfield Park neighborhood.
July 14	Philadelphia (13)	Pennsylvania	0	4	4	Four teenagers were shot near a home in the Poplar neighborhood of North Philadelphia.
July 13	Philadelphia (12)	Pennsylvania	0	4	4	Four people, including a toddler, were shot in the Mill Creek neighborhood of West Philadelphia.
July 13	Indianapolis (4)	Indiana	1	3	4	Four teenagers were shot at an apartment complex in the Eagledale neighborhood in the city's west side, with one dying.
July 13	Minneapolis (4)	Minnesota	0	4	4	Four people were injured by gunfire in the Folwell neighborhood in the city's north side after an argument ended with shots being fired.
July 12	Detroit (5)	Michigan	1	5	6	Six people were shot outside a banquet.
July 12	Boston (2)	Massachusetts	0	4	4	Four people were shot in the Lower Roxbury neighborhood.
July 11	Memphis (2)	Tennessee	0	4	4	Four people were shot during a shootout at an apartment complex in the Whitehaven neighborhood.
July 11	Jackson (3)	Mississippi	0	4	4	An argument between two teenagers led to one of them opening fire, leaving four wounded, including the other teenager and a toddler.
July 11	Riverside, Santa Ana, Brea and La Habra	California	2	3	5	Two men robbed six 7-Eleven stores and a Yum-Yum Donuts at gunpoint across Southern California during the early morning hours on "7-Eleven Day". During the robberies, one of the men shot five people at four of the convenience stores, two of whom died. The man who opened fire is also accused of murdering a homeless man in the North Hills neighborhood of Los Angeles two days earlier.
July 10	Houghton Lake	Michigan	4	0	4	A man shot his wife, mother-in-law, and teenage son before fatally shooting himself at their home.
July 10	Alvin	Texas	1	3	4	One man was killed and three others wounded in a shooting during a party being held at a rental property.
July 10	Crest Hill	Illinois	1	4	5	While officers dispersed a crowd, a shooting during an informal gathering in a parking lot shortly before midnight left one dead and four others injured.
July 10	Kansas City (2)	Missouri	1	5	6	A shootout between several gunmen and three off-duty police officers working security at a bar just outside it left one dead and five others injured.
July 10	Chicago (24)	Illinois	0	4	4	Four people were shot near a bar in the Near North Side neighborhood during the early morning hours.
July 10	New York City (9)	New York	0	5	5	Five people were shot while on the Coney Island boardwalk in Brooklyn.
July 10	Downey	California	3	2	5	Three people were killed and two were wounded in a shootout at a house party.
July 9	Jackson's Gap	Alabama	0	4	4	Four people, including a teenager, were shot while celebrating the city's "Gap Day".
July 8	Detroit (4)	Michigan	0	4	4	Four men were injured in a drive-by shooting in the Midtown neighborhood.
July 8	Greensboro (1)	North Carolina	0	4	4	Four people were shot shortly after midnight on a city street.
July 7	Chicago (23)	Illinois	0	4	4	Four people were wounded in a drive-by shooting in the East Garfield Park neighborhood.
July 6	St. Cloud	Minnesota	0	4	4	An argument in an alleyway escalated into a shooting that injured four, including two teenagers.
July 6	Tampa (1)	Florida	0	4	4	Four people were shot at an intersection in the Jackson Heights neighborhood.
July 6	Chicago (22)	Illinois	0	4	4	Four people were shot after three men got out of a car and opened fire on a group of people in the Near West Side neighborhood.
July 5	Steubenville	Ohio	0	4	4	A shooting inside a nightclub left four injured.
July 5	Rochester (2)	New York	1	3	4	Several people opened fire on a crowd of people gathered at a recreation center, leaving one dead and three others injured.
July 5	Youngstown	Ohio	1	3	4	Four people were shot, one fatally, in the parking lot of an event center in the Lansingville neighborhood during a shootout.
July 5	Gary (2)	Indiana	3	7	10	Shortly after midnight three people were killed and seven injured at a large block party.
July 4	Shreveport (2)	Louisiana	1	3	4	Three vehicles engaged in a running gun battle, leaving one dead and three others injured.
July 4	Oakland (2)	California	0	5	5	Five people were hit by celebratory gunfire fired from a nearby neighborhood inside the Oakland Coliseum during a baseball game between the Toronto Blue Jays and Oakland Athletics.
July 4	Minneapolis (3)	Minnesota	0	7	7	During a night of 4 July and several informal Independence Day celebrations, a shooting at Boom Island Park left seven injured.
July 4	Denver (3)	Colorado	1	3	4	A shooting in the College View neighborhood left one dead and three others injured.
July 4	New York City (8)	New York	0	4	4	Four adults were wounded at a cookout at a home in Rochdale Village, Queens after an unidentified shooter arrived and opened fire. They fled before police arrived.
July 4	Kenosha (2)	Wisconsin	1	4	5	Five people were shot, one fatally, at a home in the central part of the city.
July 4	Boston (1)	Massachusetts	0	4	4	Four people were shot at an intersection in the Dorchester neighborhood.
July 4	Sacramento (2)	California	1	4	5	A shooting outside a nightclub killed one and injured four.
July 4	Highland Park	Illinois	7	48	55	Highland Park parade shooting: Seven people were killed and 48 others were wounded after a person opened fire from a rooftop on people attending an Independence Day parade. Eleven others were injured fleeing the scene. The shooter also admitted he had plans to drive to Madison, Wisconsin, to shoot more people. He was charged with a total of 117 counts later in the month, and was sentenced to life in prison without parole in 2025.
July 4	Kansas City (1)	Missouri	0	4	4	Officers responding to reports of car break-ins heard gunshots, then found four people shot in the downtown area.
July 4	Richmond (1)	Virginia	0	6	6	Six people were shot during the early morning outside an internet cafe in the Jackson Ward neighborhood.
July 4	Chicago (21)	Illinois	0	5	5	Shortly after midnight, five people, including a teenager, were shot in the Parkway Gardens neighborhood as they stood outside.
July 3	Manassas	Virginia	0	4	4	A fight in the parking lot of a car wash escalated into a shooting that left four injured.
July 3	Mullins	South Carolina	0	4	4	Four people were wounded in a shooting.
July 3	Surprise	Arizona	3	4	7	A shooter opened fire during a birthday party leaving three men dead and four others wounded.
July 3	Tacoma (4)	Washington	0	4	4	Four people were shot in the South End neighborhood.
July 2	Clinton (2)	North Carolina	0	6	6	A drive-by shooting left four adults and two children hospitalized.
July 2	Haltom City	Texas	3	4	7	A man shot and killed two people at a home before also shooting a neighbor who was calling the police and then opened fire on three police officers as they approached the residence, wounding all three. The shooter fled the scene and later fatally shot himself.
July 1	New York City (7)	New York	1	3	4	A shooter opened fire inside a mechanic shop that was hosting a party in the Richmond Hill neighborhood of Queens, leaving one dead and three others injured.
July 1	Chicago (20)	Illinois	2	3	5	An argument outside a nightclub escalated into a shooting that left two dead and injured three others in the Chicago Loop.
July 1	Chicago (19)	Illinois	0	4	4	A man opened fire on people on a street in the West Garfield Park neighborhood, leaving four injured.
July 1	Greenwood	Mississippi	1	7	8	A drive-by shooting left one dead and seven others injured.
June 30	Allen City	Kentucky	3	4	7	2022 shooting of Kentucky police officers: A man shot dead three police officers and a police dog and wounded four other people, including three officers.
June 30	Newark (1)	New Jersey	0	9	9	Nine people were injured in a shooting.
June 29	Jersey City (1)	New Jersey	0	4	4	Four people were injured in a shooting in the Greenville neighborhood.
June 29	Philadelphia (11)	Pennsylvania	0	4	4	Four people were shot in the East Germantown neighborhood of Northwest Philadelphia.
June 28	Ripley	Tennessee	1	3	4	One person was fatally shot and two others were injured after a teenager violently forced his way into a home and opened fire. The shooter was also wounded.
June 27	Holly Springs	Mississippi	1	3	4	One person was killed and three others were injured during a shootout on MS-178.
June 27	Charlotte	North Carolina	0	5	5	Five people, included two children, were shot in the Lincoln Heights neighborhood.
June 26	Winona	Texas	0	5	5	Five people were shot at a trail ride concert.
June 26	Paterson (2)	New Jersey	0	5	5	Five people were wounded after a shooting.
June 26	Blakely	Georgia	1	6	7	One person was killed and six others wounded after a shooting.
June 26	San Antonio (6)	Texas	1	3	4	During the early morning, a fight at a nightclub escalated into a shootout that left one dead and three injured.
June 26	Tacoma (3)	Washington	0	8	8	Eight people were shot at a party in South Tacoma.
June 26	Tacoma (2)	Washington	1	4	5	Five people were shot, one fatally.
June 26	Sutherlin	Virginia	1	7	8	An early morning shooting at a party left one dead and seven others injured.
June 25	Minneapolis (2)	Minnesota	0	4	4	After multiple fights broke out during a gathering, a shooting left four injured, including several uninvolved bystanders, during the late evening hours.
June 25	Houston (8)	Texas	2	2	4	Two men were killed and another two wounded after an argument escalated into a shooting.
June 25	New York City (6)	New York	0	4	4	Four people, including an eight-year-old boy, were wounded after a man on a dirtbike opened fire on a barbeque in the Bedford-Stuyvesant neighborhood of Brooklyn.
June 24	Hopewell	Virginia	2	2	4	Four teenagers were shot near railroad tracks, two fatally.
June 24	Philadelphia (10)	Pennsylvania	2	2	4	Two were killed and two others wounded after a shootout in the Point Breeze neighborhood.
June 24	Burleson	Texas	1	3	4	A shooting killed a woman driving nearby and wounded three others. Six were arrested in connection with the shooting.
June 23	Chicago (18)	Illinois	1	3	4	Four people were shot, one fatally, near a CTA Red Line station.
June 20	New York City (5)	New York	0	5	5	Five people were shot at a party in the St. George neighborhood of Staten Island.
June 20	New York City (4)	New York	1	8	9	One person was killed, and eight others wounded at a late night barbeque party in a park in Harlem.
June 19	Detroit (3)	Michigan	1	3	4	Four people were shot, one fatally, at an apartment complex and a park in two connected shootings in the Krainz Woods neighborhood.
June 19	Washington (4)	District of Columbia	1	3	4	A teenager was killed and three others, including a police officer, were shot during a concert celebrating Juneteenth in the Cardozo neighborhood.
June 19	Grand Rapids (2)	Michigan	0	4	4	Four people were shot in the Burton Heights neighborhood in the city's southeast side.
June 19	Walterboro (2)	South Carolina	2	2	4	Two people were killed, and two others injured during a shooting at a nightclub.
June 19	Miami (3)	Florida	0	5	5	Five people, including a teenager, were shot while in a car at an intersection between the Coral Way and Coconut Grove neighborhoods.
June 18	San Antonio (5)	Texas	2	5	7	A family having a barbeque in their front yard was fired upon in a drive-by shooting, leaving two dead and five injured.
June 18	Baltimore (8)	Maryland	0	4	4	Three people standing together in the Sandtown-Winchester neighborhood were shot. A fourth person who was driving by was also hit by gunfire.
June 18	Pensacola	Florida	0	5	5	Just after midnight five people were shot at a nightclub in Downtown Pensacola.
June 17	Chicago (17)	Illinois	0	5	5	A group of people standing in a parking lot in the Lake Meadows neighborhood were fired upon, leaving five injured.
June 16	Oakland (1)	California	1	4	5	Five people were shot, one fatally, in the Civic Center neighborhood.
June 15	Denmark	South Carolina	0	4	4	Four people, including at least one teenager, were shot.
June 14	Casselberry	Florida	4	0	4	Four people, including a child, were fatally shot in a murder-suicide at an apartment complex.
June 14	Claremont	North Carolina	1	3	4	A man shot fatally a woman and injured her two adult children over an argument about repairing a sink. After shooting them, he shot himself in the foot.
June 12	Roseville	Michigan	0	4	4	A domestic incident escalated into a shooting that injured four.
June 12	Austin (2)	Texas	1	3	4	An argument in the Los Indios neighborhood led to a shooting that killed one and injured three others.
June 12	New Orleans (6)	Louisiana	0	4	4	Four people were shot outside a bar in the Mid-City neighborhood.
June 12	Gary (1)	Indiana	2	4	6	A shooting at a nightclub left two dead and four others wounded.
June 12	Denver (2)	Colorado	2	4	6	Six people were shot, two fatally, during a party in the Virginia Village neighborhood.
June 12	Los Angeles (3)	California	3	4	7	Three people were killed and four others injured during a shooting at a rapper's birthday party concert in the Boyle Heights neighborhood. Two security guards were wounded.
June 12	Indianapolis (3)	Indiana	0	5	5	A teenager shot four people during an argument, leaving one paralyzed, before being shot herself.
June 11	South Fulton	Georgia	0	7	7	Seven people were shot during a party.
June 11	Nashville (1)	Tennessee	2	2	4	Two people were shot, two fatally, during a birthday pool party at an apartment complex.
June 11	Louisville (2)	Kentucky	0	5	5	Five teenagers were shot near the Big Four Bridge.
June 11	Chicago (16)	Illinois	1	4	5	Five people in an alleyway in the Auburn Gresham neighborhood were shot in a drive-by shooting. One victim later died of their injuries.
June 11	Detroit (2)	Michigan	0	4	4	Four people were injured in a drive-by shooting during a bachelor party being hosted at an Airbnb in the Davison-Schoolcraft neighborhood in the city's northwest side.
June 10	Decatur	Georgia	1	3	4	An argument at a restaurant led to a shooting that left one person dead and three others injured.
June 9	Smithsburg	Maryland	3	3	6	A shooter opened fire at a manufacturing facility, killing three and injuring one before fleeing the scene. Responding officers spotted the fleeing suspect, who engaged in a gun battle with state troopers, leaving the suspect and a state trooper injured.
June 8	Yuma	Arizona	0	4	4	A gunfight between two cars left four injured.
June 7	Chicago (15)	Illinois	0	4	4	Four people were shot on a sidewalk in the North Lawndale neighborhood.
June 7	Baltimore (7)	Maryland	2	2	4	Four men sitting in the side yard of a house in the Frankford neighborhood were fired upon by a shooter. Two were killed, and the other two were wounded.
June 7	Chicago (14)	Illinois	0	4	4	Four people, including a teenager, were shot near a courtyard in the Altgeld Gardens neighborhood.
June 7	Portsmouth	Virginia	4	0	4	Four people were fatally shot at a home. The fourth victim succumbed to their injuries after a few days.
June 6	Salt Lake City	Utah	1	3	4	Four people were shot, one of them fatally, at an apartment complex after a fight escalated.
June 5	Andrews	South Carolina	0	4	4	Four people were injured in a drive-by shooting shortly before midnight.
June 5	Saginaw	Michigan	3	2	5	Three people were killed and two were wounded by an early morning shooting at a house. The child of a dead pregnant woman was soon delivered by doctors.
June 5	Mesa	Arizona	2	2	4	Two people were killed and two others injured in a shooting outside a nightclub.
June 5	Chattanooga (2)	Tennessee	2	12	14	2022 Chattanooga shooting: Fourteen were shot, two of them fatally, at a nightclub during the early morning. A third person was killed by a vehicle attempting to flee.
June 5	Grand Rapids (1)	Michigan	1	3	4	One person was killed and three others injured in an early morning shooting at the Festival of the Arts.
June 4	Summerton	South Carolina	1	7	8	Eight people, including six children, were shot during a graduation party after occupants in two cars opened fire at the partygoers in the yard of the house it was being held at. An adult woman was killed.
June 4	Philadelphia (9)	Pennsylvania	3	11	14	2022 Philadelphia shooting: Fourteen people were shot, three of them fatally, by multiple shooters on South Street. One of the shooters may have been shot by a responding police officer.
June 4	Hempstead	New York	1	3	4	A man was fatally shot and three others were wounded beside an apartment building.
June 4	Enterprise	Nevada	0	4	4	A couple was arrested after the boyfriend shot three people during an argument. The boyfriend was also shot.
June 4	Macon (1)	Georgia	1	3	4	Four people were shot, one fatally, at an abandoned home.
June 4	Socorro	Texas	0	5	5	Five teenagers were wounded in a targeted shooting at an early morning graduation house party after two groups at the party began fighting.
June 4	Phoenix (4)	Arizona	1	8	9	A fight during a party being held at a strip mall escalated into gunfire, with nine people being shot.
June 3	Omaha (2)	Nebraska	1	3	4	Four people were shot, one fatally, shortly before midnight near an apartment complex.
June 3	Chester	Virginia	1	5	6	Six people were shot, one fatally, during a party. One of the shooting victims also suffered a broken arm.
June 3	Birch River	West Virginia	2	2	4	Two police officers responding to a domestic disturbance were fired upon by two men. In the ensuing gun battle, a shooter and a police officer were killed. The surviving officer and shooter were both shot.
June 2	Centerville	Texas	5	0	5	Centerville shooting: An escaped prisoner broke into the holiday home of a grandfather and his four grandchildren and fatally shot four of them, as well as fatally stabbing one of the grandchildren, before stealing their truck. The prisoner was fatally shot in a gun battle with police later the same day.
June 1	Tulsa (1)	Oklahoma	5	0	5	Warren Clinic shooting: At least four people were killed and multiple were injured after a shooting inside a building on the Saint Francis Hospital campus. The shooter fatally shot himself.
May 31	Waco	Texas	0	4	4	Four people were shot in the Carver neighborhood.
May 31	Wyoming	Michigan	4	0	4	A concerned relative checked their family at their home and found four of them dead. A man had killed his girlfriend and her two eldest children before committing suicide. Three younger children were found unharmed in the home.
May 30	Charleston (1)	South Carolina	0	10	10	Ten people were shot during a party in a vacant parking lot, including a teenager. A police officer who was arriving at the scene was shot at in his police cruiser and suffered a shrapnel injury.
May 30	Philadelphia (8)	Pennsylvania	2	2	4	A shooting at a party in the Port Richmond neighborhood left two dead, including a teenager, and two others wounded.
May 30	Benton Harbor	Michigan	1	6	7	Seven people were shot, one of them fatally, outside a bar and a liquor store during the early morning.
May 29	Houston (7)	Texas	0	4	4	Four people were shot in the Willow Springs neighborhood. A victim driving away from the scene fatally struck a motorcyclist.
May 29	Chicago (13)	Illinois	1	4	5	A man shot four people, one fatally, at a home in the Humboldt Park neighborhood before barricading himself inside during a domestic-related incident. The shooter was eventually shot by a SWAT team.
May 29	Taft	Oklahoma	1	7	8	One person was killed and seven others wounded after a shooting at a Memorial Day festival at the Old City Square.
May 29	Henderson	Nevada	0	7	7	Seven people were shot during a shoot-out between biker gangs on U.S. Route 95, causing the highway to be shut down in both directions for several hours.
May 29	Phoenix (3)	Arizona	0	6	6	Six people were shot during a house party.
May 29	Fergus	California	1	3	4	Four people were shot, one fatally, at a house party during the early morning in Merced County.
May 29	Chicago (12)	Illinois	0	5	5	Five people, including a teenager, were shot in the West Garfield Park neighborhood in the early morning.
May 28	Memphis (1)	Tennessee	0	4	4	Four people were shot during an illegal car show between the Hollywood and Hyde Park neighborhoods.
May 28	Malabar	Florida	0	4	4	A disturbance between two teenagers at a house party escalated into a shooting that wounded four after one of the teenagers opened fire shortly before midnight.
May 28	Fresno (3)	California	1	3	4	One teenager was killed and three were wounded in a shooting in the McLane neighborhood.
May 28	Chattanooga (1)	Tennessee	0	6	6	Six people were injured during an exchange of gunfire in the Riverfront neighborhood.
May 28	Colorado Springs (4)	Colorado	1	3	4	Four people were shot, one fatally, in a shooting in a bar parking lot during the early morning hours.
May 27	Austin Township	Michigan	4	1	5	A man fatally shot his wife and his step-children before non-fatally shooting himself in the head.
May 27	Anniston	Alabama	0	6	6	Six people, including several teenagers, were shot at a graduation party.
May 25	Philadelphia (7)	Pennsylvania	0	4	4	Four people were shot, including two teenagers, while on the way to a prom party in the Mantua neighborhood.
May 24	Uvalde	Texas	22	18	40	Robb Elementary School shooting: An 18-year-old shot his grandmother at their home before driving to Robb Elementary School, where he entered the school unobstructed, barricading himself inside a classroom and fatally shooting twenty-one people, including nineteen children. Eighteen people in total were wounded. The shooter was eventually fatally shot by a Border Patrol officer, who was shot during the shootout.
May 23	Cleveland (2)	Ohio	0	5	5	Five people were shot during a memorial service in the Collinwood neighborhood.
May 23	North Charleston (2)	South Carolina	0	5	5	Five people were injured in an early morning shooting at a nightclub. Several others were injured by broken glass during the chaos of the shooting.
May 22	San Juan (1)	Puerto Rico	5	0	5	Police discovered five people shot to death at a public housing complex in the Caimito barrio.
May 22	Riverside	Alabama	4	0	4	A man fatally shot his two teenage daughters and his wife before shooting himself.
May 21	Tacoma (1)	Washington	0	4	4	A drive-by shooting in the South End area left four wounded.
May 21	Goshen	Indiana	2	3	5	A shooting occurred at a home, leaving two people dead and three injured.
May 20	San Bernardino (2)	California	1	9	10	A shooting occurred at an after-prom party, leaving one dead and nine injured.
May 20	New Orleans (5)	Louisiana	1	3	4	Four people were shot, one fatally, in the Holy Cross neighborhood.
May 20	Kissimmee	Florida	1	3	4	A drive-by shooting in front of a grocery store wounded three and killed one.
May 19	Chicago (11)	Illinois	2	8	10	Magnificent Mile shooting: An individual opened fire during an altercation between two groups of teenagers, killing two and injuring eight. The shooter engaged in a chase with police in the subway, during which a woman fell onto the train tracks and was electrocuted during the chaos.
May 19	Houston (6)	Texas	4	0	4	An estranged husband opened fire on his wife, killing her, their daughter, and his mother-in-law before committing suicide.
May 18	Philadelphia (6)	Pennsylvania	0	5	5	Five people were shot in the Cecil B. Moore neighborhood, including a teenager.
May 17	East Palo Alto	California	1	3	4	Four people were shot, one of them fatally, at a park in a targeted attack.
May 15	Winston-Salem	North Carolina	0	7	7	Seven people were shot in three connected shootings that preceded an exchange of gunfire.
May 15	Elizabeth City	North Carolina	0	4	4	Two teenagers and two juveniles were shot at a house in the Shepard Street–South Road Street Historic District.
May 15	Laguna Woods	California	1	5	6	2022 Laguna Woods shooting: A man motivated by anti-Taiwanese sentiment opened fire at a church, killing one and wounding five others, before being physically restrained by churchgoers.
May 15	Houston (5)	Texas	2	3	5	Two people were killed, and three others were injured, at a flea market after an argument escalated into a shooting in the Meadowviewland neighborhood.
May 15	Amarillo	Texas	1	4	5	Five people were shot at a nightclub in the morning, with one person dying.
May 14	Buffalo (3)	New York	10	3	13	2022 Buffalo shooting: An 18-year-old white supremacist clad in body armor opened fire at a Tops supermarket, killing ten, including a security guard, and wounding three others.
May 13	Milwaukee (4)	Wisconsin	0	17	17	A gunfight among several groups of people wounded seventeen people following an NBA game in the East Town neighborhood.
May 13	Dallas (4)	Texas	2	3	5	Two people were killed, and three were injured, in a shooting in the Deep Ellum neighborhood.
May 12	Canóvanas	Puerto Rico	0	4	4	Three adults and a 6-year-old girl were wounded in a shooting.
May 12	Hot Springs	Arkansas	0	4	4	A fight outside a convention center following a high school graduation ceremony led to a shooting that injured four. No students or graduates were involved in the shooting or the fight.
May 11	Paterson (1)	New Jersey	1	4	5	A teenage girl was killed, and four men wounded, in a shooting in the Sandy Hill neighborhood.
May 11	Chicago (10)	Illinois	0	4	4	Four people, including two children, were shot while they drove together in a vehicle in the West Englewood neighborhood.
May 11	St. Louis (2)	Missouri	1	3	4	Four people, including a teenager and a baby, were injured in an ambush while they drove in a car in the Mark Twain neighborhood. One of the adult victims later succumbed to his injuries.
May 11	Indianapolis (2)	Indiana	0	4	4	Four people, including two teenagers, were shot along the Canal Walk after two groups of people began shooting at each other across the water following an argument.
May 10	Brookshire	Texas	1	3	4	A shooter shot four people, one fatally, before fleeing and sparking a manhunt.
May 10	Chicago (9)	Illinois	0	6	6	Six people were shot by two men in a drive-by shooting in the Jackson Park neighborhood on the South Side.
May 10	Baltimore (6)	Maryland	0	5	5	Five people were shot during a confrontation between two groups after at least one of the groups opened fire in northwestern Baltimore.
May 10	Chicago (8)	Illinois	1	4	5	Five teenagers outside in the Back of the Yards neighborhood on the South Side were shot, one fatally, by multiple occupants of a stolen vehicle.
May 10	Baltimore (5)	Maryland	1	3	4	Four people were shot, one fatally, in the Milton-Montford neighborhood.
May 10	Philadelphia (5)	Pennsylvania	0	4	4	Four people were shot, including two teenagers, in the Kensington neighborhood.
May 9	Tuscaloosa (2)	Alabama	0	5	5	An argument in the common area of an apartment complex led to a shooting that injured five.
May 9	Detroit (1)	Michigan	0	4	4	A fight amongst a group of people in the Chandler Park neighborhood on the city's east side led to four people, including three teenagers, being shot.
May 8	Clarkston	Georgia	3	3	6	Three people were killed, and another three were injured, in a shooting at a condominium complex. The suspected shooter has since been found.
May 7	Garland	Texas	2	2	4	A shooting outside a house party left two teenagers dead, and two others injured, shortly before midnight.
May 7	Brownsville	Florida	0	4	4	A fight during an informal car meet among a group of people led to a shooting that injured four, including two juveniles.
May 7	Lexington (1)	Kentucky	2	3	5	A shooting during the very early morning killed two, and wounded three.
May 6	New Orleans (4)	Louisiana	2	4	6	A shooting in the Village de L'Est neighborhood left two killed, and four others wounded.
May 5	Sunnyside	Washington	0	5	5	During a Cinco de Mayo festival, a gang member shot at a member of a rival gang who was in a crowd of people, wounding five bystanders—including four children. The shooting prompted the cancellation of the event. A 13-year-old boy has now been arrested as the suspected shooter.
May 3	Newkirk	Oklahoma	0	4	4	A shooting at a casino in Kaw Nation territory wounded four.
May 3	Beaumont (1)	Texas	0	5	5	An unknown shooter opened fire through an apartment window, and wounded five people.
May 3	Baton Rouge (3)	Louisiana	0	5	5	Five people were injured in a shooting incident during the evening.
May 3	Chicago (7)	Illinois	0	4	4	Three people were shot in the Chicago Loop as they sat at a red light at an intersection by two people. Another person was shot by a stray bullet as they crossed the street.
May 1	Tarpon Springs	Florida	0	6	6	An argument among a group of people led to someone opening fire, wounding six.
May 1	Springfield	Ohio	1	4	5	Five people were shot, one fatally, on a street in the early morning.
May 1	Lafayette (1)	Louisiana	0	12	12	Officers responding to shots fired engaged an active shooter and shot the attacker. Eleven people were shot before police stopped the shooter.
May 1	Clinton (1)	North Carolina	1	3	4	A party being held at a park ended in gunfire, with four people being shot. One person succumbed to their injuries.
April 30	Jackson (2)	Mississippi	1	5	6	A shooting by multiple people at a festival wounded five. One of the shooters was fatally shot by a responding officer.
April 30	Atlanta (4)	Georgia	1	4	5	A fight in the Rosedale Heights neighborhood led to a shooting that killed one, and injured four others.
April 29	Jackson	Tennessee	2	2	4	Four teenagers were shot, two fatally, in a drive by shooting.
April 29	Knoxville (3)	Tennessee	2	2	4	Two people were killed, and three others were injured, after a fight between two biker gangs led to a gunfight in a bar parking lot in the Fountain City neighborhood.
April 29	New Orleans (3)	Louisiana	0	6	6	A shootout at a bar between two groups of people wounded six people in the 11th Ward neighborhood.
April 29	Laurel	Mississippi	0	4	4	A shooting at a party injured four.
April 28	Bessemer	Alabama	1	3	4	A woman was killed, and three other people were injured, including a teenager, in a revenge shooting.
April 27	Opelousas	Louisiana	2	3	5	An argument between two men escalated into a shooting that killed a young girl, and another man. Three children, including a toddler, were also shot.
April 27	Chicago (6)	Illinois	0	4	4	Four people, including a teenager, were wounded in a drive-by shooting in the West Garfield Park neighborhood.
April 27	Biloxi and Gulfport	Mississippi	4	0	4	A man fatally shot three people, including the owner, at a motel in Biloxi before fleeing westward to Gulfport. In Gulfport, he fatally shot another man and carjacked his vehicle, before barricading himself inside a convenience store. The shooter assaulted two employees of the convenience store, but they escaped unharmed, after which he barricaded himself inside an office. The shooter set a fire in the room which caused him to die of smoke inhalation.
April 27	Phoenix (2)	Arizona	0	4	4	Four people were shot during an argument in the Maryvale Village neighborhood.
April 27	San Antonio (4)	Texas	0	4	4	During the filming of a music video at a barber shop, at least one person opened fire from a passing vehicle, wounding four. A fifth person was injured while trying to flee.
April 26	Rock Hill	South Carolina	3	1	4	Three teenagers were fatally shot on a road in northwest Rock Hill. Another person was shot but survived.
April 25	Birmingham (1)	Alabama	1	3	4	A shooting at a gathering at a Shell gas station wounded three people, and killed one.
April 24	Lafayette	Indiana	2	4	6	A fight at a house party led to six people being shot, with two dying from their injuries.
April 24	Myrtle Beach	South Carolina	1	3	4	Four people were shot, one fatally, during the early morning hours.
April 23	San Bernardino (1)	California	1	4	5	Five people were shot, one fatally, in a shooting at a bar in the Muscupiabe neighborhood.
April 23	Atlanta (3)	Georgia	0	5	5	Five people were shot in the Hotel District neighborhood during the late night hours.
April 23	Chicago (5)	Illinois	2	2	4	Four people were shot, two fatally, in a drive-by shooting in the West Englewood neighborhood.
April 23	Rocky Mount	North Carolina	0	4	4	A fight at a sports bar led to a shooting that injured four during the early morning hours in the Goldest East neighborhood.
April 22	Petersburg	Virginia	0	4	4	Four people were injured in a shooting during the night in central Petersburg.
April 22	Washington (3)	District of Columbia	1	4	5	A 23-year-old man named Raymond Spencer shot at random people at Edmund Burke School from his apartment with a sniper-style set-up, wounding four—including a child, in the Forest Hills neighborhood. The man committed suicide as officers entered his apartment.
April 22	Cincinnati (1)	Ohio	0	4	4	Four people were injured in the Walnut Hills neighborhood.
April 21	Mountain View	Arkansas	4	0	4	A man shot to death his parents and another couple a quarter-mile apart from each other inside their homes. The shooter was sentenced to 60 years in 2024.
April 20	Duluth	Minnesota	5	0	5	A man shot four of his family members, including two children, as they slept before shooting himself.
April 18	Cooleemee	North Carolina	4	0	4	A man shot his girlfriend and their two young children before shooting himself.
April 17	Golden Glades	Florida	1	3	4	A fight at an Easter party being held at a home ended in gunshots, with a man being killed and three others, including two juveniles, being injured.
April 17	Baldwin	Louisiana	0	5	5	Five people were shot during the late evening hours.
April 17	Portland (4)	Oregon	1	3	4	One teenage boy died, and three others are in a hospital, after a shooting in the Centennial neighborhood.
April 17	Philadelphia (4)	Pennsylvania	0	4	4	Four people were shot in the Fairhill neighborhood.
April 17	Furman	South Carolina	0	9	9	A shooting at an Easter party being hosted at a nightclub wounded nine.
April 17	Parkway	California	1	3	4	A neighborhood wounded three, and killed one, during the early morning hours.
April 17	Pittsburgh (1)	Pennsylvania	2	9	11	2022 Pittsburgh shooting: An early morning shooting at a party held at an Airbnb rental property in the East Allegheny neighborhood killed two juveniles, and wounded nine others. Five people sustained injuries such as broken bones and cuts when they jumped out windows to escape the gunfire.
April 16	North Las Vegas	Nevada	0	4	4	Four people were shot, including two children, during a house party.
April 16	Paw Paw	Michigan	0	4	4	An exchange of gunfire behind a bar left four wounded.
April 16	Pittsburg	Texas	1	6	7	Seven people were shot, one fatally, during a shooting at a pasture party and trail ride.
April 16	Baltimore (4)	Maryland	1	3	4	A shooting killed one, and injured three others, in northwest Baltimore during the evening.
April 16	Columbia (2)	South Carolina	0	9	9	Columbiana Centre shooting: Nine people were shot, and five others were injured while fleeing a shooting at the Columbiana Centre, after at least one person opened fire.
April 16	Milledgeville (1)	Georgia	0	4	4	An argument between two men at a bar escalated, with them opening fire on each other and wounding one another. Two bystanders were also shot.
April 16	Syracuse	New York	1	4	5	Shortly after midnight, five people were shot, one fatally, in the Armory Square neighborhood.
April 15	Stockton (2)	California	2	2	4	A group of people approached another group and opened fire, killing two and wounding two others in the Pacific neighborhood.
April 15	Walnut Township	Kansas	1	3	4	Police officers responding to reports of a suspicious vehicle found a woman inside a Jeep, who refused to cooperate with officers. She then pulled out a gun when officers attempted to remove her from the vehicle and opened fire, wounding three officers before being fatally shot.
April 12	New York City (3)	New York	3	1	4	Four people were shot, three fatally, in the Allerton neighborhood of The Bronx.
April 12	New York City (2)	New York	0	10	10	2022 New York City Subway attack: Ten people were shot when a gunman motivated by black supremacy opened fire on a New York City Subway train as it approached the 36th Street station in the Sunset Park neighborhood. Immediately before the attack, the assailant donned a gas mask and threw smoke bombs. The incident caused 19 others to be injured as they fled. The suspect was arrested the next day.
April 10	Willowbrook	California	2	4	6	First responders found two men dead, and four others injured, after a shooting.
April 10	Cedar Rapids	Iowa	2	10	12	A targeted shooting at a nightclub wounded ten, and killed two, after two men opened fire in the Oakhill Jackson neighborhood.
April 10	Baton Rouge (2)	Louisiana	0	4	4	Police found three people shot at two related shootings, after a victim flagged down a police cruiser.
April 10	Indianapolis (1)	Indiana	1	5	6	A fight at a birthday party being held at an event venue erupted into gunfire, with five people being injured, and another person being killed, both in and outside the building.
April 10	Elgin	Illinois	1	5	6	An early morning shooting at a gathering being held at an apartment complex killed one, and injured five.
April 9	Washington (2)	District of Columbia	0	4	4	A shooting carried out by two men across multiple blocks wounded four, including two teenagers.
April 9	Houston (4)	Texas	1	3	4	A fight inside a bar in the Wingate neighborhood spilled outside, where multiple men pulled out firearms and opened fire at each other, resulting in the death of one man, and injuries to three others.
April 9	Miami (2)	Florida	0	4	4	Four people were shot outside a convenience store in the Model City neighborhood during the early morning.
April 7	Latimer	Mississippi	4	0	4	A man fatally shot his estranged wife, a relative, and another person in a home before shooting himself.
April 6	Philadelphia (3)	Pennsylvania	1	3	4	A man shot two women in the Frankford neighborhood before being pursued by police to an apartment building, where he barricaded himself inside and engaged in a gunfight with police. The man wounded a SEPTA police officer before fatally shooting himself.
April 4	Hartford (1)	Connecticut	1	3	4	Four people were shot, one of them fatally, in the Clay Arsenal neighborhood.
April 4	Covington	Kentucky	0	4	4	A large fight involving multiple juveniles erupted into gunfire. A shooter wounded three juveniles, and an adult man.
April 3	San Francisco (1)	California	2	2	4	Four people were shot, two fatally, near a playground in the Crocker-Amazon neighborhood.
April 3	Sacramento (1)	California	6	12	18	2022 Sacramento shooting: A shootout between the Crips and Bloods, and the Bloods' local ally the G-Mobb gang, ended with one member of each gang being killed, and one Crips member being injured. Three bystanders were killed, while another eleven were wounded.
April 3	Parkin and Wynne	Arkansas	2	2	4	A man opened fire inside a home in Parkin, killing one and wounding another. Responding police spotted him as he drove west away from the scene, leading to a chase that ended in Wynne, where he engaged in a gunfight, wounding a police officer before being fatally shot.
April 3	Buffalo (2)	New York	0	4	4	Four people were shot as they left a party in the Willert Park neighborhood in the early morning.
April 3	Dallas (3)	Texas	1	15	16	During a concert just after midnight, a person fired a shot into the air, and immediately afterward, another person opened fire into the crowd of concertgoers. Sixteen people were shot, including three teenagers, and one person died.
April 2	Colorado Springs (3)	Colorado	0	5	5	Five people were shot in two related shootings in the same neighborhood. Four people were shot in the first shooting, and a fifth was shot in the other.
April 2	Monroe (2)	Louisiana	1	4	5	Five people were shot, one fatally, in the parking lot of a bar in the early morning.
April 2	Shreveport (1)	Louisiana	1	3	4	Four people were shot in an early morning shooting outside a bar. One person was found dead by responding police.
April 2	Shelby	North Carolina	1	3	4	Four people were shot behind a bar, one fatally, just after midnight.
April 1	Walterboro (1)	South Carolina	0	5	5	An argument led to a gunfight that injured five near midnight.
March 31	Lebanon	Pennsylvania	2	2	4	Police officers responding to a home robbery were fired upon by the suspect, who wounded two, and killed one. Officers returned fire and killed the suspect.
March 29	Buffalo (1)	New York	0	4	4	A motorist fleeing a traffic stop opened fire as he was being pursued by police, wounding three officers, before being shot by an officer at the end of a car chase.
March 28	Portland (3)	Oregon	0	4	4	A shooting during an illegal street-racing event in the St. Johns neighborhood wounded four, including two teenagers, and one child. The suspect, an adult male, was also injured.
March 27	New Orleans (2)	Louisiana	2	2	4	A shooting at an intersection in the Little Woods neighborhood killed two, and injured two others.
March 26	Hollister	California	2	3	5	A drive-by shooting in northern Hollister killed two, and injured three.
March 26	Cleveland (1)	Ohio	0	4	4	A shooting at a downtown nightclub during the early morning hours wounded four.
March 26	Virginia Beach	Virginia	0	4	4	An argument between two groups of people outside a bar in Northwest Virginia Beach just after midnight led to a shooting that injured four. Officers nearby responded and fired at one of the shooters, but they escaped uninjured.
March 25	Colorado Springs (2)	Colorado	2	2	4	A fight outside The Citadel mall during the late evening escalated into a shooting that killed two, and wounded two others.
March 23	Glendale (2)	Arizona	0	5	5	An argument between two groups of people at a Tanger Outlets mall led to a shooting that injured five, including a child and two teenagers.
March 23	Williamson	New York	0	4	4	An attempted burglary at a home led to a gunfight, with two residents being injured, and two robbers being injured.
March 22	Stockton (1)	California	1	3	4	Four men, including a teenager, were shot in a parking lot just after midnight in the Valley Oak neighborhood. The teenager died as he was frantically driven to a hospital by a family member.
March 21	Chicago (4)	Illinois	2	2	4	Four men were shot by someone who approached them and opened fire as they stood on the sidewalk in the South Shore neighborhood. Two of the victims later died from their injuries.
March 21	Waterbury	Connecticut	0	4	4	Four people were shot outside of a bar after an altercation.
March 20	Dallas (2)	Texas	0	10	10	Crossfire between two gunmen injured 10 victims from a crowd of 1,000 spring break celebration attendees at the 'Space Dallas' party hall.
March 20	Milwaukee (3)	Wisconsin	0	4	4	An argument at a party led to someone opening fire, wounding four people, in the Franklin Heights neighborhood.
March 20	Houston (3)	Texas	1	3	4	Four teenagers were shot outside another teen's birthday party being held at a production studio, with one dying from their injuries. The shooting was sparked by an argument in the parking lot of the studio.
March 20	Austin (1)	Texas	0	4	4	Four people were shot at the annual SXSW festival in Downtown Austin.
March 19	Fayetteville	North Carolina	3	2	5	Five people were shot, three fatally, in the parking lot of a Baymont Inn in the Terry Sanford neighborhood.
March 19	Dallas (1)	Texas	0	10	10	Ten people were shot during a drive-by shooting outside a party venue in the South Dallas neighborhood.
March 19	Dumas	Arkansas	1	26	27	A gunfight between two people at a car show killed one bystander, and wounded 26 others, including five children.
March 19	Madison Heights	Virginia	1	4	5	During the early morning hours, five people were shot. A woman was found dead by responding police.
March 19	Norfolk (1)	Virginia	2	3	5	Five people were shot, one fatally, during the early morning hours in Downtown Norfolk.
March 18	New Iberia	Louisiana	0	5	5	Five people, including a baby, were shot in a drive by shooting. The baby and another person were critically injured.
March 18	Fort Worth (1)	Texas	1	3	4	Four people were shot at a party being hosted at a house in the Far Greater Northside Historical neighborhood, with one dying.
March 17	Lansing	Michigan	0	4	4	Gunfire erupted at a party being held in a parking lot being held in the Eastside neighborhood. Four people were injured.
March 17	Fort Lauderdale	Florida	2	5 (Note: 2 by gunfire, 3 by associated traffic accidents)	7	As a Broward County Transit bus traveled westward along Broward Boulevard to the Fort Lauderdale Police Department, a shooter opened fire inside, killing two, and wounding two others. The shooting caused the bus driver to hop the median and drive on the wrong side of the road as she drove frantically towards the police station, striking an SUV and taxi cab along the way, injuring three others. The shooter surrendered to responding police.
March 17	Chicago (3)	Illinois	0	4	4	Four people were shot in a drive-by shooting in the West Garfield Park neighborhood, including a child.
March 16	Irvington	New Jersey	1	3	4	A shooter opened fire on a group of men standing outside a market in northern Irvington during the late-night hours, killing one, and injuring three.
March 15	Ozark	Alabama	0	5	5	As a car idled at an intersection, another car pulled up to it and someone inside opened fire, wounding five people inside.
March 15	Wai'anae	Hawaii	1	3	4	An attempted negotiation between a man and suspected thieves, who he thought stole a gun and cash from his car three days earlier, escalated into a gun battle after one of the suspects shot the man before the man returned fire and killed the suspect. As an employee of the man tried to render first-aid to the first suspect, a second suspect shot them before being shot themselves.
March 14	Albuquerque (2)	New Mexico	2	4	6	A man shot three people, killing one, in the Glenwood Hills neighborhood. Responding police were attacked by the shooter, who injured two officers, before being shot and killed himself.
March 14	Reading	Pennsylvania	1	3	4	A fight among a large group of teenagers at a park in southwest Reading led to gunfire, wounding three, and killing one. All of the victims were students of Governor Mifflin School District.
March 13	Chicago (2)	Illinois	0	7	7	A car pulled up to a group of people outside a Little Caesars in South Chicago and someone in the vehicle opened fire, wounding seven people.
March 13	Columbia (1)	South Carolina	1	4	5	An early morning shooting during a party being held at an apartment lead to the death of a woman, and injuries to four others, including two teenagers. The apartment complex is located just off the campus of the University of South Carolina, but no students were shot.
March 13	Rochester (1)	New York	2	2	4	In the early morning hours at a hookah bar, four people were shot—two fatally, in the Brown Square neighborhood.
March 12	Autaugaville	Alabama	1	3	4	Four people were shot, one fatally, in the evening hours in the central part of the city.
March 12	Baltimore (3)	Maryland	3	1	4	Police responding to a shots fired call found a car in the middle of an intersection between the Gwynn Oak and Howard Park neighborhoods with four men shot inside. Three of the men were pronounced dead at a hospital.
March 11	Columbus (1)	Ohio	1	3	4	Four people were shot, including a security guard, shortly after midnight after a fight broke out at a bar. One of the victims died from their injuries.
March 9	Aurora (1)	Colorado	1	3	4	Four people were shot at a Quality Inn hotel near the pool in the Peterson neighborhood. A teen boy was found dead by responding police.
March 8	Jacksonville (1)	Florida	1	4	5	Five teenagers were shot by an attacker while they sat in a car in the Oceanway neighborhood. One of the teenagers died from their injuries.
March 8	Joplin	Missouri	3	1	4	Police officers responding to a disturbance at Northpark Mall were fired upon by a shooter, leaving two officers injured. The perpetrator then fled the scene westward where another shooting between officers and the shooter occurred, leaving another officer injured as well as the attacker. One of the officers, as well as the attacker, died at a hospital later the same day, while another officer died a few days later.
March 7	Knoxville (2)	Tennessee	0	4	4	Three people were shot in a car in northwest Knoxville, with a fourth person also being shot a short distance away.
March 6	Louisville (1)	Kentucky	0	4	4	Four people who were dining inside a seafood restaurant in the Phoenix Hill neighborhood were shot in a drive-by shooting.
March 6	Lubbock	Texas	0	4	4	Four people were shot in the Parkway and Cherry Point neighborhood in the early morning hours.
March 6	Minneapolis (1)	Minnesota	1	3	4	In the early morning hours, an argument at a home in the Whittier neighborhood escalated into a shooting that killed one, and injured three.
March 6	Hazleton	Pennsylvania	1	4	5	A fight between a group of people spiraled into a shooting that injured five teenagers, one of whom died at a hospital.
March 6	Monroe (1)	Louisiana	0	4	4	A fight at a party being hosted at an OYO Rooms hotel led to four people being shot shortly after midnight.
March 6	Chester	South Carolina	2	3	5	Half an hour after midnight a man shot five people, killing two. The perpetrator escaped the scene of the shooting, leading to a manhunt.
March 5	Glendale (1)	Arizona	1	3	4	A shooting injured three, including a teenager, and killed a man in eastern Glendale.
March 5	Columbus	Georgia	0	4	4	After a failed car chase to capture car thieves, the criminals crashed the car into the patrol car of another officer who hadn't participated in the earlier car chase. The occupants of the stolen car exited the vehicle and opened fire on the deputy, wounding him. The officer returned fire and wounded the two attackers. A bystander who was in an automotive shop nearby was struck in the leg by gunfire.
March 5	Atlanta (2)	Georgia	0	4	4	Four people were shot when someone in a car opened fire on another car on I-75, wounding three people inside. Another car, whose occupants were not the intended target, was also shot, and one person inside was injured. A fifth victim was also struck by gunfire but was not injured.
March 3	Paradise	Nevada	1	6	7	A dispute between neighbors led to a shooting that injured seven, one fatally, near the Las Vegas Strip.
March 2	Baltimore (2)	Maryland	1	3	4	Four men were shot in the Walbrook neighborhood. One of the victims was found dead in an alleyway by responding police.
February 28	Arden-Arcade	California	5	0	5	A man fatally shot his three children and the children's chaperone, before shooting himself, at a church during a supervised visit. A restraining order against the father prevented him from seeing his children, except for four-hour sessions, in which a friend of the mother had to be present.
February 27	Concord	California	0	4	4	An argument between two groups of people at a Dave and Buster's late Sunday night led to shooting that injured four. All of the victims were members of the two groups.
February 27	Alexandria	Louisiana	0	4	4	An argument at a business in the southeast part of the city led to four people being shot.
February 26	North Charleston (1)	South Carolina	1	3	4	Four people were shot in the southern part of the city, and one victim died at a hospital later the same day.
February 26	Bogalusa	Louisiana	0	10	10	After the conclusion of a parade, a man fired at people in front of a store from his car, wounding several. Multiple people in the crowd fired back, seriously wounding the attacker.
February 26	Albuquerque (1)	New Mexico	1	3	4	An exchange of gunfire between people in southwest Albuquerque led to four people being shot, and one victim dying from their injuries.
February 26	Winchester	Nevada	1	13	14	An argument between two men at a hookah bar east of the Las Vegas strip led to the two men opening fire on each other. The subsequent shooting resulted in the death of one, and injuries to thirteen others.
February 25	Baton Rouge (1)	Louisiana	2	2	4	A shooter inside a car opened fire on the occupants of another car near the entrance of the Mall of Louisiana, killing two of the people inside, and wounding the other two.
February 24	Granbury	Texas	4	0	4	Four people were shot and killed in a murder–suicide, including two children in northeastern Granbury.
February 24	San Antonio (3)	Texas	0	4	4	A shooter opened fire on three people inside a car in the Serna Station neighborhood. A fourth person who was not targeted by the shooter was also struck by gunfire.
February 23	Claxton	Georgia	0	4	4	A man shot another man at a home in northern Claxton. When two family members of the victim arrived on the scene to check on him, the shooter shot them in their car, and was promptly shot by responding police.
February 22	Evans	Georgia	1	3	4	A man ambushed another man, some of his family members, and a neighbor who was a police officer in the victim's backyard due to a feud with his target. The deputy, who was not shot, returned fire and killed the shooter.
February 21	Saint Paul (1)	Minnesota	1	3	4	Multiple shooters opened fire outside a funeral home hosting a memorial for a gun violence victim in the West Side neighborhood, resulting in the death of a man, and injuries to three others.
February 20	Omaha (1)	Nebraska	0	4	4	A shooting at a grocery store in the Prospect Hill neighborhood left four injured, including a teenager.
February 20	Portland (2)	Oregon	1	3	4	Four people were shot in a car in southeast Portland, with the female driver being killed. Among the injured were two young children.
February 20	McComb	Mississippi	1	4	5	A child was killed in a drive-by shooting targeting a group of people playing basketball at a park. Four others were injured.
February 19	Portland (1)	Oregon	1	5	6	Normandale Park shooting: Near a racial justice protest, a man assaulted a group of traffic safety volunteers, shouting misogynistic slurs before pulling out a gun and opening fire, killing one and wounding four others. A bystander returned fire and wounded the assailant, ending the shooting.
February 19	Tuscaloosa (1)	Alabama	0	4	4	A shooter opened fire in the food court of University Mall, shooting and injuring a woman. Three others were injured by shrapnel or bullet fragments.
February 19	Charleston	Missouri	2	14	16	An argument at a party being held at an abandoned building led to a shooting that injured fourteen, and killed two.
February 19	Turlock	California	0	7	7	A man shot seven people outside a bar in the early morning hours in a targeted shooting perpetrated against one of the victims.
February 19	Durham (1)	North Carolina	2	2	4	Four men were shot at a Campus Apartments complex near North Carolina Central University and Duke University. Two were found dead by responding police, and none of the victims were students of either school.
February 17	Philadelphia (2)	Pennsylvania	0	4	4	Four bystanders, including a teen girl, were shot when two men shot at each other outside a RiteAid drugstore in the East Germantown neighborhood.
February 17	Houston (2)	Texas	0	5	5	During a biker event at a nightclub in the MacGregor neighborhood, an argument led to a shootout between patrons, which injured five people. Among the wounded was the club's bouncer.
February 16	West Little River	Florida	1	3	4	Three men were wounded, and one was killed, in an ambush-style shooting in the afternoon. Two sedans pulled up alongside them on the street and opened fire.
February 15	Joliet	Illinois	1	3	4	Four men were shot in northeast Joliet in the evening. One of the men was found dead by responding police.
February 13	Racine (1)	Wisconsin	1	5	6	Officers responding to an early morning shots fired call engaged in a foot chase with an armed man who had shot five people. After an attempted negotiation, he committed suicide.
February 12	Los Angeles (2)	California	0	4	4	Outside an Italian restaurant hosting a party by Justin Bieber, a fight between a group of men escalated when a shooter opened fire, wounding four, including musician Kodak Black.
February 12	Little Rock (1)	Arkansas	1	3	4	In the early morning hours, four people were shot in eastern Little Rock, with one person succumbing to their injuries.
February 12	Murfreesboro	Tennessee	1	4	5	An argument outside a hookah bar in the early morning hours escalated when a shooter opened fire, wounding four, and killing one.
February 11	Springfield	Missouri	0	4	4	A driver shot at another car, wounding four people inside in northwest Springfield.
February 11	Phoenix (1)	Arizona	2	9	11	Responding to a call of a woman being shot, a shooter ambushed a responding officer and shot him several times. As a man fled the home with a baby, and officers attempted to aid in protecting the baby, the shooter shot four more officers, with four more being injured by bullet shrapnel. The shooter then barricaded himself inside the home, and was later found dead, along with a female victim.
February 6	Fresno (2)	California	2	2	4	A chance encounter between two rival gangs at an apartment complex in Southwest Fresno escalated into a shootout, with four gang members being shot, including a teenager. Two men died from their injuries.
February 6	Wilmington	North Carolina	0	4	4	A shooter fired at a crowd gathered to celebrate the life of a gun violence victim and wounded four, including a child and a teenager, in the Montgomery Place neighborhood.
February 6	North Lauderdale	Florida	0	4	4	In the early morning hours, a fight at a bar led to a patron being removed from the building, after which the patron opened fire from outside the bar and wounded four other patrons.
February 6	Romeoville	Illinois	0	5	5	A physical altercation in the early morning hours at a Bowlero bowling alley led to a shooting, with five people being wounded.
February 5	Corsicana (2) and Frost	Texas	6	2	8	A man shot four of his own family members, three fatally, in Corsicana before driving to Frost where he shot three more of his own family, killing two, including a child. After his vehicle was remotely shut off via a vehicle monitoring service, the Corsicana SWAT team closed in on his location. Before they could reach him, the shooter shot himself, and later died from his injuries.
February 5	Las Cruces	New Mexico	0	4	4	Four people were shot in southern Las Cruces, with two teenagers requiring medical evacuation via helicopter to El Paso.
February 4	Blacksburg	Virginia	1	4	5	Five people, including a college student at nearby Virginia Tech, which went on lockdown, were shot at a hookah lounge. One person succumbed to their injuries.
February 2	Oroville	California	1	4	5	Five people were wounded, one fatally, by a shooter in a Greyhound bus. The shooter was later apprehended by police at a nearby Walmart after he got into a physical altercation with a customer and took off all his clothes.
February 1	Milwaukee (2)	Wisconsin	0	5	5	A fight between two teenage girls about a Facebook post during a basketball game at Rufus King International High School escalated when a man opened fire, wounding four teenage girls, and an adult woman.
January 31	Raleigh (1)	North Carolina	0	4	4	Four people were shot at a motel in the late evening hours. Two of the victims were shot in the motel parking lot, while the other two were shot in their rooms.
January 30	Winter Haven	Florida	1	4	5	Two cars engaged in a running gun battle. Four people, including two teenagers, were shot in one of the cars, with a fifth also being wounded in the other car. An adult passenger in the first vehicle was killed.
January 30	Augusta (2)	Georgia	1	3	4	Four people were shot in the early morning hours at a club. A man was found dead by responding police.
January 29	Bakersfield	California	0	4	4	Four people were shot at a bar during the late evening hours in the Polo Grounds neighborhood.
January 29	St. Louis (1)	Missouri	3	1	4	Four men were shot near an intersection in the Kingsway East neighborhood, with two found dead at the scene. Another man died at a hospital, and the surviving victim ran to a nearby convenience store for help.
January 29	Atlanta (1)	Georgia	1	3	4	An argument escalated into a shooting outside a sports bar in the Vine City neighborhood shortly after midnight, with one person being fatally shot, and three others being injured by gunfire.
January 28	Goodlettsville	Tennessee	4	0	4	A man shot his wife and two children in a murder–suicide at his home.
January 27	Ducor	California	2	3	5	Two people were fatally shot at a Shell gas station between two cars with gang members, with three others being wounded, all those who were shot were gang members.
January 27	Washington (1)	District of Columbia	1	4	5	Five people were shot at a Days Inn hotel in the Forest Hills neighborhood. A woman later succumbed to her injuries.
January 23	Milwaukee (1)	Wisconsin	6	0	6	Six people were found by police shot to death in a home after being called there for a welfare check in the Park West neighborhood.
January 23	Inglewood	California	4	1	5	Four people were fatally shot at a birthday party at a home in the morning in an ambush-style attack. A fifth person was shot but survived their injuries. The woman whose birthday was being celebrated, along with her older sister, were among the deceased.
January 22	Midland	Washington	1	3	4	Four people were shot by an occupant in an approaching vehicle outside an apartment complex in the South End neighborhood while they were in two vehicles. Two of the victims drove away together to Tacoma, where one of them was found dead by police.
January 19	Contant	United States Virgin Islands	1	4	5	Four people were wounded after a drive-by shooting at a bar. An off-duty officer returned fire, killing one of the suspects.
January 19	Baltimore (1)	Maryland	3	1	4	Three men, including an on-duty violence-prevention worker, were fatally shot in the Milton-Monford neighborhood. Another man who was shot survived his injuries.
January 19	New Orleans (1)	Louisiana	0	4	4	Four men were injured when a vehicle approached them and multiple occupants opened fire upon them. The victims returned fire, and the attackers fled.
January 18	Miami (1)	Florida	1	4	5	After a man was escorted out of a bar for assaulting his female companion, he drove away, and later returned with a gun and opened fire on the bar's security guards, with three female patrons and one security guard being wounded. A security guard inside the bar returned fire, and killed the shooter.
January 17	San Antonio (2)	Texas	0	4	4	Four people were shot at a Martin Luther King Jr. Day gathering in the Coliseum Willow Park neighborhood.
January 16	Savannah	Georgia	1	3	4	Four people, including two teens, were shot in the Benjamin Van Clark Park neighborhood. A woman died from her injuries, and five vehicles were struck by gunfire.
January 15	Brunswick	Georgia	1	5	6	One person was killed, and five others injured, after two men shot at one another inside a club.
January 15	Knoxville (1)	Tennessee	0	4	4	Four women were shot in a parked car in the early morning hours. The driver then drove them all to a hospital.
January 14	Eugene	Oregon	0	6	6	A shooting broke out just before the start of a rap concert at W.O.W. Hall, resulting in six injuries.
January 14	Augusta (1)	Georgia	3	1	4	A man shot three people in southern Augusta, two fatally, before committing suicide.
January 13	New York City (1)	New York	1	3	4	Three men and a woman were shot inside of a rental hall in the Canarsie section of Brooklyn.
January 12	Chicago (1)	Illinois	0	4	4	Four people were wounded at the Parkway Garden Homes apartment complex in the Greater Grand Crossing neighborhood on the South Side, while standing on the sidewalk. A man approached them and opened fire before fleeing.
January 9	Los Angeles (1)	California	1 (Note: Including the perpetrator or suspect)	5	6	A gunman opened fire at a large party in South Los Angeles, wounding five people, while another party-goer returned fire and wounded the shooter. The shooter fled in a vehicle, which later crashed, and died at a hospital.
January 9	Montgomery	Alabama	1	6	7	A man was killed, and six others, including four bystanders, were wounded inside a bowling alley after an argument escalated. The shooter fled afterwards.
January 9	Fresno (1)	California	0	4	4	Four people were wounded outside a nightclub after an argument between two people escalated.
January 9	Colorado Springs (1)	Colorado	2	2	4	Responding officers found two people dead, and at least two injured, at an apartment complex in the early morning.
January 8	Houston (1)	Texas	1	3	4	A gunman opened fire outside a club, killing one, and wounding three others.
January 4	Jackson (1)	Mississippi	1	3	4	One teen was shot to death, while three other teens were injured while sitting in a car at a gas station.
January 2	Corsicana (1)	Texas	2	2	4	Two men were found deceased in a crashed car with multiple gunshots. Two other adults in the backseat were wounded.
January 2	San Antonio (1)	Texas	2	2	4	An altercation led to a shooting at an apartment complex. Two people were killed, and another was wounded, after bullets went through a wall. A fourth person was injured in another apartment.
January 1	Peoria	Illinois	2	3	5	Two women were killed, and three others wounded, in an early morning shooting.
January 1	Philadelphia (1)	Pennsylvania	1	4	5	A teenager was killed, and three adults and another teenager were wounded, in a shooting near Temple University.
January 1	Dillon	South Carolina	0	5	5	A shooter opened fire outside a nightclub and wounded five.
January 1	Auburn	Georgia	1	3	4	After officers were dispatched to respond to a domestic dispute at a home and they were en route, the call was upgraded to shots fired. Upon arriving, officers found a man had killed himself after shooting three people, including two children.
January 1	Kenosha (1)	Wisconsin	1	3	4	A man was killed, and three others wounded, in a shooting in a parking lot in the early morning.
January 1	South Bend (1)	Indiana	0	4	4	Four people were wounded at a shooting at a New Years party shortly after midnight.
January 1	Denver (1)	Colorado	2	2	4	Two adults were killed, and two wounded, in an early morning shooting in the LoDo district.
January 1	Columbia	Missouri	0	4	4	Four adults were wounded in the early morning in a shooting at a local bar.

== Monthly statistics ==
2022 US mass shooting statistics by month
Month	Mass shootings	Total number dead (including the shooters)	Total number wounded (including the shooters)	Occurred at a school or university	Occurred at a place of worship
January	40	52	128	0	0
February	40	40	174	1	1
March	53	47	219	0	0
April	66	76	271	1	0
May	69	91	318	1	1
June	73	81	297	0	0
July	101	88	439	0	0
August	71	77	262	0	0
September	70	56	272	0	0
October	40	67	236	0	0
November	43	65	169	2	0
December	30	26	117	0	0
Total	695	762	2,902	5	2
