= Safeway shooting =

Safeway shooting may refer to:

- 2011 Tucson shooting, near a Safeway in Casas Adobes, Arizona that killed 6 people and injured 14 others, including Gabby Giffords
- 2022 Bend, Oregon shooting, at a Safeway in Bend, Oregon that killed 2 people and injured 2 others
