= Chattanooga shooting =

Chattanooga shooting may refer to:

- 2015 Chattanooga shootings
- 2022 Chattanooga shooting
