= 2022 Greenwood Park Mall shooting =

Mass shooting in Indiana, US

Greenwood Park Mall shooting
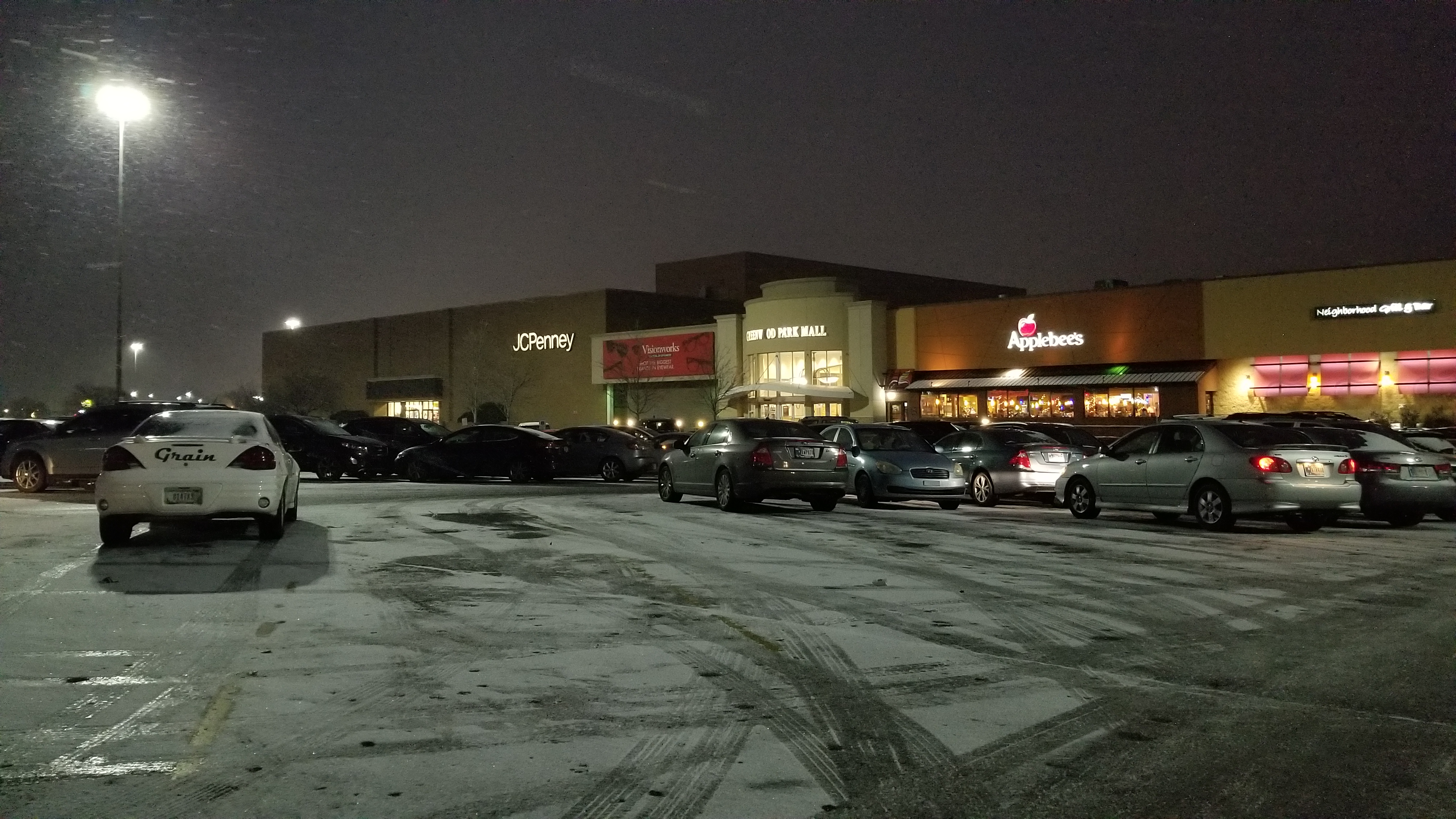
- An entrance to the mall, where the shooting occurred. Seen in November 2018
- Location: 39.6329°N 86.1205°W; Greenwood, Indiana, U.S.
- Date: July 17, 2022; 5:56 p.m. (EDT)
- Attack type: Mass shooting
- Weapons: Perpetrator: 5.56 NATO SIG Sauer M400 semi-automatic rifle; 5.56 NATO Smith & Wesson M&P15 semi-automatic rifle (unused; left at toilet); .357 SIG Glock 33 semi-automatic pistol (unused, but carried); Defender: 9mm Glock 19 semi-automatic pistol
- Deaths: 4 (including the perpetrator)
- Injuries: 2
- Perpetrator: Jonathan Douglas Sapirman
- Defender: Elisjsha Dicken
- Motive: Unknown

On July 17, 2022, a mass shooting occurred at the Greenwood Park Mall in Greenwood, Indiana, United States. The shooting began at 5:56 p.m. EDT (UTC−04:00) and lasted less than one minute. Three people were killed and two others were injured in the shooting before the perpetrator was fatally shot by 22-year-old Elisjsha Dicken, a legally-armed civilian bystander.

== Shooting ==
Around 4:55 p.m. on July 17, 2022, Jonathan Douglas Sapirman, a 20-year-old resident of Greenwood, walked a mile from his apartment to the mall, carrying a SIG Sauer M400 semi-automatic rifle, a Smith & Wesson M&P15 AR-15 style semi-automatic rifle, a Glock 33 pistol, and over 100 rounds of ammunition. He went into a restroom near the mall's food court and did not come out until an hour and two minutes later, at which point he started shooting.

At 5:56:48 p.m. on July 17, 2022, the perpetrator began firing into the food court area of the mall. He first shot and killed Indianapolis native Victor Gomez, 30, who was standing near the restroom entrance. He then turned and fired at a nearby table, fatally shooting Pedro Pineda, 56, and his wife Rosa, 37. He then continued to fire at mall patrons, wounding a 22-year-old woman and a 12-year-old girl.

Moments after the shooting began, Elisjsha Dicken, a legally-armed 22-year-old man from Seymour, engaged the shooter in a gunfight. Dicken, a civilian bystander, was shopping with his girlfriend when the perpetrator opened fire. Starting from a distance of forty yards, Dicken fired ten rounds from a Glock 19 handgun as he advanced on the shooter, hitting the shooter eight times. The shooter fired once and attempted to retreat into a restroom, but he was fatally injured and fell to the ground. He died soon afterwards.

Sapirman was neutralized within 15 seconds of exiting the bathroom. He discharged his rifle 24 times during the shooting.

Afterward, Dicken approached security guards at the mall, informed them that he had neutralized the shooter, and waited for police to arrive.

== Investigation ==
A bomb squad was also sent to the mall to investigate a suspicious backpack in one of the bathrooms near a Dick's Sporting Goods store. The backpack was later deemed not to be a threat.

The Indianapolis Metropolitan Police Department stated there was no ongoing threat during a 7:45 p.m. EDT news conference on the day of the shooting. Multiple agencies such as the Federal Bureau of Investigation, the Bureau of Alcohol, Tobacco, Firearms and Explosives, Department of Homeland Security, and the Johnson County Sheriff's Department are assisting in the investigation. However, the motive for the attack is still unclear.

Greenwood's Police Chief James Ison reported that the ammunition Sapirman purchased came from a Range USA store outside Interstate 65 between the borders of Greenwood and Indianapolis which Sapirman had frequented since 2020. Family members also told Greenwood Police that Sapirman frequented a local gun range at the Range USA store and began purchasing guns from various other stores across Greenwood, Southport, and Indianapolis.

CNN said that "few other details have emerged about Dicken", and that Dicken had refused to comment on events, in order to "respect the ongoing criminal investigation by the Greenwood Police Department and take time to honor the three innocent lives lost".

== Aftermath ==
Police and EMS crews arrived at the mall shortly after the shooting and secured the building. The wounded victims were sent to nearby hospitals to be treated for their injuries.

Sapirman's father and brother offered their condolences in a statement released through an attorney.

Sapirman's ex-girlfriend told the city's police chief that the shooter did not expect to reach the age of 21, and that he would "take others" with him if he committed suicide. Some of Sapirman's family members said that they were "unable to offer any explanation."

The Greenwood Park Mall reopened on July 19, 2022, at 11 a.m., a little under two days after the shooting.

== Defender ==
The mayor of Greenwood, Mark W. Myers, commended Elisjsha Dicken for preventing additional tragedy, stating, "On behalf of the city of Greenwood, I am grateful for his quick action and heroism in this situation." Governor Eric Holcomb, former Vice President Mike Pence, Senator Mike Braun, and other federal and state politicians made similar statements.

In addition to the commendations for Dicken, Indiana House, Senate Democrats, Representatives Mitch Gore and André Carson also expressed their sympathies towards the victims and their families, as well as speaking about the issue of gun violence in the United States. Greenwood police chief James Ison said at a news conference that Dicken was a "responsible armed citizen that took action very quickly", and that his actions had been "very proficient". According to investigators, Dicken had "no police training and no military training", and was taught how to shoot by his grandfather.

On July 24, 2022, Sapirman's father and older brother released a statement through an attorney conveying condolences to those affected and that they were "unable to explain [the gunman's] actions", that they were cooperating with law enforcement and that they held "no feelings of hostility toward Mr. Dicken".

== Perpetrator ==
Jonathan Douglas Sapirman (November 30, 2001 – July 17, 2022), the shooter, was a local resident and had no adult criminal history, but had gotten into a fight while attending Greenwood High School in the town of Greenwood, Indiana, and was a juvenile runaway. He had a job in a warehouse, which he quit in May 2022, and lived in an apartment from which he was facing eviction by July. Prior to the shooting, he burned his laptop in the oven of his apartment, put his cell phone in a toilet at the shopping center, and allegedly made at least one post on 4chan.

According to a press conference about the shooting, the shooter's most used social-media website was Reddit, where across a 5-year period from 2017 to 2022, he made over 700 comments on posts about mass shooters via his 2 Reddit accounts, u/greatergermanicreich and u/grobergermanic; however, none of the comments indicated he was planning on committing a shooting. Most of his posts were discussions or debates about other high-profile mass shootings around America. He acknowledged that he researched mass shooters and serial killers, and he seemingly enjoyed debating with others about the tactics, motives, and details about these incidents. Sapirman was also fascinated with Nazi Germany.

== See also ==
- List of mass shootings in the United States in 2022
- Indianapolis FedEx shooting
- 2023 Allen, Texas mall shooting
