= 2022 Phoenix shooting =

Mass shooting in Arizona, U.S.

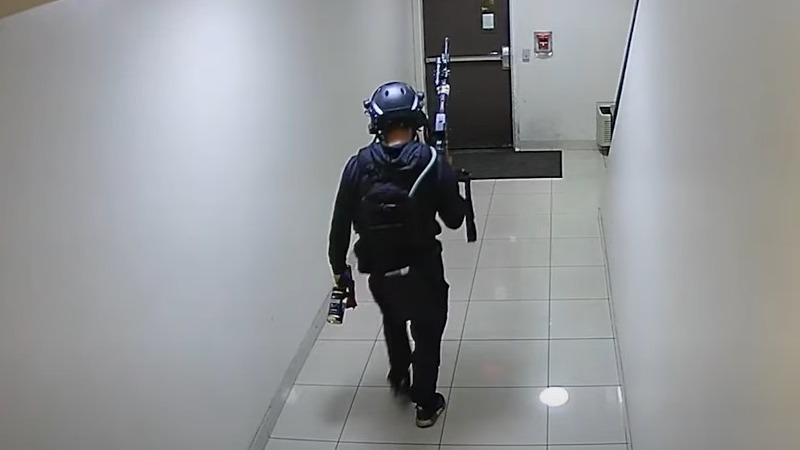
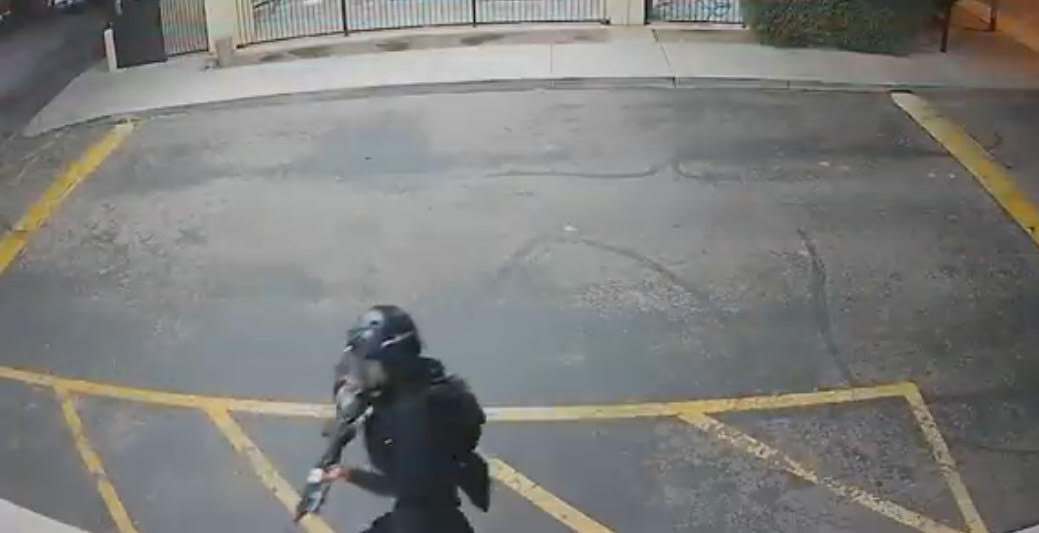
- Top: Williams exiting the motel moments before opening fire. Bottom: Williams outside the building.
- Location: Deer Valley, Phoenix, Arizona, U.S.
- Date: August 28, 2022; 8:28 p.m. – 8:45 p.m. (MDT; UTC−06:00)
- Target: Civilians
- Attack type: Mass shooting; double murder; shootout; murder–suicide
- Weapons: AR-15-style semi-automatic rifle; Taurus 9mm semi-automatic handgun; Molotov cocktail; Stun grenades (unused)
- Deaths: 3 (including the perpetrator)
- Injuries: 5
- Perpetrator: Isaiah Steven Williams
- Motive: Unknown

On August 28, 2022, a mass shooting occurred outside of a Days Inn motel in Phoenix, Arizona, United States. The perpetrator, 24-year-old Isaiah Steven Williams, wearing tactical equipment and armed with a rifle and explosive weapons, killed two people and wounded five others, including two police officers. A brief shootout ensued between the perpetrator and law enforcement before the incident ended when Williams committed suicide.

== Shooting ==
At around 8:25 p.m., Williams was observed on closed-circuit television cameras leaving a Days Inn Motel room that he had booked wearing a tactical vest, riot helmet, gas mask and knee pads. He was also carrying a semi-automatic AR-15–style rifle and Molotov cocktail, both of which would later be used in the attack. At 8:28 p.m., Williams was observed exiting the lobby of the motel, and immediately began to open fire on vehicles and buildings in his vicinity.

Seconds after Williams began shooting at random, a white car pulled into the motel parking lot and parked. Williams approached the vehicle, which had five occupants, and began systematically shooting through the windows, killing the driver and one other person. The three other occupants ran off, and were uninjured in the shooting.

After shooting at the car, Williams stepped back and continued to walk around the parking lot, shooting at vehicles and other structures at random. Williams discharged at least 12 rounds from his rifle during this phase of the shooting, which was also caught on video. Williams then walked towards an occupied restaurant and lit the Molotov cocktail before throwing it at one of the restaurant's windows, although the window did not break. After the Molotov cocktail failed to explode, Williams encountered multiple bystanders who were observing the shooting, but he did not let off any shots.

Williams continued to walk around the parking lot for several minutes, firing several shots, many of which hit observers of the shooting. Police arrived at the scene of the shooting at around the same time, and were immediately hit with gunfire when they stepped out of their patrol vehicle. Both officers in the vehicle were injured, but none of the injuries were fatal. One of the officers shot at Williams, although he was not hit.

A short time later the gunfire ceased and police walked up to Williams, who had killed himself with his rifle. During a later investigation, it was revealed that Williams also had several stun grenades in his possession, which were unused in the shooting. It was also revealed that the assailant discharged his rifle nearly 200 times during the skirmish.

== Victims ==
Two people were murdered by Williams during the attack, and five others were injured. The deceased victims were 36-year-old Misael Arevalo and 44-year-old Karla Garzona, who had arrived in the parking lot in a vehicle together when they were killed. The injured victims included two police officers, one of whom was shot by Williams in the shoulder and the other who suffered a shrapnel injury. The other three injured victims, who were civilians, suffered minor injuries.

== Aftermath ==
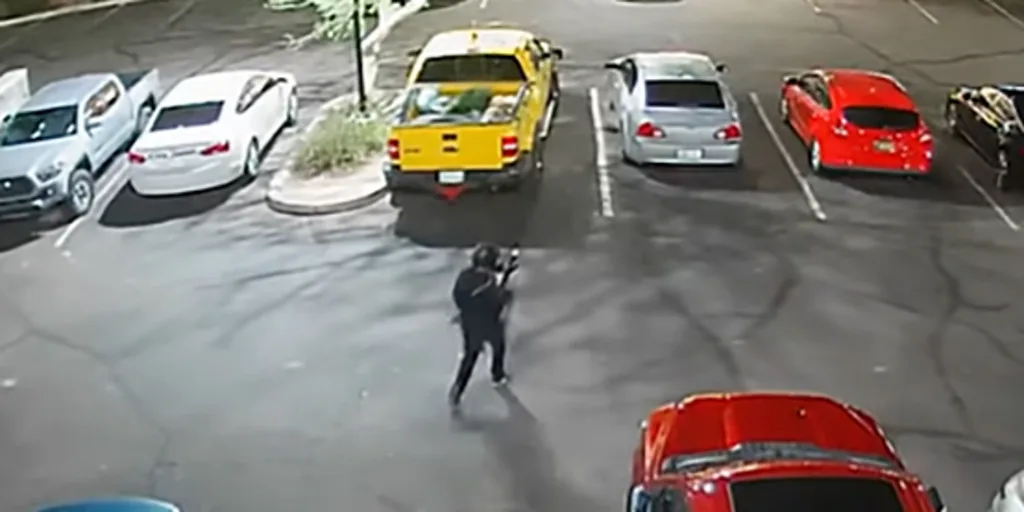
Williams firing his rifle at random cars in the parking lot.

=== Victims ===
Williams killed two people; they were identified as 44 year old Karla Garzona and 36 year old Misael Arévalo, both of whom were inside of a vehicle that Williams shot into. Five others, including three civilians and two police officers, were wounded by gunfire. One of the officers was shot in the shoulder, while the second was hit by shrapnel "in several places." The officer who was shot in the shoulder was sent to a hospital, while the three civilians were released without needed extensive medical treatment.

=== Investigation ===
In the immediate aftermath of the shooting, the Phoenix Police Department investigated Williams' motive. An internal investigation determining the legality of the officers' actions was carried out by the Maricopa County Attorney's Office, although the results of the investigation have not been made public.

=== Reactions ===
The Associated Press noted that the shooting occurred on the same day as unrelated shootings in Bend, Detroit, and Houston.

== Perpetrator ==
The Phoenix Police Department identified the perpetrator as 24-year-old Isaiah Steven Williams. Williams had graduated with a film studies degree from the Arizona State University prior the shooting, but was struggling to find a job. Although Williams had once expressed interest in becoming a police officer or soldier, he began posting anti-police and anti-government messages on several social media platforms in 2020, calling both systems "systemically corrupt." In April 2022, Williams' parents, concerned that he might harm himself, confiscated multiple weapons from him, including an AR-15–style rifle and a handgun. Several weeks before the shooting, Williams sold his car; and on the day of the shooting, he had expressed to a friend his desire to fight for the Kurdish forces in Iraq because "he wanted to fight for something." In those text messages, Williams also recommended a book called The Destruction of Black Civilization. Williams had bought a plane ticket to Houston after he sold his car. Williams also told his parents that he was going to Texas and then possibly leaving the United States but returned to Arizona a few days later.

== See also ==
- Phoenix freeway shootings, a series of shootings in 2015.
- 2022 Bend, Oregon shooting, occurred on the same day.
