= 2022 Near North Side shooting =

Mass shooting in Illinois, U.S.

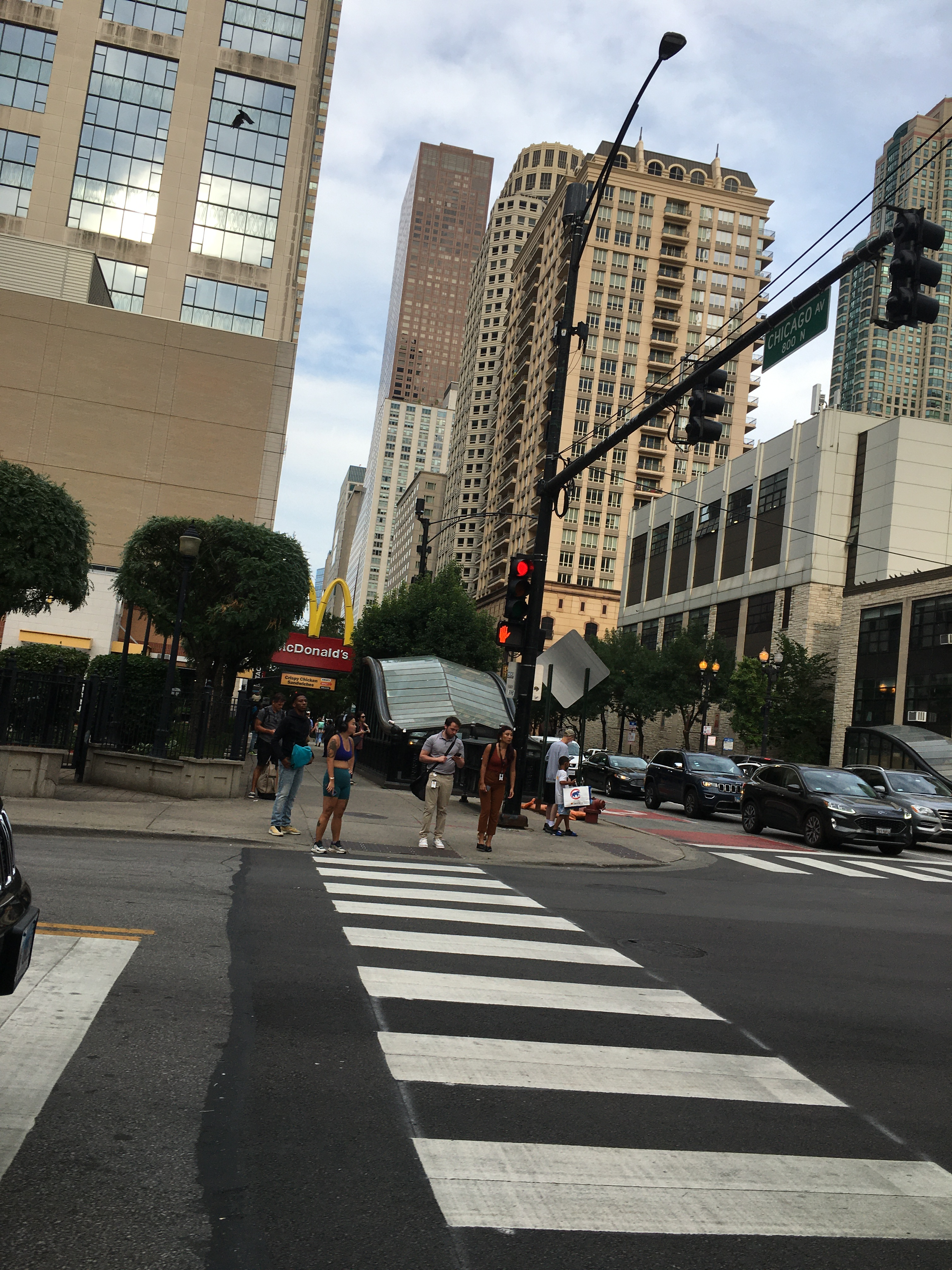
- The McDonald's establishment and the CTA Chicago station entrance where the shooting occurred
- Location: 800 North State Street, Chicago, Illinois, U.S.
- Date: May 19, 2022; 10:40 – c. 11:30 p.m. (CDT; UTC−05:00)
- Attack type: Mass shooting
- Weapon: 9mm Glock 19 (modified with Glock switch)
- Deaths: 2
- Injuries: 8
- Perpetrator: Jaylun Sanders

On May 19, 2022, a mass shooting occurred in Chicago, Illinois, United States, in the city's Near North Side neighborhood, near Michigan Avenue. Two people were killed, and eight others were injured. The perpetrator, Jaylun Sanders, was taken into custody by Chicago police.

== Shooting ==
The shooting occurred at about 10:40 p.m. CDT (UTC−05:00), near a McDonald's establishment on the Near North Side neighborhood of Chicago. The incident occurred a few blocks from the city's Magnificent Mile shopping district. The shooting happened as a result of an altercation outside the McDonald's restaurant. The cause of the altercation is not yet known; however it was described as "personal" by detectives. The shooting was triggered when police officers, who were near the area noticed two groups engaging in a fight. They found 21 spent shell casings at the scene.

After the shooting, the suspect fled and caused a chase between police officials to the Chicago station of the city's Red Line. Amid the chase, a woman fell onto the tracks and was electrocuted at the State Street subway. Passengers from this station were evacuated at around 11:30 p.m., an hour after the shooting.

Several of the victims were hospitalized at Northwestern Memorial Hospital. All wounded victims were reported under serious condition.

The shooting was significant because it happened a week after a shooting in downtown Chicago's Millennium Park where a teen was shot and killed and led the city to enforce a curfew for young people.

Three days after the shooting, 21-year-old Chicago native Jaylun Sanders was identified as the suspect. The weapon used was a Glock 19 handgun that Sanders had purchased from a relative in Indiana. The Glock was also outfitted with a device which allows fully automatic fire.

== Victims ==
Two people were killed in the shooting, one of the victims being 30-year-old Antonio Wade. Wade was one of the individuals involved in the altercation that led to the shooting. The incident was recorded by several cell phones nearby the crime scene. The second victim was 31-year-old Anthony Allen, who was shot in the back of the head and was hospitalized at John H. Stroger Jr. Hospital of Cook County.

== Aftermath ==
In the aftermath of the shooting, a suspect was arrested by police on May 20, 2022. Another person was arrested for obstructing the officers from making an arrest at the scene. In response to the shooting, Mayor Lori Lightfoot called the shooting "an outrageous act of violence" and announced that the city would increase police presence near the area of the shooting. The Chicago Tribune reported that during the shooting, a fight had happened between a witness and police officials. In June, a juvenile was arrested in connection with the shooting after turning himself in to the police.

Lightfoot and Superintendent of the Chicago Police Department David Brown blamed the shooting on the parents of the suspects.

In November 2024, Jaylun Sanders pleaded guilty to one count of first degree murder after more than 40 additional charges against him were dropped. His guilty plea came a year after a second man, Kameron Abram, was sentenced to seven years for weapons charges. Sanders was then sentenced to 43 years in prison.

== See also ==
- List of mass shootings in the United States in 2022
- List of homicides in Illinois
