= 2022 Bend, Oregon shooting =

Mass shooting in Oregon, U.S.

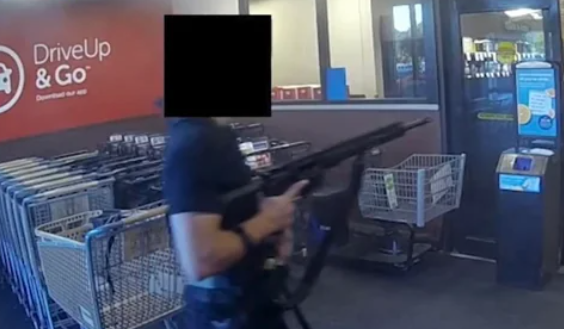
- CCTV still of Miller entering the Safeway store while holding a rifle
- Location: 44°03′28″N 121°15′54″W; Bend, Oregon, U.S.
- Date: August 28, 2022; 4 years ago c. 7:03 – 7:08 p.m. (PDT; UTC−05:00)
- Attack type: Mass shooting; murder-suicide; workplace shooting
- Weapons: Radical Firearms RF-15 AR-15–style rifle; 12-gauge Stevens Model 320; Sawed-off Remington 870 (unused; left in truck); 3 Molotov cocktails (unused; left in truck)
- Deaths: 3 (including the perpetrator)
- Injuries: 2
- Perpetrator: Ethan Blair Miller
- Defender: Donald Ray Surrett Jr.
- Motive: Misanthropy; Thrill; Suicidal ideation; Homicidal ideation

On August 28, 2022, 20-year-old Ethan Blair Miller opened fire at a Safeway grocery store in Bend, Oregon, killing two men, one of whom was an employee, and wounding two other people before committing suicide.

== Shooting ==
The gunman, 20-year-old Ethan Blair Miller, was captured on Ring Doorbell surveillance leaving his Fox Hollow apartment building at 7:03 pm, armed with an AR-15 style rifle and a 12-gauge shotgun. Miller wore a green satchel containing ammunition, a tactical vest and a black shirt with the word HURT in dark red lettering across his chest in reference to the song "Hurt" by Nine Inch Nails. He then fired three shots into his own vehicle, a 1997 Ford F-250, in the parking lot of the apartment building. Miller was then caught on surveillance walking through the parking lot between an Old Navy and a Costco. He opened fire, hitting stacks of hot tubs, a parked van, and wounding the driver of a moving black Honda Civic with glass and shrapnel as he shot through the passenger-side window.

At 7:05 pm, Miller reached the Forum shopping center parking lot, where he fired into a Big Lots store adjacent to Safeway. Upon reaching the west entrance of the Safeway, he shot Glenn Edward Bennett, an 84-year-old customer, five times, striking near his groin, right arm and left thigh. Two other shoppers of the grocery store fled when the shooting started, but later returned to help Bennett, who had been lying on the ground. Bennett later died from his injuries in the hospital.

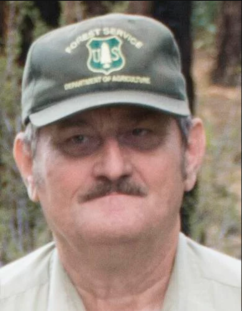
Surrett Jr., who engaged Miller during the attack, during his time in the United States Forest Service

Miller then moved farther into the store, firing into aisles as he progressed. He was then seen walking over to the meat section where he confronted a hiding person lying on the ground, firing a shot beside him and continuing, leaving the customer unharmed. Miller then continued toward the produce section. As Miller walked past a produce cart, Donald Ray Surrett Jr., a 66-year-old employee and U.S. army veteran, who had crouched behind a display in the store after he heard gunshots, lunged at Miller with a produce knife, forcing Miller to drop his shotgun. Police later said that this act likely saved the lives of others. Surrett then fell to the ground which prompted Miller to shoot him once with his rifle. He then dropped the rifle, picked up the shotgun, and shot Surrett twice, killing him.

Miller then continued down the produce aisle where he proceeded to sit back against a shelf, place the shotgun under him, and fire upwards, committing suicide.

After receiving an emergency 911 call, officers entered the grocery store from the front and back. At 7:08pm, Miller was found dead from a self-inflicted gunshot wound. The entire event was captured on video footage and a censored version was later released 95 days after the shooting.

In total, Miller fired more than 100 rounds. Law enforcement recovered more than 100 shell casings from the gunman's apartment complex, The Forum shopping center, and the interior of the Safeway. Three molotov cocktails and a sawed-off Remington 870 shotgun were also found in the shooter's truck.

== Perpetrator ==
Ethan Blair Miller (October 31, 2001 – August 28, 2022), a 20-year-old Bend resident, was identified as the gunman. Prior to the shooting, he lived at the nearby Fox Hollow apartment building with his mother and his younger brother. Miller was also a former employee of Safeway. The weapons Miller used in the attack were purchased legally.

Miller wrote a private digital journal starting on June 29 on Wattpad titled "The Downward Spiral of Ethan Miller", which was named after the Nine Inch Nails album The Downward Spiral. In this journal, he detailed his plan and motivations for committing a mass shooting. Miller wrote that he wanted to murder people due to his isolation, loneliness, feuds with his family, and frustrations at being unable to find a girlfriend. He also wrote lyrics from The Downward Spiral album and other artists such as Disturbed and KMFDM. He had initially wanted to commit a school shooting at his former high school, being inspired by the Columbine High School massacre, but chose to target the Safeway instead, feeling that he could not wait until school would resume on September 8th. Miller also posted photos and videos of himself with guns on Instagram and YouTube.

== Reactions ==
Kate Brown, the governor of Oregon, thanked first responders for their quick response to the shooting. She further stated that her heart went out to the victims' families, and that everyone has the right to safety from gun violence. On September 2, Brown, along with police chief Mike Krantz, fire chief Todd Riley, city manager Eric King, and Bend City Council members met privately with officers and other first responders at the Bend Fire Station. Additionally, Brown encouraged Oregonians to vote for Measure 114, a gun control bill, on Oregon's fall ballot.

Senator Ron Wyden stated that the Oregonians who were present at the shooting needed our thoughts and prayers, and that the United States can't ignore another mass shooting when there are people grieving over the loss of their friends and family.

The Associated Press noted that the shooting occurred on the same day as unrelated shootings in Phoenix, Detroit, and Houston.

== See also ==
- List of filmed mass shootings
- List of homicides in Oregon
- Crime in Oregon
- Mass shootings in the United States
- Gun violence in the United States
- Workplace violence
- Columbine effect
- 2022 Phoenix shooting, another mass shooting that occurred on the same day
- Silver Rail Elementary School shooting, another mass shooting that occurred in the same city four years later
