= 2022 Okmulgee murders =

Serial murder case in Oklahoma, US

- Location: Okmulgee, Oklahoma, US
- Date: October 9, 2022
- Attack type: Shooting, murder, dismemberment, homicide, androcide
- Deaths: 4
- Victims: Mark Chastain, age 32; Billy Chastain, age 30; Mike Sparks, age 32; Alex Stevens, age 29
- Accused: Joseph Lloyd Kennedy II

On the evening of October 9, 2022, four men were reported missing for several days after being last seen riding their bicycles in Okmulgee, Oklahoma, United States. All were found fatally shot, dismembered in half, and being thrown to the Deep Fork River. The four victims were identified as Mark Chastain, age 32; Billy Chastain, age 30; Mike Sparks, age 32; and Alex Stevens, age 29.

Shortly after the killings, a 67-year-old man fled from Oklahoma to Florida, before being captured during a traffic stop and extradited back to Oklahoma the following month where he faced murder charges. The murders were carried out near the man's scrapyard where he allegedly fatally shot all his victims. Authorities discovered their bodies at Deep Fork on October 14.

== Victims ==
The four male victims, Mark Chastain, Billy Chastain, Mike Sparks, and Alex Stevens, are all local residents from Okmulgee, with Billy Chastain being Mark's younger brother.

== Suspect ==
Authorities identified the suspect as 67-year-old Joseph Lloyd Kennedy II of Okmulgee. Kennedy was born on February 16, 1955, lived in Okmulgee throughout his life, and had an extensive criminal history. One of his arrest reports includes assault and battery on a law enforcement officer charges in connection with a January 7, 2012 shooting incident that wounded another man at Kennedy's business, the A&A Auto Salvage shop, after six intruders broke into the store. Authorities recovered a .380 caliber pistol and the shooting was confirmed to have happened "without justifiable or excusable cause". Despite being released on probation, Okmulgee authorities also issued an arrest warrant for Kennedy related to a felony sentence deferred for 10 years that he received in Okmulgee County District Court the following year in May 2013 in connection of the incident.

== Arrest and investigation ==
Court documents released by KTUL-TV confirms that a video shows Kennedy left the scrapyard wearing a different shirt than he arrived during the evening hours and then left the area in his PT Cruiser. Kennedy returned to park at a parking lot leading to the Great Plains Coca-Cola Bottling Plant after midnight on October 10 in his stolen Tacoma belonging to a friend of his. He left his Tacoma and walked north twice before driving his truck to the vacant lot that borders the scrapyard, known as Pine Field. During investigation, officers found Mark Chastain's personal items all covered in blood alongside numerous 7.62 caliber shell casings and a broken set of dentures.

Shortly after the murders, Kennedy drove 1,200 miles (1,900 km) from Okmulgee to Daytona Beach Shores, Florida, where he resided until his arrest. Back in Oklahoma, authorities discovered a blue Chrysler PT Cruiser with Oklahoma license places that was found abandoned by deputies at a warehouse in nearby Morris, according to the Okmulgee County Sheriff's Office. A Daytona Beach Shores Department of Public Safety director told authorities that a police license plate reader detected a black Toyota Tundra, listing the driver as "missing" and the car as "stolen out of Okmulgee County". Kennedy was arrested during a traffic stop and made his first court appearance in Daytona Beach where he appeared in front of a Volusia County judge who ordered him to continue to be held without bail on a Grand Theft Auto charge citing public safety, regarding to the Oklahoma incident. Kennedy was extradited back to Oklahoma on November 14, 2022. His charges were upgraded to first-degree murder during a bond hearing pertaining to related auto theft charges, and is held at the Okmulgee County Detention Center on a $10,000,000 bond.

A witness told authorities that the men were invited to "hit a lick big enough for all of them", despite investigators believing that the victims planned to “commit some type of criminal act” prior to their disappearances. While being questioned by officers, Kennedy was cooperative and denied knowing the four victims. During the interview, Kennedy told Daytona Beach Shores police that he was suicidal and planned to leap from a hotel balcony. The mother of both Mark and Brian Chastain spoke to KOKI-TV, saying that the last time she saw both Mark and Brian was them looking for their phones and leaving after finding them.

Sources from CBS affiliate KOTV-TV confirms that Kennedy was immediately named a person of interest after investigators found blood at a property next to his salvage yard where the four victims were murdered. On December 1, 2022, an unsealed affidavit signed by Assistant District Attorney Carman Rainbolt confirms that during the early morning hours of October 15, Kennedy visited a woman in Gore, Oklahoma, telling her that he killed and dismembered the four men on the night of their disappearance because they were stealing from him, and claims that he allegedly had a bicycle of one of the victims with him.

As of May 2026, Kennedy is awaiting a bench trial, which he currently stayed for competency review, and waived his rights to a jury trial.
