= North Elizabeth Street, Lexington =

Neighborhood in Lexington, Kentucky

Coordinates: 38.032°N 84.512°W

North Elizabeth Street is a neighborhood in southwestern Lexington, Kentucky, United States. It is located just west of the University of Kentucky and most of its residents are college students.

Neighborhood statistics

- Area: 0.164 square miles (0.42 km^{2})
- Population: 1,180
- Population density: 7,191 people per square mile
- Median household income: $18,138
