= 2022 Chattanooga shooting =

Mass shooting in Tennessee, U.S.

- Location: Chattanooga, Tennessee, US
- Date: June 5, 2022
- Attack type: Mass shooting, homicide
- Deaths: 3 (2 by gunfire, 1 by vehicular homicide)
- Injuries: 14 (12 by gunfire)
- Accused: Garrian Dwayne King; Alexis Boynton Lewis; Rodney Junior Harris Jr.

On June 5, 2022, two people were killed and 14 others were injured in a mass shooting in Chattanooga, Tennessee, United States. Another person was killed fleeing the shooting and two were injured by vehicles while fleeing.

== Shooting ==
Responding officers arrived at around 2:42 am at a reported shooting near a night club. They found multiple victims, immediately began first aid and secured the scene. Victims sustained injuries from gunfire and from fleeing the scene, with fourteen struck by gunfire and three struck by vehicles while attempting to flee. Three were confirmed dead, two by gunshots and one by being hit by a vehicle, with fourteen injured.

== Investigation ==
Chattanooga Police Chief Celeste Murphy said there were multiple shooters. Officials believed that the shooting was targeted, and that there did not appear to be an active public safety threat related to the incident.

On June 8, 2022, 28-year-old Garrian Dwayne King (born March 4, 1994) was arrested and charged with being a felon in possession of a firearm in connection with the shooting. According to the affidavit filed in U.S. District Court for Chattanooga, King was one of three men seen on security camera video exiting a stolen Chevrolet Suburban after 2 a.m. before the shooting. On June 13, 2022, 36-year-old Alexis Boynton Lewis (born December 16, 1985) was charged with criminal homicide, reckless endangerment, and possession of a firearm during the commission or attempt to commit a dangerous felony. The following day, 31-year-old Rodney Junior Harris Jr., who was shot seventeen times and also run over by a car during the incident, was charged with possession of a firearm by a convicted felon. Walking using a cane and having his right arm in a brace, he was sentenced in November, 2023 to five years in federal prison. In 2023, Garrian King was sentenced to 110 months in prison plus 3 years of supervised release.

== Response ==
Mayor Tim Kelly called on Congress to address gun violence. He said, "That doesn't mean taking guns away from responsible gun owners, but it does mean mandatory background checks and prohibiting high-capacity magazines."

== See also ==
- 2015 Chattanooga shootings
- Gun violence in the United States
- List of mass shootings in the United States in 2022
