= Murder of Linda Goldstone =

1978 kidnapping, rape and murder of a childbirth instructor in Chicago, Illinois

Linda Goldstone
- Born: Linda Irene Meyers; July 17, 1948; Chicago, Illinois, U.S.
- Died: April 1, 1978 (aged 29); Chicago, Illinois, U.S.
- Cause of death: Gunshot wound
- Resting place: Shalom Memorial Park
- Known for: Victim of a kidnapping, rape, and murder case

On March 30, 1978, 29-year-old Linda Goldstone (July 17, 1948 – April 1, 1978), a childbirth instructor, was kidnapped from the Northwestern Memorial Hospital's parking lot in Chicago, Illinois, United States. Goldstone was held captive for about 36 hours inside the trunk of her abductor, who drove around the city and also raped her at least twice, before he finally shot her to death. The perpetrator, Hernando Williams, was out on bail for unrelated charges of rape and kidnapping at the time of the offence.

Williams was later identified as the killer and arrested for the murder of Goldstone. On October 9, 1979, Williams pleaded guilty to aggravated kidnapping, robbery, rape, and murder, and on March 14, 1980, he was sentenced to death upon the jury's unanimous recommendation for capital punishment. Williams was eventually executed by lethal injection at the Stateville Correctional Center on March 22, 1995.

== Abduction and killing ==
On March 30, 1978, in Chicago, Illinois, a childbirth instructor was kidnapped and later murdered by her abductor.

Williams's final IDOC photo before his execution (early 1990s)

On that evening, the victim, 29-year-old Linda Goldstone, who worked at the Northwestern Memorial Hospital, was alighting from her car in the parking lot of the hospital, when she encountered 22-year-old Hernando Williams, who threatened and robbed her at gunpoint. At the time, Williams was out on bail awaiting trial for a previous kidnapping and rape charge. In that case, Williams had kidnapped and raped a woman at gunpoint at Evergreen Park in 1977.

Background information revealed that Williams's father was a canvas product manufacturer and assistant pastor, and Williams, who dropped out of high school, had previously served six years in the National Guard and joined a local church as a choir singer. At the time of the offence, Williams was also married with a two-year-old daughter but he separated from his wife Shirley Coleman just weeks prior.

After robbing the victim, Williams forced Goldstone to partially undress from the waist down, before he forced her into the trunk of his car and held her captive for approximately 36 hours. On the same day he kidnapped the victim, Williams took Goldstone to a shop owned by his father, where he tied up her hands and feet. He also continued to keep her in the trunk while driving his sister home and later to a motel, where he raped Goldstone.

The following day, on March 31, 1978, Williams showed up in a suburban court to attend a hearing regarding the charges of aggravated kidnaping, rape and armed robbery pending against him. At the same time, Goldstone was still bound and confined within the trunk of Williams' car, which he drove to the courtroom. Several witnesses in the area reportedly heard cries for help coming from the trunk of Williams' car, and this caused one of them to file a police report. Williams, who got wind of this, drove away from a crowd that had gathered and proceeded to a tavern where he visited other friends.

Later that evening, Goldstone's husband, a physician, reported her missing after he found out that his wife did not turn up for her class. Simultaneously, Williams had arrived at another motel in Chicago, where he raped Goldstone a second time. By then, the police began searching for the car of Williams. The following morning, on April 1, 1978, Goldstone called her husband, promising that she'd be home soon. Williams then told Goldstone that he would release her, but warned her not to call the police.

After Williams drove off, Goldstone ignored his instruction, ran to a nearby house for help, and asked the man inside, Chester Bukowiec, to call the police. Unaware that Goldstone had been kidnapped, Chester did not let her inside the house, a decision that she later regretted. Williams circled back to ensure that Goldstone had followed his instructions. Upon realizing that he she hadn't, he kidnapped her a second time. Afterwards, he took Goldstone to an abandoned garage, where he shot and killed her.

== Trial of Hernando Williams ==
Hernando Williams was arrested at his home for the murder of Linda Goldstone on the afternoon of April 1, 1978, the same day he committed the crime. He was consequently charged with the kidnapping, rape and murder of Goldstone, and under Illinois state law, the death penalty was applied for murder offences under certain aggravating circumstances. In response to the arrest of Williams, the unnamed victim of the Evergreen Park rape case stated that she was terrified when she heard that Williams was out on bail for kidnapping and raping her, and added that the death of Goldstone made her grapple with the fact that she would have potentially ended up dead like Goldstone.

On April 12, 1978, a Cook County grand jury formally indicted Williams for aggravated kidnapping, rape, armed robbery and murder. Williams reportedly entered a plea of innocence in a pre-trial hearing. Before his murder trial was carried out, Williams was first put on trial for the Evergreen Park abduction-rape case he committed prior to the murder of Goldstone. He was therefore found guilty of the charges on July 13, 1978, and sentenced to 30 years in prison.

On October 9, 1979, Williams stood trial for the murder of Goldstone, and during the hearing, Williams pleaded guilty to all four offences of aggravated kidnapping, robbery, rape, and murder, and his sentencing trial was conducted before a Cook County jury. The prosecution reportedly sought the death penalty for Williams, who reportedly called himself a "monster" while he testified on the stand and asked the jury for mercy on his life.

On December 8, 1979, the jury unanimously recommended the death penalty for Williams.

On March 14, 1980, Criminal Court Judge James E. Strunck formally sentenced 24-year-old Hernando Williams to death by the electric chair.

== Appellate process ==
On May 27, 1983, Williams's appeal was dismissed by the Illinois Supreme Court.

On November 21, 1985, the Illinois Supreme Court rejected a second appeal from Williams.

On July 5, 1990, Williams's appeal was denied by U.S. District Judge Marvin Aspen of the U.S. District Court for the Northern District of Illinois.

On October 1, 1991, the 7th Circuit Court of Appeals turned down Williams's appeal.

On June 23, 1992, the U.S. Supreme Court rejected Williams' final appeal, therefore confirming the death penalty in his case.

== Execution ==
=== First death warrant ===
Originally, Hernando Williams was scheduled to be executed on January 21, 1993, after the Illinois Supreme Court signed his death warrant in September 1992.

However, due to legal issues, U.S. District Judge Marvin Aspen granted Williams a stay of execution, which was eventually lifted in April 1993, and the prosecution filed a new motion to seek another death warrant for Williams.

=== Second death warrant and final appeals ===
Two years later, Williams' death sentence was rescheduled to be carried out on March 22, 1995. Coincidentally, James Free, who was found guilty of the 1978 rape and murder of Bonnie Serpico, was also ordered to be executed on the same date as Williams, which marked the first double execution in Illinois in more than 42 years, as well as the first double execution outside of the South since the 1970s. The last double execution was carried out on October 17, 1952, when two convicted murderers, LeRoy Lindsay and Berenice Davis, were executed by the electric chair at the Cook County Jail. When the death warrant was finalized by February 1995, Williams attempted to appeal to the 7th Circuit Court of Appeals for another stay of execution, but it was denied on February 24, 1995.

As a final recourse to spare Williams' life, his defence counsel petitioned for clemency and asked the governor to commute his death sentence to life imprisonment without the possibility of parole, submitting that Williams became a model prisoner behind bars and demonstrated remorse for his crime, and also counselled other inmates to steer them away from crime. In the end, Illinois Governor Jim Edgar refused clemency for both Williams and Free on March 15, 1995. Williams also filed last-minute court appeals to delay his execution, but the Illinois Supreme Court and 7th Circuit Court of Appeals denied both appeals.

=== Lethal injection ===
On March 22, 1995, 40-year-old Hernando Williams was executed via lethal injection at the Stateville Correctional Center. Williams, whose execution was carried out about an hour after Free was executed, was pronounced dead at 1:49am; the official time of death was 12:42am in Free's case. Williams reportedly did not make a final statement.

For his last meal, Williams ordered shrimp, french fries, strawberry cheesecake and soda. Williams was also the first African-American convict to be executed in Illinois after the August 24, 1962, execution of James Dukes for murdering a Chicago police officer. Nic Howell, spokesperson of the Illinois Department of Corrections, briefly described in a media statement that both executions went "smoothly".

The executions of Free and Williams marked the first double execution to occur outside the South in 30 years. About 16 years after the executions, Illinois abolished the death penalty in 2011; a total of 12 men – including Free, Williams and notorious serial killer John Wayne Gacy – were executed in Illinois prior to the abolition.

=== Controversy ===
During the month when Hernando Williams was slated to be executed, it came to public attention that Williams was actually the former husband of Shirley Coleman, a politician who was participating in her re-election campaign as alderman of the 16th ward in Chicago. During Coleman's re-election campaign, one of her opponents reportedly commented that Coleman was responsible for Williams' rape and murder spree back in 1978, because she "may not have been giving the man what he needed at home". His comment sparked controversy and criticism from Cook County Democratic Women and several officials, who perceived it as casting the blame on Coleman for the crimes committed by her ex-husband. Eventually, the politician apologized but stated that he meant to say that Coleman should have provided more moral and emotional support to Williams and that his comment was taken out of context and wrongly perceived to have sexual connotations. Coleman was eventually re-elected as alderman sometime after the execution of her ex-husband.

== See also ==
- List of kidnappings (1970–1979)
- List of homicides in Illinois
- Capital punishment in Illinois
- List of people executed in Illinois
- List of people executed in the United States in 1995

Executions carried out in Illinois
Preceded by James P. Free Jr. March 22, 1995	Hernando Williams; March 22, 1995	Succeeded by Girvies Davis May 17, 1995
Executions carried out in the United States
Preceded by James P. Free Jr. – Illinois March 22, 1995	Hernando Williams – Illinois; March 22, 1995	Succeeded by Noble Mays Jr. – Texas April 6, 1995
