= Raymond Lee Stewart =

American spree killer (1952–1996)

- Stewart in 1982
- Born: January 21, 1952; Burlington, North Carolina, U.S.
- Died: September 18, 1996 (aged 44); Stateville Correctional Center, Crest Hill, Illinois, U.S.
- Cause of death: Execution by lethal injection
- Motive: Rage; Revenge; Anti-white racism
- Convictions: Illinois; Murder (3 counts); Armed robbery (4 counts); Wisconsin; First degree murder (2 counts); Armed robbery
- Penalty: Illinois; Death; Wisconsin; Life imprisonment

Details
- Date: January 27, 1981 – February 2, 1981
- Country: United States
- Locations: Rockford, Illinois and Beloit, Wisconsin
- Killed: 6
- Weapons: Two .38-caliber revolvers: Smith & Wesson; RG Industries
- Date apprehended: February 21, 1981

Raymond Lee Stewart (January 21, 1952 – September 18, 1996) was an American robber and spree killer who murdered six people during a week-long rampage in Rockford, Illinois, and Beloit, Wisconsin, in 1981. Stewart was sentenced to death for the murders he committed in Illinois and was executed in 1996 at Stateville Correctional Center.

== Background ==
Stewart was born in Burlington, North Carolina, in 1952, and was raised in an abusive environment. According to Faith Crocker, one of Stewart's sisters, his father frequently physically and sexually abused his nine children and threw Stewart out of the house when he was 14 years old, telling him to never come back. Stewart dropped out of high school and drifted through several jobs. At some point, Stewart moved to Rockford, Illinois. In 1973, he committed several robberies. He later pleaded guilty to four counts of armed robbery and was sentenced to 5 to 15 years in prison. An additional robbery count was dropped due to a lack of evidence, and Stewart was paroled after serving six years.

== Murder spree ==
In December 1980, Stewart pulled a gun on a landlord who had refused to return a $50 security deposit. A month later, he learned that his girlfriend had given birth to their daughter and then had her tubes tied without telling him. Both events culminated in Stewart becoming increasingly angry. Years later, he said that he also wanted revenge for his prior robbery conviction.

On the afternoon of January 27, 1981, Stewart shot and killed Willie Fredd, a 54-year-old store owner who had witnessed one of the robberies committed by Stewart in 1973, and his stock boy, 20-year-old Albert Pearson, in Rockford's west side, using a .38-caliber revolver. The next day, Stewart shot and killed Kevin Kaiser, an 18-year-old service station attendant, at a gas station two miles away. Within 24 hours, Stewart killed Kenny Foust, a 35-year-old service station attendant.

Stewart's rampage ended at a shopping mall in Beloit, Wisconsin, where Richard Boeck, 21, and Donald Rains, 26, were both found shot in the head inside a RadioShack. Stewart had led the two men to the back of the store before shooting them multiple times.

After police connected the murders to Stewart, he was tracked down and arrested in Greensboro, North Carolina on February 21, 1981.

== Trial, imprisonment, and execution ==
Stewart was tried and convicted of three of the four murders he committed in Illinois and for the two murders he committed in Wisconsin. He was sentenced to two consecutive life terms for the murders he committed in Wisconsin and sentenced to death for the murders he committed in Illinois. During one of his murder trials in April 1982, Stewart fled the courtroom and attempted to hide in an oilcan. He sustained a shoulder wound during his escape attempt.

After exhausting his appeals, Stewart had an execution date set. At a clemency hearing with the Illinois Prisoner Review Board, Stewart submitted a 15-minute taped statement. He claimed that he hated white people at the time of the murders, since white people were responsible for the deaths of his childhood idols, John F. Kennedy and Martin Luther King Jr. Some noted that this did not fully explain what he had done since Stewart's first two victims, Fredd and Pearson, were both black. Stewart also mentioned the incidents with his girlfriend and landlord, as well as his anger over his robbery conviction. After explaining himself, Stewart expressed remorse, saying "All these crimes were morally and legally wrong. I want to apologize." He admitted that he personally believed that he deserved what he was getting, saying "The victims had not done anything to me. It was as if I was playing games with the police. In my way of thinking, I deserve the death penalty."

Stewart on August 2, 1996, just over a month before his execution

At his clemency hearing, Constance Mitchell, the cousin of Willie Fredd and mother of Albert Pearson, supported Stewart's bid to receive a positive recommendation from the board for his sentence to be commuted to life in prison without parole, as she did not believe in capital punishment. "I believe with all my heart that my son is in heaven," Mitchell said. She said she opposed the death penalty and that only God has the right to take a life away. "I must learn to forgive him or I will carry this pain with me until I die," she said. However, most of the other relatives of Stewart's victims were adamantly opposed to clemency.

"Please, don't let this man escape his punishment," said Willie Fredd's son, Alex Fredd. "He deserves the death penalty. He has to pay for what he did. Not to my father, but to me." Alex said he became an alcoholic, dropped out of school, and watched the health of his mother and grandmother worsen after Stewart murdered Willie. Alex said he often thought about how he learned about what happened. He said he was in his biology class at Rock Valley College when he was pulled out and told that his father and cousin had been shot. When Alex went back to school he could not concentrate well, and ended up failing to obtain a degree in business administration. He was present at almost all of Stewart's court hearings. He said he wanted the case done and over with, and that he was planning to leave Rockford after the execution to leave his bad memories behind. Thelma Crawford, Willie's mother, said Stewart deserved to die.

Faith Crocker, one of Stewart's 11 siblings, told the board about Stewart's abusive upbringing. "Daddy's the one that should be in that electric chair," she said. "That's the bottom line." Crocker wept openly even before the hearing as she blamed their abusive father since he "hated Ray with a passion."

Winnebago County State's Attorney Paul Logli said Stewart did not deserve to live given the gravity of his crimes. "He terrorized the entire community," he said. "I don't think it's an overstatement to say he terrorized a generation of people in our community." Bob Hurley, a former Beloit police officer who worked on the case, said the Wisconsin murders were among the most brutal he had seen.

"This man deserves the death sentence," said Laura Davis, the sister of Kevin Kaiser. "He's a coldblooded murderer, and in my heart I hate his guts. Kaiser's twin sister, told the board she could not use the word "man" when describing the killer "because Raymond Lee Stewart in our opinion is no man. An animal? Yes. A murderer? Definitely."

David Koski, the prosecutor in one of Stewart's murder trials, said "the whole community was electrified by the knowledge or the suspicion that there was a psychopathic killer who was killing people in cold blood and in daylight."

The board rejected Stewart's clemency petition. After hearing of the decision, Constance Mitchell said she would pray for Stewart's soul. Shortly before his execution, Stewart read from the Bible and prayed with Cardinal Bernardin, who himself was terminally ill with pancreatic cancer and had about a year left to live. Although he was not Catholic, Stewart said he still wanted to pray with him. Bernardin gave Stewart a card bearing the 23rd Psalm, which recites "Yea though I walk through the valley of the shadow of death I will fear no evil for thou art with me." Stewart said he was tearful during his meeting with Bernardin. "I am not afraid," Stewart later said in a telephone interview at 8 p.m. Tuesday. "I have already seen myself on the gurney. I have seen myself with needles stuck in my arm. I have seen that all in my mind. So when I go, I will have a peaceful smile on my face. He took my hands. He talked about how he was dying, too, only he was going to die one way and I was going to die another. He said that although the both of us was going to die in separate situations, we would wind up being in the same place."

"I asked whether he; was sorry for what he had done, and he indicated that he was, so I blessed him," Bernardin recounted. "I said, 'We both face premature death. This is the reason for both of us to put our lives in the hands of God.'" Stewart had final visits from a brother, a sister, and his teenage daughter.

Stewart was executed by lethal injection at Stateville Correctional Center on September 18, 1996. His last meal consisted of fried perch, potato salad, coleslaw, canned peaches, and fruit juice. Stewart's last words were "Hello to everyone. May you all have peace because of this. May my victims' families have peace."

== See also ==
- Capital punishment in Illinois
- List of people executed in Illinois
- List of people executed in the United States in 1996
