= Martin Durkin =

Martin Durkin may refer to:

- Martin Patrick Durkin (1894–1955), American politician
- Martin Durkin (director), British television producer
- Martin James Durkin (1901–1981), American criminal
