= Charles Walker (murderer) =

American murderer (1940–1990)

- Born: Charles Thomas Walker; April 28, 1940; Fayetteville, Illinois, U.S.
- Died: September 12, 1990 (aged 50); Stateville Correctional Center, Crest Hill, Illinois, U.S.
- Cause of death: Execution by lethal injection
- Convictions: Murder (2 counts); Attempted murder Armed robbery Burglary 2 (counts)
- Penalty: Death (October 13, 1983)

Details
- Victims: Kevin Paule, 21; Sharon Winker, 25
- Date: June 18, 1983
- Imprisoned at: Menard Correctional Center

Charles Thomas Walker (April 28, 1940 – September 12, 1990) was an American convicted murderer who was executed in 1990 by the state of Illinois for the June 1983 murders of Kevin Paule, 21, and his fiancée Sharon Winker, 25, of Mascoutah. Looking for beer money, Walker robbed them of $40 and shot them to death while the couple fished in a St. Clair County creek. He was executed by lethal injection at Stateville Correctional Center at the age of 50, becoming the first person to be executed in Illinois since 1962. The execution was considered botched because the lethal injection machine was unable to make the drugs go through the kinked lines.

== Early life ==
Walker was born on April 28, 1940, in Fayetteville, Illinois, to Jess and Lucille Walker, who divorced while Charles was still young. Both his father and stepfather were alcoholics. At age 8, Walker got drunk on moonshine after his father gave him some to try. By age 12, his stepfather was taking him out to drink in local taverns. At age 14, Walker started committing crimes and began carrying out minor offenses and burglaries. A year later, he was charged with contributing to the delinquency of a minor after he was caught buying beer for his younger cousin.

During his sophomore year, Walker dropped out of high school, left home, and headed to Florida. He returned to Illinois six months later and continued his life of crime, committing multiple burglaries. At age 17, Walker was convicted of burglary and was sent to Menard Correctional Center for six and a half years. Less than a year after his release, Walker broke into a tavern and stole money and alcohol. He was sent back to Menard for an additional four years. In 1961, Walker's father was fatally shot in O'Fallon. The man convicted of the killing served two years in jail before being released.

In 1969, after being out of prison for two months, Walker went out on a drinking spree. In a drunken rage, Walker got into a shootout with Whiteside County police and lost his right eye after being shot in the face during the exchange of gunfire. Walker was charged with attempted murder and was sent to prison for six years. After his release, he committed an armed robbery at a gas station and was sentenced to prison for four years. During his time out of prison, Walker married a woman called Stella, with whom he had frequent fights. She would eventually divorce him due to his excessive drinking.

== Murders ==
On June 18, 1983, Walker woke up and drank beer and vodka before spending the day at Silver Creek fishing. At the creek, located just outside Mascoutah in St. Clair County, Walker met 21-year-old Kevin Paule and his fiancée, 25-year-old Sharon Winker. After chatting with them for a while, Walker decided he would rob them and took out a .25-caliber pistol. After taking Paule's wallet, he tied them to a tree and bound their hands with tape. Paule then told Walker he would not get away with the crime because he knew who he was. Fearing they would go to the police, Walker decided to kill both of them. He fatally shot Paule in his right temple and then killed Winker with a fatal shot to the back of the head. Walker took Paule's wallet, which contained $40, and fled the area.

== Aftermath ==
After the murders, Walker drove to the Runway Lounge bar near Scott Air Force Base and drank beer. He chatted with the owner for several hours until it was after midnight. Walker then stood up, took out his gun, and robbed the bar after everyone had left. As Walker fled with the stolen money, the owner chased after him, jumped into a car, and rammed Walker's vehicle. Walker opened fire and hit the other vehicle's windshield but missed hitting the owner. Following the crash, smoke covered the area, and Walker escaped.

When police arrived and searched the vehicle, they found multiple items that were confirmed to belong to Paule and Winker. In addition, the murder weapon was also recovered. Walker fled to his half-sister's house and asked her for a lift to a St. Louis bus station. He then bought a bus ticket to Tacoma, Washington, where his ex-wife lived. He later hitchhiked to Walden, Colorado and contacted a former girlfriend. The former girlfriend turned him in by contacting the Jackson County Sheriff's Department. Officers arrested Walker, who waived extradition proceedings and was picked up by St. Clair County police on July 16.

== Trial ==
On July 27, 1983, Walker pleaded guilty to two counts of murder. He chose to have his case decided by a jury trial instead of a judge. The jury, consisting of six men and six women, reached a guilty verdict in just over an hour. On October 13, 1983, Walker was sentenced to death. In 1987, he decided to forgo further appeals of his sentence. In 1988, the Supreme Court of Illinois deemed Walker mentally competent to waive further legal appeals.

While on death row, Walker communicated with convicted serial killer John Wayne Gacy. In an interview, Walker explained how he and Gacy would only talk about generalities such as ball scores and never about Walker's desire to be executed.

== Execution ==
On September 12, 1990, Walker was executed by lethal injection at Stateville Correctional Center. He was the first person to be executed in Illinois in over twenty-eight years. His last meal consisted of fried wild rabbit, biscuits, and blackberry pie. Walker's execution was prolonged due to a kink in the plastic tubing, which stopped the flow of chemicals into his body.

== See also ==
- Capital punishment in Illinois
- Capital punishment in the United States
- List of homicides in Illinois
- List of people executed in Illinois
- List of people executed in the United States in 1990

Executions carried out in Illinois
| Preceded by James Dukes August 24, 1962 | Charles Walker; September 12, 1990 | Succeeded by John Wayne Gacy May 10, 1994 |
Executions carried out in the United States
| Preceded by Charles Coleman – Oklahoma September 10, 1990 | Charles Walker – Illinois; September 12, 1990 | Succeeded by James Hamblen – Florida September 21, 1990 |
