= List of people executed in Illinois =

This is a list of people executed in Illinois. A total of twelve people convicted of murder have been executed by the state of Illinois since 1977. All were executed by lethal injection. Two other men condemned in Illinois, Alton Coleman and Murray Hooper, were executed in Ohio and Arizona, respectively. However, Hooper's death sentences in Illinois were commuted to life in prison in 2003 and his murder convictions were vacated in 2013 due to discrimination in the selection of his jury prior to his execution in Arizona.

Capital punishment in Illinois was abolished in 2011.

== List of people executed in Illinois ==
No.	Name	Race	Age	Sex	Date of execution	County	Method	Victim(s)	Governor
1	Charles Walker	White	50	M	September 12, 1990	St. Clair	Lethal injection	Kevin Paule and Sharon Winker	James R. Thompson
2	John Wayne Gacy	White	52	M	May 10, 1994	Cook	Lethal injection	33 murder victims (Note: See: List of Victims of John Wayne Gacy)	James Edgar
3	James P. Free Jr.	White	41	M	March 22, 1995	DuPage	Lethal injection	Bonnie Serpico	James Edgar
4	Hernando Williams	Black	40	M	March 22, 1995	Cook	Lethal injection	Linda Goldstone	James Edgar
5	Girvies Davis	Black	37	M	May 17, 1995	St. Clair	Lethal injection	4 murder victims (Note: The 4 victims were: Charles Biebel, John Oertel, Frank Cash, and Esther Sepmeyer.)	James Edgar
6	Charles Albanese	White	58	M	September 20, 1995	McHenry	Lethal injection	Michael Albanese, Marion Mueller, and Mary Lambert	James Edgar
7	George Del Vecchio	White	47	M	November 22, 1995	Cook	Lethal injection	Tony Conzoneri	James Edgar
8	Raymond Lee Stewart	Black	44	M	September 18, 1996	Winnebago	Lethal injection	6 murder victims (Note: the 6 victims were: Willie Fredd, Albert Pearson, Kevin Kaiser, Kenny Faust, Richard Boeck, and Donald Rains, the latter 2 victims were killed in Wisconsin.)	James Edgar
9	Walter Stewart	Black	42	M	November 19, 1997	Cook	Lethal injection	Thomas Paviopoulos and Dinalo Rodica	James Edgar
10	Durlyn Eddmonds	Black	42	M	November 19, 1997	Cook	Lethal injection	Richard Lee Miller	James Edgar
11	Lloyd Wayne Hampton	White	44	M	January 21, 1998 (Note: This was the last execution held at the Stateville Correctional Center in Crest Hill.)	Madison	Lethal injection	Roy Pendleton	James Edgar
12	Andrew Kokoraleis	White	35	M	March 17, 1999 (Note: This was the first and only execution held at the Tamms Correctional Center in Tamms.)	Cook	Lethal injection	Lorraine Ann Borowski	George Ryan

== Demographics ==
Race
White	7	58%
Black	5	42%
Age
30–39	2	17%
40–49	7	58%
50–59	3	25%
Sex
Male	12	100%
Date of execution
1977–1979	0	0%
1980–1989	0	0%
1990–1999	12	100%
2000–2009	0	0%
2010–2019	0	0%
Method
Lethal injection	12	100%
Governor (Party)
Jim Thompson (R)	1	8%
Jim Edgar (R)	10	84%
George Ryan (R)	1	8%
Rod Blagojevich (D)	0	0%
Pat Quinn (D)	0	0%
Total	12	100%

== Abolition of death penalty ==
Governor Pat Quinn signed legislation on March 9, 2011, to abolish the death penalty in Illinois. All fifteen death row inmates in the state had their sentences commuted to life imprisonment without parole.

== See also ==
- Capital punishment in Illinois
- Capital punishment in the United States
