= Andre Jones and Freddie Tiller =

American spree killers

Andre Jones
- Born: Andre Vernell Jones; July 22, 1956 (age 70); East St. Louis, Illinois, U.S.
- Status: Incarcerated
- Convictions: Murder (3 counts); Armed robbery
- Penalty: Death; commuted to life imprisonment

Details
- Victims: 5–8
- Span of crimes: 1978 – 1979 (possibly committed a triple murder in 1971)
- Country: United States
- State: Illinois
- Date apprehended: May 4, 1979
- Imprisoned at: Menard Correctional Center

Freddie Tiller
- Born: Freddie Clyde Tiller Jr. August 17, 1957 (age 69); Missouri, U.S.
- Status: Released
- Convictions: Murder (2 counts); Armed robbery Burglary
- Penalty: Death; commuted to life imprisonment; further commuted to 80 years imprisonment

Details
- Victims: 3 (2 as an accomplice)
- Date: April 30, 1979
- Country: United States
- State: Illinois
- Date apprehended: May 4, 1979

Andre Vernell Jones (born July 22, 1956) and Freddie Clyde Tiller Jr. (born August 17, 1957) are American spree killers who killed three people in East St. Louis, Illinois in 1979. Jones is also a serial killer, committing at least two additional murders.

Jones and Tiller committed their crimes at the same time and in the same region as Girvies Davis and Richard Holman. Consequently, all four men received extensive local media coverage.

== Early life ==
Prior to the murders, Jones had a lengthy criminal history, starting with purse-snatching when he was 12 years old. His prior convictions included theft, shoplifting, armed robberies and attempted murder. At the time of the 1979 murder, Jones was on parole after serving 4 years and three months of a 4 to 12-year sentence for armed robbery.

== Murders and arrest ==
In 1980, Jones confessed to committing a triple murder in 1971, when he was 14 years old. The alleged victims were Arthur Lee Walson, 21, and brothers Frank Slaughter, 23, and Jack Slaughter, 21, and had been shot and stabbed. Jones said he killed the men for failing to pay him money for drugs that he gave them. An officer said he didn't report the confession since he thought Jones was too young to have committed the murders on his own. Jones refused to say if he had an accomplice in the alleged murders.

In November 1978, Jones murdered Michael Wallace, 67, and Dora Wallace, 55, in their home. He decapitated Michael and stabbed Dora to death, before torching their house. Jones confessed to the murders after his arrest, but was never tried for them.

On April 30, 1979, Jones, along with Tiller, killed three people. The first victim was 63-year-old Richard Stoltz. Stoltz, a World War II veteran, was in the back of a pickup truck, stacking bricks. Tiller said he was going to rob Stoltz and asked Jones for a gun. After Jones gave him a gun, Tiller approached Stoltz and told him he was being robbed. When Stoltz tried to raise his hands in surrender, Tiller shot him in the left eye, killing him. He then took Stoltz's wallet, keys, and watch. Tiller's cousin, Lori Elem, who was also Jones's girlfriend, witnessed the robbery-slaying and would later testify at their trials.

Afterwards, Jones told Tiller, "Man, you shot the shit out of that honky," to which he replied, "I mean business. He wouldn't up the cash." Jones and Tiller then decided to rob a dry cleaning store. Jones held the proprietor, 23-year-old Samuel Nersesian, at gunpoint while Tiller searched the store for valuables. What happened next is disputed. According to Jones, he immediately murdered Nersesian, shooting him once in the head, then shooting him a second time after he fell to the floor, while Tiller was present. According to Tiller, Nersesian was alive until the end of the robbery. Before the two men could leave, however, 21-year-old mailwoman Debra Brown entered the store. Tiller left the building after twice telling Jones not to hurt Brown.

However, after Tiller left, Jones hid behind the door and ambushed Brown when she entered. He grabbed her around the neck, pushed her into the business's kitchen, and shot her twice, once in the chest and once in the mouth. Jones then joined Tiller outside and the two left the scene. They were both arrested on May 4, 1979.

== Trial and incarceration ==
Jones and Tiller were indicted for three counts of murder. On August 23, 1979, Jones pleaded guilty to three counts of murder. He was sentenced to death.

Prior to Tiller's trial, he filed a motion to have the murder charge relating to Stoltz's death severed since it was a separate offense. The motion was granted, and prosecutors ultimately never tried him in that case since he was already facing possible execution. At his trial, Tiller said he was drunk and on drugs at the time and had only limited memory of the events. He said he did not remember having a gun and denied any knowledge that any robberies or murders would take place. Tiller claimed that he only went along with Jones since he was afraid of him. However, Lori Elem testified that she heard Tiller plan the robbery with Jones, then saw him shoot and kill Richard Stoltz.

In September 1979, Tiller was convicted of two counts of murder and two counts of armed robbery and sentenced to death. On appeal, his death sentences and one of his robbery convictions were overturned. The Supreme Court of Illinois ordered for Tiller to be given a sentence other than death, saying it was not proven that he intended for Nersesian or Brown to die. However, they upheld his murder convictions on the grounds that Tiller knew that Jones might hurt them and did nothing to stop that from happening.

Tiller was resentenced to life in prison without parole, but was granted another sentencing hearing after one of the aggravating factors used against him when he was initially sentenced was dismissed. At Tiller's resentencing hearing, the prosecution asked for either another life term or a 160-year sentence. Tiller's public defender asked for the minimum sentence of 20 years, saying Tiller had a mental disorder, was borderline intellectually disabled, and suffered from alcoholism. The judge resentenced him to two consecutive 40-year terms for each murder, saying he was unsure whether Tiller's role in the murders met the qualifications for a life sentence or an extended term of 40 to 80 years in a prison (at the time, murder without aggravating circumstances carried a sentence of 20 to 40 years in prison in Illinois). He was released from prison on May 3, 2019, but sent back for parole violations. Tiller was released once more in 2022.

On January 11, 2003, Jones's sentence was commuted to life in prison without parole after Governor George Ryan granted blanket clemency to all 167 people on death row in Illinois over his growing concerns over capital punishment. One of Stoltz's four daughters was outraged over Jones's commutation, saying she hoped "that when Ryan gets to Hell that he and Andre Jones have a real good time together."

== See also ==
- List of serial killers in the United States
