= Jesse Sumner (serial killer) =

American serial killer (1937–2005)

- Born: Jesse Donald Sumner; January 9, 1937; McLean, Illinois, U.S.
- Died: December 4, 2005 (aged 68); Stateville Correctional Center, Crest Hill, Illinois, U.S.
- Convictions: Murder; Voluntary manslaughter Aggravated battery Assault; Robbery; Attempted murder Incest
- Penalty: 35-to-75 years imprisonment; commuted to 10-to-15 years (1964); 100-to-200 years imprisonment x2 (Huwe-Schneider); 50-to-100 years imprisonment (Burchie)

Details
- Victims: 4
- Span of crimes: 1963–1973
- Country: United States
- State: Illinois
- Date apprehended: July 19, 1973

Jesse Donald Sumner (January 9, 1937 – December 4, 2005) was an American serial killer and repeat prison escapee who murdered three young women in the vicinity of the Illinois State University from 1972 to 1973, following his parole for the 1963 murder of his accomplice in a robbery. For the latter crimes, he was given multiple 50-to-200 year sentences, which he served until his death in 2005.

== Crimes and murder of Herschel Williams ==
In the early 1960s, Sumner and his alleged accomplice, 40-year-old Herschel Williams Jr., participated in several robberies and hold-ups of various establishments, most notable of which were the Farmers State Bank in Heyworth and a credit union in Bloomington. The two supposedly had a falling out, which Sumner claimed was because Williams was threatening his wife and children.

On March 25, 1963, Williams visited Sumner at his barber shop in Danville, asking him to accompany him on another robbery. After refusing and having an argument about it, he then asked for a haircut. Sumner accepted, but at one point while he was cutting Williams' hair, he slashed his throat with the razor. After cleaning up the crime scene, he stuffed the body in a 55-gallon barrel and encased it in concrete, then buried it in a landfill in Bloomington. While it initially remained undiscovered, Sumner would later be arrested and convicted for robbing the credit union and sentenced to a 2-to-5 year sentence.

After finally locating the barrels on June 1, 1964, local authorities eventually charged Sumner with Williams' murder. While being escorted out of the jail in Springfield, he attempted to escape but was caught after mere minutes.

=== Prosecution and sentence ===
While Sumner denied having anything to do with the murder, the prosecution provided a plethora of evidence that contradicted his claims. Chief among them was that he had bought two barrels and that the body was later found in one of them; that the body was positively identified as Williams' by his wife, who recognized a wallet found on it; and the testimony of two inmates at the Pontiac Correctional Center, Larry F. Myers and John Curtis, who claimed that Sumner had repeatedly told them that he had killed Williams. In response, Sumner's attorney accused Myers and Curtis of providing contradicting statements as to when they started believing Sumner's claims and that they had been offered lax treatment by prison guards in exchange for testifying against his client.

In the end, a circuit court judge found Sumner to be guilty of the murder charge. Three months later, at his sentencing hearing, Sumner was given a sentence of 35-to-75 years imprisonment.

== Parole and new murders ==
=== Parole and supervision ===
Sumner appealed his conviction after his incarceration, and in 1969, the Supreme Court of Illinois ruled in favor of him and overturned the conviction. Unwilling to proceed with a new trial, he pleaded guilty to the lesser charge of voluntary manslaughter, with his sentence being reduced to 10-to-15 years. However, due to his good behavior in prison, he was eligible for parole after serving 6.5 years.

In January 1972, Sumner was finally paroled, on the condition that he be closely monitored. By the end of the month, he had found employment and was considered a helpful worker by his employer, in addition to enrolling as a junior at the Illinois State University. From February to July of that year, his state parole officer, Robert Drucker, stated that Sumner regularly reported all the necessary activities he had to and was seemingly forthcoming with his issues, including that he had gone on a vacation to Casper, Wyoming and planned to visit Decatur.

On the other hand, federal parole officers were slightly more concerned with how he was handled, as the head of the Federal Parole Office in the Southern District of Illinois, Gilbert Scheller, noted that two months was not long enough for Drucker to deem Sumner as "rehabilitated". Despite this, Jack Watters, the federal parole officer assigned to Sumner, also said that he had no major issues with him and that Sumner wrote reports about his activities on a regular basis.

=== Murders ===
Unbeknownst to his parole officers, Sumner had begun to predate on students that attended the Illinois State University. First among them as 19-year-old Corene Marie Burchie, who disappeared on April 19, 1972. Her body was found in a shallow grave near Maroa on the following day, having apparently been strangled to death.

On December 22, 20-year-old Rae Ann Schneider, a drive-in waitress working the night shift at a Steak 'n Shake in Normal, disappeared shortly after leaving her workplace. This was soon followed by the disappearance of another student, 18-year-old Dawn Marie Huwe, who vanished near a bus stop near the ISU campus on May 28, 1973. At the time, it was unclear what exactly had happened to the two women, as there were no clues as to their whereabouts.

== Arrest and prosecution ==
On July 19, Sumner was arrested on a parole violation charge after his wife reported that he had beaten her to such an extent that required her to be hospitalized. During his incarceration, he was interrogated by the McLean County Sheriff John W. King in relation to the recent disappearances, and was asked to undergo a polygraph test. His inconsistent and evasive answers eventually led authorities to believe he might be involved in the disappearance of Huwe, and possibly the other two women as well. However, Sumner was not charged immediately, as investigators decided to look into the matter a bit more - in the meantime, he was charged with an unrelated count of aggravated incest stemming from the sexual abuse of his daughter.

On August 4, just two days after his incest charge, Sumner contacted the sheriffs and offered to lead them to where he had buried the bodies of Schneider and Huwe. After initially failing to locate them, Sumner eventually led them to the burial sites - the first being under his garage at the family home in Stanford, and the other being a ditch west of Danvers. Both women's remains showed signs of blunt force trauma, and were positively identified as belonging to Schneider and Huwe through their dental records. As a result, King soon signed two complaints charging Sumner with several counts of murder, intent to commit murder and causing grievous bodily harm for both killings. Just a day later, he was arraigned on similar charges for the murder of Burchie.

== Incarceration and escape attempts ==
While awaiting trial on the murder charges, Sumner attempted to escape by sawing through the bars of his cell, but was caught before he could make any substantial dents on it. Fearing that he might attempt it again, he was then temporarily moved to the more secure Cook County Jail in Chicago. On the way there, he tried to steal a deputy's pistol, but was again thwarted. During this incarceration in Chicago, his public defender Marvin Gaselle requested a competency hearing for Sumner, which was accepted, but the results were never revealed to the public.

A few weeks later, a jury indicted Sumner for the murders of Huwe and Schneider. During his pre-trial hearings, he pleaded not guilty on all counts. On September 19, Sumner and two other inmates at the McLean County Jail, Charles E. Nester and Michael R. Clark, attempted to escape by digging a hole through the jail's west wall, but were stopped by the jail guards.

=== Trial ===
During another hearing, Gaselle filed a motion for the charges against his client to be dismissed, citing comments from Sheriff King that Huwe and Schneider may have been killed in Tazewell County, not McLean County - as per Illinois law at the time, this necessitated that he be moved to the respective county the crimes were committed in. This motion was granted, in addition to a continuance in relation to the remaining charges, as Gaselle could not attend trial at the designated date and would thus be unprepared in building a defense for his client. On November 14, the Circuit Court in Tazewell County indicted Sumner for the murders of Huwe and Schneider.

While awaiting trial at the Tazewell County Jail, Sumner attempted to escape yet again, this time by sawing through his cell door with a sharpened piece of metal. While he failed to get past the lockup area, he managed to cut deputy sheriff Ronald Parker several times on the throat, for which Parker had to be treated at a hospital. As a result of this, Sumner was lodged in a maximum-security cell, had his visitor privileges suspended and was additionally charged with attempted murder, aggravated battery, criminal damage to property and attempted escape.

When his trial finally began in September 1974, Sumner unexpectedly pleaded guilty to killing Huwe and Schneider. As a result, he would receive two consecutive 100-to-200 years terms, on top of a 50-to-100 year sentence he would later be given for the murder of Burchie.

=== Prison assault ===
On February 10, 1981, while serving his sentences at the Menard Correctional Center in Chester, Sumner was walking on a sidewalk in the central area when he was suddenly ambushed by another inmate, triple murderer Michael Drabing, who then stabbed him with a shank. Sumner's injuries required 17 stitches and he was hospitalized for a week, but would later fully recover from the attack.

While a full explanation behind the attack was never given, Drabing claimed that it was in self-defense - he admitted to being the instigator, but claimed that Sumner was in possession of the shank. His claims were not believed, and Drabing was given an additional 30-year sentence for attempted murder and armed violence, to be served concurrently with his already existing sentences.

=== Parole hearing and final escape attempt ===
In 1983, Sumner attended a parole hearing, in which he notably refused to testify and requested that the press be barred from attending, with the latter request being denied. Relatives of his victims urged that his applications for parole be denied, as most of them believed that he could not be rehabilitated and would still pose a danger if he was let out.

In 1988, Sumner was scheduled to go to a doctor's office in Joliet to be fitted with a hearing aid. On the way, he used a homemade pistol to keep the two guards and an office employee hostage before fleeing to southern Kendall County, where he released one of the officers and the employee. He then accosted a random passer-by and held him as a hostage until he reached Hinckley, where he released him as well.

Somewhere along the way, he stole a red 1979 Chevrolet truck and started driving towards Sycamore, where he was arrested by local sheriffs. The sole remaining hostage managed to jump out of his truck, suffering minor injuries in the process. Family members of his victims were horrified after hearing about the escape, and later criticized about how lax the security handling the transport was.

== Death ==
For the rest of his life, Sumner remained incarcerated at the Stateville Correctional Center in Crest Hill, until he died from an undisclosed illness on December 4, 2005. His death came as a surprise to some of his victims' and the investigators' relatives, who believed that he had died years prior.

== See also ==
- List of serial killers in the United States
