= Jesse Sumner =

Jesse Sumner may refer to:

- Jesse Sumner (politician), Alaska politician
- Jesse Sumner (serial killer), American serial killer

== See also ==
- Jessie Sumner, U.S. representative from Illinois
