= Charles Albanese =

Executed American serial killer (1937–1995)

- Born: Charles Michael Albanese; June 13, 1937; Chicago, Illinois, U.S.
- Died: September 20, 1995 (aged 58); Stateville Correctional Center, Crest Hill, Illinois, U.S.
- Cause of death: Execution by lethal injection
- Other name: Charles Romaine
- Motive: Financial gain
- Convictions: Murder (3 counts); Attempted murder; Armed robbery; Theft (2 counts)
- Penalty: Death

Details
- Victims: 3
- Span of crimes: 1980–1981
- Country: United States
- State: Illinois
- Date apprehended: November 18, 1981

Charles Michael Albanese (June 13, 1937 – September 20, 1995) was an American serial killer who poisoned three relatives with arsenic in McHenry, Illinois, from 1980 to 1981, in order to obtain their inheritance, bank funds, real estate, life insurance payouts and pension proceeds. He was sentenced to death in two separate trials and ultimately executed in 1995.

== Early life ==
Charles Michael Albanese was born on June 13, 1937, in Chicago, Illinois. He was the elder son of entrepreneur Michael Albanese Sr. and his wife Clara (née Kolasinski). Little is known of his childhood, but acquaintances would recall that Albanese was a "spoiled brat who always wanted to be a big shot", an ambitious young man who wanted to earn as much money doing as little work as possible. During the mid-1960s, he worked as a car salesman for Norwood Motors Inc., based out of Morton Grove.

His first known crime occurred on February 1, 1965, when Albanese and an unidentified accomplice, posing as detectives, broke into the home of 61-year-old CTA bus driver Emmett Farrell and stole $160 from him. About a week later, using information provided by a neighbor who had written down his car's license plate, Albanese was arrested and positively identified by the Farrells as one of the burglars. Not long after, he was indicted by a grand jury for armed robbery and several counts of auto theft, the latter under the alias "Charles Romaine". He was convicted and sentenced to five years of probation. Following his conviction, his first wife divorced him after six years of marriage and moved away with their three daughters to live in Wisconsin.

At some later point, he married his second wife, but not much is known of their relationship. While still legally married to his second wife, Albanese went on to marry Virginia Mueller in Las Vegas in 1972, during the Labor Day Weekend. The divorce with the latter woman was finalized the next year. His second ex-wife would file two more complaints against him in the following years: one in McHenry County for not paying $1,475 of child support in 1977, and another for non-support of a petition filed in Chicago in 1980. Despite his legal troubles, Albanese was seemingly happily married, and due to his position as a president at the Allied Die Casting company (which was owned by his father), he earned an annual salary of $60,000. In 1978, Albanese and his family moved to Spring Grove, where he earned a reputation amongst his neighbors as a man who liked to flaunt his wealth and influence. It was estimated that he owned several expensive cars, including a Cadillac, and always took his wife and two daughters on annual vacations to either Marco Island in Florida or Jamaica.

== Murders ==
In mid-1980, Charles began to pay frequent visits to the Leisure Village retirement community in Fox Lake, where his wife's mother, 69-year-old Marion Mueller, lived with her own mother, 89-year-old Mary Lambert. When doing so, he would often bring little gifts, varying from jewelry and trinkets, and would often dine with them whenever he could. During these visits, he gradually convinced Lambert to transfer her financial assets to her daughter, completely bypassing her other daughter and son. Then, unbeknownst to anyone from his family, he contacted the operator of a metal plating company in Elkhorn, Wisconsin, to whom he sometimes sold scrap zinc, ostensibly to ask what would be the most efficient method to get rid of some "pests" in his home. On the man's recommendation, Albanese was supplied with arsenic and instructed how to use it, and over the next few months, he administered small doses of the poison in Mueller's food.

The first death came about on August 6, 1980, when Mueller began to suffer from diarrhea and violent vomiting, for which she was rushed to the McHenry Hospital, where she died on the same day. Her cause of death was listed as a heart attack. Only twelve days later, Lambert was taken by a similar illness and rushed to the St. Therese Hospital in Waukegan, where she died from what was deemed "natural causes". The sudden death of the two women sparked fears in the locals, as well as rumors that the village's food and water supply had been contaminated. In response, the Lake County Health Department launched a full-scale investigation in both the sewage system and the restaurants, but all tests returned negative. Due to the lack of any suspicious substances or activity, the investigation was concluded and life slowly returned to normal. Owing to their deaths, Mueller and Lambert's estates, which amounted to around $150,000, were transferred to Albanese's wife Virginia.

Not long after the tragedy, Albanese attended a meeting with his father on September 4, 1980, during which an argument broke out between the two, with Michael Sr. saying that he no longer wanted him in the company. A few days later, the elder Albanese changed his stance and simply demoted him to treasurer. In what appeared to be an act of gratitude, Albanese began bringing home-made cookies to his father at work, as well as snacks for his younger brother. Just four days after he began doing so, Michael Jr. had to be hospitalized due to severe vomiting and nausea. In the following months, both Michael Sr. and Michael Jr. were hospitalized on several occasions due to violent illnesses, with the former succumbing to his ailments on May 16, 1981, aged 69. With the death of his father, Albanese inherited his $267,373 estate as well as tighter control over the family business.

== Investigation and arrest ==
While conducting the autopsy on Michael Sr.'s corpse, the McHenry County Coroner, Alvin Querhammer, noticed traces of arsenic in the man's serum. He then contacted the coroner for Lake County, Robert H. Babcox, who had investigated Mueller and Lambert's death the previous year, after realizing that they also had connections to the Albanese family. With a task force spread across the two counties, each coroner was granted permission from Virginia Albanese to have her relatives' bodies exhumed and tested, with both autopsies revealing a large amount of arsenic in them.

After this discovery, the McHenry Police Chief, George Pasenelli, ordered a background check on all of the Albanese family members, which included Charles. As they delved deeper into his history, they uncovered his criminal record, possible motives for committing the crimes and the fact that he had been sold arsenic by the metal plating company operator. In the process, the task force learned through a travel agent that Albanese had planned another holiday trip to Jamaica for Thanksgiving, on which he would be accompanied by his wife and mother, Clara. Fearing that Albanese would target his mother due to her wealth amounting to $500,000, the investigators moved in and arrested him at his office in McHenry on November 18, 1981. He was subsequently charged with all three murders, the attempted murder of his brother and stealing from the company stock.

== Trials, imprisonment and execution ==
As two of the three murders were in a different jurisdiction, it was decided that Albanese would be charged in two separate trials: one in Lake County for the murders of Lambert, his father and the attempted murder of his brother, and another in McHenry County for the murder of Mueller. The first would be the Lake County trial, in which he pleaded innocent on all charges. Due to the pre-trial publicity surrounding the case, the trial venue was moved to Bloomington, and was scheduled for May 1982. After deliberation for just over seven hours, the jury found Albanese guilty on all counts on May 18. The prosecution sought a death sentence, saying that despite his lack of a serious criminal history, he deserved to die since he had shown no remorse. Two days later, Albanese was sentenced to die in the electric chair. As his sentence was read out by the judge, he showed no emotion and appeared tired.

That same October, Albanese was transferred to Lake County to stand trial in Lambert's murder. In spite of his claims that either his brother or a random killer was actually responsible for all the killings, as well as his attorney's unsuccessful motion to dismiss the charges due to circumstantial evidence, Albanese was convicted of Mueller's murder on October 26. Days later, he was again sentenced to death. Albanese also received a 60-year sentence for the attempted murder of his brother and 5 years for two theft counts.

In the following years, Albanese attempted to appeal his sentences and have his convictions overturned, but his appeals were unsuccessful. On September 20, 1995, he was executed via lethal injection at the Stateville Correctional Center, continuing to protest his innocence and accusing the authorities of "covering up the facts" of the case. For his last meal he requested prime rib, baked potato, garlic bread, coffee, Coca-Cola and pistachio ice cream. Albanese made no final statement, but said "Thank you" to the warden before he was put to death.

== See also ==
- List of homicides in Illinois
- List of people executed by lethal injection
- List of people executed in Illinois
- List of people executed in the United States in 1995
- List of serial killers in the United States

Executions carried out in Illinois
Preceded by Girvies Davis May 17, 1995	Charles Albanese; September 20, 1995	Succeeded by George Del Vecchio November 22, 1995
Executions carried out in the United States
Preceded by Carl Johnson Jr. – Texas September 19, 1995	Charles Albanese – Illinois; September 20, 1995	Succeeded by Phillip Ingle – North Carolina September 22, 1995
