= Stateville Correctional Center =

Minimum security prison near Joliet, Illinois, U.S.

Coordinates: 41°34′43″N 88°05′40″W

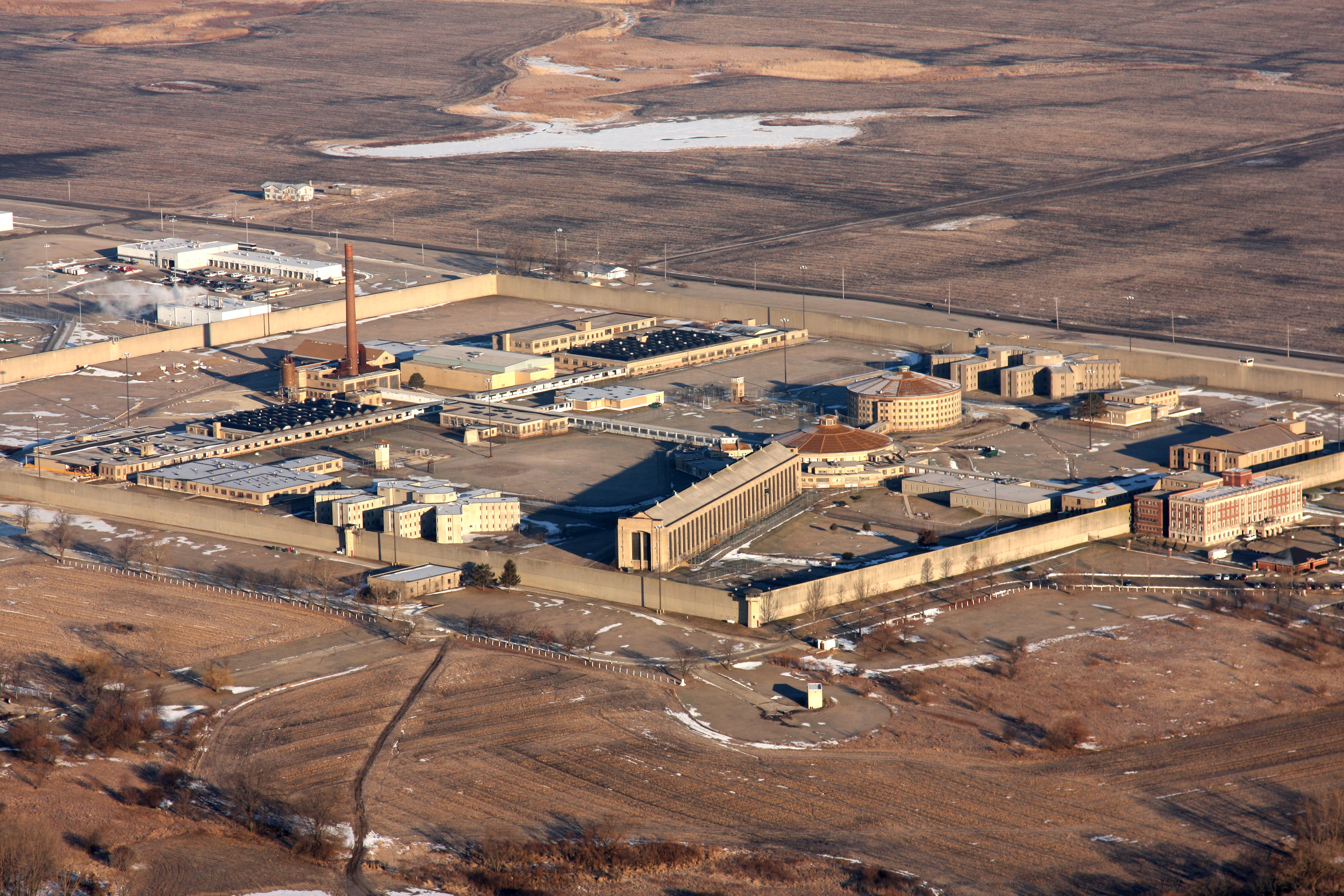
- Interactive map of Stateville Correctional Center
- Location: 16830 Route 53 Crest Hill, Illinois, U.S.
- Status: closed (main facility), open (minimum security unit, Northern Reception and Classification Center)
- Capacity: 4,134
- Opened: 1925
- Managed by: Illinois Department of Corrections

Stateville Correctional Center (SCC) is a minimum security (formerly maximum security) state prison for men in Crest Hill, Illinois, United States, near Chicago. It is part of the Illinois Department of Corrections.

== History ==
The old and smaller Joliet Correctional Center, opened in 1858 on a site in Joliet 2.5 miles (4.0 km) to the south-southeast, was being considered for closure. Construction commenced on the new Stateville facility in 1917, in what was then an unincorporated area of Lockport Township, (Note: Stateville's location became part of Crest Hill, Illinois, when that city was incorporated in 1960) opening in 1925 with capacity to accommodate 1,506 inmates. While the Stateville Correctional Center was meant to lead to the swift closure of Joliet, both prisons operated simultaneously for the rest of the 20th century.

Parts of the prison were designed according to the panopticon concept proposed by the British philosopher and prison reformer, Jeremy Bentham. Stateville's "F-House" cellhouse, commonly known as a "roundhouse", has a panopticon layout which features an armed tower in the center of an open area surrounded by several tiers of cells. F-House was the only remaining "roundhouse" still in use in the United States in the 1990s. The roundhouse was closed in late 2016 but the structure will remain standing due to its historical significance. A duplicate of the prison, the Presidio Modelo, opened in Cuba in 1936, but has since been abandoned.

In 2009, a 40-year-old man from Chicago, Richard Conner, murdered a 37-year-old Will County man named Jameson Leezer, who had originated from Lisle and Bolingbrook. Both were inmates placed in the same solitary confinement cell together. The killing made the state of Illinois change its rules in housing two prisoners together during solitary confinement; the prison authorities now must take into account both inmates' histories of violence.

== Execution site ==
Stateville Correctional Center was one of three sites in which executions were carried out by electrocution in Illinois. The electric chair was first used at Stateville in 1949. Prior to that the electric chair was housed at the Joliet Correctional Center. The state's other electrocutions were carried out at the Menard Correctional Center in Chester and at the Cook County Jail in Chicago.

In July 1977, capital punishment was reinstated in Illinois. On September 8, 1983, the state adopted lethal injection as the default method of execution in Illinois, but the electric chair remained operational to replace lethal injection if needed. Eleven executions were carried out by lethal injection at the Stateville Correctional Center between September 1990 and January 1998. In March 1998, the site of executions was moved 305 miles (491 km) southwest to the Tamms Correctional Center in Tamms, Illinois.

On March 9, 2011, Governor Pat Quinn signed legislation ending capital punishment in the state of Illinois.

== Current use ==
The prison held an average of over 3,500, at an annual cost of over $32,000 per prisoner.

Stateville's 1,300 employees make it a Level 1 facility; the highest of eight security level designations. There is also a minimum security unit commonly referred to as the Stateville Farm, which is a Level 7 facility, located within the new Northern Reception Center, located just south of the main facility. The Northern Reception Center (NRC), accepts incoming prisoners from the county jails in the northern two-thirds of the state.

Stateville is located 2 miles (3.2 km) north of Joliet, Illinois (16830 IL Route 53 Crest Hill, IL 60403; (815) 727-3607), on a site of over 2,200 acres (8.9 km^{2}), of which 64 acres (26 ha) are surrounded by a 33-foot (10 m) concrete perimeter with 10 wall towers. Stateville is often confused with the former Joliet Correctional Center, which closed in 2002. Located in the nearby city of Joliet, the former Joliet Prison is much older and smaller. It is located about 2.5 miles (4.0 km) southeast of Stateville on the corner of Woodruff Rd. and Collins St., across the Illinois and Michigan Canal.

== Replacement plans ==
In May 2021, the Illinois Department of Corrections called for Stateville to be converted from a Level 1 maximum security facility to a multi-level facility focused on returning inmates to society. In March 2024, the State announced plans to temporarily close the prison, demolish it, and construct a new facility on the grounds.

By September 30, 2024, inmates housed in units except the health care unit were moved out of Stateville Correctional Center to other correctional facilities in Illinois after a federal judge ordered the inmates to be relocated following a lawsuit.

On March 24, 2025, the last inmates in the facility's health care unit were transferred out of Stateville.

== Notable inmates ==
- Michael Alfonso – Rapist and murderer, featured on America's Most Wanted, I (Almost) Got Away with It and Unsolved Mysteries when he was listed on the FBI Ten Most Wanted Fugitives list.
- Basil Banghart – Convicted of the hoax kidnapping of John Factor, served 20 years before being declared innocent and freed.
- Robert Crimo III – Perpetrator of the 2022 Highland Park parade shooting.
- Floyd Cummings – Served 12 years for murder and later became a noted professional boxer, tying in a fight with Joe Frazier.
- Joseph Czuba – Perpetrator of the murder of Wadea al-Fayoume in 2023.
- James Degorski and Juan Luna – The perpetrators of the Brown's Chicken massacre.
- Martin James Durkin – First person to kill a federal agent in the line of duty.
- James Files – Sentenced to 50 years for the attempted murder of two policemen, originally at Stateville before being transferred to Danville Correctional Center. Later made false claims of being involved in the assassination of President John F. Kennedy.
- Cory Gregory – One of the murderers of Adrianne Reynolds.
- Jordan Hill – One of the four participants in the 2017 Chicago Torture Incident of a mentally disabled man that was captured on Facebook live.
- William Heirens – Convicted of three murders in 1946, referred to in media as The Lipstick Killer. Transferred to Vienna Correctional Center in 1975 and later Dixon Correctional Center.
- Larry Hoover – Founder of the Gangster Disciples street gang. Transferred to ADX Florence in 1997.
- Mose Jefferson – Convicted of robbery and served 9 months in 1967. Later became a field lieutenant in the Illinois Democratic Party and in 2009 was convicted of bribery in New Orleans.
- Nathan Leopold – Transferred from Joliet. Half of the infamous 1924 Leopold and Loeb case. Founded the Stateville Correspondence School with Richard Loeb.
- Richard Loeb – Transferred from Joliet and killed by another inmate. Other half of the infamous 1924 Leopold and Loeb case. Founded the Stateville Correspondence School with Nathan Leopold.
- Richard Speck – Convicted April 15, 1967 of murdering eight women.
- Edward Spreitzer – Convicted April 2, 1984 for his participation in the murders of an estimated 18 women at the hands of a satanic cult known as the Chicago Ripper Crew. He was formally given the death penalty on March 20, 1986. Governor George Ryan granted him clemency in 2003. After 17 years on death row, his sentence was reduced to life in prison without the possibility of parole.
- Guy Strait – Gay civil rights activist and child pornographer.
- Roger Touhy – Mob boss and bootlegger.
- Amos Yee – Singaporean blogger imprisoned for child pornography charges.

=== Executed ===
- Charles Walker – Double murderer who was executed in 1990 after waiving his appeals. He became the first person to be executed in Illinois since 1962.
- John Wayne Gacy – Serial killer and rapist convicted in 1980 of the murders and rapes of 33 boys and young men. Transferred from the Menard Correctional Center to Stateville Correctional Center for execution by lethal injection on May 9, 1994, and declared dead at 12:58 a.m. the following morning. Gacy was the first person involuntarily executed in Illinois since 1962.
- Hernando Williams and James Free, both executed on March 22, 1995 for separate murder cases; the first and only double execution conducted on the same date in Illinois in the modern era. Williams was found guilty of the 1978 rape and murder of Linda Goldstone while Free was found guilty of the 1978 rape and murder of Bonnie Serpico.
- Charles Albanese – Serial killer who poisoned three relatives with arsenic to obtain their inheritance. Executed in 1995.
- Girvies Davis – Serial killer who killed at least four people during robberies. Executed in 1995. Davis's younger accomplice, Richard Holman, is serving a life sentence, avoiding execution since he was a month shy of turning 18.
- Raymond Lee Stewart – Spree killer who killed six people. Executed in 1996.

== Further information ==
- In the 1940s through the 1960s, the US Army tested malaria vaccines on the prisoners, who in return received good time considerations. See main article, Stateville Penitentiary Malaria Study.
- A photograph of the interior of the F-House is used to demonstrate the concept of the panopticon in some editions of Michel Foucault's Discipline and Punish.
- MSNBC created a documentary about the Stateville Correctional Center: MSNBC Investigates Lockup.
- The prison-riot footage and scenes of a prison warden rushing down a hallway in a herd of reporters in the 1994 film Natural Born Killers were filmed in vacant buildings at Stateville while most of the prison was still in use housing inmates. Actual inmates played extras during the riot scene with rubber knives and guns. After three weeks of shooting the inmates caused an actual riot and the remainder of the film was filmed elsewhere. The roundhouse was featured in the main scenes.
- The characters on the ABC soap operas All My Children, One Life to Live, and General Hospital and the CBS soap opera As the World Turns are occasionally sent to a fictional version of Stateville (called "Statesville") to serve prison time. Similarly, in the fictional TV and movie universe of Police Squad!, characters are regularly sentenced to the Statesville Prison.
- The Stateville F-House is featured prominently in Call Northside 777 as the location where Frank Wiecek is held.
- The F-House also appears briefly in Bad Boys (1983).
- The fictional alleged assassin of George W. Bush in the dramatic mockumentary Death of a President is incarcerated at Stateville Correctional Center.
