= Girvies Davis and Richard Holman =

American serial killers

Girvies L. Davis
- Born: January 20, 1958; East St. Louis, Illinois, U.S.
- Died: May 17, 1995 (aged 37); Stateville Correctional Center, Crest Hill, Illinois, U.S.
- Cause of death: Execution by lethal injection
- Other name: The .22 Caliber Killers
- Motive: Robbery; Witness elimination
- Convictions: Murder (4 counts); Attempted murder
- Penalty: Death

Details
- Victims: 4–10+ (including an alleged victim who died from his injuries in 1985)
- Span of crimes: 1978–1979
- Country: United States
- State: Illinois
- Weapons: .22 caliber rifle (confirmed).22 caliber pistol (alleged)
- Date apprehended: August 30, 1979

Richard Holman
- Born: August 20, 1961 (age 65); East St. Louis, Illinois, U.S.
- Other names: The .22 Caliber Killers; Ricky Holman
- Children: 2
- Status: Incarcerated
- Motive: Robbery; Witness elimination
- Convictions: Murder (3 counts); Attempted murder Burglary; Criminal damage to property (3 counts)
- Penalty: Life imprisonment

Details
- Victims: 4–10+ (including an alleged victim who died from his injuries in 1985)
- Span of crimes: 1978–1979
- Country: United States
- State: Illinois
- Weapons: .22 caliber rifle (confirmed).22 caliber pistol (alleged)
- Imprisoned at: Pontiac Correctional Center

Girvies L. Davis (January 20, 1958 – May 17, 1995) and Richard "Ricky" Holman (born August 20, 1961) were American serial killers who killed at least four people during robberies in Illinois between 1978 and 1979. Davis, the older of the two, told an investigator that shooting witnesses was "easier" than wearing a mask. The two were nicknamed "The .22 Caliber Killers". Davis was executed in 1995, while Holman, who was too young to face execution, is serving a life sentence.

Davis and Holman committed their crimes at the same time and in the same region as Andre Jones and Freddie Tiller. Consequently, all four men received extensive local media coverage. Davis is also believed to have been the first death row inmate to use the Internet to plead for clemency. There was much controversy around Davis's conviction and execution. Governor Jim Edgar received 1,200 emails worldwide demanding clemency for Davis, but he refused to intervene.

== Early life ==
Davis, one of eight children, grew up in poverty in East St. Louis. His 4th grade teacher, Annie Quinley Petchulat, described him as "a poor pathetic boy who just sat there and said nothing." Before the murders, Davis was known by the police as a small-time thief, a re-seller of stolen goods, and an alcoholic.

Holman's father died when he was 7 years old, and his stepfather died when he was 16; however, he had healthy relationships with his mother and six siblings. Officials described Holman, who had between seven and nine years of formal education, as "borderline retarded." Holman likely also suffered organic brain damage at some point before 1977. He mentioned an incident where he'd fallen from a two-story building and hit his head.

When Holman was 14, he was convicted of burglary and sentenced to two years of probation. At 15, he was convicted of three counts of criminal damage to property and sent to juvenile detention. Holman was soon paroled, but had his parole revoked after being arrested for burglary three months later. He was paroled again at age 17.

== Murders, arrest, and trial ==
On December 8, 1978, Davis and Holman committed their first murder. And on that day, they allegedly robbed and killed 78-year-old Frieda Mueller. The two were alleged to have fatally shot her before stealing her television set, billfold, and checkbook. Davis and Holman were never tried for killing Mueller, but her murder was mentioned during their trials.

On December 22, 1978, exactly two weeks after they killed their first victim, 89-year-old Charles Biebel, who used a wheelchair, was fatally shot inside his trailer home. His daughter, Jean Biebel Moore, discovered his body later that evening. Davis and Holman stole two watches, a billfold, "a number of guns," and a television set. Holman was the triggerman for this murder. Before they were arrested, Jean Moore offered a $5,000 reward for information leading to the arrest and conviction of her father's killers.

Less than five months later, on May 12, 1979, Davis and Holman robbed and murdered 84-year-old John Oertel in his trailer. Oertel was shot and stabbed. Davis was the triggerman for this murder.

On July 13, 1979, Davis and Holman shot 83-year-old Esther Sepmeyer, a blind woman, execution-style as she was kneeling in front of her bed, praying for her life. Her grandson, Rodney Sepmeyer, found her body. A lawnmower, a replica antique radio, a stereo, a color TV, and a .22-caliber semi-automatic rifle were stolen. Holman was triggerman for this murder.

Davis and Holman were arrested after a botched hold-up at an auto parts store on August 30, 1979. When the two entered the store, the two immediately shot the owner, James Ostman. The bullet struck him in the arm. As Ostman fell, his clerk, 21-year-old Frank Cash, ran to the back of the store. Davis and Holman followed Cash, and Davis fatally shot the man as he pleaded for his life. Hearing the shots, a wounded Ostman grabbed his own pistol, confronted the two, and fired two shots at them, the first "with his eyes closed", and the second as the robbers fled. Davis suffered a gunshot wound to the back and was taken to the hospital. He was arrested when medical personnel called the police. Holman was arrested a few weeks later.

Officials ultimately linked Davis to 10 robberies, with nine people dead and seven wounded.

The alleged and confirmed victims were: Frieda Miller, 78; Edward Campbell, 35; Mary Prestito, 39; Charles Biebel, 89; Marvin Fourt, 25; James Perdue, 63; John Oertel, 84; Esther Sepmeyer, 83; and Frank Cash, 21. Davis and Holman were never tried for all of the murders since both of them had already received the maximum sentence allowed. Prosecutors later said the duo had committed so many murders that they thought prosecuting every case wasn't worth the effort.

John Crangle, one of Davis's alleged victims, was an employee for Perdue. Crangle was shot four times and died of his injuries six years later at the age of 52, having suffered three bullets to the abdomen and one to the throat. Crangle's daughter said he had identified Davis as the man who shot him and his boss.

Davis was convicted of four counts of murder for killing Charles Biebel, John Oertel, Frank Cash, and Esther Sepmeyer. He was also convicted of attempted murder for the shooting of John Ostman. During his sentencing hearing, Davis's wife, Cindy, testified that he was not a violent man and she would visit him in prison if he was spared execution. Davis received a 30-year sentence for the shooting of Ostman, an 80-year sentence for killing Oertel and Cash, and a death sentence for killing Biebel. He received another death sentence for killing Sepmeyer, but this was reduced to life without parole on appeal. While Davis was not present for Biebel's murder, he was convicted under the felony murder rule, on the grounds that after having committing similar murders with Holman, he would've been well aware that Holman was going to murder Biebel.

Holman was convicted of three counts of murder for killing Oertel, Cash, and Sepmeyer, and the attempted murder of Ostman. He received a 75-year sentence for killing Oertel and Cash and a concurrent 25-year sentence for the shooting of Ostman. Holman was sentenced to life in prison without parole for killing Sepmeyer, avoiding a death sentence since he was barely a month shy of 18 at the time. The judge told Holman that he did not believe he could be rehabilitated since he had shown no remorse, and that the life term was necessary to protect the public. He was never tried for killing Biebel.

Two other men, Bryan Lawrence and Keith Harris, were wrongfully convicted of the attempted murder of Mark Resmann. In 1979, Lawrence received a 40-year sentence, while Harris received a 50-year sentence. On December 4, 1978, Resmann, a gas station clerk, was shot seven times, but survived, after giving $200 to two robbers. Although Resmann identified Harris in a lineup, no physical evidence linked him to the crime. Davis and Holman had confessed to the crime and ballistic evidence linked them to the shooting of Resmann, and police now believe they were responsible for the crime. Lawrence was released from prison in 1999.

Harris was released from prison on May 1, 2001, after his sentence was reduced to 30 years. Governor George Ryan granted him a full pardon in 2003. Harris received $154,153 in compensation for the time he spent in prison.

== Davis’s claim of partial innocence ==
Davis conceded his involvement in two robberies in which the victims were slain, but denied his guilt in the killing of Biebel, the crime which sent him to death row. He also denied having personally committed any murders.

Although Holman's confession had implicated Davis in additional murders in which he was believed to be the triggerman, Davis argued that his own confession had been physically coerced by investigators, and claimed that they had threatened to kill him if he did not talk. The police denied all of these allegations. Davis was reportedly illiterate and could not read or write aside from his name, which raised questions over if he understood the written confession he had signed. One juror wrote to Governor Edgar asking for clemency after hearing of Davis's illiteracy, saying he would not have convicted Davis if he had known he could not read the confession.

In response to protesters asking for Davis's death sentence to be commuted to life in prison, prosecutors said they were prepared to try him for the other murders which they suspected him of committing if he were taken off death row.

At Davis's clemency hearing, numerous relatives of his victims asked the Illinois Prisoner Review Board not to recommend clemency. Pam Cash, the widow of Frank Cash, who had given birth to her first child only 30 hours after her husband was murdered, said someone responsible for so many murders did not deserve any mercy. Jean Biebel Moore described finding her father's body while delivering groceries three days before Christmas. "I found him sitting in his wheelchair dead, with a bloody wound in his chest," she said. "For the past 16 years, I have tried to erase that image from my mind, but I have not succeeded."

== Davis's imprisonment and execution ==
While on death row, Davis learned to read and became an ordained minister, serving as a spiritual adviser to other inmates. After numerous failed appeals and a failed clemency petition to Governor Jim Edgar, he was executed by lethal injection on May 17, 1995. Davis declined a last meal and his last words were "I wish Godspeed to all." He was pronounced dead at 12:28 a.m.

== Aftermath ==
Holman remains in prison to this day, and is serving his sentence at Pontiac Correctional Center. In recent years, he has tried to have his life sentence reduced to a term of years under the Miller v. Alabama and Montgomery v. Louisiana rulings, which limited life terms without parole for minors. However, Holman's efforts have been unsuccessful, and his life sentence stands as of 2024.

After the Illinois Supreme Court refused to vacate his life sentence under Miller, Holman brought a post-conviction petition challenging his sentence of life imprisonment without parole pursuant to the Proportionate Penalties Clause of Article I, Section 11 of the Illinois Constitution of 1970, which states in relevant part: “All penalties shall be determined both according to the seriousness of the offense and with the objective of restoring the offender to useful citizenship.” In his petition, Holman argued that his sentence of life imprisonment without parole for offenses committed when he was 17 years old violated the Proportionate Penalties Clause and entitled him to a new sentencing hearing.

Holman's post-conviction petition met with initial success. The court held that Holman's petition raised a potential constitutional violation and granted him an evidentiary hearing, which took place on February 22, 2022, in the Circuit Court of Madison County, Illinois. At this hearing, Holman testified for the first time about the murders committed in 1979 when he was 17 years old, for which he was sentenced to life imprisonment without parole in 1981. The facts elicited at this hearing are contained in Defendant's Post-Hearing Brief in Support of His Post-Conviction Petition (May 25, 2022), People v. Holman, No. 80 CF 5 (Madison Cty., Ill. Cir. Ct.) and summarized below.

Based on the evidence presented at this post-conviction hearing, a psychological evaluation done in connection with Holman's sentencing found that he scored in the borderline range of retardation on the verbal I.Q. test with a score of 73 and in the mildly retarded range on the performance I.Q. test with a score of 64. Holman dropped out of school in the tenth grade, when he was 15 years old.

Holman testified that after he dropped out of school, he worked at odd jobs. When Holman was 16 or 17 years old, Girvies Davis, Holman's girlfriend's older brother, started paying Holman "5, 10, 15 dollars" to drive him around.

Holman testified that on July 13, 1979, he was driving around with Davis when they spotted what Holman thought was an abandoned house. Davis directed Holman to turn into the driveway and park, after which Davis broke into the house. Davis came back outside and directed Holman to go into the house and carry out stuff that Davis had piled at the back door and load it into their car. Holman testified that he did not know until he was told by detectives when he was arrested two months later, on September 5, 1979, that an 83-year-old woman, Esther Sepmeyer, had been shot inside the house on July 13, 1979. It was Sepmeyer's murder for which Holman was convicted and sentenced to life imprisonment without parole.

Holman also testified about the murders of John Oertel and Frank Cash, for which he was convicted in St. Clair County, Illinois before the Sepmeyer trial. Holman admitted to being present when these murders occurred but explained his role. With respect to Oertel, Holman testified that he was sleeping outside in a car when Oertel was stabbed to death in a trailer, which Holman learned only after he woke up, went into the trailer, and saw Oertel with a knife in his chest. With respect to Cash and the attempted murder of a second person, James Ostman, Holman testified he drove Davis to an auto parts store because Davis said he needed to buy an auto part. Holman testified that while he was outside the store, he heard gunshots and drove away, leaving Davis at the store. Davis was later convicted of murder and attempted murder for shooting Cash and Ostman, respectively.

Holman testified that while he did not shoot Esther Sepmeyer, he regrets driving Girvies Davis to her home on July 13, 1979, "every day of my life." Holman further testified that he is not the same person today as he was when he was taken into custody in September 1979. When asked to tell the Court how he had changed, Holman said: "Well, most importantly I accepted Jesus Christ as my personal Lord and Savior." Holman's post-conviction petition for a resentencing hearing was denied. His appeal from the denial of his post-conviction petition is pending.

== See also ==
- Capital punishment in Illinois
- List of people executed by lethal injection
- List of people executed in Illinois
- List of people executed in the United States in 1995
- List of serial killers in the United States

Executions carried out in Illinois
Preceded by Hernando Williams March 22, 1995	Girvies Davis; May 17, 1995	Succeeded by Charles Albanese September 20, 1995
Executions carried out in the United States
Preceded by Thomas Lee Ward – Louisiana May 16, 1995	Girvies Davis – Illinois; May 17, 1995	Succeeded by Darrell Devier Sr. – Georgia May 17, 1995
