= Lynn Sweet =

American journalist

- Born: Chicago, Illinois
- Education: Northwestern University Medill School of Journalism
- Occupation: Journalist
- Notable credit(s): Medill Hall of Achievement, Chicago Journalism Hall of Fame
- Title: Washington Bureau chief, Chicago Sun-Times

Lynn Sweet is an American journalist, who became the Washington, D.C. bureau chief for the Chicago Sun-Times in October 2013. She has been with the Sun-Times for over four decades, joining in 1976. Sweet is also a columnist for The Hill and The Huffington Post. She has appeared on CNN and MSNBC as a political analyst and has been a frequent guest on C-SPAN and Charlie Rose.

In 2009, Sweet was among the winners of the "50 Top Journalists" of the year, chosen by Washingtonian. In naming Sweet, she was described as, "a one-woman multimedia newsroom who often seems to out-produce whole teams of correspondents."

During her career, Sweet built a reputation as being committed to accountability in journalism; her philosophy is described in remarks made at 5th annual Washington Women in Journalism Awards, in 2018:

"The most important thing is for journalists to do the job, no matter what platform, and not be distracted by everything going on around you...Get it right, make the extra call, these principles never change. Look up the extra document, just the things that you do every day no matter if it's your first day or your last...A fact is fact."

== Education and background ==
Sweet, a Chicago native, attended the University of Illinois Urbana-Champaign, majoring in English. However, she transferred in her senior year to the University of California at Berkeley, where she changed her major to Political Science; Sweet graduated in 1973. After graduation, she worked doing odd jobs, and at a department store in Oakland, California, before enrolling at the Northwestern University Medill School of Journalism.

In 1975, Sweet graduated with her master's degree from the Medill School of Journalism. She was inducted into the Medill Hall of Achievement in 2006. Sweet was a Spring 2004 Fellow at the Harvard Institute of Politics.

== Career ==
Sweet landed her first job in the newspaper business at the weekly Independent-Register in Libertyville, Illinois; she also worked for Time magazine, until 1976, when she started at the Sun-Times working with "Action Time," a consumer help feature. Later, Sweet became a general assignment reporter, first covering Cook County government and the Daley Center courts, gaining experience in Chicago politics.

Her experience in politics and government grew as she covered the Illinois legislature and worked as the paper's chief political writer. Sweet was one of the first reporters in the country to fact-check state and local political advertisements. By 1993, she was considered the "voice of Washington politics" for the Chicago Sun-Times. She was also gaining a reputation from her colleagues, for her tenacity and tough stance in political reporting.

Sweet was working in Washington when she wrote a series of stories exposing the Democratic National Committee offering big money donors access to the Clinton White House and the Clinton administration's practice of allowing donors to fly on Air Force One.

Christopher Beam, of Slate magazine, said of Sweet, "the first time I saw her, she was berating a Hillary advance person at a sheet metal factory in Las Vegas for refusing to hold a press availability. It was marvelous. The other journalists shrank while Sweet chewed out the staffer. It was like good reporter/bad reporter."

Sweet witnessed the Highland Park parade shooting and recorded footage of it.

=== Coverage of Barack Obama ===
In 1999, when Barack Obama was running for the seat in the House of Representatives, he paid a visit to Sweet and gave her a copy of his book, Dreams from My Father, which she says she put on a bookshelf and never opened until June 2004, as his popularity rose and he had given his speech at the Democratic National Convention. In a 2008 interview, Sweet said, "Obama came in and had a very lucky break to come in 90-something, make some of the right connections, and have an opening." Unimpressed with his rise in popularity, she went on to add:

"He returned to Chicago and worked with a law firm that gave him a lot of political network advantages, and started looking around for some office to run for, found this opening in the State Senate where he put himself in it. Now that’s not coming through the rough-and-tough of Chicago politics. And then once he knocked his opponent off the ballot, he represented a safe Democratic district, and that if he chose to, he could have represented until he stopped working. O.K.?"

Sweet would become known as one of Obama's toughest critics. In February 2007, when he announced his Presidential bid, Sweet wrote in the Sun-Times, "Sen. Barack Obama (D-Ill.) used campaign donations generated by PACs and lobbyists to bankroll the birth of his White House bid — though he’s banning that money for his presidential 2008 race."

in 2008, Jim Romenesko wrote about Sweet, in an article titled: Sun-Times’ Sweet is an “important voice,” thanks to Obama:

"Prior to this year’s political season, Lynn Sweet “was a largely unknown tabloid reporter from a regional newspaper who had never seriously covered a presidential campaign,” writes John Koblin. But with Barack Obama‘s ascent, the Sun-Times reporter/columnist has suddenly emerged as one of the most important voices in the campaign. Newsday’s Glenn Thrush says: “Of all the people who cover Obama, she’s the one who holds him most accountable."

Arianna Huffington, of the Huffington Post, described how "Sweet once took a room at the Beverly Hilton hotel, where Obama was holding a big presidential fundraiser. She booked the room so she could see who was going in and out."

When NorthStar news reported on President-elect Obama's first press conference, Sweet's name was invoked: "Despite the serious tone of the news conference, the president-elect appeared relaxed and joked with reporters on several occasions. When he called upon a local journalist, Lynn Sweet of the Chicago Sun-Times, and noticed her arm was in a sling, he asked what had happened. When Sweet replied that she had injured her shoulder en route to Obama’s victory celebration in Grant Park, President-elect Obama smiled and said, “I think that was the only major incident during the entire Grant Park celebration." She continued her tough reporting throughout his time in office and frequently speaks about her experience covering his administration.

== Awards and recognition ==
- 2006 Medill Hall of Achievement, Northwestern University School of Journalism
- 2007 Chicago Journalism Hall of Fame
- 2009 Winner of the Washingtonian Magazine's 50 Top Journalists of the year
- 2013 Winner of the Bill and Patrice Brandt Alumni Leadership Award by the University of California, Berkeley, for her 2012 presidential campaign and election coverage
- 2014 Nominee for the Peter Lisagor Award, for best news column or commentary "selection of three columns by Lynn Sweet"
- 2018 Winner of the Women in Journalism Award for outstanding journalist in print
- 2019 Power 25 List of the most powerful women in journalism
