= Ripper Crew =

American cult and organized crime group

- Booking photos; left to right: Robin Gecht, Andrew Kokoraleis, Thomas Kokoraleis, and Edward Spreitzer
- Born: Robin Gecht; November 30, 1953 (age 72); Menard, Illinois, U.S. Andrew Kokoraleis; July 18, 1963; Villa Park, Illinois, U.S. Thomas Kokoraleis; July 10, 1960 (age 66); Villa Park, Illinois, U.S. Edward Spreitzer; January 5, 1961 (age 65); Chicago, Illinois, U.S.
- Died: Andrew Kokoraleis; March 17, 1999 (aged 35); Tamms Correctional Center, Tamms, Illinois, U.S.
- Cause of death: Andrew Kokoraleis; Execution by lethal injection
- Other names: The Chicago Rippers; The Ripper Crew
- Status: Robin Gecht and Edward Spreitzer; Incarcerated; Andrew Kokoraleis; Executed; Thomas Kokoraleis; Released
- Conviction: Everyone except Gecht was convicted of at least one count of murder
- Penalty: Robin Gecht; 120 years imprisonment Andrew Kokoraleis; Death; Thomas Kokoraleis; Life imprisonment; commuted to 70 years imprisonment Edward Spreitzer; Death; commuted to life imprisonment

Details
- Victims: 17 (6 convicted; 5 for Spreitzer, 1 for the Kokoraleis brothers)
- Span of crimes: May 23, 1981 – October 6, 1982
- Country: United States
- State: Illinois
- Date apprehended: October 20 - November 12, 1982

The Ripper Crew or the Chicago Rippers was an organized crime group of serial killers, cannibals, rapists, and necrophiles. The group was composed of Robin Gecht and three associates: Edward Spreitzer and brothers Andrew and Thomas Kokoraleis. They were suspected in the murders of seventeen people by beheading, dismembering, disemboweling and gouging heart and lungs out or skinning in Illinois in 1981 and 1982, as well as the unrelated fatal shooting of a man in a random drive-by shooting. According to one of the detectives who investigated the case, Gecht "made Manson look like a Boy Scout."

== Murders ==
The gang's first victim was 28-year-old Linda Sutton, who was abducted on May 23, 1981. Ten days later, her mutilated body, with the left breast amputated, was discovered in a field behind the Moonlit Motel. On May 15, 1982, they abducted Lorraine Borowski as she was about to open the realtor's office where she worked. Her body was discovered five months later in a cemetery in Clarendon Hills.

On May 29, they abducted 30-year-old Shui Mak from Hanover Park at night. Mak, a recent Chinese immigrant, had argued with her brother, who was driving them both home, over their sister's marriage to an American. As the argument intensified, her brother abandoned Mak on the side of the road. She was then kidnapped by the gang, who mocked her with anti-Chinese slurs and repeatedly punched her until she was knocked out.

Mak's body was not found for four months. Two weeks after they abducted Mak, they picked up Angel York in their van, handcuffed her, and slashed her breast before throwing her out of the van, still alive. York's description of her attackers failed to produce any leads.

On August 28, 1982, the body of Sandra Delaware was discovered on the bank of the Chicago River. She had been stabbed, strangled, and her left breast was amputated. On September 8, 31-year-old Rose Davis was found in an alley, having suffered almost identical injuries as Delaware.

On October 6, 1982, the gang shot 28-year-old Rafael Tirado, a local drug dealer, and his friend, 18-year-old Alberto Rosario, at a phone booth in a random drive-by shooting. According to Spreitzer, he was driving with Gecht when the older man told him to slow down. Gecht took two guns from the back of the car, told Spreitzer to stop the car, and then opened fire on Tirado and Rosario, hitting both. Rosario survived his injuries; Tirado died at a hospital. Tirado was the gang's only male victim.

That same day, the gang committed their final crime. Robin Gecht lured prostitute Beverley Washington into his car by offering more money than she asked of him, and she was later found by a railroad track. In addition to other injuries, her left breast had been amputated, and her right breast was severely slashed. She survived the attack and gave descriptions of Gecht and his van where the attack took place.

The men were suspects in the disappearance of Carole Pappas, wife of Chicago Cubs pitcher Milt Pappas. She disappeared on September 11, 1982. Her body was recovered five years later, and the death was ruled an accident.

== Arrest and convictions ==
When Gecht was first arrested, he had to be released since the police had insufficient evidence to connect him to the crimes. After further investigation, though, the police discovered that in 1981, he rented a motel room along with three friends who each had adjoining rooms. The hotel manager said they had held loud parties and appeared to be involved in some kind of cult.

Robin Gecht was first arrested on October 20, 1982, after police connected his van to the October 6 attack on Beverley Washington. Several days later, Gecht posted bond and was released. Police re-arrested Gecht on November 5 and then tracked down the other men, Edward Spreitzer and the Kokoraleis brothers. Gecht was later indicted and ordered to be held on $1 million bond.

Andrew Kokoraleis was arrested on November 7, and he and Spreitzer confessed to up to 17 murders. Three days later they were indicted and ordered held without bond.

Thomas Kokoraleis was arrested on November 12. When interrogated, he confessed that he and the others took women back to Gecht's place – what Gecht called a "satanic chapel". There they raped and tortured the women and amputated their breasts with a wire garrote. Kokoraleis stated that they ate parts of the severed breasts as a kind of sacrament and that Gecht masturbated into the breasts before putting them in a box. Kokoraleis claimed he once saw 15 breasts in the box.

Gecht, the only member of the gang to maintain his innocence, was never tried for any of the murders due to a lack of evidence. In 1983, he was convicted of attempted murder, aggravated kidnapping, deviate sexual assaults, and rape for the non-fatal rape and assault of Beverly Washington. Gecht was sentenced to 120 years in prison. Before sentencing Gecht, Judge Francis J. Mahon told him, "Only a devil would do these things. An animal would not do these things. A monster would." He pointed out that Gecht left Washington for dead and was lucky to not be on trial for murder.

Gecht is serving his sentence at Danville Correctional Center. His projected parole date is October 10, 2042, when he will be 88 years old.

In 1984, in a bid for leniency, Spreitzer pleaded guilty to murder in the deaths of Shui Mak, Rose Davis, Sandra Delaware, and Rafael Tirado, as well as attempted murder, aggravated kidnapping, deviant sexual assault, and rape. He was sentenced to life in prison without parole.

In 1986, Spreitzer was convicted of murder and aggravated kidnapping in the death of Linda Sutton. The prosecution sought a death sentence. During the sentencing phase, Spreitzer's attorney Carol Anfinson argued he was "immature, impulsive and simplistic", and was following the orders of the gang's leader Robin Gecht. She described him as a lonely person who would "do almost anything" to please his friend. The prosecution described Spreitzer as "every woman's nightmare," calling the gang "cowardly weasels who roamed in packs to prey on women." Spreitzer was sentenced to death.

In 1985, Andrew Kokoraleis was convicted of murder, aggravated kidnapping, and rape in the death of Rose Davis. The prosecution sought a death sentence. During the sentencing phase, Andrew's attorney said his client had been "a follower ... not an organizer, not the prime mover" in Davis's murder. The jury spared Andrew's life after deliberating for 90 minutes, and he was sentenced to life in prison without parole.

On March 18, 1987, Andrew was convicted of murder and aggravated kidnapping in the death of Lorraine Borowski. He was sentenced to death on April 30, 1987, and executed by lethal injection on March 17, 1999. He declined a last meal. Andrew's last words were: "To the Borowski family, I am truly sorry for your loss. I mean this sincerely." He then cited verses from the Biblical books of Exodus and Proverbs and added: "Repent ye, for the kingdom of heaven is at hand."

In 2003, Spreitzer's sentence was commuted to life in prison without parole after Governor George H. Ryan commuted the sentences of everyone on death row in Illinois. Incidentally, Andrew Kokoraleis was Governor Ryan's only execution, just over two months into his administration. Andrew was also the last inmate executed in Illinois, almost 12 years before Governor Pat Quinn signed legislation to abolish the death penalty on March 9, 2011, and commuted the sentences of the state's last 15 death row inmates to life imprisonment without parole.

The Kokoraleis brothers were raised Greek Orthodox. The Orthodox Church attempted unsuccessfully to keep Andrew Kokoraleis from being executed. Demetrios Kantzavelos, then a chancellor (later a bishop) of the Greek Orthodox Metropolis of Chicago, became an anti–death penalty activist as a result of the execution and helped lobby to end the death penalty in the state.

Thomas Kokoraleis was convicted of murder and rape in the death of Lorraine Borowski. As a reward for his detailed confession, he was sentenced to life in prison without parole. On appeal, Thomas's rape conviction was reversed, and he won a new trial on his murder conviction. Rather than face a retrial, Thomas pleaded guilty to Borowski's murder in exchange for a 70-year sentence. Charges in the murder of Linda Sutton were dismissed as part of the plea agreement. Thomas was scheduled to be paroled on September 30, 2017, but was denied release after he did not find an approved place to live. He was released from prison on March 29, 2019. In an interview with WBBM-TV, Thomas proclaimed his innocence, saying, "Everybody thinks I'm a monster. I'm not a monster." As of August 2024, Kokoraleis resided in Peoria, Illinois.

At the time of his arrest, Thomas Kokoraleis was a painter with no criminal record. He was described as having a "borderline range of intellect", with an IQ of 75.

== David Gecht ==
Robin Gecht's son David was one of dozens of people who were wrongly convicted based on misconduct by Chicago police detective Reynaldo Guevara. The misconduct included coercing false confessions through violence and coercing false identifications from witnesses.

In March 1999, 18-year-old David was charged with first-degree murder for the gang-related killing of Roberto Cruz, 35, on January 29, 1999, in northwest Chicago. Two other men, 19-year-old Richard Kwil and 27-year-old Ruben Hernandez, were also charged.

He was convicted of first-degree murder and sentenced to 45 years in prison. He was serving his sentences at Pontiac Correctional Center.

On May 25, 2022, Gecht was granted a new trial. On July 18, 2022, he was officially exonerated. In March 2023, Gecht filed a federal civil rights lawsuit against the city of Chicago and Cook County and Guevara seeking compensation for his wrongful conviction. In October 2024, Cook County settled the lawsuit for $3.1 million.

== See also ==
- Capital punishment in Illinois
- List of homicides in Illinois
- List of most recent executions by jurisdiction
- List of people executed in Illinois
- List of people executed in the United States in 1999
- List of serial killers in the United States

Executions carried out in Illinois
Preceded by Lloyd Wayne Hampton January 21, 1998	Andrew Kokoraleis; March 17, 1999	Succeeded by none
Executions carried out in the United States
Preceded by Roy Michael Roberts – Missouri March 10, 1999	Andrew Kokoraleis – Illinois; March 17, 1999	Succeeded by David Lee Fisher – Virginia March 25, 1999
