= Shirley Coleman =

American politician and pastor

City of Chicago Alderman
- In office January 27, 1991 – May 30, 2007
- Preceded by: Anna Langford
- Succeeded by: JoAnn Thompson
- Constituency: 16th Ward

Personal details
- Born: Shirley Ann Turner; December 4, 1955 (age 70) Sunflower, Mississippi, U.S.
- Party: Democratic Party
- Spouses: Hernando Williams (m. 1973; div. 1977) David Coleman (m. 1979)
- Children: 2
- Education: Lindblom Technical High School; B.A. Chicago State University
- Occupation: Politician; pastor

Shirley Ann Coleman (née Turner; born December 4, 1955) is an American politician and pastor. Coleman is a former alderman of the 16th ward in Chicago, Illinois. Coleman was first elected in January 1991, serving for sixteen years until May 2007 when she lost a run-off election to JoAnn Thompson after coming in second in the 2007 general election. As of 2017, Coleman is the only alderman to date elected in the 16th Ward for four consecutive terms. Coleman made history as the only African American Chicago female alderman who is an ordained minister and pastor.

== Early life ==
Coleman was born in Sunflower, Mississippi, but her family moved to Chicago's south side shortly after her birth. Coleman was the youngest of thirteen children. Coleman attended Lindblom Technical High School (now Lindblom Math and Science Academy), graduating in 1973 and later receiving her bachelor's degree from Chicago State University. After college, Coleman worked for the Chicago Osteopathic Hospital. After her tenure at the hospital, Coleman worked for the Illinois Department of Human Services as a district manager.

== Political career ==
=== Alderman (1991–2007) ===
Coleman was first elected in January 1991 after former Alderman Anna Langford decided not to run again. Before the 1995 city election, it became public that Coleman's former husband, Hernando Williams, was on death row awaiting execution for the 1978 kidnapping, rape, and murder of Linda Goldstone, but Coleman was re-elected despite that new information. As alderman, Coleman focused on issues of crime and poverty which are major problems in her ward. Coleman served on six committees: Budget and Government Operations; Committees, Rules and Ethics; Education; Finance; Health; and License and Consumer Protection (where she served as Vice Chairman). In addition to serving as Alderman, Coleman also served as the Democratic Committeeman for sixteen years from 1992 until 2008.

== Personal life ==
Coleman has been married twice, first to Hernando Williams from 1973 until 1977 and presently to David Coleman since 1979. Coleman has two daughters, Shirlynda (b. 1976; with Hernando Williams) and Stephanie (b. 1988; with her husband David Coleman) who is currently serving as the Democratic Committeemen, making them the first mother and daughter team to have served as such in this capacity. Coleman has five grandchildren. Since October 1999, Coleman has been the pastor at the Spiritual Wholistic Ministries of Love & Faith where she delivers sermons and teaches Bible classes. During her years as pastor, Coleman has reached over 10,000 vessels through various outreach programs: prison ministry, food and clothing, and community outreach. Stemming from her Englewood roots, Coleman is now a resident of the Village of Riverdale, and working hard to meet the needs of the residents of the village.

Hernando Williams was executed for his crime on March 22, 1995. On March 30, 1978, Williams, robbed and kidnapped Linda Goldstone in Chicago, then took her to a motel and raped her. He released her two days later, only to then shoot and kill her when she tried to get help.
