= 2022 Highland Park parade shooting =

Mass shooting in Illinois, U.S.

Highland Park parade shooting
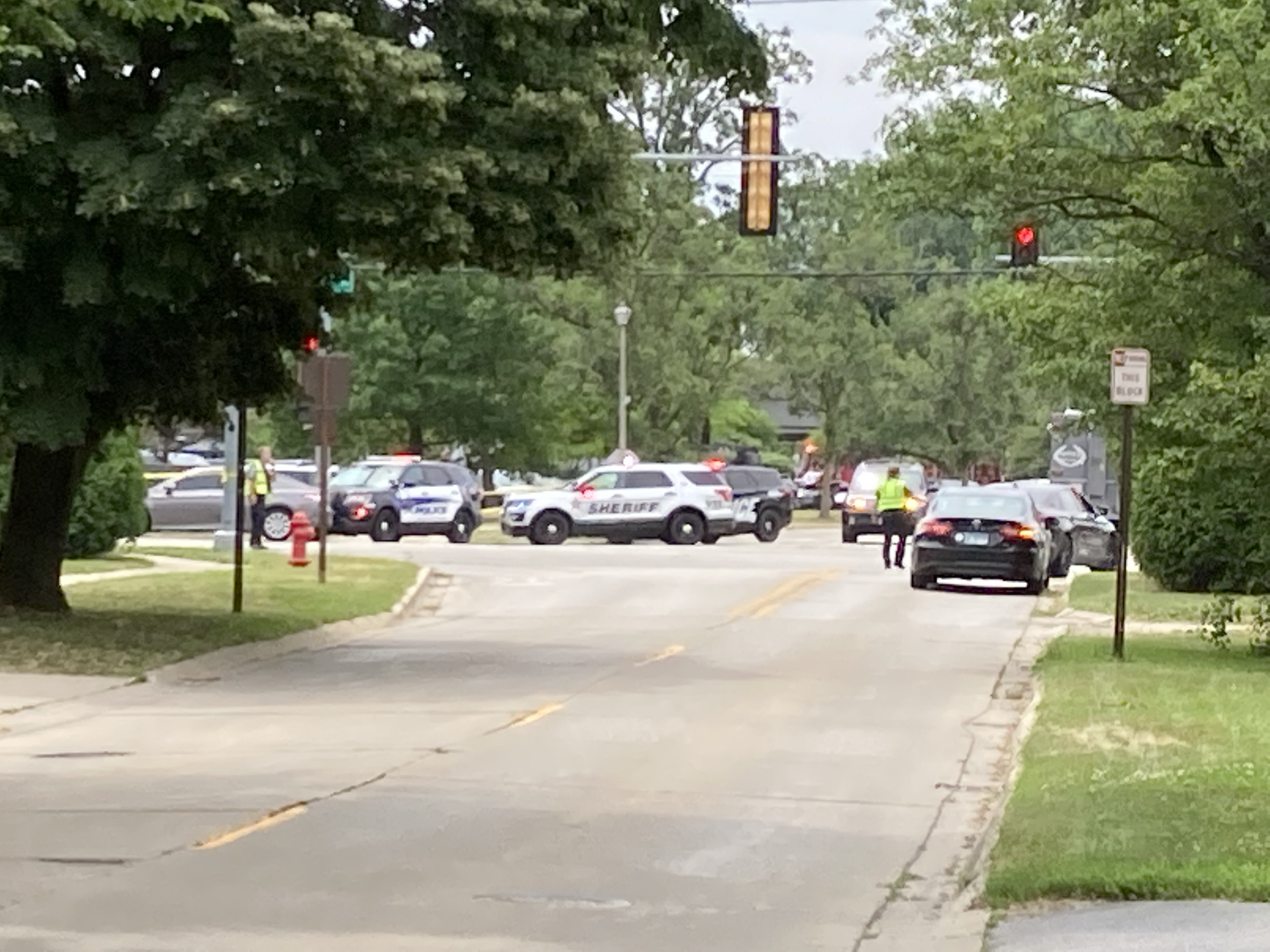
- Highland Park police after the shooting
- Location: 42°11′06″N 87°48′04″W; Central Ave. and 2nd St. in Highland Park, Illinois, U.S.
- Date: July 4, 2022; 4 years ago 10:14 a.m. (CDT; UTC−05:00)
- Target: People attending or participating in a Fourth of July parade
- Attack type: Mass shooting; mass murder
- Weapons: Smith & Wesson M&P15 semi-automatic rifle; Kel-Tec SUB-2000 (unused)
- Deaths: 7
- Injuries: 48
- Perpetrator: Robert Eugene Crimo III
- Motive: Unknown
- Charges: Aggravated battery (48 counts; dismissed before trial)
- Sentence: Seven consecutive life sentences without the possibility of parole, plus 2,400 years
- Convictions: First-degree murder (21 counts) (Note: There are three counts per deceased victim.); Attempted murder (48 counts)

On July 4, 2022, a mass shooting occurred during an Independence Day parade in Highland Park, Illinois, United States. The shooting occurred at 10:14 a.m., roughly 15 minutes after the parade had started. Seven people were killed, and 48 others were wounded by bullets or shrapnel.

Authorities apprehended 21-year-old Robert Eugene "Bobby" Crimo III more than eight hours after the shooting and charged him the next day with seven counts of first-degree murder. On July 27, the charges were upgraded to 21 counts of first-degree murder, 48 counts of attempted murder, and 48 counts of aggravated battery.

Crimo pleaded guilty to all charges on March 3, 2025, shortly before his trial was to begin. At that time his sentencing was set for April 23. By law, he faced a mandatory life sentence. On April 24, 2025, Crimo was sentenced to 7 consecutive life sentences plus 2,400 years without parole.

== Background ==
Highland Park is an affluent suburban community of about 30,000 located in southeastern Lake County, Illinois, United States, 25 miles (40 km) north of Chicago, in the area's North Shore. The city held a Fourth of July celebration which included a parade that began at 10:00 a.m. CDT (UTC−05:00). The parade started at the intersection of Laurel and St. Johns Avenues, headed north on St. Johns Avenue, then turned west on Central Avenue, and continued to Sunset Woods Park.

== Events ==
=== Shooting ===
The shooting began at 10:14 a.m. in downtown Highland Park, with the shooter firing a rifle from the rooftop of the Ross Cosmetics building, a local store on the northwest corner of Central Avenue and 2nd Street. The gunman had gained access to the elevated position by using an unsecured ladder attached to the building.

The shooter used a Smith & Wesson M&P15 rifle with three 30-round magazines. A total of 83 shots were fired. Victims included spectators and some of those marching in the parade. At least one parade attendee provided medical treatment to those injured, before first responders arrived. Footage shot by Chicago Sun-Times reporter Lynn Sweet, a spectator at the parade, shows a participating klezmer band on a float continuing to play as gunfire began, and many attendees running while screaming. Additional photos of the scene were captured by attendees and posted to social media.

=== Manhunt and suspect's capture ===
Over 100 law enforcement officers from multiple agencies responded to the shooting. The shooter ceased firing as law enforcement officers approached the building, fled the scene and evaded immediate capture. During his escape, the rifle Crimo used fell from his bag and was recovered by police within minutes. He then drove to the Madison, Wisconsin area, with a Kel-Tec SUB-2000 rifle in his car. He considered attacking another Independence Day celebration in Madison, but decided against it. He discarded his cell phone in Middleton, Wisconsin.

A driver from Waukegan and his passengers spotted Crimo's damaged 2010 Honda Fit southbound on U.S Route 41 near Wadsworth. Over the next 13 minutes, they relayed information to 911 operators. Crimo was stopped by North Chicago and Lake Forest Police units at the intersection of U.S. Route 41 and Westleigh Road in Lake Forest, Illinois, and apprehended without incident at approximately 6:30 p.m., more than eight hours after the shooting began.

== Victims ==
Seven people were killed and 48 others were injured by either bullets or shrapnel during the attack. Five of the victims—all adults—died at the scene, and two died at the hospital.

Mexican authorities have said two men killed at the parade were "natives of the country." One of these was a 78-year-old Mexican grandfather who was visiting family in the area, and another was a 69-year-old man. Three Jewish victims that were killed were a 63-year-old woman, an 88-year-old grandfather, and a 35-year-old woman. Another was a 64-year-old mother of two. The victims ranged in age from 8 to 88 years old. Highland Park Hospital reported that they were treating 26 people after the shooting, 25 being gunshot wounds, with five later transferred to Evanston Hospital. One of the wounded victims was rendered paraplegic. Additionally, four of the injured were transported to Glenbrook Hospital, and several others were taken to hospitals outside of the Northshore University Medical System network.

== Investigation ==
Highland Park authorities collaborated with the FBI, Illinois State Police, and Chicago Police during the investigation and manhunt. The police believe only one shooter was involved and the shooting was described as appearing to be "very random (and) very intentional". After his arrest, Crimo's home in Highwood, a small suburb just north of Highland Park, was raided by FBI agents.

Lake County authorities alleged that Crimo planned the attack for weeks, and that he dressed in women's clothing and hid his facial tattoos in order to flee the scene after the attack, among panicked parade-goers. Highland Park Mayor Nancy Rotering said that she believed that the weapon used in the crime was obtained legally. Police seized three rifles, one shotgun, and one handgun from Crimo.

Crimo's motives remain unclear. The London-based Institute for Strategic Dialogue said it appeared Crimo's extensive online presence contained posts that gravitated toward far-right and neo-fascist ideologies. A Highland Park rabbi stated that, three months before the shooting, Crimo had entered Central Avenue Synagogue, a Chabad house, during the Passover Seder and was asked to leave. The Chabad House is located two blocks from where the July 4 shooting occurred. However, investigators have determined no racial or religious motivation for the shooting. Michael Masters, national director and CEO of the Secure Community Network headquartered in Chicago, said, "Nothing overtly we have identified in his social media posts says this was an antisemitic attack, but we are coordinating with law enforcement. Apparently on social media, there are some indications he was ideating around the Fourth of July for some period of time, which would indicate this was not an attack on one particular community."

According to experts on QAnon and conspiracy theory movements, Crimo's social media diet, while extreme, was distinct from the realm of QAnon. Mike Rothschild, an author who has written on QAnon, said, "[T]he world Crimo lived in was pretty far off Q. He was in a 4chan bubble of ironic Nazi and anime memes, fascist-inspired music, and mass shooter ideation that basically consumes nothing but irony and sadness."

== Legal proceedings ==
=== Criminal case ===
Robert Eugene Crimo III (born September 20, 2000) was charged on July 5 with seven counts of first-degree murder. The next day, he confessed to the shooting. Lake County Sheriff's Office said that he is being held without bail. A preliminary hearing was scheduled for July 28, 2022, but the hearing was obviated when a Lake County, Illinois grand jury indicted Crimo on July 27, 2022. Crimo was indicted on 117 felony counts: for each of the 7 deceased victims, three counts of first-degree murder (21 counts), and for each of the 48 victims struck by a bullet or shrapnel, one count of attempted murder (48 counts) and one count of aggravated battery (48 additional counts).

Crimo initially pleaded not guilty, and his trial was originally set for February 2025. At a June 2024 hearing, it was anticipated that Crimo would plead guilty to 55 counts, including 7 counts of first degree murder, and immediately be sentenced. However, during the hearing he declined to change his not guilty plea.

Jury selection for Crimo's trial began on February 24, 2025. That same day, prosecutors dropped aggravated battery charges against him. On March 3, 2025, Crimo pleaded guilty to all 69 counts, just hours before his trial was set to begin. His sentencing was set for April 23, 2025. The maximum sentence Crimo could face in Illinois was imprisonment for life. Following his guilty plea, his mother Denise made a quiet comment in the courtroom that prompted the judge to halt the proceedings. She continued to sit in the courtroom after a warning from the judge, but following proceedings, Denise stormed out of the Lake County Courthouse. In an interview with WGN-TV outside the courthouse, she said that "[Crimo] had no free will to make his own choices, and he has never had any outside help."

On April 24, 2025, Crimo was sentenced to 7 consecutive life sentences without the possibility of parole, plus 2,400 years (50 years on each of the 48 counts of attempted murder), to be served consecutively to the life sentences. His sentencing caused anger to the injured victims inside the court because Crimo would've potentially been afforded the time to address an apology to them. During the recess, the state's attorney told victims that it was his belief the sentence had already been handed down, and therefore it was too late for Crimo to speak during the hearing.

On April 25, 2025, Crimo was transferred to the Stateville Correctional Center in Crest Hill to serve his sentence.

=== Civil lawsuits ===
Survivors and their families have also filed multiple lawsuits, including against Smith & Wesson, the maker of the semiautomatic rifle used in the shooting, against Illinois State Police, and Crimo's father, Robert Crimo Jr.

== Perpetrator ==
Crimo lived in Lake County throughout his entire life. He attended Highland Park High School but dropped out before his junior year. At the age of 11, he began uploading music to the internet. He has performed under the stage name "Awake the Rapper" and posted his albums on Spotify, YouTube and Apple Music; music videos by him on YouTube depicted mass shootings and characters being shot by police. One video was accompanied by the narration "I need to just do it. It is my destiny." The account is no longer available.

Crimo frequently visited an online message board that discussed graphic depictions of death. He posted a video of a beheading the week before the shooting. He had his own Discord server, which was invaded by 4chan users after the shooting and has since been shut down. Stephen Harrison of Slate speculated he had used a single-purpose account on the English Wikipedia in an unsuccessful attempt to create an article about himself in 2017 and 2018. An account with the same username created articles about Crimo on the Fandom sites Wikitubia and the Rap Wiki.

A vocal supporter of then-former President Donald Trump, Crimo frequented far-right gatherings, often wearing Where's Waldo garb, and confrontationally joined counterprotests. Crimo "signed his name and Donald Trump's when he waived his right to trial."

Police records and people who knew Crimo indicate that he came from a middle class but troubled household. When Crimo was two, his mother Denise left him unattended on a hot August day inside a car with windows rolled up. She pleaded guilty to child endangerment and was ordered to undergo an evaluation at a child advocacy center. Between 2009 and 2014, police officers visited the Crimos' home nearly 20 times, nine of which involved reports of domestic violence. In 2010, Crimo's father, Robert Crimo, Jr. reported that his wife struck him with a screwdriver but later retracted the accusation. Officers recommended that the couple go through marriage counseling or separate. Crimo's parents no longer live together.

Law enforcement identified two prior encounters with Crimo: a 911 call in April 2019 reporting that he attempted to commit suicide and a September 2019 incident regarding alleged threats by Crimo to a family member. According to law enforcement, mental health professionals handled the suicide matter. In September 2019, police seized 16 knives, a dagger, and a sword from Crimo after a family member reported to the police that he planned to "kill everyone". Crimo's father said the weapons were his, however, and both parents denied Crimo had threatened anyone. He was not charged with a crime at the time, but a “clear and present danger report” was filed with the Illinois State Police. In December that year, Crimo applied for a Firearm Owner Identification card (FOID). It was sponsored by his father due to his young age. On either occasion, Highland Park police could have invoked Illinois' red flag law, which would have allowed them to seek a restraining order preventing Crimo from buying guns for up to six months. However, they did not pursue this option. Just four months later, in January 2020, Illinois State Police approved Crimo for a firearms permit, and he passed four background checks when buying firearms in 2020 and 2021. When asked why the "clear and present danger" report did not prevent Crimo from obtaining a FOID card, Illinois State Police said that Crimo denied that he would harm himself or others when questioned; moreover, "no one, including family, was willing to move forward on a complaint" or to provide pertinent information relating to threats or to mental health, any of which could have enabled further action by law enforcement.

His weapon that was used in the shooting was reportedly purchased online from another store in another state and then legally shipped to the Red Dot Arms store in Lake Villa for pickup.

=== Prison video calls ===
In 2023, a 38-second video of Crimo from a prison phone call at the Lake County Jail in Waukegan surfaced. In the video, Crimo claims the shooting was a "false flag operation". He also claims that his interview was a performance and he was tortured into falsifying evidence. The clip was filmed and posted by a woman who identifies herself as a "registered nurse, mental health advocate, and investigative journalist" on her conspiracy theory blog.

Earlier that year, Crimo's video call privileges were revoked after he allegedly made a prank call to a New York Post reporter, but his privileges were reinstated 30 days later.

=== Father ===
Crimo's father, 58-year-old Robert "Bob" Crimo Jr., who lived with his son, said that there had been "no warning signs" immediately before the shooting. He said he does not regret sponsoring his son for an Illinois FOID card that allowed his son to legally purchase weapons even after incidents that raised red flags with police. Crimo Jr. described the entire situation as a nightmare, saying the family is shocked at the behavior because he believes his son was raised with good morals. In an interview with the New York Post the day after the shooting, he denied any responsibility or feelings of guilt over how his son got the gun he used, and said that his son had talked about the 2022 Copenhagen mall shooting and the 22-year-old Danish suspect the night before allegedly launching his own massacre.

Crimo Jr. lived in Highwood throughout most of his life, and also had ties to both Highland Park and Buffalo Grove. He lived with his wife, Highland Park native Denise Pesina Crimo, who had a criminal history dating back as far as mid-2002. Police records from 2009 to 2014 showed a variety of domestic disputes between Crimo III's parents that included allegations of both verbal and physical abuse. In the 1980s and 1990s, Crimo Jr. served as the operator of a White Hen Pantry store in Highland Park, and in 2008, Crimo Jr. and his wife launched their own pantry and deli restaurant not far from the former White Hen Pantry. The location has since been closed following the shooting.

On December 16, 2022, Crimo Jr. was arrested without incident and charged with seven counts of reckless conduct in relation to the shooting. Lake County State's Attorney Eric Rinehart said that Crimo Jr. surrendered to Highwood Police; the charges are based on Crimo sponsoring his then-19-year-old son's application for a gun license in 2019. The following morning on December 17, Crimo Jr. was released on $50,000 bond. On February 16, 2023, Crimo Jr. entered a not-guilty plea to the charges involving the 2019 acquirement of his son's gun license. On November 6, he pleaded guilty to seven misdemeanor counts of reckless conduct as part of a plea deal. He was sentenced to 60 days in jail and two years of probation.

On November 15, ahead of his imprisonment, Crimo Jr. wore a white t-shirt to the Lake County courthouse with large black letters reading "I'm A Political Pawn" on the front and "LAWS, FACTS, REALITY." on the other side. Crimo Jr. turned the shirt inside out before he entered the courtroom; however, the judge threatened to hold Crimo Jr. in contempt of the court if he wore the shirt again, as the shirt was in violation of court decorum guidelines. Crimo Jr.'s lawyer, George Gomez, said he did not know the meaning of his client's t-shirt.

== Aftermath ==
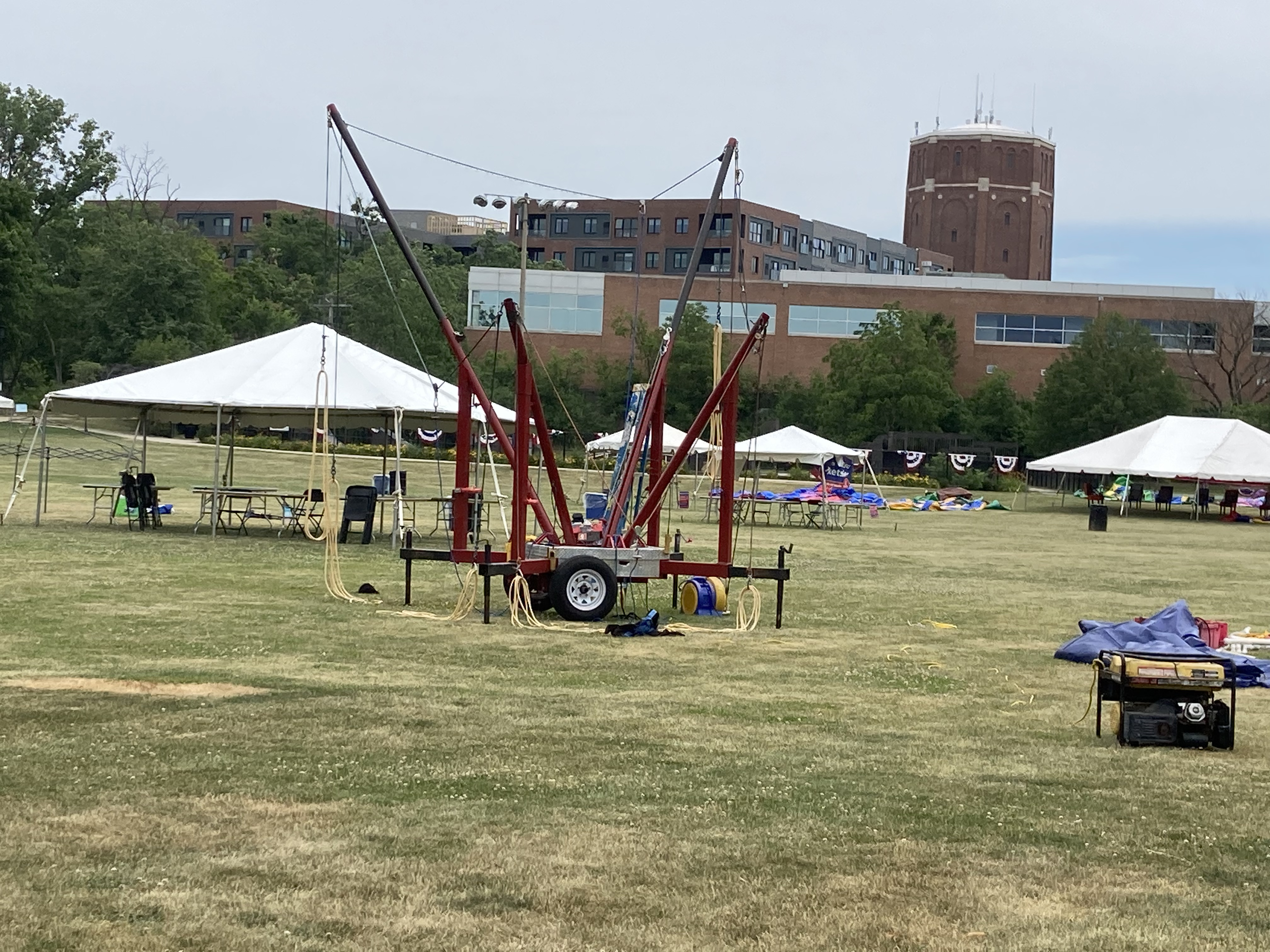
Highland Park fairgrounds after the shooting

Multiple Chicago suburbs canceled their Fourth of July celebrations after the shooting. Six Flags Great America in Gurnee continued operating but canceled its fireworks show. The Chicago White Sox announced they would continue to play their baseball game against the Minnesota Twins but canceled their fireworks show.

School districts in the surrounding neighborhoods said counseling service would be made available at Highland Park High School for "students, staff and community members."

The Ravinia Festival in Highland Park announced the cancellation of all concerts and events through July 10. "This decision was made after careful consideration and in close consultation with many stakeholders, including neighbors, public officials, artists, and patrons. Our shared hope is that the reduced activity—both within the park and in the neighborhoods surrounding Ravinia—will give the community the space and quiet to reflect and heal."

A GoFundMe campaign was established to benefit a two-year-old whose parents were both killed in the shooting. As of November 2023, over $3.2 million had been raised.

Members of the North Chicago Police Department were honored on July 18 for their role in capturing Crimo. The North Chicago City Council presented six officers and one detective with letters of commendation.

The Small Business Administration is offering low-interest loans to small businesses and nonprofits in Lake County, Cook County, McHenry County, and Kenosha County that may have suffered economic setbacks because of the shooting.

With the city's blessings, the Highland Park Community Foundation also offered grants to the victims and to nonprofit organizations helping those affected.

On June 20, 2023, Highland Park resident Billy Corgan, owner of the National Wrestling Alliance (NWA), announced that the NWA would run a charity show for the benefit of Cooper Roberts, the youngest person wounded by gunfire, and his twin brother Luke, injured in the ensuing panic. Doctors had determined that Cooper would need to use a wheelchair for the rest of his life, requiring the family home to be retrofitted. The show was held on July 8 at the Highland Park Recreation Center. Funds for the family were raised by VIP tickets, sponsorships, donations, and a raffle.

The shooting spurred the state of Illinois to introduce an "assault weapons ban" bill which was signed into law on January 10, 2023, expanding Highland Park's ban of assault weapons, which had existed since 2013, throughout the state. This bill also included magazine capacity restrictions for rifles (10 rounds) and handguns (15 rounds), alongside many other provisions. The bill allowed anyone who owned any weapon considered an assault weapon before the bill was passed to keep it but required them to register it with the Illinois State Police within 300 days of the bill being signed.

== Reactions ==
Crimo's parents released a statement through their attorney, stating, "We are all mothers and fathers, sisters and brothers, and this is a terrible tragedy for many families, the victims, the paradegoers, the community, and our own. Our hearts, thoughts, and prayers go out to everybody."

President Joe Biden stated that he was shocked by the "senseless" gun violence and has offered the "full support of the Federal government" to the affected communities. He also called for gun control measures. Vice President Kamala Harris made a similar statement.

Illinois governor J. B. Pritzker called the perpetrator a "monster" and stated that his office had made available all state resources to the community and was coordinating with local officials. He called for better gun control as well. Illinois U.S. Senator Dick Durbin called the attack "horrific" and "senseless". Gubernatorial candidate Darren Bailey advocated for "prayer and action to address rampant crime and mental health issues," calling the attack a "horrific tragedy". Bailey later apologized after saying, "...so let's pray for justice to prevail, and then let's move on and let's celebrate..." about 90 minutes after the shooting.

Highland Park Mayor Nancy Rotering said the community had been shaken to its core. Chicago mayor Lori Lightfoot released a statement about the shooting, calling it devastating and that she had been in contact with Mayor Rotering and offered the city's support with the Chicago Police Department providing assistance. She also stated the city grieved with the families of victims and the injured.

Illinois State Senator Julie Morrison and U.S. Representative Brad Schneider were in attendance and expressed their condolences. Morrison expressed a sentiment that she would never want to be in another parade. Schneider stated he and his campaign team were safe and highlighted his commitment to make the community a safer place.

=== Misinformation ===
Misinformation about the shooting spread on social media, including false claims that the shooter is transgender and that the shooting was a false flag operation. The websites The Daily Wire and Disclose.tv posted tweets emphasizing the shooter's clothing, which subsequently resulted in transphobic narratives spreading online.

== See also ==
- List of homicides in Illinois
- Waukesha Christmas parade attack (2021), a similar attack which targeted a holiday-themed parade
- List of mass shootings in the United States in 2022
