= Anna Langford =

American politician and lawyer

- Langford, 1971.

Chicago Alderman from the 16th Ward
- In office February 1983 – January 27, 1991
- Preceded by: Eloise Barden
- Succeeded by: Shirley Coleman
- In office February 23, 1971 – February 20, 1975
- Preceded by: Paul Sheridan
- Succeeded by: Eloise Barden

Personal details
- Born: Anna Riggs; October 27, 1917 Springfield, Ohio, U.S.
- Died: September 17, 2008 (aged 90) Chicago, Illinois, U.S.
- Party: Democratic Party
- Spouses: Antonio Fambro (m. 1936; div. 1939) Lawrence R. Langford Sr. (m. 1947; div. 1971)
- Children: 1
- Education: Hyde Park Academy High School; B.A. Roosevelt University; John Marshall Law School
- Occupation: Politician; lawyer

Anna R. Langford (née Riggs; October 27, 1917 – September 17, 2008) was an American politician, civil rights activist, and lawyer who served on the Chicago City Council in Chicago, Illinois. Langford became the first African American woman elected to the Chicago City Council in February 1971. She ultimately served three nonconsecutive terms on the council. Anna Langford died of lung cancer on September 17, 2008, at her home in the Englewood neighborhood of Chicago at the age of 90.

== Biography ==
=== Early life and education ===
Anna Langford was born in Springfield, Ohio, to an African-American father, Arthur J. Riggs Jr. and a white mother, Alice Reed. Both of her parents died when she was young. Her father passed when she was nine months old, and her mother when she was eight. The racial discrimination leading to her mother's death impacted Langford's life and her involvement with the Civil Rights Movement. Her mother, who was white, was taken to an Ohio hospital while suffering from appendicitis. However, when her children, including Anna, who were biracial, came to visit their sick mother, the hospital immediately ordered her transferred to another hospital for African Americans. Langford's mother suffered a burst appendix while en route to the second hospital and did not survive. After the passing of her mother, she was raised by her grandmother. Langford moved to Chicago, Illinois, at age thirteen to live with her aunt and uncle. She graduated from Hyde Park High School in 1935 and later Roosevelt University. She enrolled at John Marshall Law School and became a lawyer in 1956. As a black and female attorney she was refused office space in downtown Chicago and as a result set up a neighborhood practice in the Park Manor neighborhood of Chicago with already established criminal defense and family law attorneys Norman Robinson and Muriel Farmer to start the firm Robinson Farmer and Langford. She later opened her own practice at 1249 west 63rd in Englewood where she served a poor and diverse client group.

=== Career ===
Langford became intimately involved in the Civil Rights Movement, both within the Chicago Metropolitan Area and nationwide. She spent several weeks in rural Mississippi as a volunteer attorney at the office where three civil rights workers were kidnapped and murdered by suspected members of the KKK. Later Langford met with Martin Luther King Jr. in the living room of her home in 1966 to plan a march on Cicero, Illinois to promote racial integration within the suburb. Langford ran for a seat on the Chicago City Council in 1971 after losing in her first attempt four years earlier. On February 23, 1971, she won and became one of the first two female Chicago aldermen alongside Marilou Hedlund. She was elected to represent the 16th Ward, which at the time encompassed the Englewood neighborhood.

Langford was also a proponent of LGBT+ rights. In 1973 her, and only eight other alderman co-sponsored an anti-gay discrimination bill for housing and public accommodations. She also helped pass a Chicago gay rights ordinance in 1989.

Langford lost her re-election bid in 1975. In 1979, her first attempt to regain her old seat failed, but her second attempt, in 1983, succeeded. She was re-elected in 1987 and retired from her seat four years later. In the Chicago City Council reorganization of 1988, Anna Langford became Mayor Pro-Tempore of the council, a post she held from 1988 to 1991.

In the early 1980s, Langford challenged United States Congressman Harold Washington to run for Mayor of Chicago. She reportedly told Washington that she would run for mayor if he didn't, even going as far as having "Langford for Mayor" cards printed to pressure Washington into entering the race. Her persuasion worked; Washington ran for mayor and won in 1983. After Washington's fatal heart attack in 1987, Langford mediated between mayoral hopefuls Aldermen Eugene Sawyer and Timothy C. Evans. Langford ultimately backed Sawyer, who was elected mayor by the Chicago City Council. Langford supported Barack Obama's candidacy for President of the United States during her later life.

=== Marriage and Family ===
Langford was married twice, First to Jazz musician Antonio Fambro from 1936 until 1939. Langford was later married to Lawrence W. Langford from 1947 until divorcing in 1971. Together they had a son, Lawrence (Larry) Langford Jr., Langford family also included three grandchildren and one great-grandchild at the time of her death.

== Civic engagement ==
Langford was on the executive board of the League of Black Women.

She was a founding member of Operation Breadbasket which later was named Operation PUSH.

== Legacy ==
After her death, the Chicago Public Schools renamed Nicholas Copernicus Elementary located in the Englewood neighborhood in her honor, Anna R. Langford Community Academy in 2010.
