= Martin James Durkin =

First man to kill a U.S. federal agent

- Born: February 16, 1901; Sligo, County Sligo, Ireland
- Died: May 25, 1981 (aged 80); Terre Haute, Indiana, United States
- Occupation: Car thief
- Known for: Being the first person to kill a federal agent in the line of duty
- Status: Deceased
- Convictions: Federal; Interstate transportation of a stolen vehicle (7 counts); Illinois; Murder
- Penalty: Federal; 15 years imprisonment Illinois; 35 years imprisonment

Martin James Durkin (February 16, 1901 – May 25, 1981) was an Irish-American criminal and car thief. He is credited as the first man to kill a federal agent and was the subject of an intense manhunt by the Federal Bureau of Investigation. Personally led by J. Edgar Hoover, then recently appointed Director of the FBI, it was one of the first major investigations by the agency, who were led by Durkin on a three-month chase through five states before his capture in 1926.

== Biography ==
In late 1925, Durkin came under investigation by federal authorities for violation of the Dyer Act. A professional car thief, the 25-year-old was suspected of transporting stolen cars across state lines. On October 11, 1925, Durkin was followed to a Chicago garage by federal Special Agent Edwin C. Shanahan. When Shanahan approached the car Durkin was in he surprised him and Durkin shot him in the chest. The story received national attention since Shanahan was the first federal agent to be killed in the line of duty.

The reaction from the FBI was particularly aggressive and widely considered "a matter of pride and personal security" among virtually the entire agency. According to popular lore, FBI Director J. Edgar Hoover called an aide to his office after hearing news of Shanahan's death and said "We've got to get Durkin. If one man from the Bureau is killed, and the killer is permitted to get away, our agents will never be safe. We can't let him get away with it."

Hoover authorized one of the first and largest manhunts in the FBI's history, which stretched across the country and included several major cities. Durkin did not immediately flee Chicago and remained in the city until eventually traveling to California. Federal agents followed him to California, where he was involved in a San Diego car theft, and then to Arizona, New Mexico and Texas. In El Paso, Durkin was stopped by a local sheriff who noticed Durkin carrying a pistol. He was then traveling with his girlfriend in a stolen Cadillac but falsely claimed that he was a deputy sheriff from California and was passing through on vacation. The sheriff allowed Durkin to retrieve his police identification from a nearby hotel but they instead took the opportunity to escape by driving into the Texas desert.

The FBI soon arrived in El Paso, shortly after Durkin's abandoned car was found wrecked and partially buried in mesquite. Investigators found a rancher who recalled a man and woman who had shown up at his home and asked for a lift to the nearest town. He agreed to drive them to Girvin and remembered overhearing a conversation the couple had which suggested they planned to catch a train in Alpine, Texas, the seat in Brewster County.

Although only 50 miles away from the Mexican border, authorities believed that Durkin would remain in the United States and most likely arrange travel to a large metropolitan area. A railroad ticket agent in Alpine identified Durkin as the man who had bought railroad tickets from him to San Antonio and from there to St. Louis. Durkin had already boarded a train to St. Louis on January 20, 1926, and was scheduled to arrive in the city at 11:00 am that same day. Investigators immediately phoned the FBI office in Missouri to intercept him and, cooperating with St. Louis police, had the train stopped at a small town just outside the St. Louis city limits. With the station surrounded on all sides by open farmland, there was little chance for Durkin to escape, and the train was boarded by federal agents and police officers, who arrested the fugitive in his private compartment before he could reach for his guns.

Durkin confessed to the murder of Shanahan once in custody but, as killing an FBI agent was not yet a federal crime, he was tried and convicted by the state of Illinois for murder. The prosecution sought a death sentence, but Durkin was spared execution by the jury. Two jurors were in favor of death by hanging, three wanted a term ranging from 14 years to life in prison, and seven were in favor of a 40-year sentence. Eventually, the jury compromised with a 35-year sentence. Durkin was then tried in federal court on seven counts for violations of the Dyer Act. After being convicted on two separate trials and received 5-year sentences, on each count, Durkin pleaded guilty to the five remaining counts. He was sentenced to one year and one day in prison on each charge. All of his federal sentences were ordered to run consecutively to both each other and his state sentence.

Durkin served nearly 20 years at Stateville Prison. After being paroled on August 8, 1945, he was transferred to Leavenworth Federal Penitentiary where he remained until his parole on July 28, 1954. Durkin died in 1981.

== Elizabeth Grace Andrews ==
On October 28, 1925, at 11:13 p.m., Sergeant Harry Gray and his officers went to Lloyd Ervin Austin Sr.'s apartment and asked if they could wait inside for Durkin. Austin gave permission and the officers stationed themselves in the 2nd floor rear apartment and awaited Durkin's arrival.

In addition to the officers inside the apartment, several officers were stationed throughout the neighborhood. As Durkin arrived, accompanied by his girlfriend Elizabeth Grace "Betty" Andrews, Austin's niece, Sergeant Gray arrested him. However, a struggle between the two ensued. During the fight, Sergeant Michael Naughton pointed his shotgun at Durkin and as he pulled the trigger, Sergeant Gray fell against Durkin. His blast grazed Durkin’s left arm with the rest of the slugs going through a wall and into a closet where Austin was hiding. Austin was struck and mortally wounded. In retaliation for her uncle being shot, Betty Andrews produced a revolver and fired, fatally wounding Sergeant Gray. Durkin was also shot during the struggle, but was unhurt as he was wearing a bulletproof vest. Lloyd Austin was taken to a hospital where he died the next day. Sergeant Gray was taken to Mercy Hospital where his wife was already a patient. She sat at his bedside until he succumbed to his wounds five days later at 5:15 a.m. on November 2, 1925. Sergeant Gray’s last word were reported as, "O, if Naughton had only known how to use a shotgun, or if he had let me take it."

Betty Andrews, who was the star witness against Durkin at his murder trial, was never tried for killing Gray. She died of tuberculosis near Oak Forest, Illinois on April 24, 1932.
