= Tamms Correctional Center =

Former prison in Illinois, United States

- Interactive map of Tamms Correctional Center
- Location: Supermax Rd, Tamms, Illinois; 37°14′58″N 89°17′01″W
- Status: Closed
- Security class: Minimum - Supermax
- Capacity: 753
- Opened: 1998
- Closed: 2013
- Managed by: Illinois Department of Corrections

Tamms Correctional Center was an Illinois Department of Corrections prison located in Tamms, Illinois. Prior to its 2013 closure, the prison housed people in two sections: a 200-bed minimum security facility, opened in 1995, and a separate 500-bed supermax facility known as the Closed Maximum Security Unit ("CMAX"), opened in 1998.

Prior to the March 9, 2011 abolition of the death penalty in Illinois, the State of Illinois conducted executions by lethal injection in an execution chamber located within the CMAX section of Tamms Correctional Center. Andrew Kokoraleis, the last person to be executed in the state before Illinois suspended capital punishment, was executed at Tamms in 1999. He was the only inmate executed in Tamms death chamber.

Prior to Illinois Governor George Ryan's January 11, 2003 commutation of death row sentences, male death row inmates were housed at Menard, Pontiac, and Tamms correctional centers. After the commutations, only Pontiac continued to hold death row prisoners.

== History ==
During the 1990s, the construction of a supermax prison was proposed due to political concerns about increasing overcrowding and gang activity within Illinois correctional institutions. The State of Illinois bought the land for the prison from soybean farmers, and much of the money used to fund the purchase of the prison land, came from donations made by area residents hoping to have a prison built to increase economic activity. The donated money was counted to be over $225,000.

During its operation, Tamms housed prisoners primarily in long-term solitary confinement within the CMAX unit. The facility also contained Illinois’s only execution chamber, where lethal injections were carried out. Andrew Kokoraleis was executed in the prison in 1999, and was the only execution conducted at the site. During its operation Tamms operated at about 50% capacity. According to the state, this relatively low occupancy percentage reflected officials being selective about who was imprisoned there. Critics of the facility argued that it was built too large and costly.

As with other supermax prisons across the country, prison reformers consistently advocated for its closing. The Tamms Year Ten campaign was established in 2008 to push for reforms and closure of the prison. Brutal and inhumane conditions were reported by several Illinois newspapers, the American Civil Liberties Union, and reform advocates. A report by Illinois Department of Corrections validated the claims. In 2010, U.S. District Judge G. Patrick Murphy ruled that inmates must be allowed to challenge their transfer to Tamms at a formal hearing and wrote in his decision that "Tamms imposes drastic limitation on human contact, so much so as to inflict lasting psychological and emotional harm on inmates confined there for long periods."

During late February 2012, Illinois Governor Pat Quinn announced the planned closing of the Tamms Correctional Center due to budget cuts, triggering a political debate in the state about its future. Shortly thereafter The American Federation of State, County and Municipal Employees filed suit in Alexander County Circuit Court; this was temporarily effective in blocking the closure of the prison. On September 4, 2012, the judge in that matter, Charles Cavaness, granted a 30-day injunctive order preventing transfers outside of the prison. On September 6, 2012, the state appealed to the Illinois Fifth District Appellate Court. Justice Melissa A. Chapman delivered the opinion for the court, with Justices Thomas M. Welch and Stephen L. Spomer in concurrence, denying the state's appeal. On January 4, 2013 the prison officially closed and was left abandoned, following a nationwide trending decline of the usage of supermax prisons.
