= Pontiac Correctional Center =

Maximum security prison in Illinois, US

Coordinates: 40°51′58″N 88°38′17″W

- Interactive map of Pontiac Correctional Center
- Location: 700 W Lincoln Street Pontiac, Illinois
- Status: open
- Security class: Maximum
- Capacity: 2298
- Opened: 1871
- Managed by: Illinois Department of Corrections

Pontiac Correctional Center, established in June 1871, is an Illinois Department of Corrections maximum security prison (Level 1) for adult males in Pontiac, Illinois. The prison also has a medium security unit that houses medium to minimum security inmates and is classified as Level 3. Until the 2011 abolition of the death penalty in Illinois, the prison housed male death row inmates, but had no execution chamber. Inmates were executed at the Tamms Correctional Center. Although the capacity of the prison is 2172, it has an average daily population of approximately 2000 inmates.

In May 2008, Governor Rod Blagojevich proposed to shut down the Pontiac facility, with a phase-out plan to take place from January through February 2009. The inmate population would be transferred to the Thomson facility, a newly built maximum security prison, which is also equipped to house segregated inmates. Illinois has since sold Thomson to the Federal Bureau of Prisons. The Pontiac facility is one of the largest employers in the Livingston County community. Blagojevich's successor, Pat Quinn, cancelled plans to close Pontiac Correctional Center in March 2009 after taking office.

== History to 1931 ==
The prison was operated as a boys' reform school from 1872 to 1893. It was formally established as the State Reformatory for youths after that. Among its early detainees was Charles Hair, a Cherokee convicted at age 12 of intent to assault an officer, as he was picked up in an armed raid by law offices in November 1892 raid at the fort of Ned Christie, also Cherokee. Christie had been declared an outlaw after being wrongly accused of killing a federal marshal in 1887, and was killed in the raid. Hair was held in Illinois for three years.

When the prison was expanded to house an adult population, the buildings of the former reform school were used as the administrative offices. Two cell houses were constructed. One was a 4-tier cell house holding 296 cells, each of which measured 8'3" x 7' x 8'. The other was 5 tiers, housing 500 cells measuring 8'x 5'x 8'. The cells had iron bars in the front and contained a cot or spring bed, a stool and locker.

In 1929, there were 1,405 inmates and 57 guards, making the ratio approximately 1 guard to 25 inmates. In 1931, an additional cell house with 440 cells on 5 tiers was built. In this cell house, two men were assigned to each 8'x10'x8' cell, sharing a bunk bed, a cabinet, a desk, and outlet for a radio. With the new cell houses, the prison population grew to 2,504 inmates with 150 guards, or approximately 1 guard per 17 inmates. The prison housed 2,504 inmates (1,959 white, 535 black, 10 other).

=== Rules and regulations ===
The inmates were allowed to smoke in their cells at specified times. Relatives were allowed to visit once a month on any day except Saturday afternoons, Sundays, and holidays. Twice a month, inmates were allowed to write letters: one to a friend and one to a parent. A married prisoner was permitted to write every week. The inmates could buy tobacco, candy and toiletries weekly and could receive newspapers and magazines from the publisher.

=== Punishments ===
The loss of prisoner privileges for periods of 10 to 30 days was the most common type of punishment. Inmates were put in certain confinement cells with nothing but a slice of bread to eat every morning for 3 to 8 days, for worse violations.

In the 21st century, inmates are disciplined in many forms for known violations of laws or rules of the institution or department, for which they receive tickets. They may be restricted in yard time, from using audio visual items, or from purchasing items at the commissary. Inmates may also be put on a 72-hour property restrictions, confined to their cells, for instances such as having unauthorized materials or contraband, or assaulting staff or other inmates.

Allegations of a "three-man team" being assembled by an officer at PCC, to punish, abuse and cover-up abuse of inmates was reported in 2022 by Criminal.

== Riots ==
On April 23, 1973, a brawl broke out at Pontiac involving 100 inmates using homemade knives, cleaning utensils, and metal trays as weapons in the mess hall. By the time guards fired tear gas to suppress the violence, two inmates had been stabbed and killed. According to Time Magazine, this fight had been sparked by competition among members of rival Chicago gangs who were imprisoned.

On July 22, 1978, a riot erupted that involved more than 1,000 inmates and resulted in one of the deadliest riots in Illinois prison history. The riot began around 9:45 in the morning, when 600 prisoners were returning to the cell house on the north end of the prison from the recreational yard. Armed with shanks, prisoners attacked officers inside the cell house. According to investigators, prison gangs directed the attack to challenge Warden Thaddeus Pinkney. Soon the local and state police arrived and fired eight rounds of tear gas into the prison yard. Prisoners set buildings on fire, causing other prisoners to get involved. After many hours, the troops got all inmates back into their cells. Lieutenant William Thomas and two correctional officers, Robert Conkle and Stanley Cole, were killed; three correctional officers, Danny Dill, Dale Walker and Sharon Pachet, were injured.

The warden put a "deadlock" system into effect until October 16, 1978. Prisoners were not allowed to leave their cells for any reason. Their meals were brought to them; all recreational time and work assignments were cancelled. The prisoners were not allowed to shower until October. Family visits were banned until October 14, and they were not allowed to make phone calls to their families until September 30. The officials of the prison began a renewed search of prisoners for weapons on October 2 and ended October 13.

The prisoners filed a complaint in the district court on August 31 stating the "deadlock" was longer than was needed to restore order and was having adverse effects on the prisoners' mental and physical health. The district judge decided to wait until after the "shakedown" of weapons search to make any decisions. After the shakedown, on November 3, the court ordered Pontiac Correctional Center to restore the family visitation hours and phone privileges as they were before the riot, as well as the meals, exercise and work times. The court also required the prison to provide two hours of yard recreation a week to the prisoners.

Because of this riot, the prison instituted a policy of moving only a few inmates at a time in a line. As 1997, prisoners in the maximum security unit are kept in their cell 24 hours a day, with exception of days when they are allowed limited time for yard recreation, use of the law library, showers, and visits.

By 2008, a general population of prisoners had been reintroduced to Pontiac Correctional Center. Inmates who are not in segregation status are given more time out of their cells, including social time on rec yards, in the gym, and at dining times. Protective custody and inmates from the medium-security unit may obtain jobs within the prison, ranging from cellhouse porter to lawn care or vehicle maintenance. In addition, inmates of all confinement statuses may participate in mental health and medical "groups". Church services are held at the center, and the protective custody unit has its own inmate choir.

== Recent assaults ==
In January 2013, an officer working in the Protective Custody unit of Pontiac CC was attacked and severely injured by an inmate; the officer was hospitalized. The inmate was convicted on charges of aggravated battery and sentenced to 20 years in state prison. This sentence is running concurrent to the 85-year sentence which the inmate had earlier received for armed robbery and murder in Cook County.

In March 2015, officers received a tip that an inmate in the North Cellhouse had a homemade weapon in his cell and had threatened to use it against staff. The prison's Tactical Team was mobilized after the inmate refused to comply with orders to put on restraints for a cell search. When the team entered the cell and attempted to restrain the inmate, he stabbed 3 officers multiple times on the hands, arms, and legs. The officers were treated at an outside hospital for non-life-threatening injuries.

In the summer of 2016, an officer was escorting an inmate to a new cell in the East Cellhouse. The inmate had just been released from segregation status to general population. When the officer went to key open the cell door to let the inmate in, the inmate attacked him, punching him in the face. Tower officers alerted other staff, who subdued the inmate. The officer was transported to a local hospital and treated for his injuries.

On August 21, 2016, an inmate punched a correctional lieutenant, starting a fight that involved six employees and five inmates. It resulted in four correctional officers (2 male, 2 female) and two lieutenants (1 female, 1 male) being treated for injuries, including possible concussions. According to Joe Lewis, a correctional officer and union official at the Pontiac facility, other inmate violence against employees was occurring. He said that the prison administration was ignoring policies to keep workers safe, or substituting ineffective practices.

Illinois Department of Corrections spokeswoman Nicole Wilson disputed Lewis's statement, saying

The events that led to this incident do not appear to be the result of a lack of policy or a breakdown in existing policies but rather a failure to follow workplace safety procedures already in place, DOC's investigation will include why procedures weren't followed and how future incidents can be prevented.

Both the staff and AFSCME (employees' union) denied that employees had violated any procedure. The IDOC and the Governors office had not identified the policy that was violated. As of January 2017, the last of the injured staff members returned to work. The inmates involved were successful in getting in-house department discipline dismissed. The Livingston County State's attorney is pursuing criminal charges against the inmates involved. Those inmates will begin arrangements in March 2017.

On February 12, 2017, less than 16 hours after the assault noted above, an inmate stabbed an officer in the side of the head/temple area in Property. The institution had been placed on a level 4 lockdown following the previous night's incident. Staff had been ordered to continue some normal movement, which included moving inmates to and from the property building to prepare for transfers. When the general population inmates were packing out, one inmate took the opportunity to stab an officer in the side of the head. The injured officer along with his lieutenant and two other officers managed to subdue the inmate while an emergency code was called. Responding staff removed both the inmate and the injured officer from the area. The officer was treated and released from a local hospital. Following this incident, the facility was placed on a Level One Lockdown.

== Proposed prison closing ==
In May 2008 the governor of Illinois, Rod Blagojevich, announced his intention to close Pontiac CC by February 2009 and to move about half the inmates to a prison in Thomson, Illinois. Many residents of Pontiac opposed the plan, fearing "570 jobs in this central Illinois town would be lost." The prison is the second-largest employer in Livingston County. Citizens gathered together to hold rallies seeking the support of the governor. On September 15 a joint meeting in Chicago and Springfield was held on the issue, for voting by the Commission on Government Forecasting and Accountability. At this meeting 9 of 12 people voted to keep the prison open. While Governor Blagojevich would have made the final decision, he would have taken this vote into consideration.

On September 16 employees of Pontiac Correctional Center filed a lawsuit stating "the state does not have a right to close the facility because it has budgeted money to run the prison through June 2009." Further, they said that "Gov. Rod Blagojevich and the Illinois Department of Corrections cannot close the prison because funding was provided in the 2008–09 budget, which was passed by the Illinois General Assembly and signed into law by Blagojevich." On September 17, an independent commission of state lawmakers rejected closing the prison, despite the claims by the Department of Corrections that such action would save money in the next year's budget. Pat Quinn, lieutenant governor of Illinois since 2003, assumed the governorship in January 2009 after Blagojevich was impeached for corruption charges. (He was later convicted and imprisoned.) On March 12, 2009, Governor Quinn cancelled plans to close Pontiac Correctional Center.

In 2020, Governor JB Pritzker proposed the closure of the prison. Plans were finalized in early 2022, allowing the prison to remain open, while permanently closing the medium-security unit.

== Units ==
=== Medium-Security Unit ===
This unit, commonly referred to as "the farm," was once a working farm that cultivated crops and raised livestock to produce much of the food consumed by the prison. This unit is classified as Level 3 and houses offenders that are medium- to minimum-security inmates. Unit population as of 1/1/2021 was 327.

=== Maximum-Security Unit ===
This unit is classified as Level 1. It contains offenders who need to be segregated and are limited in their privileges.

The maximum security unit also houses maximum-security inmates in General Population status, and high-aggression protective-custody inmates. Population as of January 2021 was 738.

==== North Condemned/Administrative Detention ====
Until the abolition of the death penalty in Illinois in 2011, this unit housed death row inmates. This unit has been renamed as North Administrative Detention. It now houses inmates who are believed to be gang chiefs and too much of security risks to be housed in the general population.

==== North Segregation ====
This unit is the state's main Segregation housing unit for high-aggression inmates who have broken facility rules. Such violations include assaulting staff or inmates, possessing contraband, escape attempts, etc.

==== East Cell House ====
This unit holds many different classifications of inmates, including Segregation Release, and Protective Custody.

==== South Protective Custody Unit ====
The state's primary Protective Custody Unit. Some of these inmates are former death row offenders. The unit houses between 300 and 400 inmates.

==== South Mental Health Unit ====
This unit provides psychiatric and psychological mental health services for offenders who are sentenced to be within the correctional system for a longer period of time and have a segregated status. These offenders are diagnosed as chronically mentally ill; diagnoses of the inmates have included schizophrenia, psychotic, and bipolar or major affective disorder. Population as of January 2021 is 66.

==== West Cell House ====
This unit is general population

== Notable inmates ==
| Inmate Name | Register Number | Status | Details |
|---|---|---|---|
| Brian Dugan | A60862 | Serving 3 life sentences without parole plus 175 years. | Originally convicted of murdering two people in the 1980s. In 2009, he was sentenced to death for a third murder, which was automatically changed to life when Illinois abolished the death penalty in 2011. |
| Timothy Krajcir | C96201 | Serving 13 life terms without parole. | Serial killer who murdered 9 women in the 1970s–1980s. |
| Paul Runge | N84715 | Serving a life sentence. | Serial killer who murdered at least 7 people between 1995 and 1997. |

- Larry Eyler – American serial killer and abductor
- Richard Holman – American serial killer. His older accomplice Girvies Davis was executed in 1995. Holman avoided execution since he was a month shy of 18.
- John David Norman – pedophile, sex offender and sex trafficker
- Drew Peterson – police sergeant and convicted murderer
- Cory Gregory - Murdered Adrianna Reynolds with help from Sarah Kolb. Gregory and Kolb then attempted to burn Adrianna's body. When that failed, they enlisted the help of a friend, Nathan Gaudet, to dismember the body using a handsaw and then buried her in Blackhawk State Park. Sentenced to 45 total years. Gregory has transitioned to a female while incarcerated.
