= Capital punishment in Illinois =

Capital punishment has been repealed in the U.S. state of Illinois since 2011.

== History ==
Illinois used death by hanging as a form of execution until 1928. The last person executed by this method was the public execution of Charles Birger the same year. After being struck down by Furman v. Georgia in 1972, capital punishment was reinstated in Illinois on July 1, 1974, but voided by the Supreme Court of Illinois in 1975. Illinois officially reinstated capital punishment on July 1, 1977. On September 8, 1983, the state adopted lethal injection as the default method of execution in Illinois, but the electric chair remained operational to replace lethal injection if needed.

On May 10, 1994, the state executed serial killer John Wayne Gacy by lethal injection, who sexually assaulted, tortured and murdered at least 33 teenage boys and young men between 1972 and 1978 in Cook County (a part of metropolitan Chicago). The last man executed in Illinois was Ripper Crew member Andrew Kokoraleis on March 17, 1999. Another man condemned in Illinois, Alton Coleman, was executed in Ohio.

== Blanket clemency and abolition ==
On January 11, 2003, Republican Governor George Ryan blanket-commuted the sentences of all the 167 inmates condemned to death, and pardoned four of them, a gesture that his opponents attribute to the fact that he was rendered ineligible by his unpopularity and charged with conspiracy, racketeering, and fraud.

Democratic Governor Pat Quinn signed legislation on March 9, 2011, to abolish the death penalty in Illinois effective July 1, 2011, and commuted the death sentences of the fifteen inmates on Illinois' death row to life imprisonment. Quinn was criticized for signing the bill after saying that he supported the death penalty during the 2010 gubernatorial campaign, after which he defeated the Republican candidate with 46.8% of the vote.

In 2018, then Republican Governor Bruce Rauner called for the reintroduction of the death penalty for those convicted of killing police officers. This was opposed by state lawmakers and Rauner was subsequently defeated by Democrat J. B. Pritzker.

== See also ==
- List of people executed in Illinois
- Crime in Illinois
- Law of Illinois
