= Chicago (disambiguation) =

Chicago, Illinois, is the third-most populous city in the United States.

Chicago may also refer to:

== Places ==
=== United States ===
- New Chicago, California, an unincorporated community formerly known as "Chicago" in Amador County
- Port Chicago, California, a former town and naval station in Contra Costa County
- Chicago River, a river in Chicago, Illinois
- Lake Chicago, a prehistoric lake from the Wisconsin Glacial Period
- Chicago, Kansas, a formerly populated community
- Little Chicago, Minnesota, an unincorporated community in Rice County

=== Zimbabwe ===
- Chicago, Zimbabwe, a suburb of Kwekwe

== Culture and the arts ==
=== Music ===
==== Songs ====
- "Chicago" (Graham Nash song), 1970
- "Chicago" (Michael Jackson song), also known as "She Was Lovin' Me"
- "Chicago song", a song on David Sanborn's A Change of Heart, 1987
- "Chicago" (Sufjan Stevens song), 2005
- "Chicago" (That Toddlin' Town), a 1922 song by Fred Fisher
- "Chicago", a 1977 single by Kiki Dee
- "Chicago", a song by Groove Armada from the 1999 album Vertigo
- "Chicago", a song by Hieroglyphics from the 2003 album Full Circle
- "Chicago", a song by Kate Voegele from the 2007 album Don't Look Away
- "Chicago", a song by The Devil Wears Prada from the 2011 album Dead Throne
- "Chicago", a song by Tom Waits from the 2011 album Bad as Me
- "Chicago", a song by Louis Tomlinson from the 2022 album Faith in the Future

==== Other uses in music ====
- Chicago (band), a jazz rock band founded in 1967
  - Chicago (album), 1970
- Chicago house, a genre of electronic dance music

=== Theatre, film and television ===
- Chicago (play), 1926, written by Maurine Dallas Watkins
  - Chicago (1927 film), based on the 1926 play
  - Chicago (musical), first performed in 1975, based on the above play
    - Chicago (original Broadway cast recording), a 1975 album containing a recording of the above musical
    - Chicago (1996 Broadway revival cast recording), a 1997 album
    - Chicago (2002 film), based on the above musical
      - Chicago (soundtrack), the soundtrack to the above film
- "Chicago" (Prison Break), a 2007 TV episode
- Chicago, a 1965 play by Sam Shepard
- Chicago (franchise), a group of NBC television dramas set in the Illinois city

=== Literature ===
- Chicago (magazine), a lifestyle periodical about the Illinois city
- Chicago (manga), by Yumi Tamura
- Chicago (novel), by Egyptian author Alaa-Al-Aswany
- "Chicago" (poem), by Carl Sandburg
- The Chicago Manual of Style, for American English

== Games ==
- Chicago (bridge card game), a form of contract bridge
- Chicago (poker card game), a Swedish poker game (or any one of several stud poker variants, including "Chicago", "Big Chicago", and "Little Chicago")
- Chicago (pool), a "money ball" pool gambling game
- Chicago 90, a 1989 video game by Microïds
- Chicago, a dice game similar or synonymous to Farkle

== People ==
- Judy Chicago (born 1939), American feminist artist

== Science and technology ==
- 334 Chicago, a large main-belt asteroid found in 1892
- Chicago (typeface), a classic Apple Macintosh font
- Chicago Convention on International Civil Aviation, a 1944 agreement
- Chicago Pile-1, the world's first nuclear reactor
- Windows Chicago, the code name for Windows 95

== Schools of thought ==
- Chicago school (architecture)
- Chicago school (literary criticism)
- Chicago school (sociology)
- Chicago school of economics

== Sports ==
=== Current teams ===
- Chicago Bears, a professional American football team of the NFL's National Football Conference, Northern Division
- Chicago Blackhawks, a professional ice hockey team of the NHL's Western Conference, Central Division
- Chicago Bulls, a professional basketball team of the NBA's Eastern Conference, Central Division
- Chicago Cubs, a professional baseball team of the MLB's National League, Central Division
- Chicago Dogs, an independent professional baseball team based in Rosemont, Illinois
- Chicago Fire Soccer Club, a professional soccer team in the MLS' Eastern Conference based in the suburb of Bridgeview
- Chicago Stars FC, a professional soccer team in the National Women's Soccer League, based in the suburb of Bridgeview
- Chicago Sky, a professional basketball team of the WNBA's Eastern Conference
- Chicago White Sox, a professional baseball team of MLB's American League, Central Division
- Chicago Wolves, a professional ice hockey team of the American Hockey League's Western Conference, Central Division and affiliate of the NHL's St. Louis Blues
- Club Atlético Nueva Chicago, an Argentine football (soccer) club from Mataderos, Buenos Aires
  - Estadio Nueva Chicago

=== Former teams ===
- Chicago Blitz, a professional American football team of the United States Football League (1982–1984)
- Chicago Boosters, an Independent American football team which played in one APFA game (1920–21)
- Chicago Bruisers, a professional arena football team and charter member of the Arena Football League (1987–1989)
- Chicago Bulls (AFL, 1926), a professional American football team
- Chicago Cardinals, a professional American football team
- Chicago Cardinals (ice hockey), a professional team in the American Hockey Association (1926–1927)
- Chicago Indians, an American football team of the former minor American Football League (1938–39)
- Chicago Packers/Chicago Zephyrs, a professional basketball team of the National Basketball Association (1961–1963), now the Washington Wizards
- Chicago Rockets ("Chicago Hornets" in 1949), a professional American football team of the All-America Football Conference (1946–1949)
- Chicago Rush, a professional arena football team of the Arena Football League (2001–2013)
- Chicago Shamrocks, a professional ice hockey team in the American Hockey Association (1930–1932)
- Chicago Stags, a professional basketball team of the National Basketball Association (1946–1950)
- Chicago Sting, an American professional NASL soccer team (1974–1988)

== Transportation ==
- USS Chicago, any of several U.S. Navy vessels
- Chicago (aircraft), a plane used in the first successful air circumnavigation of the globe
- Chicago (CTA), Chicago Transit Authority
  - Chicago station (CTA Blue Line), or Chicago and Milwaukee
  - Chicago station (CTA Brown and Purple Lines), or Chicago and Franklin
  - Chicago station (CTA Red Line), or Chicago and State
- City of Chicago (train), a passenger train
- Chicago Tunnel Company, a former narrow-gauge freight network under downtown Chicago

== See also ==
- Chicago Park, California, an unincorporated community in Nevada County
- Chicago Heights, Illinois, Cook County
- Chicago Ridge, Illinois, Cook County
- North Chicago, Illinois, Lake County
- South Chicago Heights, Illinois, Cook County
- West Chicago, Illinois, DuPage County
- East Chicago, Indiana, a city
- New Chicago, Indiana, a town
- Chicago Junction, Ohio, former name of Willard, Ohio
- Little Chicago, Minnesota, an unincorporated community
- Chicago Corners, Wisconsin, an unincorporated community
- Chicago Junction, Wisconsin, an unincorporated community
- Little Chicago, Wisconsin, an unincorporated community
- "My Kind of Town", a song sometimes mistakenly referred to as "Chicago"
- Chicago shooting (disambiguation)
- Chicagoland (disambiguation)
- Chicago Avenue (disambiguation)
