= Murder of Ella French =

2021 murder in Chicago, Illinois

- Date: August 7, 2021
- Time: Between 9 and 10pm (CDT)
- Location: West Englewood, Chicago, Illinois, U.S.; 41°46′45.16″N 87°40′47.55″W
- Type: Shooting
- Perpetrator: Emonte Morgan
- Deaths: Ella French
- Injuries: Carlos Yañez Jr. - Gunshot wounds; lost right eye, permanent blindness in left eye, limp; Emonte Morgan - Gunshot wounds; Shot in the abdomen
- Arrests: Emonte Morgan, Eric Morgan and Jamel Danzy
- Charges: List: Emonte Morgan - First degree murder, attempted murder of a peace officer and possession/use of a firearm as a felon; Eric Morgan - Obstruction of justice, unlawful use of a weapon and unlawful use of a weapon by a felon; Jamel Danzy - Conspiracy to violate federal firearm laws, knowingly transferring and giving a firearm to an out-of-state resident, knowingly making a false written statement to acquire a firearm and knowingly disposing of a firearm to a convicted felon
- Verdict: Emonte Morgan was tried by a jury and found guilty, Eric Morgan and Jamel Danzy both plead guilty
- Sentence: Emonte Morgan - Life sentence, with an additional 57 years imprisonment; Eric Morgan - Seven years imprisonment; Jamel Danzy - Two and a half years imprisonment

On the evening of August 7, 2021, Ella French, a police officer with the Chicago Police Department, was fatally shot while conducting a traffic stop in the West Englewood community area in Chicago, Illinois.

After pulling over a gray Honda CRV for an expired license plate, officers French, Carlos Yañez Jr. and Joshua Blas walked up to the vehicle, speaking with the three occupants. During the course of the stop, a struggle ensued between the rear passenger, Emonte Morgan, and officers French and Yañez, resulting in the death of French, the serious injury of Yañez and the shooting of Blas.

French was the first female CPD officer to die in the line of duty since the shooting of Officer Irma Ruiz on September 22, 1988.

== Background ==
French joined the Chicago Police Department (CPD) in 2018 after working for the Cook County Sheriff's Office (CCSO). She was assigned to the 10th district, but requested to be transferred to the Community Safety Team. She was later described by The Blue Magazine as being a "bright, charismatic young woman".

One of her partners at the time of the shooting, Officer Carlos Yañez Jr., had been working for the CPD since August, 2014.

As of August 9, 2021, over 2,100 people had been shot in Chicago, an increase of 12% when compared to the same time frame in 2020; there had also been a 2% increase in homicides, with 464 recorded in 2020 and 474 recorded in 2021. CPD had also made more firearms seizures, confiscating 7,536 firearms, an increase of 23% when compared to the same time frame in 2020.

Then CPD Superintendent David Brown stated during a press conference hosted on August 13, 2021, that the two men involved in the shooting, Emonte and Eric Morgan, "[did not] have extensive criminal backgrounds".

== Shootings ==
On the evening of August 7, 2021, French, Yañez and Officer Joshua Blas pulled over a gray Honda CRV for an expired license plate near 63rd Street and Bell Avenue in West Englewood. Inside the car was the driver, Eric, and two passengers; his brother, Emonte, who was on the back seat, and an unidentified female (later identified as Eric's then-girlfriend) on the front passenger seat.

Footage from French's bodycam showed her begin speaking with Eric, while Yañez and Blas spoke with Emonte and the unidentified female. After Yañez spotted an open bottle of alcohol in the vehicle, all three were asked to exit the vehicle.

When French asked Eric to give her his car keys and exit the vehicle, he complied, but as Emonte exited the vehicle he was still holding a drink and his phone in his hands. Despite repeated requests from Yañez to put them down, Emonte refused. Yañez tried to grab his arm, but Emonte pushed him away, moving to the back of the vehicle and resulting in a struggle. As this was happening, Eric attempted to flee, with Blas chasing after him. The struggle moved to the front passenger side of the vehicle, and as French came around the back of the vehicle to assist Yañez, Emonte pulled a .22 calibre Glock from his waistband and shot at her, with French falling to the ground. Emonte then turned the pistol on Yañez, firing several times before fleeing.

After hearing gunfire, Blas stopped chasing Eric and returned to the squad car to try and help French and Yañez. After Blas returned to the squad car, Emonte opened fire on him, knocking him to the ground. Blas returned fire, hitting Emonte in the abdomen. Emonte fled, after which Blas tried to tend to French and Yañez. At some point, Emonte and Eric met up, with Emonte passing the pistol to Eric.

Bystanders later stated that Eric had jumped a fence into their garden to escape while they were having a barbecue. Upon seeing them, he turned as if to climb over the fence again, but after seeing the police he returned. He pointed the pistol at the host of the barbecue, but the host and two other men were able to detain him until police could take over. Emonte was also found a short time later lying on the ground near the site of the shooting and was transported to Advocate Christ Medical Center in Oak Lawn.

French was shot in the back of the head, while Yañez was shot five times, twice in the head, causing him to lose his right eye, once in his neck and once in his shoulder. Both French and Yañez were transported by responding officers in squad cars to the University of Chicago Medical Center, where French was pronounced dead. It was later said that the decision of officers to transport them immediately instead of waiting for an ambulance likely saved Yañez's life. French was the first female CPD officer to be killed in the line of duty since the shooting of Officer Irma Ruiz at Moses Montefiore Academy during the 1988 Chicago shootings on September 22, 1988.

== Aftermath ==
=== Ella French ===
Impact statement from Elizabeth French, Ella French's mother, during the trial of Emonte Morgan

Your choice was to become the murderer of my daughter, and with choices come consequences. I hope that yours will be life in prison. But what does that mean? It means you will have your life something you took away from Ella. Your mother can still tell you she loves you—something I can never do again.

A vigil was held at both the site of the shooting and at the hospital where the two officers were taken, with dozens of CPD and CCSO officers in attendance. The streets near the hospital were "lined" with squad cars. The day after the shooting, dozens of officers standing at attention lined the street outside of the Cook County medical examiner's office as the procession transporting French's body moved slowly towards the office. As the ambulance transporting French, Chicago Fire Department Ambulance 36, moved past, the officers saluted it.

A memorial service was hosted for French on August 17 outside of the 10th district's Ogden precinct. A public visitation took place the following day at St. Rita of Cascia Shrine Temple, which was attended by "thousands of officers", with a private burial taking place on August 19.

A week before the second anniversary of her death, the CPD Mounted Unit named a new horse after her, a tradition in the department so as to "carr[y] on the legacies of those who have died while serving the city of Chicago".

In 2023, Allan Reich, a local business leader who is on the board of the Chicago Police Foundation, was "moved" by French's story and wished to create a way for young people to learn about her and to "ensure her legacy and that of fellow fallen Chicago officers who died in the line of duty" would be remembered. Alongside her mother, Elizabeth French, the Chicago Police Foundation created the Ella French Scholarship. In its first year, the scholarship had $30,000, with the expectation that the fund would grow every year. Those selected would be provided with $2,000 to be put towards high school expenses.

In 2024, Elizabeth French helped to launch Light the Line, a service aimed at helping officers to "handle the pressures of doing their job".

On August 31, 2025, a statue of French was unveiled in Garfield Ridge at a dog park named for French.

=== Carlos Yañez Jr. ===
Impact statement from Carlos Yañez Jr. during the trial of Emonte Morgan

I would like to tell you, you have taken so much that night. You killed Ella French and left me for dead. I was bleeding on the curb as you stood over our bodies, I'm here before you today to say you will not take any more. I will continue to fight everyday like I did that horrific night. I will never forgive you and I don't care what excuses you have. You fucked up that night and took so much away.

A GoFundMe page was started by Nicole Yañez, Carlos Yañez's sister, and Evelyn Gamboa, his sister-in-law. It was set up in anticipation of the medical bills for both Carlos Yañez and his son, Carlos III, who was born with a condition that required multiple cranial surgeries and ongoing therapy. Within three days it had raised almost $170,000 with a goal of reaching $250,000. By 23 August, it had raised over $300,000.

He was moved from hospital to the Shirley Ryan AbilityLab in late August, 2021, from which he was discharged on October 14, 2021. Despite being told he would likely be permanently paralyzed on his left side, he made a recovery, though as of September 2024 he was still suffering from partial blindness in his left eye and a limp as of September 2024.

Speaking in May, 2022, on the letters he had received, he said that they had helped him to recover, and that he had received letters from people "living as far away as Britain and Australia".

=== Emonte Morgan ===
Emonte was charged with first-degree murder and attempted first degree murder, unlawful use of a weapon and unlawful use of a weapon by a felon on August 11, 2021. He did not testify in his trial and no witnesses were called. Eric's ex-girlfriend testified against Emonte. In March 2024, after three and a half hours of deliberation, a jury found Emonte guilty of first degree murder, attempted murder of a peace officer and possession/use of a firearm as a felon. He was sentenced on September 11 that year to life imprisonment without parole, the statutory minimum for the murder, with an additional 57 years for the attempted murder of Yañez and the possession/use of a firearm as a felon.

=== Eric Morgan ===
Eric was charged with obstruction of justice, unlawful use of a weapon and unlawful use of a weapon by a felon. He took a plea deal for his cooperation, pleading guilty to aggravated unlawful use of a weapon, battery and obstruction of justice on October 12, 2023. He was sentenced to seven years imprisonment, to be served concurrently with two separate charges amounting to seven years. As of September 2024, he was serving his sentence in Pinckneyville Correctional Center, with the ability to request parole being expected in June 2026.

=== Jamel Danzy ===
The pistol used by Emonte was supplied by Jamel Danzy in an illegal straw purchase, which is where a separate individual purchases something for someone who is either unwilling or, in Emonte's case, unable to purchase for themself. He bought the pistol in March 2021 from a licensed dealer in Hammond, Indiana. He was charged with conspiracy to violate federal firearm laws, knowingly transferring and giving a firearm to an out-of-state resident, knowingly making a false written statement to acquire a firearm and knowingly disposing of a firearm to a convicted felon, later pleading guilty to federal firearms conspiracy on July 27, 2022. He was sentenced on December 14, 2022, to two and a half years imprisonment.

=== Anjanette Young ===
Anjanette Young, who was the victim of a wrongful police raid in Chicago in 2019, praised Ella French as the only police officer to treat her with dignity.
