= Chicago shooting =

Chicago shooting may refer to:

- 1929 Saint Valentine's Day Massacre
- 1937 Memorial Day massacre
- 1988 Chicago shootings
- 1999 Independence Day weekend shootings, one of which occurred in Chicago
- 2003 Chicago warehouse shooting
- 2012 killing of Rekia Boyd
- 2014 murder of Laquan McDonald
- 2016 killing of Paul O'Neal
- 2018 Mercy Hospital shooting
- 2021 killing of Adam Toledo
- 2021 killing of Anthony Alvarez
- 2021 killing of Zheng Shaoxiong
- 2022 Magnificent Mile shooting

== See also ==
- Crime in Chicago
- List of mass shootings in the United States
