= Lynching of William Johnson =

The lynching of William Johnson occurred at Thebes, Illinois, on April 26, 1903. Johnson, a black man, had been accused of raping a 10-year-old white girl. He was apprehended by a mob of farmers and hanged.

== History ==
William Johnson was an African American man who lived in a work camp for erecting the Thebes Bridge in Thebes, Illinois, over the Mississippi River. In late April 1903, Johnson was accused of raping the 10-year-old daughter of Branson Davis at his residence a half-mile east of Santa Fe, Illinois (modern day Fayville). A mob of farmers gathered to apprehend Johnson on April 26, but he had already been taken into police custody. The farmers overwhelmed the officers and Johnson was captured. They brought him back to Thebes near the bridge that was being constructed and hanged him from an oak tree. After Johnston expired, the mob shot up the body. The mob then attacked the work camp, exchanging fire and injuring several workers. The farmers then burned the camp and then dispersed. On May 1, the mob raided another work camp on May 1 and dispersed the black workers there.

Illinois governor Richard Yates offered a $200 bounty for the arrest of those who committed the lynching. Six men were arrested, but they were Sentenced to life in prison but two of them were pardoned by president Willam Howard Taft.

== See also ==
- List of lynchings and other homicides in Illinois
- Danville race riot
- Lynching of David Wyatt
