= Chester Weger =

American convicted murderer (1939–2025)

Chester Otto Weger
- Born: March 3, 1939
- Died: June 22, 2025 (aged 86)
- Occupation: Dishwasher
- Status: Paroled
- Motive: Sexual assault and robbery
- Conviction: Murder
- Penalty: Life imprisonment

Details
- Victims: Frances Murphy (47), Mildred Lindquist (50) and Lillian Oetting (50)
- Date: March 14, 1960
- Country: United States
- Location: Starved Rock State Park in LaSalle County, Illinois
- Weapon: Tree limb
- Imprisoned at: Illinois State Penitentiary and Pinckneyville Correctional Center

Chester Otto Weger (March 3, 1939 – June 22, 2025) was an American man who was convicted in 1961 of the murder of one of three women found slain at Starved Rock State Park the previous year. He was held at Pinckneyville Correctional Center and at one time was the longest serving inmate incarcerated by the state of Illinois as well as the third longest in state history before his release on February 21, 2020. On November 21, 2019, the Illinois Prisoner Review Board granted parole to Weger by a vote of 9–4. He was released on parole on February 21, 2020.

== Murders ==
On Monday, March 14, 1960, Frances Murphy (47), Mildred Lindquist (50) and Lillian Oetting (50), wives of prominent Chicago businessmen, took a four-day trip to Starved Rock State Park in LaSalle County, Illinois, along the banks of the Illinois River. They arrived from the Chicago suburb of Riverside, about 90 miles northeast of the park. After registering at the Starved Rock Lodge, the women embarked on an afternoon hike to St. Louis Canyon but never returned. Their disappearances went unnoticed by lodge employees, despite repeated attempts to reach them by family members.

On March 16, Robert Murphy, the husband of Frances Murphy, phoned the lodge to inquire about his wife. A check of the rooms revealed the women's suitcases were still packed and the beds undisturbed. Police organized a search of the park that led to the discovery of the women's bodies, bound with twine and partially disrobed, inside a cave in the canyon. All three had suffered severe head trauma and a blood-stained tree limb found nearby was determined to have been used to bludgeon them to death.

Weger, a dishwasher at the Starved Rock Lodge, was among those interviewed by Illinois State Police in the aftermath of the discovery. Several employees of the lodge later testified in court that Weger arrived to work on the day after the women's disappearances with scratches on his face. He was questioned extensively in the ensuing weeks and was administered six polygraph tests, which he passed, but investigators continued to pursue Weger, who had been suspected of a crime during the previous year. Weger had fit the description of an assailant who bound a teenage boy and girl with twine and then raped the girl at nearby Matthiessen State Park in September 1959 and was later identified by the girl in a photo lineup. The twine used to bind the murder victims was presented as the same found in the kitchen at the lodge, and Weger failed a polygraph test in September, causing investigators to place him under nonstop surveillance.

On November 16, the LaSalle County state's attorney conducted a 24-hour interrogation of Weger, who eventually confessed to the murders and led police in a reenactment at the crime scene. However, just days later after he was appointed a public defender, Weger recanted his confession, claiming that it given under duress after being threatened by the interrogators. A grand jury returned indictments against Weger for all three murders as well as the rape and robbery at Matthiessen State Park. However, the state elected to only try him for the murder of Lillian Oetting.

After calling over 350 veniremen, a jury was selected, and Weger's trial began on February 13, 1961. His defense relied on the claim that investigators were relentless in extracting a confession from him, threatening the electric chair and exerting physical abuse, accusations the investigators and other witnesses denied. Weger claimed that he had been having a haircut during the time of the murders and that the scratches on his face in the days after the murders were caused by shaving. Tests on blood stains found on Weger's leather jacket analyzed by the FBI were inconclusive as to a human or animal source.

On March 3, 1961, the jury returned a verdict of guilty and fixed a sentence of life imprisonment, rejecting the state's request to sentence Weger to death. He was formally sentenced on April 3 and began serving his sentence at Illinois State Penitentiary in Joliet. His attorney John A. McNamara filed an appeal that reached the Illinois Supreme Court, but the verdict was affirmed in September 1962.

== Parole ==
In prison, Weger repeatedly professed his innocence over the decades but was consistently denied parole. On November 29, 2018, he fell one vote short of parole in a 7–7 split of the Illinois Prisoner Review Board. On November 21, 2019, the same board voted 9–4 to grant Weger's release after nearly 59 years in prison. He was released to a Chicago mission that aids parolees with rehabilitation. After a 90-day delay as the Illinois attorney general sought an evaluation of Weger under the state’s Sexually Violent Persons Commitment Act, he was released on February 21, 2020.

In 2022, a hair found on a glove worn by victim Frances Murphy was tested. The hair was determined to be that of a man, and DNA was successfully retrieved from it. The hair was excluded as that of Weger. In March 2024, Weger's attorney Andy Hale revealed that genealogical testing had identified the source of the DNA as one of three brothers of the Bray family, although each of the men was over the age of 60 at the time of the murders.

Weger died on June 22, 2025 at the age of 86.

== In the media ==
On December 14, 2021, HBO Max released a three-part docuseries titled The Murders of Starved Rock. The series focuses on the investigation into the murders, Weger's incarceration and the question of his culpability. The series, produced by Mark Wahlberg and directed by Jody McVeigh-Schultz, focuses on David Raccuglia, son of Anthony Raccuglia, a prosecuting attorney from Weger's murder trial.

== See also ==
- List of homicides in Illinois
- List of longest prison sentences served
- William Heirens – served 65 years in Illinois detention
- Richard Honeck – served 64 years in Illinois detention
