= Duck walk =

Duck walk may refer to:

- Duckwalk, an eccentric form of walking while squatting low
- Strongman event

== See also ==
- Duck Walk Killer, a spree killer in Chicago, Illinois, United States
- Duckboard, a type of boardwalk
