= List of killings by law enforcement officers in the United States, November 2018 =

This is a list of people reported killed by non-military law enforcement officers in the United States in November 2018, whether in the line of duty or not, and regardless of reason or method. The listing documents the occurrence of a death, making no implications regarding wrongdoing or justification on the part of the person killed or officer involved. Killings are arranged by date of the incident that caused death. Different death dates, if known, are noted in the description. The table below lists 89 people.

== November 2018 ==
Date	Name (and age) of deceased	Race	State (city)	Description
2018-11-30	Richard Galvan (37)	Hispanic	Ogden, UT	
2018-11-30	Matthew John Lorenzen (19)	White	New Underwood, SD	
2018-11-29	Name Withheld	Hispanic	Boulevard, CA	
2018-11-29	Name Withheld	Hispanic	Boulevard, CA	
2018-11-29	Name Withheld	Hispanic	Boulevard, CA	
2018-11-29	Adrian Bunker (37)	White	Old Town, ME	
2018-11-29	Miguel Angel Duran Delgado (46)	Hispanic	Arizona (Phoenix)	
2018-11-28	David Villagran (33)	Hispanic	Vancouver, WA	
2018-11-28	Bobby Lee Calhoun (30)	Black	Texas (Houston)	
2018-11-28	Jay Nesbit (78)	Unknown race	Parker, AZ	
2018-11-28	Benjamin "B.J." Kennedy (35)	White	Louisville, KY	
2018-11-28	Joe Richard Shorty (39)	Native American	Lakewood, CO	
2018-11-28	Vernon May (32)	Native American	Bemidji, MN	
2018-11-27	J. Scot Alan Widmark (41)	White	Virginia, MN	
2018-11-27	Nicholas Charles Ryan (19)	White	Centennial, CO	
2018-11-27	Bert E. Mercado (42)	Native Hawaiian	Pahoa, HI	
2018-11-27	Jarmane Dywane Logan (35)	Black	Topeka, KS	
2018-11-26	Sierra Sierra McCauley (23)	White	Tennessee (Knoxville)	Sierra McCauley, 23 years old, was naked on a public sidewalk when Officer James Gadd arrived on scene. He gave 10 verbal commands in 22 seconds before shooting the naked woman. McCauley died of her injuries. The shooting was ruled justified.
2018-11-26	Nathan Shane May (43)	White	New Albany, MS	
2018-11-25	Allen Scott Culpepper (64)	White	Clinton, UT	
2018-11-24	Felix Anthony Calata (32)	Hispanic	Salt Lake City, UT	
2018-11-23	Christopher L. Anderson (46)	White	Central City, KY	
2018-11-23	Pilar del Lirio Guerra (39)	Hispanic	Cidra, Puerto Rico	A Puerto Rico police officer shot and killed his wife.
2018-11-23	Martez Webb (23)	Black	Michigan (Detroit)	
2018-11-22	Sarge Junior (16)	Black	Illinois (Chicago)	
2018-11-22	Patrick Michael Langhoff (59)	White	Crested Butte, CO	
2018-11-22	Cameron McCarthy (20)	White	Palmer, AK	
2018-11-22	Emantic Fitzgerald Bradford Jr. (21)	Black	Alabama (Hoover)	See Shooting of Emantic Fitzgerald Bradford Jr.
2018-11-21	Brianna Nicole Post (24)	White	Talladega, AL	
2018-11-21	Robert William Reid (42)	White	Harrison, MI	
2018-11-21	Billy G. Heeter (52)	White	Columbus, OH	
2018-11-21	Nathan Schenk	White	Pasadena, TX	
2018-11-21	Martin Lopez (24)	Hispanic	Bell Gardens, CA	
2018-11-21	Keaton James Larson (22)	White	Stillwater, MN	
2018-11-21	Eugene Benjamin Weathers (48)	Black	Talladega, AL	
2018-11-20	Craig Allen (71)	Unknown race	Arizona (Phoenix)	
2018-11-20	Roderick McDaniel (33)	Black	Magnolia, AR	
2018-11-19	Juan Lopez (32)	Hispanic	Illinois (Chicago)	See Mercy Hospital shooting
2018-11-19	Daniel Cedars (65)	White	Indiana (Indianapolis)	
2018-11-19	Christopher Eugene Williams (41)	White	Meridian, ID	
2018-11-18	Jenessa M. Cooper (49)	White	Missoula, MT	
2018-11-17	Rio Antwuan Thomas (27)	Black	Fort Pierce, FL	
2018-11-16	Anthony Rodriguez	Hispanic	Texas (Houston)	
2018-11-15	G.D. Hendrix (48)	White	Oroville, CA	
2018-11-15	Allen Fanning (18)	Black	Greenwood Village, CO	
2018-11-15	Agustin "Augie" Andres Gonsalez (29)	Hispanic	Hayward, CA	
2018-11-15	Jack Darrel Fields Jr. (25)	Black	Augusta, GA	
2018-11-15	Steven Smith Jr. (60)	White	Demopolis, AL	
2018-11-14	Jose S. Banda	Hispanic	Texas (Houston)	
2018-11-14	John David Manning (29)	White	Spartanburg, SC	
2018-11-14	George Crenshaw (55)	Unknown race	Haynesville, AL	
2018-11-14	Olajuwon Raekwon Murphy (22)	Black	Fort Chiswell, VA	
2018-11-14	Joseph Loughery (59)	White	Auburn, MA	
2018-11-13	Timothy Odell Leon (24)	Black	Arizona (Glendale)	
2018-11-13	Rene Prieto (38)	Hispanic	Pratt, KS	
2018-11-12	Daniel Ayala (30)	Hispanic	Alpine, CA	
2018-11-12	Edward M. Walsh (39)	White	Mantoloking, NJ	
2018-11-12	Cesar Alejandro Ramos-Hernandez (25)	Hispanic	Chattanooga, TN	
2018-11-12	Marty West (63)	White	Fresno, CA	
2018-11-12	Tony Lamont Mathis (47)	Black	Oklahoma (Oklahoma City)	
2018-11-12	Andrew Richard Kana (36)	Asian	Oklahoma (Ponca City)	Three officers approached Kana at the I Don't Care Bar and Grill, for whom they had a warrant for his arrest for domestic violence. One of the officers handcuffed one of Kana's hands, but Kana refused to have his other hand handcuffed. Kana then pulled out a handgun with his free hand, at which the officer immediately shot him in the chest, killing him.
2018-11-11	Jemel Roberson (26)	Black	Illinois (Robbins)	Robertson, an African-American man and security guard at a bar near Chicago was responding to a shooting incident at the bar. Robertson was carrying a firearm which he was licensed to as part of his job. As officers approached the scene, one of them misidentified Roberton as the shooter and shot and killed him. 5 additional people sustained gunshot injuries during the incident, although none were believed to be life threatening.
2018-11-11	Elisha Edward Kelley (52)	White	Wagoner, OK	
2018-11-11	Flores, Clemente (22)	Hispanic	Georgia (South Fulton)	An officer pursuing a stolen car collided with a work van while making a left turn, killing three men and wounding three others. The driver of the van, who survived, said the officer didn't use his lights or siren. The officer was indicted on three counts each of first-degree vehicular homicide and involuntary manslaughter in 2022.
2018-11-11	Martin, Marcus (22)	Unknown	Georgia (South Fulton)	An officer pursuing a stolen car collided with a work van while making a left turn, killing three men and wounding three others. The driver of the van, who survived, said the officer didn't use his lights or siren. The officer was indicted on three counts each of first-degree vehicular homicide and involuntary manslaughter in 2022.
2018-11-11	Sanchez-Hernandez, Camerino (20)	Hispanic	Georgia (South Fulton)	An officer pursuing a stolen car collided with a work van while making a left turn, killing three men and wounding three others. The driver of the van, who survived, said the officer didn't use his lights or siren. The officer was indicted on three counts each of first-degree vehicular homicide and involuntary manslaughter in 2022.
2018-11-09	Cody Paris "See Smoke" Belgard (30)	White	Salt Lake City, UT	
2018-11-09	Christopher William Parrish (33)	White	Ogden, UT	
2018-11-09	James P. Hanchett (61)	White	Shakopee, MN	
2018-11-09	Travis Jordan (36)	Black	Minnesota (Minneapolis)	Two officers approached Travis Jordan's house for a wellness check, as Jordan had mental health problems. Jordan did not answer the door but could be heard talking on the phone saying he "was ready to go down." Shortly after Jordan emerged from the house holding a large kitchen knife, cursing and repeatedly shouting "let's do this" to the officers. After charging at one of the officers both opened fire. Jordan died shortly after, it is suspected he committed intentional suicide by cop.
2018-11-07	Ron Helus	Unknown	California (Thousand Oaks)	Helus was responding to a mass shooting at a bar when he was shot four times by the shooter. He was then accidentally shot and killed by another officer responding to the scene.
2018-11-08	Jesus "Chuy" Guzman (34)	Hispanic	Charleston View, CA	
2018-11-07	Mark Anthony Sanchez	Hispanic	San Antonio, TX	
2018-11-06	Unnamed man	Unknown race	Kissimmee, FL	
2018-11-06	Delson Silva	Hispanic	Corona, CA	
2018-11-05	George Lyman Smith (72)	White	Port Charlotte, FL	
2018-11-05	Anovath Troy Kongvongxay (48)	Asian	Spartanburg, SC	
2018-11-05	Gary Jay Willis (61)	White	Glen Burnie, MD	
2018-11-05	Henry Gregory Stroud (37)	White	Newport, TN	
2018-11-04	Ryan Michael Millsap (19)	White	Golden, CO	
2018-11-04	Robert Michael "Robbie" Ramirez (39)	Hispanic	Laramie, WY	
2018-11-04	Anthony David Chavez (18)	Hispanic	New Mexico (Albuquerque)	
2018-11-04	Theoddeus Gray (29)	Black	St. Clair Shores, MI	
2018-11-03	Laudemer Arboleda (33)	Native Hawaiian or Pacific Islander	California (Danville)	Arboleda, a mentally ill man, was shot by officer Andrew Hall during a slow-speed chase. Hall claims that Arboleda attempted to run him over, and he fired nine times. In April 2021, Hall was charged with voluntary manslaughter and assault for the shooting. The same officer shot and killed a man in March 2021.
2018-11-03	Robert Charles Foster (65)	White	Bandon, OR	
2018-11-03	Kanwarbir Mahli (25)	Asian	Shelby Charter Township, MI	
2018-11-02	Andrew James Moore (25)	White	Charleston, WV	
2018-11-02	Jesse Jesus Quinton (35)	Black	Idaho Falls, ID	
2018-11-01	Tony Bernard Smith Jr. (24)	Black	Florida (Jacksonville)	

== See also ==
- Death in custody § United States
- Henry A. Wallace Police Crime Public Database
- List of cases of police brutality
- List of countries with annual rates and counts for killings by law enforcement officers
- List of law enforcement officers killed in the line of duty in the United States
- List of law enforcement officers convicted for an on-duty killing in the United States
- List of shootings by US immigration agents
- List of police reforms related to the George Floyd protests
- List of unarmed African Americans killed by law enforcement officers in the United States
- Lists of killings by law enforcement officers
- Police brutality in the United States
- Police misconduct § United States
- Police riot § United States
- Police use of deadly force in the United States
