= Stockton serial shootings =

Series of shootings in California

- Date: April 10, 2021 – September 27, 2022
- Location: Stockton and Oakland, California, U.S.
- Type: Shooting
- Deaths: 7
- Injuries: 1
- Suspects: Wesley Brownlee
- Weapon: 9mm Glock 19-style handgun

The Stockton serial shootings were a series of fatal shootings that occurred in Stockton and Oakland, California, between April 2021 and September 2022. The shootings have been linked by ballistic tests, but police have not revealed if the same gun was used in every shooting. On October 15, 2022, a Stockton man, Wesley Brownlee, was arrested in connection to the shootings. On December 27, Brownlee was charged with an additional five charges. As of 2026, Brownlee is still being examined for competency for trial.

== Shootings ==
Person of interest in the Stockton serial shootings. It is unknown whether they are a suspect, a witness, or unrelated entirely.

=== 2021 shootings ===
Miguel Vasquez, a 39-year-old Hispanic man, was shot to death in East Oakland on April 10, 2021.

Mervin Harmon, a 39-year-old Black man, was shot to death in Oakland on April 16, 2021.

At 3:20 a.m. on April 16, 2021, Natasha LaTour, a 46-year-old Black woman, was approached by the gunman at an encampment in Park and Union streets in Stockton. LaTour described the perpetrator as a man who wore dark clothing and a face mask. After seeing him point a gun at her from near her tent, she charged towards him in an attempt to defend herself, but was shot multiple times. However, she survived her injuries.

=== 2022 shootings ===
On July 8, 2022, Paul Yaw, a 35-year-old Caucasian man, was shot to death at about 12:31 a.m. on the 5600 block of Kermit Lane.

Salvador Debudey Jr., a 43-year-old Hispanic man, was fatally shot on the 4900 block of West Lane. The shooting happened at about 9:50 a.m. on August 11, 2022.

On August 30, 2022, 21-year-old Jonathan Hernandez Rodriguez, a Hispanic man, was fatally shot along the 800 block of E. Hammer Lane at about 6:41 a.m.

52-year-old Juan Cruz, a Hispanic man, was shot to death at about 4:27 a.m. on September 21, 2022. The murder happened on the 4400 block of Manchester Avenue.

On September 27, 2022, Lawrence Lopez Sr., a 54-year-old Hispanic man, was fatally shot on the 900 block of Porter Avenue at about 1:53 a.m. He would be the killer's final victim.

== Investigation ==
In every case, the victim was out alone, during the night or in the early morning, in a dimly-lit area. None of the victims were robbed, and the shootings are not believed to be gang-related. The suspect is described as a slim male, 5'10 to 6 feet tall, and of an unknown race. He was seen wearing a dark-colored jacket with the hood pulled over his head, dark-colored pants, and a black face mask. The Stockton Police Department has released a video of a person of interest in the case. There is no evidence connecting the person of interest to the shootings, but investigators wish to speak with him.

Stockton and Oakland police are working alongside several other law enforcement agencies, such as the Federal Bureau of Investigation, California Highway Patrol, local sheriff's departments, and the Bureau of Alcohol, Tobacco, Firearms and Explosives. A reward of $125,000 was announced for information leading to an arrest. A tip line was also set up.

After speculation by CBS News, the Chicago Police Department stated investigators did not believe the Stockton shootings were related to the Duck Walk Killer, who similarly shot two men in Chicago in 2018.

=== Suspect ===
Early on the morning of October 15, 2022, police arrested a Stockton man, Wesley Brownlee, in connection to the shootings. According to police, the man was arrested at Winslow Way and Village Green Drive while armed with a firearm and wearing dark-colored clothing and a mask around his neck.

==== Early life ====
Wesley Brownlee was born in San Francisco in 1979, but he grew up in Oakland.

In May 1994, Brownlee was arrested along with two other boys on suspicion of sexually assaulting a 14-year-old girl, according to court records. In interviews with a juvenile probation officer, Brownlee blamed the sexual assault on his two friends and claimed innocence.

In October 1995, when Brownlee was 16, his brother Dale Brownlee, who was 17 years old, was shot and killed as a result of a "drug-related shooting." Six months earlier, Wesley's close friend Kogo Upshaw, 18 years old, was stabbed to death. According to court records, Brownlee became "very distressed" over his brother's death.

In 1997, at age 18, Brownlee was arrested for possessing 67 bindles of crack cocaine. He was sentenced to three years of probation, but in 1998 his probation was revoked after he was arrested for selling cocaine to an undercover cop, and he was sentenced to two years in state prison. Court records say he served it in San Quentin State Prison. In 2014, he was convicted of selling narcotics. He received a prison sentence and probation.

Brownlee was employed as a truck driver at the time of the murders.
