= Independence Day shooting =

Independence Day shooting may refer to:

- 1999 Independence Day weekend shootings, a three-day shooting spree in Illinois and Indiana
- Highland Park parade shooting, which occurred at an Independence Day parade in 2022
