= List of homicides in Illinois =

This is a list of homicides in Illinois. This list includes notable homicides committed in the U.S. state of Illinois that have a Wikipedia article on the killing, the killer, or the victim. It is divided into five subject areas as follows:

1. Multiple homicides – homicides having multiple victims. It includes incidents such as the 1886 Haymarket affair, the 1966 murder of six student nurses by Richard Speck, and the 1982 Chicago Tylenol murders
2. Serial killers – persons who murder three or more persons, with the incidents taking place over more than a month and including a significant period of time between them. This includes John Wayne Gacy, the most prolific serial killer in Illinois history.
3. Organized crime – notable homicides involving the Italian-American organized crime syndicate or crime family based in Chicago. These include the 1929 Saint Valentine's Day Massacre and the 1975 murder of Sam Giancana.
4. Lynchings and race riots – homicides associated with lynching and race riots. These include the 1844 Killing of Joseph Smith and the Chicago race riot of 1919.
5. Single homicides – notable homicides involving a single fatality which do not fall within the scope of one of the above categories. These incidents include the 1924 murder of Bobby Franks by Leopold and Loeb.

This article does not include military battles fought in Illinois. Such battles, including battles fought during the Black Hawk War, may be found at List of battles fought in Illinois.

This article also does not include people who have been executed in Illinois. Such persons are listed separately at List of people executed in Illinois.

== Multiple homicides ==
Listed in chronological order

Incident	Location	Date	Deaths	Description	Sources
Lively massacre	Washington County	1813	3	Native Americans killed John Lively, his wife and their children	
Indian Creek massacre	LaSalle County	1832-05-21	15	Attack by Native Americans on white settlers after settlers built a dam that prevented fish from reaching Potawatomi village	
St. Vrain massacre	Pearl City	1832-05-24	4	White Indian agent and three companions killed in an attack by Native Americans	
Charleston riot	Charleston	1864-03-28	9	Clash between Union soldiers and Republicans, on one side, and Democrats known as Copperheads, on other side	
Haymarket affair	Chicago	1886-05-04	11	Rally in support of eight-hour work day, including protester throwing dynamite bomb at police and police opening fire on protesters	
Battle of Virden	Virden	1898-10-12	13	Labor union and racial conflict during a strike by the United Mine Workers	
Pana riot	Pana	1899-04-10	7	Coal mining labor dispute and racial conflict, part of the Illinois coal wars	
Marrazzo massacre	Chicago	1918-10-21	5	Peter Marrazzo killed his wife and 4 children during the height of the Spanish flu pandemic. He was committed to a mental hospital but released after only 2 years.	
Herrin massacre	Herrin	1922-06-21/22	23	Labor violence during coal strike	
1937 Memorial Day massacre	Chicago	1937-05-30	10	Chicago police shot and killed 10 unarmed demonstrators during Little Steel strike	
James Morelli	Chicago	1947-12-12	3	Mad Dog killings	
Murder of the Grimes sisters	Chicago	1956-12-28	2	Sisters ages 12 and 15 disappeared returning home from movie theater, bodies discovered three weeks later	
Chester Weger	Starved Rock State Park	1960-03	3	Murdered three middle-aged women, wives of prominent Chicago businessmen	
Richard Speck	Chicago	1966-07-13	8	Murdered eight student nurses in their Chicago residence	
Simon Nelson	Rockford	1978-01-07	6	Rockford man killed his six children (ages 3 to 12) and the family dog	
Latin Kings murders	Chicago	1979-02-25	3	Three teenagers were found with their throats slashed in a car in Chicago. They were murdered after asking Latin Kings members where they could buy marijuana.	
Kenneth Allen	Chicago	1979-03-03	2	Convicted of killing two Chicago police officers	
Chicago Tylenol murders	Chicago	1982	7	Poisoning deaths resulting from placing potassium cyanide in Tylenol capsules in Chicago metropolitan area	
Charles Walker	St. Clair County	1983-06-18	2	Murdered a young couple after robbing them, later executed	
Dardeen family homicides	Ina	1987-11-17	4	Family murdered in mobile home	
Murder of Nick Corwin	Winnetka	1988-05-20	2	Mentally ill woman shot eight-year-old boy at elementary school and then committed suicide	
1988 Chicago shootings	Chicago	1988-09-22	5	Spree shooting at an auto parts store and Moses Montefiore Academy	
Jeffrey and Jill Erickson	Chicago		4	Bank robber killed a marshall and a police detective, then committed suicide	
Michael Alfonso		1992, 2001	2	Committed two murders, listed on FBI's Ten Most Wanted list	
Brown's Chicken massacre	Palatine	1993-01-08	7	Two robbers killed seven employees at a fast-food restaurant	
Mark Winger	Springfield	1995-08-29	2	Former nuclear power plant technician murdered his wife and a van driver	
1999 Independence Day weekend shootings	Illinois, Indiana	1999-07-04	3	White supremacist wounded nine Orthodox Jews	
2003 Chicago warehouse shooting	Chicago	2003-08-27	7	Salvador Tapia attacks his former workplace with a pistol before getting slain by police	
Jorge Avila-Torrez	Zion	2005-05	3	Killed two girls, ages 8 and 9, on Mother's Day	
Lane Bryant shooting	Tinley Park	2008-02-02	5	Mass murder and armed robbery at clothing outlet	
Northern Illinois University shooting	DeKalb	2008-02-14	6	Mass shooting on a crowd of students	
Murder of Jason Hudson	Chicago	2008-10-24	2	Brother and mother of singer Jennifer Hudson shot at their home	
Gage Park murders	Chicago	2016-02-02	6	Six members of Martinez family murdered in house in Gage Park, Chicago	
Duck Walk Killer	Chicago	2018	2	Unsolved spree killing in Rogers Park neighborhood	
Mercy Hospital shooting	Chicago	2018-11-19	4	Mass shooting at hospital	
Aurora, Illinois shooting	Aurora	2019-02-15	6	Mass shooting at Henry Pratt Company	
2019 Goodfield arson	Goodfield	2019-04-06	5	Arson fire in mobile home started by nine-year-old boy	
Don Carter Bowling Alley Shooting	Rockford	2020-26-12	3	An active duty soldier shot-up a bowling alley	
2021 Chicago - Evanston shootings	Chicago and Evanston	2021-01-09	6	Random shooting spree	
Magnificent Mile shooting	Chicago	2022-05-19	2	Mass shooting in shopping district	
Highland Park parade shooting	Highland Park	2022-07-04	7	Mass shooting at Independence Day parade, also 48 wounded	
Death of Sania Khan	Chicago	2022-07-18	2	Man shot estranged wife after she posted about divorce experience on TikTok, then committed suicide	
2024 Joliet shootings	Preston Heights & Joliet	2024-01-21	8	Man opened fire at multiple locations, killing seven family members and an unrelated victim	
2025 Chicago shooting	Chicago	2025-07-02	4	Mass drive by shooting outside of a nightclub in River North, 4 killed, 14 injured, perpetrator still at large	

== Serial killers ==
Listed in chronological order by date of earliest homicide

Incident	Location	Date	Deaths	Description	Sources
Johann Otto Hoch	Chicago	1890–1905	1–50+	Also known as "The Bluebeard Murderer"	
H. H. Holmes	Multiple	1891–1894		Con artist and serial killer executed in 1896	
Robert Nixon	California, Illinois	1937–1938	3–5	Serial killer, basis for Bigger Thomas in Native Son	
John Agrue	Illinois, Colorado	1966–1982	3+	Serial killer whose first murder in 1966 was of his sister-in-law in Joliet, Illinois	
John Wayne Gacy	Norwood Park	1972–1978	33–45	Serial killer and rapist, also known as the "Killer Clown", who killed at least 33 young men and boys	
Robert Ben Rhoades	Texas, Illinois	1975–1990	3–50+	Serial killer and rapist known as "The Truck Stop Killer"	
Charles Albanese	McHenry	1980–1981	3	Serial killer who poisoned three relatives with arsenic	
Ripper Crew	Illinois	1981–1982	18	Satanic cult and organized crime group composed of serial killers, cannibals, rapists, and necrophiles Robin Gecht[1] and three associates	
Larry Eyler	Multiple	1982–1984	21–24	Known as the "Interstate Killer", he murdered at least 21 teenage boys and young men throughout the Midwest	
Andrew Urdiales	Illinois, Indiana, California	1986–1996	8	Murdered three of his victims in Illinois	
Dorothy Williams	Illinois	1987–1989	3	Killed three elderly people during robberies	
Jeffrey Dahmer	Chicago, Milwaukee	1991	17	Dahmer met two of his victims (Matt Turner and Jeremiah Weinberger) in Chicago and paid them to go with him to Milwaukee where he murdered them	
Southside Strangler	Chicago	1990s–2000s	?	Suspected serial killer; responsibility later established to different offenders	
Andre Crawford	Chicago	1993–1999	11	Murdered 11 women, many of them drug addicts and sex workers, in Chicago	
Ronald Hinton	Chicago	1996–1999	3	Raped and strangled three women in Rogers Park neighborhood	
Kevin Taylor	Chicago	2001	4	Strangled four prostitutes	
Chicago Strangler	Chicago	2001–2018	?	Unconfirmed serial killer, or serial killers, believed to be responsible for the deaths of a number of women in Chicago	

== Organized crime ==
Incident	Location	Date	Deaths	Description	Sources
Shotgun Man	Chicago	1910–1911	15	Assassin and spree killer to whom murders of Italian immigrants were attributed	
Maurice Enright	Chicago	1920-02-02	1	Irish-American gangster gunned down near his South Side home	
Big Jim Colosimo	Chicago	1920-05-11	1	Mafia crime boss killed, allegedly by Al Capone	
Anthony D'Andrea	Chicago	1921-06-07	1	Mafia boss shot by an assassin while entering his apartment	
Charles Reiser	Chicago	1921-10-10	1	Safecracker shot 10 times in hospital bed, corrupt coroner's jury ruled it a suicide	
Vito Di Giorgio	Chicago	1922-05-13	1	Italian-born crime boss based in Los Angeles, shot by gunmen while visiting Chicago	
Dean O'Banion	Chicago	1924-11-10	1	Bootlegger with North Side Gang shot	
Tony Genna	Chicago	1925-07-08	1	Head of Genna crime family, shot during gang war	
Samuzzo Amatuna	Chicago	1925-11-13	1	President of Unione Siciliane shot in barber's chair before attending opera	
Hymie Weiss	Chicago	1926-10-11	2	Polish-American mob boss and a second man killed in submachine gun and shotgun attack	
Joe Esposito	Chicago	1928-03-21	1	Politician involved with bootlegging and rival of Al Capone, killed in drive-by shooting on steps of his house	
Timothy D. Murphy	Chicago	1928-06-26	1	Mobster and labor racketeer shot at his front door	
Antonio Lombardo	Chicago	1928-09-07	2	Capone's consigliere and bodyguard gunned down; Saint Valentine's Day Massacre was revenge for his death	
Pasqualino Lolordo	Chicago	1929-01-08	1	Head of Chicago chapter of Unione Siciliana, shot by gunmen at his house under order from Bugs Moran	
Saint Valentine's Day Massacre	Chicago	1929-02-14	7	Murder of seven Irish members and associates of Chicago's North Side Gang that occurred on Saint Valentine's Day	
Jake Lingle	Chicago	1930-06-09	1	Reporter for Chicago Tribune shot in railroad underpass	
Joe Aiello	Chicago	1930-10-23	1	Sicilian bootlegger killed in bloody feud with Al Capone	
Gus Winkler	Chicago	1933-10-09	1	Gangster assassinated by shotgun fire after meeting with FBI	
William White	Oak Park	1934-01-23	1	Prohibition gangster killed in shootout with two unidentified men	
Fred Goetz	Cicero	1934-03-21		Suspected participant in Saint Valentine's Day Massacre shot outside a cafe	
Louis Alterie	Chicago	1935-07-18	1	Hitman for North Side Gang shot by sniper outside his home	
Jack McGurn	Chicago	1936-02-15	1	Sicilian-American boxer and mobster shot by three men at bowling alley	
Edward J. O'Hare	Cicero	1939-11-08	1	Lawyer who turned on Capone, shot while driving, son is namesake of O'Hare Airport	
Danny Stanton		1943-05-05	1	Chicago mobster and union racketeer, killed in dispute over gambling operations	
Lawrence Mangano	Cicero	1944-08-03	1	Member of Chicago Outfit shot by several gunmen while pulled over in car	
James Ragen		1946-08-15	1	Irish businessman and gangster shot while driving	
Theodore Roe	Chicago	1952-08-04	1	African-American organized crime figure known as "Robin Hood" shot after refusing to pay "street tax" to Chicago Outfit	
Charles Gioe	Chicago	1954-08-18	1	Lieutenant in Chicago Outfit, shot by soldiers from a competing group	
William Morris Bioff		1955-11-04	1	Chicago pimp killed in bombing	
Roger Touhy	Chicago	1959-12-16	1	Bootlegger murdered one month after being released from 29 years in prison	
William Jackson	Streeterville, Chicago	1961-08-11	1	Gangster tortured to death by fellow gangsters on suspicion he was an FBI informant	
Harry Aleman	Chicago	1972-09-27		Mobster initially acquitted and, after first trial was ruled corrupt, convicted at second trial of murdering a Teamsters official	
Sam DeStefano	Chicago	1973-04-14	1	Loan shark and torture-murderer associated with Chicago Outfit, shot by Tony Spilotro	
Richard Cain	Chicago	1973-12-20		Chicago police officer and Sam Giancana associate shot by masked gunman	
Sam Giancana	Oak Park	1975-06-19	1	Former boss of the Chicago Outfit murdered before his testimony to the Church Committee	
Charles Nicoletti	Northlake	1977-03-29	1	Mobster/hitman shot in back of head at restaurant parking lot	
William Dauber	Will County	1980-07-02		Chicago hitman shot in his car returning from testifying in court	
Allen Dorfman	Lincolnwood	1983-01-20		Longtime associate of Jimmy Hoffa and Chicago Outfit shot in parking lot	
Anthony Spilotro/Michael Spilotro	Bensenville	1986-06-14	2	Brothers associated with Chicago Outfit murdered and dumped in a nature preserve; James Marcello convicted for the murders	

== Lynchings and race riots ==
Incident	Location	Date	Deaths	Description	Sources
Elijah Parish Lovejoy	Alton	1837-11-07	1	Minister, newspaper editor, and abolitionist killed by a pro-slavery mob, became a martyr to the abolitionist cause	
Killing of Joseph Smith	Carthage	1844-06-27	2	Founder of Latter Day Saint movement killed along with his brother by a mob	
Lynching of Samuel J. Bush	Decatur	1893-06-03	1	Black day-laborer accused of raping white woman	
Lynching of F. W. Stewart	Lacon	1898-11-07	1	Black man accused of assault of a miner's daughter	
Lynching of William Johnson	Thebes	1903-04-26	1	Black man accused of assaulting a 10-year-old girl	
Lynching of David Wyatt	Belleville	1903-06	2	Black teacher denied renewal of teaching certificate, shot district superintendent and was then lynched	
Danville race riot	Danville	1903-07-25	1 rioter	Mob sought to lynch black man	
William "Froggie" James	Cairo	1909-11-11	1	Black man charged with rape and murder of 23-year-old shop clerk	
East St. Louis massacre	East St. Louis	1917-05/07	48-150+	Labor and race-related attacks by whites who murdered between 39 and 150 black people, nine whites killed	
Robert Prager	Collinsville	1918-04-05	1	German immigrant lynched during WWI due to anti-German sentiment	
Chicago race riot of 1919	Chicago South Side	1919-7-27 – 1919-8-3	38	Violent racial conflict began on South Side	

== Single homicides ==
Incident	Location	Date	Description	Sources
Jean La Lime	Chicago	1812-06-17	Trader from Quebec, "first murder in Chicago"	
George Davenport	Rock Island	1845-07-04	Pioneer of Quad Cities, namesake of Davenport, Iowa, murdered by Banditti of the Prairie	
Edmund Durfee	Hancock County	1845-11-15	Early member of Latter Day Saint movement, shot by anti-Mormon mob; remembered as a martyr of LDS church	
Sharon Tyndale	Springfield	1871-04-29	Illinois Secretary of State, redesigned state seal, assassinated outside his home	
Jimmy Elliott	Chicago	1883-03-01	Former world heavyweight boxing champion, shot by a gambler in a saloon	
Patrick Henry Cronin	Chicago	1889-05-04	Irish republican doctor murdered by affiliates of Clan na Gael	
Carter Harrison Sr.	Chicago	1893-10-28	Mayor of Chicago and former US Congressman, murdered at his home by a disappointed office-seeker	
Adolph Luetgert	Chicago	1897-05-01	German-American businessman convicted of murdering his second wife and dissolving her body in a vat filled with lye at his sausage company	
Hampton W. Wall	Staunton	1898-04-15	Illinois legislator murdered by a tenant	
Hale Johnson	Bogota	1902-11-04	Prohibition Part presidential candidate; shot to death while trying to collect a debt	
Murder of Clarence Hiller	Chicago	1910-09-19	Railroad clerk murdered, first use of fingerprint evidence for conviction	
Elsie Paroubek	Chicago	1911-04-08	Four-year-old Czech-American girl kidnapped and murdered	
Bugs Raymond	Chicago	1912-02-24	MLB pitcher beaten in a fight, died of fractured skull at age 30	
Leopold and Loeb	Chicago	1924-05	Wealthy students at University of Chicago kidnapped and murdered 14-year-old Bobby Franks	
John M. Bolton	Chicago	1936-07-09	Businessman and Illinois legislator reportedly assassinated by organized crime due to his efforts to legalize some forms of betting	
Carl Choisser	Ozark	1939-09-25	Politician, lawyer, and newspaper editor shot after quarrel with murder defendant	
Frank Melrose	Chicago	1941-09-01	Jazz and blues pianist killed in fracas in club	
Gordon McNaughton	Chicago	1942-08-06	MLB pitcher shot in hotel lobby by ex-girlfriend	
Sonny Boy Williamson I	Chicago	1948-06-01	Blues musician killed in a robbery on Chicago's South Side	
Sol Butler	Chicago	1954-12-01	African-American NFL player and Olympic long jumper shot at a bar where he worked	
Malcolm Lee Beggs	Chicago	1956-12-10	Actor beaten to death with beer and whisky bottles in hotel room	
Murder of Maria Ridulph	Sycamore	1957-12-03	Seven-year-old girl disappeared and body found almost five months later	
Benjamin F. Lewis	Chicago	1963-02-28	Chicago alderman murdered in his ward office	
Murder of Michele LeAnn Morgan	Mascoutah	1961-08-11	Child abuse victim murdered by stepmother at age 4	
Fred Hampton	Chicago	1969-12-04	Deputy national chairman of Black Panther Party shot and killed in his bed in predawn raid	
Murder of Evelyn Okubo	Chicago	1970-07-18	Japanese-American teenager killed during Japanese-American convention at Palmer House	
Jeanine Nicarico murder case	Naperville	1972-07-07	Two Hispanic men wrongfully convicted of rape and murder	
Dragiša Kašiković	Chicago	1977-06-19	Bosnian Serb writer and his nine-year-old daughter murdered by Yugoslavian secret police	
Murder of Linda Goldstone	Chicago	1978-04-01	29-year-old childbirth instructor kidnapped, raped and murdered by Hernando Williams, who was executed for the murder in 1995	
Lee Jackson	Chicago	1979-07-01	Blues musician shot to death during a family argument	
Murder of Jaclyn Dowaliby	Chicago	1981-05-17	Seven-year-old girl disappeared from her bedroom, body discovered four days later	
Rudy Lozano	Chicago	1983-06-08	Labor activist organized "Black-Brown unity" in electing Harold Washington mayor, murdered shortly after Washington's election	
Ben Wilson	Chicago	1984-11-21	Top high school basketball player in USA shot to death	
Flukey Stokes	Chicago	1986-11-19	Drug kingpin murdered along with his chauffeur sitting in a Cadillac limousine	
Stephen B. Small	Kankakee	1987-09-02	Business kidnapped and held for ransom, died from asphyxiation due to conditions of confinement	
Ioan Petru Culianu	Chicago	1991-05-21	Romanian historian and writer, critical of the Romanian secret police, shot in a bathroom at the University of Chicago Divinity School	
Stuart Heaton case	Ramsey	1991-07-23	Stabbed a pregnant, 16-year-old girl 81 times with a pair of sewing scissors	
Dantrell Davis	Chicago	1992-10-13	Seven-year-old boy caught in crossfire as he walked to school with his mother at Cabrini-Green	
Joseph White	Chicago	1992-10-11	15-year-old male shot another student at Tilden High school over a game of dice	
Murder of Joseph Wallace	Chicago	1993-04-19	Three-year-old boy murdered by mentally-ill mother	
Robert Sandifer	Chicago	1994-09-01	11-year-old boy known as "Yummy" killed by fellow gang members out of fear he could become an informant	
Murder of Eric Morse	Chicago	1994-10-13	Five-year-old African-American boy dropped from a high-rise in the Ida B. Wells Homes by a 10- and 11-year-old boys	
Murder of Karyn Hearn Slover	Decatur	1996-09-27	23-year-old mother disappeared after leaving work and found two days later wrapped in plastic bags near a lake	
Lee Miglin	Chicago	1997-05-04	Real estate developer murdered in his home by spree killer Andrew Cunanan	
Murder of Peggy Johnson	McHenry	1999-07-20	Jane Doe body identified years later; nurse convicted in 2022 of her murder	
Ricky Byrdsong	Skokie	1999-07-03	First African-American head coach of Northwestern basketball team killed by a white supremacist in hate crime killing spree	
Regina and Margaret DeFrancisco		2000-06	Two teenage sisters murdered boyfriend of one, set body on fire, and gained national notoriety as fugitives	
Murder of Laree Slack		2001-11-11	12-year-old girl beaten to death by Jehovah's Witness father who claimed he was administering Biblical discipline	
Murder of Mary Stachowicz		2002-11-13	Polish-American woman murdered after questioning killer's sexuality, drew attention as alleged hate crime against Christian heterosexual	
Brice Hunter	Chicago	2004-04-19	Former NFL wide receiver shot outside his apartment	
Murder of Riley Fox	Wilmington	2004-06-06	Three-year old girl murder, father was accused but then cleared by DNA evidence	
Murder of Atcel Olmedo	Naperville	2005-09	Body of Mexican boy, age 2, discovered in Naperville	
Karen McCarron	Morton	2006-05-13	German-born pathologist suffocated her three-year-old autistic daughter	
Nicole Abusharif	Villa Park	2007-03-17	Murdered her domestic partner	
Murder of Derrion Albert	Chicago	2009-09-24	Murder at Christian Fenger Academy High School	
Murder of Hadiya Pendleton	Chicago	2013-01-29	15-year-old girl shot while standing with friends in a park; Barack Obama mentioned in State of Union	
Murder of Laquan McDonald	Chicago	2014-10-20	17-year-old African-American youth fatally shot by white police officer	
Murder of Yingying Zhang	Urbana	2017-06-09	Visiting Chinese scholar abducted, raped and murdered near University of Illinois	
Killing of Adam Toledo	Chicago	2021-03-29	13-year-old Latino boy shot by Chicago police officer	
Killing of Anthony Alvarez	Chicago	2021-03-31	Latino man shot by Chicago police, body camera footage showed he was shot in back while fleeing from police with a gun in his hand	
Killing of Zheng Shaoxiong	Chicago	2021-11-09	International student from China fatally shot near the University of Chicago	
Murder of Wadea al-Fayoume	Plainfield	2023-10-14	6-year old Palestinian-American boy murdered and his mother injured in a hate crime.	
Murder of Sonya Massey	Springfield	2024-07-06	36-year-old woman shot by a Sangamon County Sheriff's deputy in her home.	
