= One Chicago =

One Chicago or I Chicago or 1 Chicago, may refer to:

- OneChicago futures exchange, a securities exchange for futures derivatives based in Chicago, Illinois, USA
- Chicago (franchise), also called "One Chicago", a TV franchise from Dick Wolf Productions of interconnected TV shows set in Chicago, including Chicago Fire, Chicago PD, etc.
- One Chicago (building) (formerly One Chicago Square), River North, Chicago, Illinois, USA; a tall building

== See also ==
- Chicago I (also called "Chicago Transit Authority"), 1969 debut album of the band "Chicago" (then known as "Chicago Transit Authority")
- First Chicago Corporation
- Chicago (disambiguation)
