= Stephen B. Small =

American businessman kidnapped and murdered in 1987

Stephen Burrell Small (18 March 1947 – 2 September 1987) was a prominent American businessman in Kankakee, Illinois. In 1987, he was kidnapped and held for ransom by Danny Edwards and Nancy Rish. The conditions of his confinement caused him to die of asphyxiation. As a result, Edwards was given the death penalty (later commuted) and Rish was sentenced to life in prison without parole.

== Biography ==
Small was born in 1947 and raised in Kankakee, Illinois. His parents, Burrell and Reva Small, owned and operated a media conglomerate called Mid America Media; the Small family also owned the controlling interest in United Press International; and this is where Small himself worked. His great-grandfather was Illinois governor Len Small. Stephen Small had received his education at Lake Forest Academy, the University of Denver and Mark Hopkins College. In 1969, he married Nancy Pedersen, with whom he had three sons.

== Kidnapping ==
Around 12:30 a.m. on September 2, 1987, someone claiming to be a Kankakee police officer called the Small home and told Stephen Small that a burglary had occurred at the B. Harley Bradley House, a property that Small owned and was in the process of renovating. Small got dressed and left his home. Around 3:30 that morning someone called the Small residence and told Stephen's wife, Nancy, "We have your husband." Nancy then heard her husband say that he had been handcuffed inside a box underground. Small told his wife to obtain $1 million in cash. The caller directed Mrs. Small not to report the matter to the police. The matter was reported to the authorities, however, and devices were connected to the Smalls' telephone line to record incoming calls and to determine their origins. At 5:03 that afternoon, the same person called again, asking Mrs. Small how much money had been collected. This call was placed from a telephone located at a Phillips 66 gas station in Aroma Park. Edwards was seen there at that time, in the company of a blonde-haired woman. At 5:40 p.m., Jean Alice Small, Stephen Small's aunt, telephoned the Small residence to tell them of a call she had just received. Jean said that the caller had told her that he knew that Nancy Small's telephone was tapped. After telling Jean that the victim was buried, the caller threatened to kill Jean's husband. Nancy Small received another telephone call from the kidnapper at 11:28 that night. This call originated from a telephone at a Sunoco station in Aroma Park, where an FBI agent saw a white male at a telephone, and a blonde-haired woman in a car that was later identified as belonging to Nancy Rish, Edwards' girlfriend; Rish had blonde hair. The caller played a tape recording of Stephen Small's voice. On the tape, Stephen provided instructions for delivering the ransom. After audio enhancement, a voice in the background could be heard threatening Small.

== Tracking and arrest of Edwards and Rish ==
Nancy Small received one more telephone call from the kidnapper, at 11:46 that night. The call was placed from a Marathon service station in Kankakee. The caller accused Nancy of having notified the police and refused her offer of the ransom. Minutes later, at 11:50 p.m., an Illinois State Police officer saw Rish's car, with its trunk partly open, driving from Kankakee toward Aroma Park. Law enforcement officers then placed Edwards' home under surveillance. They saw a dark-colored Buick, with its trunk partly open, arrive at the house in Bourbonnais where Edwards and Rish lived. Edwards and a white woman with blonde hair left the car and went inside. Officers carried out a search of the residence later that morning, on September 3, Rish and Edwards were arrested at that time. Later that day, Edwards led law enforcement officers to the site where the victim was buried. There, officers dug up a wooden box and found the victim's body inside. The box measured about six feet long and three feet wide, and was constructed of plywood. It contained a light connected to an automotive battery, a one-gallon jug of water, candy bars, gum, and a flashlight. A medical examiner later determined that the victim died of asphyxiation caused by suffocation. The medical examiner believed that the victim would not have survived more than three or four hours inside the enclosed box. The medical examiner noted that the pipe extending from the box into the open air was too long for its diameter to serve as an adequate air-exchange system.

== Edwards trial ==
The State presented other evidence connecting Edwards to these offenses. On the night of the victim's disappearance, around midnight, a neighbor of Edwards heard Edwards say, "Let's go, let's hit it," get into his car, and drive off. Also, two neighbors of the Small family saw Edwards' van, or one similar to it, parked in their neighborhood after midnight on September 2. One neighbor also noticed a mid-sized car at that time, heard two car doors slam, and saw the car and Edwards' van drive away with their lights off. Several witnesses saw Edwards constructing a wooden box in his garage during summer 1987, preceding the offenses here. Edwards gave various explanations for what he was going to do, saying that it would be used for a lemonade stand, or by his brother for transporting things, or at his brother's pool in Florida. A neighbor of the Smalls had seen a white van similar to Edwards' van driving through an alley next to the Smalls' home about 10 times that summer. While Edwards and Rish were visiting a boat store that summer, Edwards saw Stephen Small leaving the store in a sports car; Edwards was heard to say, "Boy, it sure would be nice to afford stuff like that." The search of Edwards's residence at the time of his arrest turned up a Kankakee telephone book with the name "Small" circled. Edwards' boots were found behind a washer and dryer at the residence, and soil on the boots matched a sample from the location where the box was buried. Soil in Edwards' van also matched the sample. White caulking material on gloves found in Edwards' trash had the same chemical composition as the caulking material used to fill in the seams of the wooden box in which the victim had been buried. Edwards' fingerprints were found on PVC pipe and duct tape recovered from the box. A person who owed Edwards money had had a pair of handcuffs stolen from him, and the same pair was later discovered on the victim. Another person who owed Edwards money had had a gun stolen, and it was found by investigators in the countryside near Aroma Park. Edwards purchased a battery that was found in the wooden box. Bolt cutters belonging to a company owned by Edwards' brother were found at a point between where the box was uncovered and where the victim's car was found, and they could have been the implement used to cut the chain connecting the handcuffs on the victim's wrists.

== Edwards sentence ==
At the close of evidence, the jury found Edwards guilty of first degree murder and aggravated kidnapping. A capital sentencing hearing was then conducted. At the first stage of the hearing, the jury found Edwards eligible for the death penalty because of his commission of murder during the course of another felony, aggravated kidnapping.

== Nancy Rish ==
On September 2, 1987, during the kidnapping and murder of Kankakee business man Stephen B. Small, the investigation focused on Danny Edwards and Nancy Rish, who lived together in a townhouse in Bourbonnais. On September 4, a search warrant was executed for the townhouse. That evening, Edwards led the police to a rural area where Small's body was recovered. It appeared that Small had been placed in a wooden box which had been fitted with a PVC pipe designed to give him air for 24 to 48 hours. Small's wrists were handcuffed and the box was buried. The coroner later determined that his death was caused by "asphyxia due to suffocation." That same night, the police arrested Rish and held her at the station for questioning. Rish requested a specific attorney, J. Scott Swaim, who had previously represented her, and she was given an opportunity to obtain his counsel. Rish did not know that Swaim was friends with the victim. For the next four days, between September 4 and September 8, the police questioned Rish with counsel present. Eight statements were elicited concerning her knowledge and actions in the early days of September. None of the statements was totally consistent with any other.

== Rish trial ==
On October 1, Rish was charged by indictment with first-degree murder and aggravated kidnapping for her alleged role in Small's death. On November 2, 1988, Rish was tried by a jury. No direct evidence was presented linking her to the kidnapping or death of Small. However, the State was able to enter Rish's eight inconsistent statements into evidence. Witnesses were also presented who testified that they had seen her at various times with Edwards when he was purchasing some of items that were ultimately found with Small's body. Other witnesses reported that they had observed her at various related locations during the course of the kidnaping and ransom calls. Lastly, the State submitted evidence that Edwards had used their garage to build the box in which Small's body was found. The jury found Rish guilty on both counts, and the trial court sentenced her to a term of natural life imprisonment and a concurrent 30-year term. Rish was paroled in February 2022.

== Ryan commutation ==
On January 11, 2003, Illinois Governor George Ryan, a native of Kankakee, commuted all death row sentences in Illinois to life imprisonment. This act commuted the sentence of Danny Edwards who had murdered Ryan's next-door neighbor Stephen Small. This is what Ryan had to say about the Small case at the time of the commutation: "I grew up in Kankakee which even today is still a small midwestern town, a place where people tend to know each other. Steve Small was a neighbor. I watched him grow up. He would babysit my young children – which was not for the faint of heart since Lura Lynn and I had six children, five of them under the age of 3. He was a bright young man who helped run the family business. He got married and he and his wife had three children of their own. Lura Lynn was especially close to him and his family. We took comfort in knowing he was there for us and we for him. One September midnight he received a call at his home. There had been a break-in at the nearby house he was renovating. But as he left his house, he was seized at gunpoint by kidnappers. His captors buried him alive in a shallow hole. He suffocated to death before police could find him. His killer led investigators to where Steve's body was buried. The killer, Danny Edwards, was also from my hometown. He now sits on death row. I also know his family. I share this story with you so that you know I do not come to this as a neophyte without having experienced a small bit of the bitter pill the survivors of murder must swallow. My responsibilities and obligations are more than my neighbors and my family. I represent all the people of Illinois – like it or not. The decision I make about our criminal justice system is felt not only here, but the world over."

== Media ==
On February 19, 2018, James Patterson's Murder Is Forever on the Investigation Discovery channel featured the kidnapping and murder of Small in an episode entitled "Murder Beyond the Grave".

== See also ==
- List of homicides in Illinois
- List of kidnappings
- List of solved missing person cases
