= Karen McCarron =

American physician (born 1968)

Karen Frank-McCarron
- Born: Karen Frank; December 20, 1968 (age 57); West Germany
- Other name: Karen McCarron
- Education: University of Illinois Urbana-Champaign; Southern Illinois University School of Medicine
- Occupation: Pathologist
- Spouse: Paul McCarron (c. 1995–2006, div.)
- Children: 2
- Status: Incarcerated
- Conviction: January 17, 2008
- Criminal charges: First degree murder, obstruction of justice, and concealing a homicidal death
- Penalty: 36 years in prison, 30 months of supervised release after her prison term and a $25,000 fine

Kate McCarron
- Born: Katherine Marie McCarron; July 22, 2002; Peoria, Illinois, U.S.
- Died: May 13, 2006 (aged 3); Morton, Illinois, U.S.
- Cause of death: Suffocation
- Resting place: Resurrection Cemetery and Mausoleum, Peoria, Illinois, U.S.
- Known for: Murder victim
- Parent(s): Karen Frank-McCarron; Paul McCarron

Karen Frank-McCarron (born December 20, 1968) is a German-born American pathologist convicted in Illinois of first degree murder of her autistic daughter Katherine "Katie" McCarron.

== Background ==
=== Early life, education and career ===
Karen Frank-McCarron was born Karen Frank to Erna and Walter "Robert" Frank on December 20, 1968, in Germany. She graduated from Maine South High School in Park Ridge, Illinois and from Southern Illinois University School of Medicine in Springfield, Illinois in 1995 with a Doctor of Medicine degree. Frank-McCarron, a pathologist, worked at Methodist Medical Center and Proctor Hospital, both in Peoria, Illinois.

=== Marriage and family ===
Karen Frank met her future husband, Paul McCarron, when they were both students at the University of Illinois Urbana-Champaign. Frank-McCarron and Paul's first child, Katie (born July 22, 2002), was diagnosed with autism in 2004. In September of that year, Paul and Katherine moved to Apex, North Carolina to live with Paul's mother, so that Katie could attend The Mariposa School, a special education school for children with autism and related conditions, in Cary, North Carolina. Paul and Katie returned home to Illinois on holidays. Frank-McCarron, who was a pathologist with the Peoria-Tazewell Pathology Group, stayed in Morton, Illinois with their younger daughter Emily, and visited North Carolina occasionally.

After 20 months, Paul decided to return full-time to Illinois with Katie. Paul McCarron took her to their home in Illinois on May 3, 2006. On May 7, 2006, Paul returned to North Carolina to fulfill the last three weeks of his work commitment. Katie remained in Illinois under the care of her mother and maternal grandparents, along with her younger sister. In addition to her mother and grandparents, Katie had two paid, full-time caregivers.

=== Psychiatric issues ===
Frank-McCarron was a patient of a psychologist while she was a resident doctor at a medical clinic in Cleveland, Ohio. She had been prescribed antidepressants but apparently stopped taking them in early 2006. At trial, it was admitted into evidence that the psychiatrist she had been seeing from about August 2005 to February 2006 did not observe any delusional thinking in Frank-McCarron.

=== Katherine's murder ===
On the afternoon before Mother's Day, Saturday, May 13, 2006, Frank-McCarron killed Katie by suffocating her with a plastic bag. After killing her daughter, Frank-McCarron went to the grocery store to buy ice cream for herself. Hours later, Frank-McCarron told relatives what she had done. In the early morning of May 14, Frank-McCarron cut herself and took a non-fatal dose of Tylenol. While awaiting trial, Frank-McCarron was free on home confinement on $1 million bond.

=== Trial and aftermath ===
Frank-McCarron went on trial on January 7, 2008. Prosecutors said that before suffocating Katie, Frank-McCarron suggested institutionalizing her then-3-year-old daughter and putting her up for adoption. After a week-long trial, she was convicted of first degree murder, obstruction of justice, and concealing a homicidal death on January 17, 2008. Frank-McCarron was sentenced to 36 years in prison, 30 months of supervised release after her prison term and was ordered to pay a $25,000 penalty to the state of Illinois.

Paul filed for divorce from Frank-McCarron in Tazewell County, Illinois Circuit Court in 2006, citing "extreme and repeated mental cruelty." Frank-McCarron's parents Walter and Edna sued Frank-McCarron for money they loaned her for attorney fees during her January murder trial, and her parents won the lawsuit against her in December 2008.

In 2010, Frank-McCarron appealed her conviction to an Illinois appellate court but the appellate court upheld the original conviction. In August 2011, Frank-McCarron filed a petition for a new trial. In November 2011, her petition for a new trial was denied. She is serving her sentence at Logan Correctional Center in Lincoln, Illinois.

==== Media coverage and activist response ====
News articles and weblogs have emphasized the difficulties in raising a child with autism, and some suggested that Frank-McCarron may have been stressed by lack of support and dealing with Katherine's autism—even though at the time of Katie's murder, she had two paid, "full-time caregivers" in addition to being in a home with Frank-McCarron, Walter and Edna Frank and her younger sister. Katie's paternal grandfather, Michael McCarron, said:

This was not about autism. This was not about a lack of support.

A number of autistic people rallied in favor of a conviction of Frank-McCarron, and Katie's death garnered intense scrutiny within the autism rights movement and among disability advocates. Autism Hub held a memorial on May 24 and the disability rights group Not Dead Yet led the charge to reveal the facts of the case. The local media responded to advocates that criticize them for sympathetic reporting towards alleged perpetrators.

== See also ==
- List of homicides in Illinois
- Mortality of autistic individuals
