= John Agrue =

American serial killer

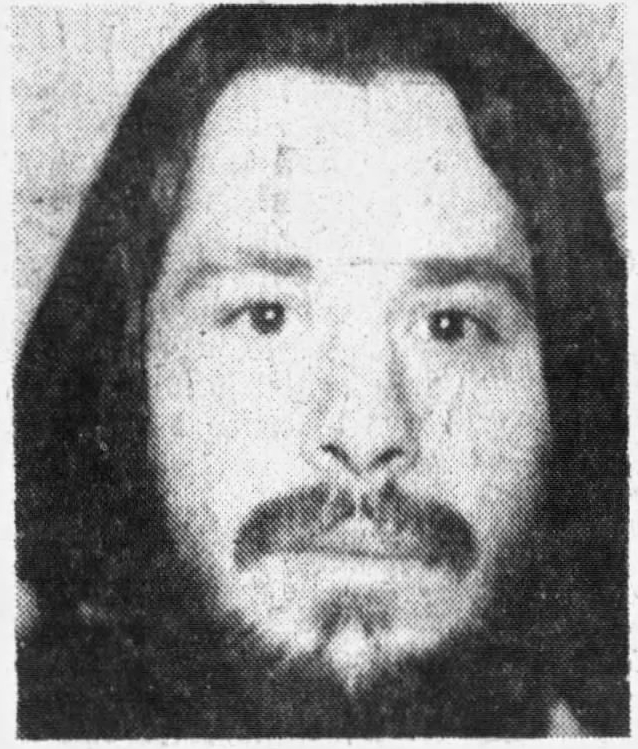
- Born: John William Agrue; September 11, 1947; El Paso, Texas, U.S.
- Died: June 29, 2009 (aged 61); Joliet, Illinois, U.S.
- Convictions: Murder (1 count); Kidnapping
- Penalty: 20-to-50 years imprisonment (Marino murder)

Details
- Victims: 2-3+
- Span of crimes: 1966–1982
- Country: United States
- States: Illinois; Colorado
- Date apprehended: For the final time on July 15, 1982

John William Agrue (September 11, 1947 – June 29, 2009) was an American murderer who was posthumously identified as a serial killer. He was convicted in 1966 of murdering his 15-year-old sister-in-law in Joliet, Illinois, and was later linked to a 1982 killing in Longmont, Colorado, after his parole from prison. He was arrested that year for an attempted kidnapping but was not charged in the Colorado homicide at the time due to a lack of evidence.

After his death in 2009, DNA evidence identified Agrue as the killer of 94-year-old Orma B. Smith, and authorities later named him the primary suspect in the stabbing death of Susan Becker. Based on these findings, investigators stated that he was responsible for multiple killings and reexamined other cases for possible links.

== Murder of Susan Marino ==
On July 21, 1966, an 18-year-old Agrue met with his 15-year-old sister-in-law Suzanne "Susan" Marino in downtown Joliet, Illinois and asked her to accompany him to Hammel Woods forest preserve. When they arrived there, he started making romantic advances towards her, but she rejected him. Angered, Agrue pulled out a small knife and stabbed her approximately a dozen times, killing her. Later that day, he admitted the murder to his wife, who initially did not believe his claims. To prove his guilt, he drove her to the crime scene and showed her where he had left Marino's purse and shoes.

After this, Agrue's wife urged him to surrender to the authorities. He instead went to a local church and confessed to a priest, who contacted authorities. Agrue was taken into custody two days later, and during subsequent interviews, he admitted that he had killed Marino because she opposed his advances towards her. Due to his confession and overwhelming evidence implicating him in the crime, Agrue was convicted and sentenced to a 20-to-50 year prison term at the Joliet Correctional Center.

=== Imprisonment, escape, and recapture ===
In December 1975, Agrue was transported to the University of Illinois Hospital in Chicago, where he was scheduled to undergo surgery to donate his kidney to his sister, Kathleen. About 50 prison employees volunteered to supervise him on their days off, as there were fears that he might use the opportunity to escape. The operation was delayed until May 4, and after the operation, he was ordered to remain there until he recovered.

On May 11, Agrue was reported missing from the hospital by one of the security guards. Earlier that day, he had escaped through a bathroom window and stolen a car, which he abandoned after crossing state lines. From there, he used two fake IDs, hitchhiked, and stole other cars during his travels through the various states, with his destination reported as California. About a week later, however, he was captured in Central City, Nebraska, after somebody reported that their car had been stolen. Agrue offered no resistance during the arrest, and was later extradited back to Illinois to serve the remainder of his sentence.

== Colorado murders and arrest ==
In January 1982, Agrue was paroled and decided to move in with relatives in Colorado. He initially lived in Boulder before moving to Longmont. In late June 1982, he encountered 20-year-old Susan Becker in the Boulder area. Authorities later identified Agrue as the primary suspect in her stabbing death, in which the victim sustained 13 stab wounds to the torso and neck. Her body was later found in the Boulder Canyon, where it was discovered by fishermen on July 1. While he was considered a suspect in her death, Agrue was not thoroughly investigated at the time and was eventually written off by investigators.

A week after the discovery of Becker's body, Agrue stabbed to death his neighbor, 94-year-old retired librarian Orma B. Smith, at her apartment in Longmont. He later discarded her body in the nearby Big Elk Creek Meadows, where it was found the next day. Six days after that, Agrue attempted to abduct a woman at knifepoint on the campus of University of Colorado Boulder, but was apprehended on the spot and jailed. At the time, he was publicly identified as a suspect in the murder of Smith, but prosecutors could not bring charges due to a lack of concrete evidence linking him to the crime.

== Imprisonment and release ==
In March 1983, Agrue was convicted of the attempted abduction and given a prison sentence but immediately returned to Illinois for a parole violation. He remained behind bars until 1989 when he was paroled yet again. This time, he decided to remain in Joliet, where he lived for the remainder of his life. After his last release from prison, Agrue was not linked to any violent crimes, although one of his neighbors reported that he had bragged about the murders in private and described other concerning behavior. Because of this, she sought to have a restraining order issued against him, which was not granted because Agrue had not harmed her personally.

== Death and identification ==
On June 29, 2009, Agrue was found dead at his home in Joliet, where an autopsy determined the cause of death to be an accidental overdose of prescription medication. While inspecting his home, relatives found women's purses and jewelry in his home, along with newspaper clippings about the attempted abduction and the murders of Becker and Smith. After his death, investigators from a cold case unit began testing his DNA to determine whether he was responsible for the murder of Smith decades prior. Nearly a year later, his DNA was matched to that of the Smith crime scene, with authorities announcing that they had officially solved the case.

At the time, he was considered a suspect in Becker's murder as well, but due to the lack of usable DNA in that case, they had to resort to other means of investigation to solve it. In May 2013, authorities announced that due to the similarity to Agrue's other known murders and other evidence that placed him near the crime scene, he was considered the sole suspect in Becker's murder. Investigators also consulted the FBI's Behavioral Analysis Unit, which concluded that it was highly probable that Agrue was responsible for Becker's murder, and the Boulder County District Attorney's Office stated that charges would have been pursued had he been alive. Because of this, Agrue was posthumously labeled a serial killer, with state police and the FBI announcing that they would be reviewing other cold cases to determine whether he was responsible for any further violent crimes.

As of January 2025, no other cases had been linked to Agrue.

== See also ==
- List of serial killers in the United States
- List of homicides in Illinois
