= Insight Hospital and Medical Center =

Coordinates: 41.8469°N 87.6210°W

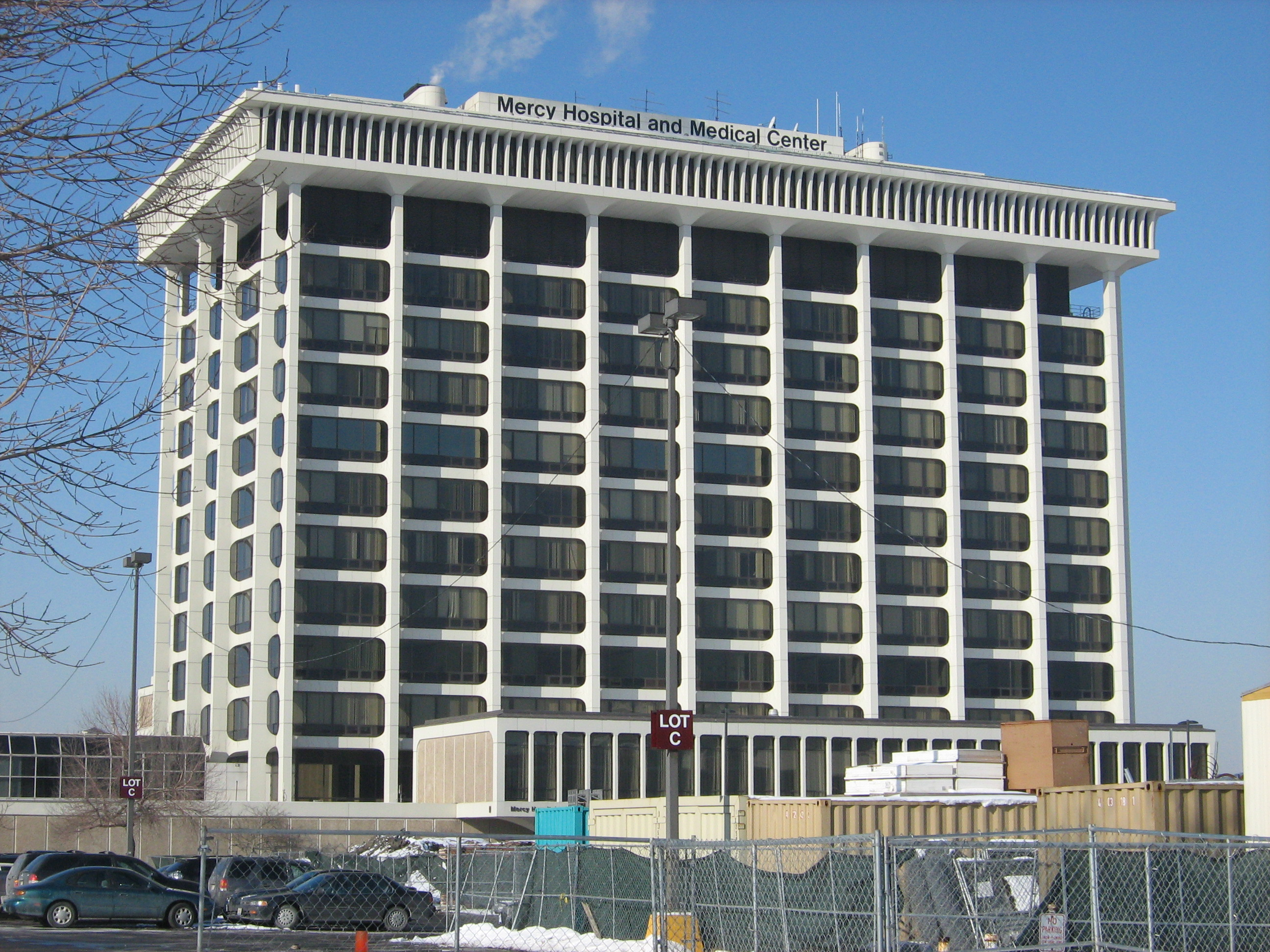

Geography
- Location: Bronzeville, South Side, Chicago, Illinois, United States

Services
- Beds: 414

History
- Founded: 1852

Links
- Website: Insight
- Lists: Hospitals in Illinois

Insight Hospital and Medical Center, formerly Mercy Hospital and Medical Center is a 414-bed general medical and surgical teaching hospital in Chicago, Illinois. Established in 1852, the hospital was the first chartered hospital in Chicago. In 1859, Mercy Hospital became the first Catholic hospital to affiliate with a medical school—Lind Medical School—and the first to require a graded curriculum. Since 2021, it has been owned and operated by Insight Medical.

== History ==
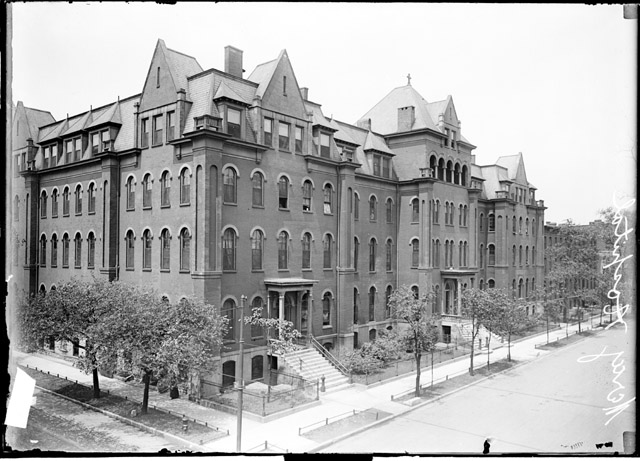
Mercy Hospital building located on 2537 S. Prairie Avenue (1910)

The Sisters of Mercy came from Ireland to the United States in the 1840s; six came to Chicago in 1846, establishing first a high school and then in 1852 a hospital at Rush Street and the Chicago River. It was the first chartered facility in Chicago. In 1859, Mercy Hospital affiliated with Lind Medical School, and was thus the first Catholic hospital to do so. It had moved to a building at Wabash and Van Buren Streets in the later-named Loop or central business district of Chicago. Then in 1863, it moved to 26th Street and Calumet Avenue in the Near South Side, a location considered rather far south at the time, away from the populace. The hospital was expanded in 1869, with its address on Prairie Avenue, a street just east of Calumet and running parallel to it, which proved timely when the Great Chicago Fire happened in 1871, located outside of the burned area but close enough to help fire victims.

While running for president in 1912, former President Theodore Roosevelt survived an assassination attempt by salon-keeper John Flammang Schrank in Milwaukee. After delivering his speech, he began to show the effects of shock and blood loss and was rushed to Chicago. Subsequently, Roosevelt was treated at Mercy Hospital.

In 1968, after planning a new and modern facility since the 1950s as the Stevenson Expressway was constructed one block to the north, Mercy Hospital opened in its present location on South Michigan Avenue, just west of its former location. The site extends from 25th to 26th Streets, and from Michigan Avenue east to Martin Luther King Drive. Then-Mayor Richard J. Daley aided the hospital in acquiring the site so that it continued to serve the city of Chicago.

Mercy was the hospital used by the Daley family: all of their seven children were born there. Robert Francis Prevost, the future Pope Leo XIV, was born at Mercy on September 14, 1955. Mercy sold a plot of land to the north of their hospital for $60 million in 2008.

Mercy is the main women's cancer center in Illinois. It accepted patients from Michael Reese Hospital and Medical Center and absorbed the ambulance routes when the hospital closed in 2008. In 2011, Mercy received a $66 million loan from the United States Department of Housing and Urban Development for a new cardiac unit.

On November 19, 2018, four people were shot and killed in or near the hospital, including the perpetrator.

In 2021, Mercy filed for chapter 11 protection with $100 million to $500 million in both assets and liabilities due to declining utilization which created excess inpatient bed capacity and increasing competition from local health systems.

== Accreditation and patients ==
Mercy is a Level 2 trauma center. The last year data were made available, Mercy Hospital and Medical Center had 16,359 admissions, 2,186 inpatient procedures, 3,973 outpatient surgeries, and its emergency department had 52,692 visits. The hospital is accredited by the American Osteopathic Association's Healthcare Facilities Accreditation Program. In 2012, Mercy Hospital and Medical Center was ranked #35 for all hospitals in the State of Illinois and #27 in the Chicago metropolitan area by U.S. News & World Report.

== Complaint for refusal to treat based on religious ethics ==
In June 2016, a woman filed complaints with the appropriate federal and state agencies against Mercy Hospital and Medical Center, for refusing to treat her although she was bleeding, cramping, and in pain after her IUD dislodged. The woman was unaware that the hospital was Catholic, and the doctor conferred with other doctors on staff as to what treatment was allowed. No treatment was given. The hospital follows policies set out by the United States Conference of Catholic Bishops as to limitations on medical care in conformance with their religious beliefs. Mercy Hospital stated that their protocol in caring for a woman with a dislodged or troublesome IUD would be to remove it, and that the doctor bore the responsibility for her refusal to administer the recommended medical treatment. The hospital pledged to review the training procedures for doctors on their staff.

== Purchase by Insight ==
Insight, a clinical technology company, has been the owner of Mercy Hospital and Medical Center since June 1, 2021. According to Bloomberg, they plan on injecting $50 million to the struggling hospital as part of a "comprehensive plan to increase services and meet community need." They have reported plans of reviving Mercy's status as a teaching hospital.

Recent History

In 2021, Mercy Hospital was acquired by Insight Chicago, a division of Insight Health Systems, and renamed Insight Hospital & Medical Center Chicago. Since the transition, Insight has undertaken a broad revitalization effort aimed at restoring critical healthcare services and strengthening its role as a trusted provider on Chicago’s South Side. These initiatives have included the reinstatement of ambulance services, the reestablishment of fully accredited residency programs in internal medicine and emergency medicine, and the expansion of both inpatient and outpatient services across a wide array of medical specialties. This includes emergency and trauma care, general surgery, orthopedics, neurosurgery, neurology, cardiology, women’s health, allergy and immunology, behavioral health, diagnostic imaging, laboratory testing, specialty pharmacy, and rehabilitative therapies.

Today, the hospital continues to serve the Bronzeville neighborhood and the broader Chicago area as a teaching institution and a vital member of Insight Health Systems, which operates facilities in Illinois, Michigan, and Iowa. Alongside its clinical services, the hospital supports a variety of community-based health initiatives focused on prevention, education, and addressing the social determinants of health.

One of its key community partnerships is with the Sylvester Broome Empowerment Village, a Flint, Michigan-based nonprofit dedicated to supporting youth and families through academic enrichment, creative arts, workforce development, and leadership in sports. Through this collaboration, Insight advances its broader mission to improve long-term health outcomes by investing in the stability, education, and well-being of the communities it serves. Additional outreach efforts include regular health fairs, neighborhood events, and programs that aim to expand care access and reduce disparities in historically underserved populations.

In May 2025, it was publicly recognized that Pope Leo XIV was born at the hospital, then operating as Mercy Hospital, on September 14, 1955. This moment of historical significance highlights the institution’s long-standing presence and enduring connection to both the city of Chicago and the broader global community.

== See also ==
- John Benjamin Murphy
