= Ricky Byrdsong =

American basketball coach (1956–1999)

Biographical details
- Born: June 24, 1956; Atlanta, Georgia, U.S.
- Died: July 3, 1999 (aged 43); Evanston, Illinois, U.S.

Playing career
- 1974–1976: Pratt Community College
- 1976–1978: Iowa State

Coaching career (HC unless noted)
- 1978–1979: Iowa State (grad assistant)
- 1979–1980: Western Michigan (assistant)
- 1980–1982: Eastern Illinois (assistant)
- 1982–1988: Arizona (assistant)
- 1988–1993: Detroit
- 1993–1997: Northwestern

Head coaching record
- Overall: 89–163
- Tournaments: 1–1 (NIT)

Ricky Byrdsong (June 24, 1956 – July 3, 1999) was an American college basketball coach and insurance executive. He served as the head men's basketball coach at the University of Detroit Mercy (1988–1993) and Northwestern University (1993–1997), compiling a career coaching record of 89–163. Byrdsong was the first African American head coach of the Northwestern Wildcats men's basketball program. On July 2, 1999, he was shot during a racially motivated killing spree and died the next day.

== Early life ==
Byrdsong grew up in Atlanta, Georgia, raised by his mother with his younger sister Marcia. He attended Frederick Douglass High School. Besides basketball, Byrdsong played the saxophone in the band, sang with the chorus and appeared in school plays. After graduation in 1974, Byrdsong accepted a basketball scholarship to Pratt Community College in Pratt, Kansas.

Byrdsong then played his final two seasons of college basketball for Iowa State University in Ames, Iowa under Coach Lynn Nance from 1976 to 1978. He was named team captain, but played sparingly for the Cyclones averaging 0.9 points and 0.9 rebounds in his career. After graduating from Pratt, Byrdsong had been offered scholarships from many schools, before choosing Iowa State. He said, "Then I went there and I never played. I probably was the only non-playing captain in Iowa State history. Total all my minutes in two years and it might equal two games."

However, after he graduated from Iowa State, Coach Nance asked Brydsong to consider coaching and then asked him to stay with the Cyclones as a graduate assistant. He accepted the advice and began his coaching career in 1978.

== Coaching career ==
In a ten year run as a college assistant, Byrdsong was an assistant at Arizona six seasons under Coach Lute Olson. Byrdsong was an assistant as the Wildcats advanced to the NCAA Final Four in 1988, after the program had been 4–24 in 1983. After the season he was offered the head coaching position at Detroit Mercy.

As coach for the Northwestern University Wildcats from 1993 to 1997, Byrdsong led them to a National Invitation Tournament berth in 1994, the second postseason appearance in school history, defeating DePaul University in the first round.

He had previously been head coach at the University of Detroit-Mercy (1988–1993) and assistant coach at the University of Arizona (1982–1988), Eastern Illinois University (1980–1982), Western Michigan University (1979–1980) and Iowa State University (1978–1979). After he left Northwestern, he worked as an vice president of community affairs for Aon Corporation until his death.

=== The walk on the wild side ===
On February 5, 1994, while coaching a game against Minnesota, Byrdsong abruptly left the game and joined the fans in the stands shaking hands, high-fiving the Minnesota Gopher mascot and taking an unticketed seat until removed by an usher. The team had started the season 9–0 but was at this point on a 9-game losing streak.

After returning to Evanston, Byrdsong's wife requested a leave of absence for the coach, to which Byrdsong remarked, "My wife, after watching me, obviously got concerned, now, any time I'm going to take a walk on the wild side, I should let her know."

== Personal life and death ==
On July 2, 1999, while jogging near his Skokie, Illinois home with his son and daughter, ages 8 and 10, Byrdsong was shot by Benjamin Nathaniel Smith, a member of the white supremacist Creativity Movement who went on a shooting spree that killed one person and injured ten others. Byrdsong died four hours later on July 3 at Evanston Hospital. Smith was a disciple of Mathew Hale, the leader of Creativity Movement, and his shooting spree took place two days after Hale was denied a license to practice law in Illinois. According to eyewitnesses, Smith pulled alongside Byrdsong and shot him multiple times. After Smith later shot and killed 26 year old Korean graduate student Won-Joon Yoon, Smith committed suicide on July 4 after he crashed his car into a metal post during a high-speed chase in Southern Illinois.

Byrdsong and his wife, Sherialyn, had three children: Sabrina, Kelley and Ricky Jr.

=== Media coverage and public reaction ===
A fair amount of media coverage was centered on the events of Byrdsong's death and his achievements as a former Northwestern basketball coach. In 2000, an award was created in his honor by the Illinois Fatherhood Initiative. Anya Cordell, Byrdsong's neighbor, wrote the anti-hate crime book Race: An Open and Shut Case. Cordell said that she was inspired by the urge to combat the hate that fueled Benjamin Smith's deadly shooting rampage. Byrdsong's children also received college scholarships from the Jewish Federation of Metropolitan Chicago, an organization which helps victims of families from hate crimes.

In 2009, a documentary about Byrdsong, entitled Fly Like the Byrd, was created by Northwestern students from the Medill School of Journalism. The 25-minute documentary examines race relations and how his legacy has lived on, ten years later.

== The Ricky Byrdsong Foundation ==
His widow established The Ricky Byrdsong Foundation. Its mission is to "arrest the growing epidemic of hate and violence in our society by and against our youth."

The foundation holds a number of events in and around Evanston; the most well-known is the Race Against Hate, a 5K running race held annually in late June in Evanston. The Race Against Hate race draws several thousand runners. In 2009, a 10,000-meter running race was added in honor of the 10th anniversary of the Race Against Hate.

== Head coaching record ==
Record table
| Season | Team | Overall | Conference | Standing | Postseason |
|---|---|---|---|---|---|
Detroit Titans (Midwestern Collegiate Conference) (1988–1993)
| 1988–89 | Detroit | 7–21 | 4–8 | 5th | |
| 1989–90 | Detroit | 10–18 | 3–11 | T-6th | |
| 1990–91 | Detroit | 9–19 | 2–12 | 8th | |
| 1991–92 | Detroit | 12–17 | 1–9 | 6th | |
| 1992–93 | Detroit | 15–12 | 7–7 | 4th | |
| Detroit: | | 53–87 | 17–47 | | |
Northwestern Wildcats (Big Ten Conference) (1993–1997)
| 1993–94 | Northwestern | 15–14 | 5–13 | T–10th | NIT Second Round |
| 1994–95 | Northwestern | 5–22 | 1–17 | 11th | |
| 1995–96 | Northwestern | 9–18 | 4–14 | 10th | |
| 1996–97 | Northwestern | 7–22 | 2–16 | 11th | |
| Northwestern: | | 36–76 | 12–60 | | |
| Total: | | 89–163 | | | |

== See also ==
- List of homicides in Illinois
