= Chicagoland (disambiguation) =

Chicagoland is the Chicago metropolitan area.

Chicagoland may also refer to:

- Chicagoland Speedway, a motorsports venue in Joliet, Illinois
- Chicagoland Sports Hall of Fame in Des Plaines, Illinois
- Chicagoland Chamber of Commerce
- Chicagoland (TV series), a 2014 CNN television series
- Chicagoland Vampires, a series of urban fantasy vampire novels

== See also ==
- Chicago (disambiguation)
