= Lynching of David Wyatt =

1903 lynching in Brooklyn, Illinois, US

David Wyatt was an African-American teacher in Brooklyn, Illinois. In June 1903, Wyatt was denied renewal for his teaching certificate by the district superintendent, Charles Hertel. After hearing about his denial, Wyatt shot Hertel and was immediately arrested in Belleville, Illinois. While in jail, a mob captured Wyatt, lynched him in the public square, and set his body on fire.

== Background ==
After receiving a master's degree from the University of Michigan, David Wyatt moved to Illinois. After serving as the principal for black schools in East Carondelet, Wyatt moved to Brooklyn, Illinois.

The predominantly black town of Brooklyn was considered to be "a safe haven and political powerbase for African Americans in the country and region." Here, Wyatt gained recognition as a community activist. As an active member in the Afro-American Teachers Association, Wyatt was well respected among the state's teachers as a "race educator". Having established himself as a school teacher, Wyatt also started a night-school for adults to address illiteracy in Brooklyn. Wyatt's teaching career in the Brooklyn school district spanned ten years until his lynching in 1903.

== Arrest of David Wyatt ==
In 1903, after ten years as a teacher in St. Clair County, Illinois, Wyatt sought to renew his teaching certificate. On June 6, Wyatt went to the St. Clair County superintendent Charles Hertel's office in Belleville, Illinois. Hertel denied Wyatt's request for renewal. Newspaper accounts claim that Hertel apologized, but refused due to Wyatt's history of "extreme cruelty to some of his pupils" during his career. Following Hertel's refusal, Wyatt shot the superintendent with a revolver.

At the time of Wyatt's arrival, Hertel had been in the school board office with his son and his assistant, George Fielder. Fielder apparently heard Wyatt shout, "Then, dam[n] you!, you'll never sign another!" Following the gunshot, Fielder entered the office and attempted to take the gun from Wyatt. This drew attention from outside Hertel's office, and within 15 minutes a crowd of more than 500 had gathered.

Having been drawn by the sound of gunshots, two police officers arrived and arrested Wyatt. The officers took Wyatt through the crowd and headed toward the jail four blocks away. As Wyatt was being taken away, rumors spread that Hertel's injuries had been fatal. Members of the growing crowd began to call for Wyatt to be lynched, shouting "Lynch him" and "Get a rope". Eventually, the officers made it safely to the jail, and Wyatt was placed in a cell.

== Capture and lynching ==
By the evening of June 6, 1903, Wyatt had been removed from Hertel's office and placed in a jail cell. While Wyatt sat in his cell, the initial crowd of 500 grew to an estimated four to five thousand people, many from areas of the county around Belleville. Despite Hertel's non-fatal injury, word of his death continued to spread through what was now a mob. Cries calling for Wyatt's lynching continued, as did the mob's growth. In between trips to nearby saloons, members of the mob armed themselves. They bought every revolver from a local hardware store, while another gave away handguns.

Watching the mob become more aggressive, Belleville mayor Frederick John Kern went to the steps of the jailhouse to plead with them to let legal authorities deal with Wyatt. Kern's efforts to calm the mob had the opposite effect: they threw rocks at him and attempted to storm the jailhouse. Kern fled into the jailhouse, leaving State's Attorney James Farmer and former judge M. W. Schaefer to deal with the mob. Farmer and Schaefer decided not to use force to stop the mob, and instead suggested the fire department use firehoses. Against Kern's approval, firefighters approached the crowd with hoses, but were "unwilling to spray a crowd composed of their fellow white citizens".

With Kern, Framer, and Schaefer at odds over what to do, the mob took matters into their own hands. Late in the night on June 6, a group of men and teenage boys entered the unattended jailhouse. The group broke open Wyatt's cell, dragged him through the crowded streets, and lynched him from a telephone pole at the center of the town square. As Wyatt's lifeless body dangled from the telephone pole, a fire was ignited beneath his feet. When the fire died down, Wyatt's body was cut down from the pole. After souvenirs had been taken, the police stepped in to take Wyatt's remains to a funeral home for "safekeeping". Wyatt's widow was allowed to claim the remains the next day.

== Responses ==
The African-American experience in Belleville, where Wyatt was lynched, was vastly different from that of his hometown of Brooklyn. Black residents were the majority in Brooklyn and "intimately wed to the town's power structure". Belleville in contrast had few black residents and a civil rights movement in its earliest stages. Despite being in the minority, there was a strong response from the black residents of Belleville.

Following the lynching, the Chicago Tribune printed an article describing the altercation between Wyatt and Hertel, and the resulting lynching. The article states, "The 500 negro residents of this city refuse to heed the warning to leave town. They persist in staying in spite of the lynching of Wyatt, although they know that their lives are unsafe while the present excitement lasts." In the days following the lynching, Belleville's black residents faced threats and harassment.

The white community of Belleville was divided in their reactions. While liberal citizens disapproved of what happened, many of the city's political and business leaders defended the lynching. Mayor Kern responded saying Wyatt alone was to blame. Facing criticism for his comments, Kern later took responsibility for the lack of police intervention. Kern feared a race war and his permissive policing strategy was intended to "protect the residents of Belleville in the face of civil unrest".

Wyatt's lynching also gained attention from outside the local community. Under the heading, "Illinois Lynching Horror", the New York Times stated, "The feeling against the 500 colored residents of the city is intense. Without exception, not one of them is safe in this city." Indianapolis's black periodical The Freeman feared that Wyatt's lynching may be used against the "stability, dignity, and respectability of all Negroes". Anti-lynching activist Ida B. Wells was quoted in the Chicago Tribune claiming that there was evidence to show Wyatt had actually acted in self-defense.

== Implications ==
The spectacle of Wyatt's lynching reflects many of America's racial conflicts of the late 19th and early 20th centuries. Professor and author Ashraf H.A. Rushdy argues that lynching "provided an opportunity for the entire society to situate the whole event in a variety of contexts—as a feature of race relations, a concern in domestic politics, or a consideration in international affairs". The lynching of David Wyatt is one example of the racialized mob violence taking place in the nation.

As an educator, Wyatt was a staple in the community. Since Reconstruction, black teachers "acted as community leaders, interracial diplomats, and builders of black institutions". Being a source of literacy, as Wyatt was, made many black teachers sources of leadership in growing African-American communities. Despite the respect given toward teachers within the black community, these men and women struggled to be shown the same respect from their white peers. From the 1890s through the 1950s, black teachers often relied on some form of "accommodationism". Black teachers often found themselves modestly seeking the respect of whites rather than demonstrating the "independence to risk being assertive and outspoken".

The altercation between Wyatt and Hertel arguably reflects Wyatt's disregard for the accommodation approach. Wyatt's lynching can be seen as what Rushdy calls, "the place racial lynching occupies among a panoply of social control strategies used to limit African American mobility (and life) in different historical periods".

== See also ==
- List of lynchings and other homicides in Illinois
- Danville race riot
- Lynching of Samuel J. Bush
