= Murder of Laree Slack =

2001 child murder in Illinois, United States

Laree A. Slack (July 4, 1989 – November 11, 2001) was a victim of child abuse by her parents that led to her death in the South Side, Chicago, United States. She died at age 12 after receiving a "Biblical whipping" with "an inch-thick section of rubberized electrical cable filled with strands of wire" repeatedly and died from internal bleeding several hours later.

== Trial ==
Her father, Larry Slack Sr., was convicted of first-degree murder in 2006 as a result of the beating. He received a life sentence for the murder and a 30-year sentence for aggravated battery of a child. The mother, Constance Slack, received a 25-year sentence after pleading guilty to murder. The beatings of Laree and her eight-year-old brother started because of a claimed failure to properly clear away laundry, leading to difficulty finding a credit card. The father's interpretation of Biblical injunctions regarding the punishment of children were a factor in the severity of the beating. The parents were devout Jehovah's Witnesses who home-schooled their six children. Investigators said the parents decided to administer Biblical discipline in the form of "40 lashes minus one, three times".

The crime was used as an illustration in the 2005 edition of the textbook Delinquency in society that an "intact two parent family" with strong religious values is not so important as having a "loving family" in preventing violence toward children.

== See also ==
- List of homicides in Illinois
