= Murder of Mary Stachowicz =

2002 murder in Chicago, Illinois

Mary Stachowicz (née Frank; 1951 – November 13, 2002) was a Polish American woman and mother of four, who on November 13, 2002 was murdered by Nicholas Gutierrez in Chicago, Illinois.

== Murder ==
On November 13, 2002, Stachowicz attended Mass at the Basilica of St. Hyacinth in the Chicago neighborhood of Avondale before beginning a favor as a Polish–English translator at the Sikorski Funeral Home, where Gutierrez worked as a janitor. Nineteen-year-old Gutierrez tipped police off when he speculated that he thought someone had killed her and stuffed her body in the building's crawlspace. He was working at the funeral parlor and had recently been laid off and was being evicted. Area 5 Cmdr. Lee Epplen of the Chicago Police stated that Stachowicz and Gutierrez got into an argument after the woman harangued him about his sexuality, calling him and his roommate derogatory names, police and prosecutors said. Gutierrez told police he became enraged after Stachowicz kept questioning him, said Cook County Assistant State's Atty. Nancy Galassini during a bond hearing. Gutierrez claimed that she proceeded to ask him, "Why do you sleep with boys?", after which he became even more angry and Nancy Galassini said, "The defendant punched and kicked and stabbed the victim until he was tired. He then placed a plastic garbage bag over her head and strangled her."

Gutierrez later concealed her body in a crawlspace under the floor. Prosecutors also accused Gutierrez of sexually assaulting Stachowicz, a charge that was denied by his defense attorney. In a confession videotaped by the Chicago Police, Gutierrez said he panicked because Stachowicz's trying to get him to change his sexuality reminded him of his mother. "She had this sneer, which reminded me of my mother when she used to beat me...I saw nothing but red," Gutierrez was reported saying in the Chicago Sun-Times. Later his defense attorney, Crystal Marchigiani, said that it was Gutierrez who had been physically attacked by Stachowicz, and that, "She could not leave him alone." Gutierrez was sentenced to life in prison on July 2, 2007. His defense attorney asked the judge to account for his childhood history of physical abuse, but Stachowicz' son was 100% convinced that Gutierrez should receive the death penalty.

== Aftermath ==
Stachowicz' murder is regarded to some people as an unrecognized hate crime. Groups such as Concerned Women for America have complained about the comparative lack of media attention given to the case which they believe meets the definition of a hate crime against Christians and heterosexuals.

Writer Rod Dreher has written about her death, arguing that it should receive the same level of media attention as the death of Matthew Shepard.

Catholic Bishop Thomas J. Paprocki, an auxiliary bishop of Chicago who knew Stachowicz personally, called her a "martyr for the faith". On the fifth anniversary of her death, Catholic journalist Phil Lawler called for the opening of a formal beatification process.

== See also ==
- List of homicides in Illinois
