= Danville race riot =

Racist incident in Illinois, US

The Danville race riot occurred on July 25, 1903, in Danville, Illinois, when a mob sought to lynch a Black man who had been arrested. On their way to county jail, an altercation occurred that led to the death of a rioter and the subsequent lynching of another Black man. At least two other Black residents were also assaulted. The rioters failed to overcome the police stationed at the jail, and the Illinois National Guard restored order the next day.

== History ==
A Black man, James Wilson, had been arrested for the rape of a white woman in Alvin, Illinois, north of Danville. A mob of about 600 whites formed to storm the county jail in Danville to kill Wilson. En route, they encountered another Black man, a native of Evansville, Indiana, who has been variously identified as J. D. Mayfield, John D. Metcalf, or Bud Fruit. In the ensuing altercation, he shot and killed 24-year-old Henry Gatterman, a member of the lynch mob, in self-defense. Mayfield was intercepted by police and was taken to the nearby police station. Officers barricaded the doors, but they were unable to hold back the mob. Mayfield was captured and taken to the spot where the altercation occurred. There, he was hanged on the nearest telephone pole.

After Mayfield died, the mob took down his body and brought it to the Danville public square in front of the county jail. The mob burned Mayfield's body, shot at it, and hacked it into pieces. The mob, which had grown to about 1,000 people, was able to batter the door of the jail down, but the sheriff and the deputies opened fire on them. Seven members of the mob were shot. The mob retreated and reorganized. Two miners from Westfield, Illinois brought dynamite to destroy the walls of the jail, but they were intercepted by police in Himrod.

The mob largely dispersed overnight, but two other unidentified Black residents were beaten with clubs and left in the street. Order was restored after the state deployed the 7th regiment of the Illinois National Guard. Danville Mayor John Beard declined to press any charges against the rioters. Nevertheless, 12 members of the mob were put on trial. In September 1903, 10 men, a juvenile, and one woman were convicted of charges ranging from rioting to assault with intent to commit murder. They received prison terms of up to 14 years. The remaining two, William Pettis and Cicero Davis, were allowed to plead guilty to rioting and each fined $200. As he sentenced them, Judge M.W. Thompson told the defendants that were fortunate to not be on trial for murder.

"You men may thank God you are not here on a charge of murder instead of an attempt to murder, and that I am not sentencing you to be hanged instead of to the penitentiary. For as sure as you live, had you gained entrance to the jail that night, you would have committed murder, not once, but probably a dozen times. If the right man had not been the sheriff, you would have succeeded."

Of the 10 men, seven, including the leader of the mob, Winfield Baker, served three years in prison, two served three years and nine months in prison, and one served seven years in prison. It is unknown how much prison time the woman and the juvenile served.

== See also ==
- List of race riot deaths and other homicides in Illinois
- Lynching of David Wyatt
