= Killing of Paul O'Neal =

2016 police killing in Illinois

- Date: July 28, 2016; 10 years ago
- Time: 7:23 p.m. to 7:25 p.m.
- Location: 7400 block of South Merrill Avenue, Chicago, Illinois, U.S.
- Type: Homicide by shooting, police killing
- Filmed by: Police body and dash cameras
- Participants: Jose Diaz (fired fatal shot); Michael Coughlin; Jose Torres
- Outcome: Coughlin and Torres fired in 2020
- Deaths: Paul O'Neal, aged 18
- Charges: None
- Litigation: Wrongful death lawsuit against the city of Chicago by O'Neal’s mother settled for $2.25 million

On July 28, 2016, 18-year-old Paul O'Neal was shot in the back by Chicago Police Department officers following a grand theft auto chase. O'Neal had struck two police cars, a parked car, while operating a stolen Jaguar. Police say that O'Neal, who was unarmed, fled from the vehicle after the chase and refused to stop. The shooting was classified by the medical examiner as a homicide. The three officers who discharged their weapons were removed from duty following a preliminary investigation. Following an investigation, no criminal charges were brought against the officers involved.

The Los Angeles Times notes Chicago's use-of-force policy specifically prohibits police from shooting into a car when the vehicle represents the only danger. However, this policy is not absolute and expressly applies "unless such force is reasonably necessary to prevent death or great bodily harm to the sworn member or to another person."

Chicago police released vehicle and body-worn camera video of the shooting on August 5, 2016. Prior to the release, the agency warned that civil unrest could follow.

In 2020, officers Michael Coughlin and Jose Torres were fired for their roles in the killing. Jose Diaz, however, was not fired. Later that year, the city of Chicago settled a wrongful death lawsuit filed by O'Neal's mother for $2.25 million (equivalent to $2.8 million in 2025).

== Shooting ==
At 7:23 p.m., Chicago police officers attempted to stop O'Neal in the South Shore neighborhood as he drove a Jaguar convertible reported stolen in Bolingbrook. O'Neal struck two Chicago police vehicles while in the car, and two officers fired at him while he was inside the car. O'Neal fled from the Jaguar, and a third officer chased him behind a home and fatally shot him. O'Neal died from a single gunshot wound to the back. About fifteen shots were fired in total by the three officers.

== See also ==
- List of unarmed African Americans killed by law enforcement officers in the United States
