= 1988 Chicago shootings =

Spree shooting in Illinois, US

- Location of Moses Montefiore Academy
- Location: 41.864°N 87.666722°W; Comet Auto Parts; 1334 S Ashland Ave; 41.8648643°N 87.6666240°W; Moses Montefiore Academy; 1310 S Ashland Ave; Chicago, Illinois, US
- Date: September 22, 1988 ≈10:00 a.m. CDT (UTC−5)
- Target: School staff, police officers, auto shop employees
- Attack type: Shooting spree; school shooting; mass shooting; mass murder
- Weapon: .38-caliber revolver
- Deaths: 5 (including perpetrator)
- Injuries: 2
- Perpetrator: Clemmie Henderson
- Motive: Unknown; possible psychological crisis

On September 22, 1988, in Chicago, Illinois, United States, 40-year-old Clemmie Henderson carried out a shooting spree that began at an auto parts store and ended inside Moses Montefiore Academy, a special education school across the street. Henderson fatally shot four people, including a police officer, a school custodian, and two auto shop employees, before being shot and killed by a wounded officer during a gunfire exchange inside the school.

== Background ==
Moses Montefiore Academy was a special-education school within the Chicago Public Schools system, located on the city's Near West Side. At the time, the school served 152 students with severe emotional and behavioral disorders and employed 19 classroom teachers and security officers.

The surrounding neighborhood was largely industrial, and Comet Auto Parts, a local auto shop, was situated directly across from the school.

=== Perpetrator ===
The perpetrator, Clemmie Henderson, had a history of behavioral and legal issues. Reports at the time indicated that he had been arrested in the past for battery, disorderly conduct, and illicit drug use, starting when he was 14 years old.

Acquaintances of Henderson had noted signs of anger and emotional instability. Henderson was a Vietnam War veteran who served as an infantryman from December 8, 1966, to April 24, 1970, before receiving a less than honorable discharge. David Finke, a friend of Henderson, believes that Henderson was disturbed by his military service. According to Henderson's family members, he was on medication for a mental illness he developed in Vietnam during his service. Other details surrounding Henderson's military career and its potential influence on the events remain unknown.

Documents from Henderson's apartment indicate that he worked as a hairdresser and model. According to law enforcement, there was no clear connection between Henderson and the school or the individuals he targeted.

== Shootings ==
The incident began around 10:00 am on September 22, 1988, when Henderson entered Comet Auto Parts and opened fire, fatally shooting the store owner and an employee, 41-year-old John Van Dyke and 26-year-old Robert Quinn. A third employee, Chris Ferguson, dodged Henderson's shots before running out the back door. Henderson walked out of the auto parts through a side entrance and wounded a garbage man's hand, Laplose Chestnut Jr. After leaving the auto parts store, Henderson crossed the street and approached Moses Montefiore Academy. Ferguson returned to the store and survived the attack without any injuries.

According to witness Reverend Clement Ferguson, (Note: Clement Ferguson is the father of Chris Ferguson. Both Chris and Clement Ferguson personally knew Henderson before the shooting.) Henderson reportedly said "Get out of the way, don't nobody move" upon arriving at the school. According to witnesses, Henderson threatened "to kill everybody I see". Henderson encountered 33-year-old Arthur Baker, a custodian who was outside unloading trash. He shot and killed Baker before entering the school building, where he then encountered two uniformed Chicago police officers who were coincidentally assigned to the school to take an unruly pupil home: Irma Ruiz, a 40-year-old officer, and her 38-year-old partner, Gregory Jaglowski. As Henderson entered the school hallway, he opened fire on the officers. Ruiz was fatally shot in the chest, and Jaglowski sustained serious injuries to both of his legs after being struck multiple times. Despite his wounds, Jaglowski returned fire and fatally shot Henderson in the chest.

In total, five people were killed during the attack: two auto shop employees, the school custodian, Officer Irma Ruiz, and Henderson himself. Two additional individuals, including Officer Jaglowski and the garbage man near the auto parts store, were wounded. No students or teachers were physically injured in the shooting, although several were present and in class during the incident and required counseling in its aftermath.

== Aftermath ==
The shooting drew national attention due to the setting—a special-needs school—and the death of a law enforcement officer on duty. Officer Irma Ruiz was recognized posthumously for her actions and became the first Latina officer in Chicago to be killed in the line of duty. Officer Jaglowski recovered from his injuries and was later honored for his role in stopping the attacker. Chicago police Superintendent LeRoy Martin commented on the sacrifices made by the officers, "Had my two officers not been there at the school to pick up a youth, had he (the gunman) not encountered them, I'm afraid we would have had a massacre. That officer (Ruiz) sacrificed her life."

Authorities determined that Henderson had used a .38-caliber revolver in the attack. Investigations revealed no definitive motive, although some reports suggested he may have been experiencing a psychological crisis. At the time, there was limited formal discussion in the public discourse about mental health as it related to acts of mass violence, but the incident did raise questions about how individuals with clear warning signs could gain access to firearms.

Following the shooting, security measures were reviewed at several schools within the Chicago Public Schools system. The attack also highlighted broader concerns about violence in and around educational institutions, particularly in urban areas. Several editorials and community leaders called for increased funding for school security and mental health intervention programs.

Irma C. Ruiz Elementary School, a public fine and performing arts cluster school in the Heart of Chicago neighborhood, was named in honor of slain officer, Irma Ruiz. Additionally, Walnut Park in the Archer Heights neighborhood was renamed to Irma C. Ruiz Park, shortly after the 30th anniversary of the attack.

=== Present site of Moses Montefiore Academy ===
Moses Montefiore Academy closed in 2016 due to lack of enrollment. The school was bought by Urban Prairie Waldorf School in 2018. The school closed again in 2024 for demolition. The site is set to be replaced by a new residential building.

== See also ==
- List of school shootings in the United States by death toll
- List of school shootings in the United States (before 2000)
- List of mass shootings in the United States
- List of mass shootings in the United States (1900–1999)
- List of homicides in Illinois
- List of school-related attacks
- 2008 Northern Illinois University shooting
