= Chicago Avenue (disambiguation) =

Chicago Avenue is a street in Chicago, Illinois, United States.

Chicago Avenue may also refer to:

- Chicago Avenue (Blacktown, New South Wales)
- Chicago Avenue (East Chicago, Indiana)
- Chicago Avenue (Evanston, Illinois)
- Chicago Avenue (Maroubra, New South Wales)
- Chicago Avenue (Minneapolis)
- Chicago Street (Hammond, Indiana)

== See also ==
- Chicago Road
