= Lynching of Samuel J. Bush =

1893 lynching in Illinois

- Date: June 3, 1893
- Location: Decatur, Illinois, United States
- Participants: Residents of Macon County, Illinois
- Deaths: 1

In the early hours of June 3, 1893, a black day-laborer named Samuel J. Bush was forcibly taken from the Macon County, Illinois, jail and lynched. Mr. Bush stood accused of raping Minnie Cameron Vest, a white woman, who lived in the nearby town of Mount Zion.

== Background ==
Lynchings are a form of extrajudicial killings—not protected or sanctioned by law—and are often considered a reaction to black emancipation as well as the danger black freedom supposedly portended. The historian Amy Louise Wood argues that the cultural power of lynching, and of white supremacy, "rested on spectacle...which produced and disseminated images of white power and black degradation, of white unity and black criminality, that served to instill and perpetuate a sense of racial supremacy in their white spectators." An effervescence of lynchings occurred throughout the United States from the Civil War through the 1940s. In 1919, the National Association for the Advancement of Colored People (NAACP) published a report on incidents of lynchings in the United States. The NAACP report found that 114 "colored" persons were lynched in 1893; down from 155 lynchings the previous year of 1892, though still one of the highest years of reported lynchings on record.

== Lynching ==
On the afternoon of June 2, 1893, Samuel J. Bush was taken by train to Decatur, Illinois, and imprisoned for the alleged assault of Minnie Cameron Vest. Upon his imprisonment, Bush hired Wilson B. Woodford, the only black lawyer in town, to represent him at various pre-trial hearings and, short of any plea deal, at his trial. On Saturday, June 3, 1893, a headline on the front page of the Chicago Daily Tribune read, "Lynching Threatened at Decatur: Mob Expected from Mount Zion to Hang the Negro, Sam J. Bush." Despite the clamor of an impending lynching, no attempt was made to move Bush or to disperse the large crowd assembled across the street from the jail. While in prison, Bush penned letters to his sisters, and to a cousin, Louis Collins, which were published in the Decatur Daily Republican. Bush wrote, "Now is the time of need ... Send the money to this Lawyer & he will clear me, if not I expect to be Linched."

By 6pm, a crowd of nearly 500 people had assembled near the jailhouse. Despite the rain, the number ballooned to one-thousand by early morning; a nearby salon and tobacco store remained open all night. Around 2am, a group of Mount Zion vigilantes stormed the Macon County jail. Having been refused entry, the group led by Charles B. Britton, William Vest, and Thomas Atterbury, smashed down the jail door. Earlier that day, Deputy Sheriff Henry Midkiff locked twelve guards in the cell block and hired four officers to supplement his force; Midkiff refused to surrender the jailhouse keys to the Mount Zion mob. William W. Mason, the Chief of Police, appealed to the mob, asking they see reason and respect the law. His pleas fell on deaf ears: "he was grabbed, kicked in the stomach, and thrown down the stairs." The guards in the cellblock made no efforts to resist the white mob. The prisoner, Samuel J. Bush, attempted to conceal himself inside a mattress, but was found, dragged naked outside, and brought to a telephone pole at the corner of Wood and Water streets, in front of the Brunswick hotel. William Vest forced Samuel J. Bush's head through a noose and asked if he had any last words. Bush tried to speak, but the rope was too tight; Vest loosened the noose and Samuel J. Bush said he wanted to pray. He took to his knees and addressed the mob, proclaiming his innocence and then told the assembled mob that he "hoped to see them again in heaven." Bush then asked God to "mercifully receive his soul in the land beyond trouble."

On Sunday morning, June 4, 1893, all three Decatur newspapers carried "An Open Letter to Decatur's Colored Citizens" in which Wilson B. Woodford condemned "the lawless mob of maddened men" who had murdered Samuel J. Bush. Woodford argued that the lynching was not an isolated incident, but rather part of the dominant strategy of racial repression. Denouncing the "daily occurrences of such depredations upon the race throughout the country," Woodford reminded blacks of "the littleness in which the lives and property of the race are held." Woodford proposed that they "devise ways and means to assist in bringing to justice . . . the cowardly mob of human fiends," at the "indignation meeting." Quoting the Scottish poet Robert Burns, Woodford concluded: "Let every negro with one spark of love for his race and its future, who believe 'a man's a man for all that and a' that,' and who, above all, loves its country and its laws," attend the Indignation Meeting.

== Reaction and aftermath ==
On June 5, 1893, 150 men answered Wilson B. Woodford’s clarion call against the dangers of lynching and the necessity for black mobilization.

Governor John P. Altgeld, in a proclamation published in the Chicago Daily Tribune on June 4, 1893, forcefully condemned the lynching of Samuel J. Bush, writing: "I hereby denounce this cowardly and diabolical act as not only a murder under our laws, but as a disgrace to our civilization and a blot upon the fair fame [sic] of our state. The prisoner was accused of the crime of rape, but stoutly protested his innocence. He was already in the custody of the law and no matter with what crime he was charged, and no matter whether he was guilty or innocent, he was entitled to a trial, a fair trial according to law. It must never be said that the laws of our great and proud State do not afford protection to all without regard to color or condition. I therefore call upon all officers of the law and especially of Macon County, as well as on all good citizens who respect law and cherish the honor of this State, to do all in their power to bring the leaders of this great crime to justice. I hereby offer a reward of two hundred dollars ($200) each for the apprehension and conviction of every man who helped to break the doors of the jail, overpower the officers, and drag out the prisoner, or who assisted in killing him."

The State's Attorney of Macon County, Mr. Miles, stated: "[we will] at once commence vigorous prosecutions against those who participated in the lynching of the prisoner Bush...The Officers were not to blame at all, as they were overpowered by the mob, who were strong numerically and well equipped with arms." Decatur Marshall and Chief of Police William W. Mason, was cited as attempting to prevent the lynching. However, his Deputy Sheriff, Henry Midkiff's, efforts were not mentioned by the Decatur Daily Review. members of The mob William Vest, Thomas Atterbury, Charles B. Britton Were found guilty and sentenced to death.

In the spring of 2016, students at Mount Zion High School created an exhibit on the Jim Crow era in the basement of the African-American Genealogical Society and Museum located in Decatur. In remembrance of the Jim Crow era, students crafted an exhibit on lynchings, including the first lynching in Macon County. The memorialization of the oppressed past—of histories hitherto elided—are gestures that may help "set the strife in order," as W. E. B. Du Bois wrote, "not with full content, but with growing dawn of fulfillment."

== See also ==
- List of lynchings and other homicides in Illinois
- Lynching in the United States
- Ida B. Wells
