= 334 Chicago =

Main-belt asteroid

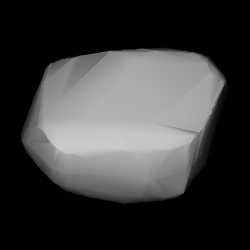
- Modelled shape of Chicago from its lightcurve

Discovery
- Discovered by: Max Wolf
- Discovery date: 23 August 1892

Designations
- Named after: Chicago
- Alternative designations: 1892 L
- Minor planet category: Main belt
- Adjectives: Chicagoan /ʃɪˈkɑːɡoʊən/

Orbital characteristics
- Epoch 31 July 2016 (JD 2457600.5)
- Uncertainty parameter 0
- Observation arc: 123.39 yr (45069 d)
- Aphelion: 3.98201 AU (595.700 Gm)
- Perihelion: 3.80814 AU (569.690 Gm)
- Semi-major axis: 3.89507 AU (582.694 Gm)
- Eccentricity: 0.022319
- Orbital period (sidereal): 7.69 yr (2807.8 d)
- Mean anomaly: 110.236°
- Mean motion: 0° 7^{m} 41.567^{s} / day
- Inclination: 4.64130°
- Longitude of ascending node: 130.179°
- Argument of perihelion: 148.310°

Physical characteristics
- Dimensions: 198.77±5.7 km 167.26 ± 7.27 km
- Mass: (5.06 ± 5.63) × 10^{18} kg
- Synodic rotation period: 7.361 h (0.3067 d)
- Geometric albedo: 0.041±0.013
- Spectral type: C
- Absolute magnitude (H): 7.7

334 Chicago is a very large main-belt asteroid. It is classified as a C-type asteroid and is probably composed of carbonaceous material.

It was discovered by Max Wolf on 23 August 1892 in Heidelberg.

During 1999, the asteroid was observed occulting a star. The resulting chords provided a cross-section diameter estimate of 174.1 km.
