= USS Chicago =

Four United States Navy ships have been named USS Chicago, after the city of Chicago, Illinois.

- USS Chicago (1885) was a protected cruiser launched in 1885 and active in World War I as a submarine tender, then a barracks ship, finally being renamed Alton in 1928 and lost at sea while under tow in 1936.
- USS Chicago (CA-29) was a Northampton-class heavy cruiser commissioned in 1931 and active in World War II, until lost at the Battle of Rennell Island in January 1943.
- USS Chicago (CA-136) was a Baltimore-class heavy cruiser, commissioned in 1945; later converted to an Albany-class guided missile cruiser and redesignated CG-11, then struck in 1984.
- USS Chicago (SSN-721) is a Los Angeles-class nuclear attack submarine commissioned in 1986, retired from active service in 2023.
