= Pinckneyville Correctional Center =

Prison in Illinois, United States

Coordinates: 38°05′07″N 89°19′39″W

- Interactive map of Pinckneyville Correctional Center
- Location: 5835 Illinois 154 Pinckneyville, Illinois
- Status: open
- Security class: Medium Disciplinary
- Capacity: 2827
- Population: 1756 (as of June 30, 2024)
- Opened: 1998
- Managed by: Illinois Department of Corrections

Pinckneyville Correctional Center is a medium disciplinary-security Illinois state prison located in the town of Pinckneyville in Perry County.

Pinckneyville first opened its doors in 1998, the facility consists of five general population housing units. As well as a reception unit, segregation, administration, health care unit.

== Notable Inmates ==
Inmate Name	Register Number	Status	Details
Christopher Vaughn	M33173	Serving 4 life sentences.	Convicted of the 2007 murders of his wife and three children.
