= 1999 Independence Day weekend shootings =

Shooting spree in Illinois and Indiana, United States

- Location: Chicago, Skokie, and Decatur, Illinois; Bloomington, Indiana
- Date: July 2–4, 1999
- Target: Jews, racial minorities
- Attack type: Spree shooting, drive-by shooting
- Weapons: Bryco .380-caliber pistol; Ruger .22-caliber pistol
- Deaths: 3 (including the perpetrator)
- Injuries: 10
- Assailant: Benjamin Nathaniel Smith
- Motive: White supremacy, antisemitism, racial hatred

During the weekend of July 4, 1999, white supremacist Benjamin Smith targeted ethnic and racial minorities (with victims including nine Orthodox Jews, two African-American men, and a Korean man), in a three-day drive-by shooting rampage in the U.S. states of Illinois and Indiana, after which he committed suicide. Smith was a member of the white supremacist World Church of the Creator.

== Events ==
Smith was a follower of the white supremacist organization now known as the Creativity Movement, and was a devoted disciple of the group's leader Matthew Hale. Two days after Hale was denied a license to practice law in Illinois, Smith loaded his light blue Ford Taurus with guns and ammunition and went on a three-day, two-state shooting spree, killing two people and wounding nine others.

On the evening of Friday, July 2, Smith shot and wounded nine Orthodox Jews in drive-by shootings in the West Rogers Park neighborhood of Chicago. Smith then shot and killed former University of Detroit Mercy and Northwestern University basketball coach Ricky Byrdsong, an African-American, in front of two of his three children, while they were walking outside Byrdsong's Skokie, Illinois, home.

The next day, Smith traveled to Urbana, Springfield and then Decatur, where he shot and wounded an African-American minister.

On Sunday, July 4, Smith traveled to Bloomington, Indiana, where he killed Won-Joon Yoon, a 26-year-old Korean graduate student in economics at Indiana University, who was on his way to the Korean United Methodist Church. Smith shot at but missed another nine people. On Sunday, July 4, fleeing the police in a high-speed chase on a southern Illinois highway, Smith shot himself twice in the head and crashed his automobile into a metal post. He then shot himself again, in the heart, this time fatally. He was pronounced dead at the hospital.

== Perpetrator ==
Benjamin Nathaniel Smith (March 22, 1978 – July 4, 1999) was born and raised in Wilmette, Illinois. He attended high school at New Trier Township High School. During this time he accosted a Skokie, Illinois, police officer and pleaded guilty to two counts of misdemeanor battery. He transferred to Mary D. Bradford High School in Kenosha for his senior year. He did not pose for a photograph in his senior yearbook, but in his class statement he wrote, "Sic semper tyrannis" (Thus always to tyrants). This phrase was shouted by John Wilkes Booth after he assassinated President Abraham Lincoln.

After graduating, Smith attended the University of Illinois at Urbana–Champaign. Smith dropped out of the university in 1998 after several conflicts with campus authorities. After dropping out, he transferred to Indiana University in Bloomington. Police reported that Smith was known for passing out hate-filled fliers against Jews, blacks and Asians on university campuses. In October 1998, Smith was the subject of a story on his university's public broadcasting station.

Smith was a follower of the white supremacist organization now known as the Creativity Movement, and was a devoted disciple of the group's leader Matthew Hale. Two days after Hale was denied a license to practice law in Illinois, Smith loaded his light blue Ford Taurus with guns and ammunition and committed the shooting spree.

== Aftermath ==
Around 2,000 people attended Won-Joon Yoon's memorial service at the Indiana University Musical Arts Center on July 12, 1999. Attorney General of the United States Janet Reno spoke at the memorial service. IU created a scholarship to honor Won-Joon. Every July 4, the Korean United Methodist Church holds an early morning service to remember Yoon who was murdered on his way to the church's Sunday service.

Ricky Byrdsong's widow established The Ricky Byrdsong Foundation to "arrest the growing epidemic of hate and violence in our society by and against our youth." The foundation holds a number of events in and around Evanston; the most well-known is the Race Against Hate, a 5K running race held annually in late June in Evanston. The Race Against Hate race draws several thousand runners. In 2009, a 10,000-meter running race was added in honor of the 10th anniversary of the Race Against Hate.

One of the victims has filed a lawsuit against the World Church of the Creator and its leader Matthew Hale, Smith's parents, and the person who has been charged with selling guns to Smith without a license.

On March 3, 2000, Donald Fiessinger, the 65 year old retired janitor who sold Smith the pistols he used, was sentenced to 11 months in federal prison, followed by 2 years of probation, for sellings firearms without a license.

A chapter of Lone Wolf (a study of spree killers), by Pan Pantziarka, is devoted to Smith and his crimes. Invisible Revolution, a documentary by filmmaker Beverly Peterson, features an interview with Smith less than two weeks before his killing spree. The film includes scenes of Smith distributing World Church of the Creator leaflets in his home town and saying, "If they violate our constitutional rights and say we can't put out our literature, we have no choice but to resort to acts of violence and really to plunge this country into a terrorist war they've never seen before."

== See also ==
- Los Angeles Jewish Community Center shooting, another attack that same year
- Antisemitism in the United States in the 21st-century
- Pittsburgh synagogue shooting
- Poway synagogue shooting
- History of antisemitism in the United States
- List of rampage killers (religious, political, or ethnic crimes)
- List of multiple homicides in Illinois
