= Duck Walk Killer =

Unidentified spree killer

- Other name: Rogers Park Killer
- Status: Unidentified
- Reward amount: $155,000
- Wanted by: Chicago Police Department

Details
- Victims: 2
- Date: September 30 – October 1, 2018
- Country: United States
- Locations: Rogers Park, Chicago, Illinois
- Weapon: Firearm

The Duck Walk Killer is an unidentified spree killer who murdered at least two men in the Rogers Park neighborhood of Chicago, Illinois, in 2018.

== Victims ==
Douglass Watts, 73, was shot in the head at point blank range while walking his dog on the morning of Sunday September 30, 2018. On the evening of October 1, 2018, 24-year-old Eliyahu Moscowitz was shot in the head at point blank range while walking home. Investigators were unable to determine a motive for either of the killings, and neither victim had been robbed.

== Police involvement ==
Forensic ballistic analysis was able to determine that the same gun was used in the two killings, which occurred on consecutive days only about a half a mile away from each other. This realization sent the quiet residential Rogers Park community into a state of panic. The police obtained surveillance video of a suspect who is believed to be responsible for the crimes. Police urged local residents to keep their eyes out for someone who walks with the suspect's "distinctive toes pointed out" gait. This led media organizations to dub the suspect the "Duck Walk Killer." The Duck Walk Killer has been seen in a ski mask and all black clothing. The police and news outlets have circulated a photo of the suspect.

No arrests have been made, and the Duck Walk Killer remains at large. The police maintain that no motive has been established.

The gun that was used in the two killings was used in two subsequent shootings on Chicago's West Side. The police have not determined if the subsequent shootings involved the same shooter.

== Reward ==
The community quickly raised a $23,000 reward for information leading to the arrest and conviction of the Duck Walk Killer. After several weeks without an arrest, the reward was increased to $150,000. This is the largest reward ever raised by a community in the city of Chicago for the capture of a single killer.

== See also ==
- List of homicides in Illinois
