= Mercy Hospital shooting =

2018 shooting attack in Illinois, U.S.

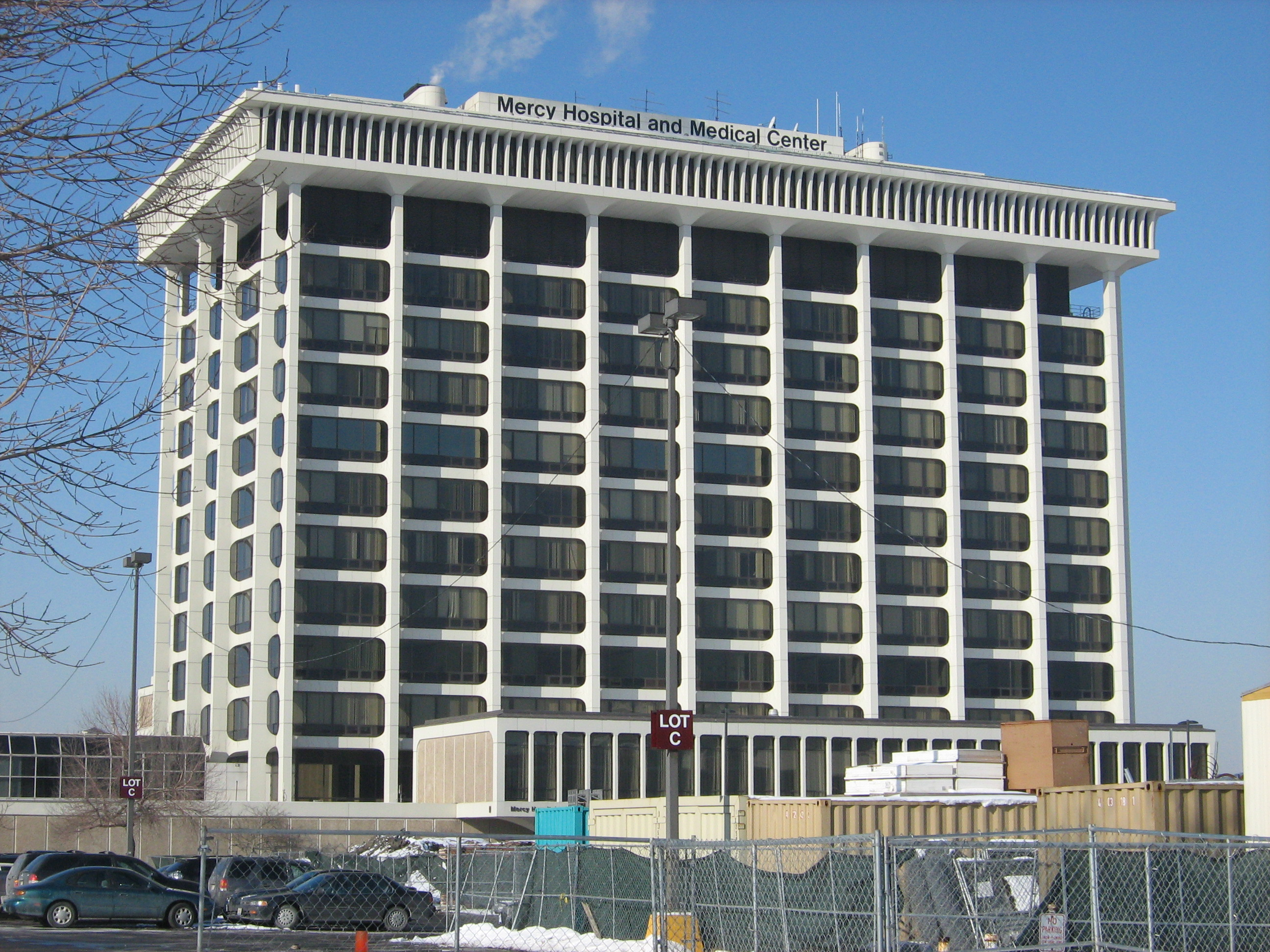
- Mercy Hospital and Medical Center in 2008
- Location: 41.8469°N 87.6228°W; Mercy Hospital and Medical Center, 2525 S. Michigan Avenue, Chicago, Illinois, United States
- Date: November 19, 2018; 3:00 – 3:30 p.m. (CST, UTC−6)
- Attack type: Uxoricide, shootout
- Weapon: 9mm Glock 17
- Deaths: 4 (including the perpetrator)
- Perpetrator: Juan Lopez
- Motive: Domestic violence

On November 19, 2018, a shooting incident occurred at Mercy Hospital and Medical Center in Chicago, Illinois. An attending physician at the hospital, a police officer, and a pharmacy resident were killed. The gunman, later identified as Juan Lopez, the ex-fiancé of one of the victims, later died in a shootout with other responding officers.

== Incident ==
The incident occurred between 3:00 p.m. and 3:30 p.m. The incident began in the parking lot of the hospital before moving inside. Police told the media that a confrontation in the parking lot between an emergency room doctor and her ex-fiancé escalated. The doctor, identified as Tamara O'Neal, 38, was killed by the gunman in the parking lot. An eyewitness claimed that O'Neal ran over to the group for help, and was on her phone attempting to call 9-1-1, and told them that the gunman would kill her. The witness also claimed that the gunman demanded a ring from O'Neal, and returned with a gun and shot her six times when it emerged she did not have the ring. Local officers have classified the killing of O'Neal as domestic violence.

He continued into the hospital and shot others. Police arrived and exchanged fire with the gunman, who retreated into the hospital and was pursued by officers. The gunman fired about 40 shots during the shooting.

A police officer was transported to the University of Chicago Medical Center in critical condition, where he later died. He was identified as 28-year-old Samuel Jimenez. The other two victims were identified as O'Neal and 24-year-old Dayna Less, a pharmacy resident. The gunman also died following the shootout with police. The incident was the deadliest shooting at a U.S. hospital in at least 16 years.

At 4:40 p.m., police had secured the location and all patients were safe.

Jimenez died from a bullet to the neck, Less died from multiple bullets, and the assailant shot himself in the head, but ultimately died from a police bullet to the abdomen.

== Perpetrator ==
Local authorities identified the perpetrator as Juan Lopez, a 32-year-old male, and the former fiancé of O'Neal. He was discovered within the hospital at around 3:20 p.m., shot in the head.

Lopez had a valid FOID (Firearm Owners Identification) card and a concealed carry gun permit. In the five years prior to the shooting, he purchased four weapons.

Lopez had previously threatened to shoot up the Chicago Fire Academy after he had been terminated as a trainee there for improper conduct toward women, and aggressive and improper conduct, five years previous. In 2014, during a separation proceedings, Lopez's wife at the time filed a petition for an order of protection against him, alleging threats and harassment by Lopez, as well as Lopez's unsafe and threatening conduct with a gun.

== Response ==
The hashtag #ThisIsOurLane was seen on social media after the shooting with multiple medical professionals rallying for support for those in the hospital, and some echoed anti-gun sentiments as well. The flag of Chicago outside local police stations was lowered to half staff in honor of the killed police officer, and the Chicago Police Memorial Foundation has announced plans to aid in funeral and educational expenses for his family.

== See also ==
- List of homicides in Illinois
