= Moses Montefiore Academy =

Location
- 1310 South Ashland Avenue; Chicago, Illinois 60608; United States
- Coordinates: 41.8647°N 87.6668°W

Information
- School type: Public
- Founded: 1929
- Closed: June 2016
- School district: Chicago Public Schools
- Grades: 5–12
- Gender: Coed
- Campus type: Urban
- Mascot: Mavericks

Moses Montefiore Academy (also known as Moses School or simply Montefiore) was a special school of the Chicago Public Schools (CPS). Established in 1929, The school was located Near West Side of Chicago, Illinois and served students with severe emotional disorders. The school closed in 2016, with the building being torn down in 2024.

== Background ==
In 2010, the school had 62 students in grades 5–8. Prior to 2010 there had been a decline in enrollment and Micah Maidenberg of the Chicago Journal wrote that "Staff and administrators at Montefiore had feared closure". In 2010 CPS announced plans to add a high school division to Montefiore with a plan to make it a 6-12 school; at the time the district administration was recommending Bartholome De Las Casas Occupational School, which had 82 students, for closure. Ron Huberman, the CEO of CPS, stated that the Montefiore facility is superior to the De Las Casas facility for special education. Vice made a documentary series on the school, titled "Last Chance High."

As of April 2015, most Montefiore students had been expelled from other schools due to violent behavior. As of 2015 it served grades 7–9. As of August 2015, the Chicago Public Schools eliminated all students and most staff from the school (except an assistant principal and a clerk), but claimed that the school was not closed.

According to "Last Chance High" the parents were told the school was closed while the teachers were told they were getting more students in 2016. This was done so that no parents would know to show up for the "public hearings" to decide if the school should be shut down. Since no parents were told about public hearings or that the school was technically still open, they were forced to either put their children back into public schools where they were expelled from previously or pay for private therapeutic schools. The Chicago public school district stated that letters went sent to the parents regarding when hearings would be held but no parents ever received these letters. The school closed in 2016 and had been bought by another private school known as the Urban Prairie Waldorf School that opened in 2018 before it too shut down in June 2024. Teachers and administrators in the Chicago Public Schools often used the threat of "being sent to Montefiore" as an effective disciplinary tool. As of September 2024, the Montefiore Academy's building has been torn down, set to be replaced by new residential development.

=== 1988 shooting ===
On September 22, 1988, 40-year-old Clemmie Henderson shot and killed officer Irma Ruiz and wounded her partner Gregory Jaglowski in the school. Also killed at the school was Arthur Baker, a custodial worker for the school, who was unloading trash when the gunfire erupted. Earlier, Henderson killed two people at Comet Auto Parts before arriving at Moses Montefiore. The shooting spree left five dead, including Henderson, who was shot dead by Jaglowski, and two others wounded.
