= Bruce Alan Davis =

American serial killer

- Born: September 3, 1948; Toledo, Ohio, U.S.
- Died: December 12, 1988 (aged 40); Chester Mental Health Center, Chester, Illinois, U.S.
- Cause of death: Suicide by hanging
- Convictions: District of Columbia; Involuntary manslaughter Illinois; Murder (2 counts)
- Penalty: District of Columbia; 5 to 15 years imprisonment Illinois; Life imprisonment

Details
- Victims: 3 to 33
- Span of crimes: 1971 – 1982 (confirmed)
- Country: United States
- States: Illinois and District of Columbia (others confessed)
- Date apprehended: For the final time on October 31, 1982

Bruce Alan Davis (September 3, 1948 – December 12, 1988) was an American serial killer who was convicted of killing three people in Illinois and the District of Columbia from 1971 to 1982, but confessed to thirty additional murders committed across the country. A majority of these confessed crimes were never confirmed, and Davis later hanged himself while serving his life term.

== Biography ==
Little is known of Davis' early life. He was born on September 3, 1948, in Toledo, Ohio, but his family moved to rural Fayette County, West Virginia, in the early 1950s. In 1961, the 13-year-old Davis became the victim of sexual abuse, from which he developed an intense hatred towards pedophiles and homosexuals.

Aside from this incident, he was renowned for his passions for music and singing, to which he was so dedicated that his schoolwork suffered as a result. Because of this, Davis decided to drop out of school and move to New York City, where he settled in Manhattan and planned to become a singer. While he managed to graduate from Washington Irving High School, he failed to kickstart a profitable career and instead became a drifter who survived by doing low-skilled labor, odd jobs and the occasional petty thefts.

== Known victims ==
In February 1972, Davis was arrested in Washington, D.C. and charged with the murder of James Earl Hammer, a local businessman and a friend of his. At the trial, his attorneys convinced the jury that the killing was not premeditated, due to which Davis was convicted of involuntary manslaughter and sentenced to 15 years imprisonment with a chance of parole after five years.

While serving his sentence, prosecutors from Chicago charged him with the murder of 44-year-old Reverend Carlo Barlassina, who was killed in a hotel on June 29, 1971, and several checks and $1,000 were stolen from him. At the time of his death, Barlassina, an ordained Barnabite and head preacher of the Our Lady of Fatima Shrine in Niagara Falls, New York, was travelling towards San Diego, California on an assignment to the "Our Lady of the Rosary Church" and was stopping by in Chicago.

On November 28, Davis was extradited to Illinois and charged with the murder, to which he pleaded guilty and was subsequently convicted on December 17. He was sentenced to 25 to 45 years in prison. After his conviction, Davis was transferred to serve his sentence at a federal prison in Terre Haute, Indiana, where he remained until 1979, when he was moved to the Menard Correctional Center in Chester, Illinois.

=== Escape from Menard ===
During his incarceration, Davis was considered a model inmate due to his good behavior and participation in various rehabilitation programs. Due to this, he had his sentence reduced in the early 1980s, and was even allowed to work as a loader and handyman on the prison farm on a sector with minimal security. Using this to his advantage, he attempted to escape on October 24, 1982, by cutting a hole in the prison fence and breaking through it. On the way, he used an axe to kill 52-year-old Joseph Cushman, a warden, before stealing his truck and escaping the prison.

== Arrest and confessions ==
In the days following his escape, Davis fled to Smithers, West Virginia, but was soon arrested on October 31 after he was caught attempting to steal a car. Following his arrest, he was subjected to a two-week long interrogation, during which he unexpectedly confessed to committing a total of 33 murders from 1969 to 1971 in a variety of places. According to his claims, the majority of them took place in the District of Columbia and New York City, with additional victims in Reno and Las Vegas, Nevada; Los Angeles and San Francisco, California; New Orleans, Louisiana; San Juan, Puerto Rico; Boston, Massachusetts; Fort Lauderdale, Florida; Arlington County, Virginia; New Jersey; Kentucky and New Hampshire.

Davis claimed to have shot, stabbed and poisoned 12 gay men from D.C. - four within Arlington County and eight in the District, particularly within the Georgetown neighborhood, before dumping their bodies into the C&O Canal. His testimony was supported by great consistency in detail, geographic locations and time, which led some of the investigators to consider his confessions credible, with an investigator from Illinois, Nick Howell, verifying his potential guilt in at least five killings in his state. At the same time, other parts of his claims were questioned: for example, he claimed that he had either wounded or killed four gay men in separate incidents near the Iwo Jima Memorial in Arlington County, but investigators were unable to uncover any such cases. According to Davis himself, he spent most of his free time frequenting neighborhoods and gay bars where, using his good looks and charm, he convinced patrons to let him stay at their apartments before inevitably killing them. On other occasions, he claimed to have lured acquaintances to secluded areas where he robbed and killed them. Davis claimed that he felt remorse for what he had done, and that was why he decided to confess.

Due to his transient lifestyle from 1969 to early 1972, the authorities were unable to account for much of his travels, which was further soured by the fact that parts of Davis' testimony were found to either be inconclusive or conflicting. It was later found out that between 1969 and 1971, he worked as a librarian in Maryland and attended an adult teaching course at the University of Maryland, College Park.

Despite his dubious credibility, officials from New York City stated that they were able to confirm his involvement in the five slayings he had admitted committing in their jurisdiction. The details of most of these killings were never disclosed to the public, and remain secret to this day. The only killing publicly linked to Davis was the May 1970 murder of 27-year-old Eric Tcherkezian, a vocal teacher who was strangled with a belt in his room at the Ansonia Hotel in Broadway. In mid-November 1982, Daniel F. McMahon, a detective with the NYPD, confirmed that Davis had indeed provided details only the killer would have known.

== Trial, imprisonment and suicide ==
In spite of his many confessions, it was ultimately decided that Davis should first be tried for the murder of Cushman, a decision that was supported by United States Attorney General William French Smith. In July 1983, Davis entered an insanity plea for Cushman's murder, and while a psychiatric reevaluation determined that he indeed suffered from a disorder, he was still able to tell right from wrong. Because of this, he was subsequently convicted and sentenced to life imprisonment without parole. He was never charged with any additional murders.

After his conviction, Davis was transferred to the Chester Mental Health Center, the state's only maximum-security psychiatric facility. While he received proper treatment and medication, his mental state continued to rapidly decline. On December 12, 1988, Davis was found dead in his cell, having hanged himself through improvised means.

== See also ==
- List of serial killers in the United States
