= Milton Johnson =

American serial killer (born 1950)

- Illinois Dept. of Corrections inmate photo
- Born: May 15, 1950; Joliet, Illinois, U.S.
- Died: May 16, 2025 (aged 75); Menard Correctional Center, Chester, Illinois, U.S.
- Other names: The Morning murderer The Weekend murderer
- Convictions: Murder (5 counts); Attempted murder Rape (2 counts); Deviate sexual assault Burglary; Aggravated battery
- Penalty: Death; commuted to life imprisonment

Details
- Victims: 14
- Span of crimes: June 25 – August 25, 1983
- Date apprehended: March 9, 1984
- Imprisoned at: Menard Correctional Center

Milton Johnson (May 15, 1950 – May 16, 2025), known as The Weekend Murderer, was an American serial mass murderer who was believed to have committed up to 14 murders that occurred in Will County, Illinois during the summer of 1983. Two of the victims were police officers. Johnson had been on parole for aggravated battery, burglary, and rape at the time of the murders, and had been imprisoned from 1970 to 1983.

== Victims ==
Milton Johnson was linked to the following murders.

- Zita Blum, 66 - June 25, 1983
- Honora Lahmann (Blum's sister), 67 - June 25, 1983
- Kenneth Chancellor, 34- July 2, 1983
- Terri Lynn Johnson, 19 - July 2, 1983
- George Kiehl, 24 - July 16, 1983
- Cathleen Norwood, 25 - July 16, 1983
- Richard Paulin, 32 - July 16, 1983
- Denis Foley, 50 - July 16, 1983
- Steven Mayer, 22 - July 16, 1983 (Note: Foley and Mayer were Will County Auxiliary Deputys)
- Anthony Hackett, 18 - July 17, 1983
- Marilyn Baers, 45 - August 20, 1983
- Barbara Dunbar, 38 - August 20, 1983
- Anna Ryan, 75 - August 20, 1983
- Pamela Ryan, 25 - August 20, 1983

Of these murders, Johnson was convicted of killing Hackett, Baers, Dunbar and the Ryans. The latter four victims were killed at the Greenware by Merry Ceramic shop.

== Death ==
Johnson died in prison on May 16, 2025, at the age of 75.

== See also ==
- List of serial killers in the United States
- List of serial killers by number of victims
