= Lester Harrison (serial killer) =

American serial killer (born 1922)

- Mug shot of Harrison
- Born: June 7, 1922 (age 104); Mississippi, U.S.
- Other names: Sylvester B. Hudson; James Bonde
- Conviction: N/A (Not guilty by reason of insanity)
- Penalty: Involuntary commitment

Details
- Victims: 5–7
- Span of crimes: 1951; 1970 – 1973
- Country: United States
- State: Illinois
- Date apprehended: For the final time on August 13, 1973

Lester Harrison (born June 7, 1922) is an American serial killer who killed between four and six women in the area of Grant Park in Chicago, Illinois, from 1970 to 1973. An ex-criminal who was found not guilty by reason of insanity for a 1951 prison murder, Harrison admitted responsibility for four of the latter killings, but was again ruled to be incapable of standing trial and instead interned at a mental health facility, where he remained as of 1986.

== Early life, first murder, and release ==
Not much is known of Harrison's early life. Born in a family with several brothers and sisters, he began to exhibit signs of mental illness in the late 1930s, around the same time he began committing small-time crimes. In 1945, Harrison was arrested and later convicted on robbery charges, for which he was sentenced to 5 to 10 years in prison.

While serving said sentence at the Southern Illinois Penitentiary in Chester (now known as the Menard Correctional Center), Harrison beat to death another inmate, 28-year-old Norman E. Kimme, on August 10, 1951. Kimme, a Navy veteran who was serving a 14-year sentence for murdering his girlfriend, was found in the engine room of one of the prison buildings, having been battered on the head several times with an iron rod. During the subsequent investigation, Harrison admitted to the crime and was charged with murder, but a medical examination found him to be insane at the time of the trial, much to the objections of State Attorney John Heuer, who claimed that he was sane at the time he had committed and confessed to the crime.

As a result, Justice Quentin Spivey ordered that Harrison be sent for psychiatric treatment at the security hospital of the Menard State Penitentiary. After spending some time there, Harrison was declared "cured" and released, with the institution's staff believing that he no longer posed a danger to those around him.

Despite the positive psychiatric reports, Harrison continued his criminal lifestyle, garnering a total of eight additional arrests between the late 1950s and early 1971 on charges including theft, attempted armed robbery, unlawful possession of a weapon, assault causing actual bodily harm, and public indecency. For these crimes he was served short prison sentences on four occasions, paid fines in two others, and for the remaining two was found incapable of standing trial and instead sent to psychiatric wards for treatment. While incarcerated he lived off his disability checks, drank alcohol, and exhibited a heightened sex drive, which led him to develop an interest in viewing and collecting pornographic photographs and videos. In addition, when he was out of prison, he began to frequently visit Grant Park to hook up with various women.

In early 1971, he was once again arrested for theft under the name Sylvester B. Hudson and ordered to undergo a competency hearing; this time, the examining psychiatrist, Dr. Edward J. Kelleher, diagnosed him as a paranoid schizophrenic, but otherwise sane to stand trial. Due to this, Harrison was charged, convicted and sentenced to spend a year and 18 months in prison. However, Harrison was almost immediately released in the courtroom with time served, as he had already spent most of his sentence at the Cook County Jail.

== Murders in Grant Park ==
On the evening of July 19, 1970, 46-year-old Agnes Lehmann, a homeless woman living in the skid row area of Chicago, was found raped and beaten to death. That same night, 31-year-old factory worker Wilbur McDonald, who had no criminal record, was found beaten unconscious in another section of Grant Park, having suffered from fractures on the skull and most of his teeth having been knocked out. After receiving medical attention, he claimed that he had been beaten and robbed by an unknown assailant as he crossed the park's grounds. While investigating the Lehmann crime scene, police found McDonald's shoes several feet away from the woman's body, making him a suspect in the killing. McDonald was eventually arrested, charged, and ultimately convicted of Lehmann's murder purely on circumstantial evidence, receiving a 150-year sentence.

On September 5, 1972, 24-year-old English architect Judith Bettelley was found murdered and raped in the park. Not long after, Harrison was arrested for assaulting a woman named Cozetta Gladys with a concrete brick on a street in Chicago, but was released after paying his $5,000 bail. In July 1973, Irene Koutros was raped and stabbed to death, followed by 24-year-old Lee Alexis Wilson, an art student from California studying at the Art Institute of Chicago, who was killed under similar circumstances on August 3.

=== Final murder and capture ===
Ten days later, on the afternoon of August 13, a drunken Harrison left for Grant Park after seeing a pornographic film. He eventually chanced upon and attacked 28-year-old Judith Elaine Ott, who was visiting the city from Seattle, Washington, at a public restroom in Grant Park, during which he attempted to rape her. Ott resisted him violently and started screaming, causing Harrison to stab her several times, resulting in her death. The woman's husband, David, who was near the bathroom with their child, heard her screams and rushed to her aid, spotting Harrison with a knife in his hand. He attempted to escape, but David and a couple of park employees managed to apprehend him.

Once he was transported to the police station and placed under questioning, Harrison suddenly confessed to the murders of Ott, Lehmann, Wilson, and Bettelley, recounting details known only to the investigators at the time. For example, the perpetrator used a knife to remove a piece of one victim's flesh and had apparently taken it with him, with Harrison claiming that he had brought it to his house and then eaten it. During a search of his apartment, police found personal belongings and body hair from the murdered women, which had been stuffed into envelopes along with newspaper clippings about the crimes. Due to their similarity with the other crimes and the fact they lived next door to Harrison, authorities attempted to incriminate him in the killings of Koutros and a woman named Elizabeth Dawson, both of whom had been killed in August 1972, but he flatly denied any involvement in these cases.

Following his confession about the Lehmann murder, McDonald was released from prison and his case was labeled a miscarriage of justice. He was thus fully acquitted and formally apologized to by Governor Dan Walker. After his release, McDonald filed a civil lawsuit against the state, seeking $5,000,000 in damages for the years he had spent in prison as a result of his wrongful conviction, but the court ordered that only $15,000 be paid, as it was the maximum available amount in Illinois law at the time.

== Aftermath ==
Harrison was declared incapable of standing trial in 1978, acquitted by reason of insanity and sent for psychiatric treatment at the Menard State Penitentiary's psychiatric ward. In January 1986, due to complications from an old spinal injury, Harrison was diagnosed with damage to the spinal cord which rendered him almost completely paralyzed. Due to this, his state-appointed attorneys, Thomas Reynolds and W. Jameson Kuntz, petitioned for his release in May of that year, arguing that he no longer posed a threat to society in this state. In said petition, they also claimed officials from the Illinois Department of Corrections supported the motion, as his medical care cost them more than $184,000 a year.

However, the Cook County State's Attorney's Office insisted that Harrison could still be a threat, providing a series of testimonies showing that he still preserved movements in his hands and fingers. In addition, hospital staff testified that, despite his advanced age and health issues, Harrison continued to exhibit a high sex drive and often had erections while interacting with the nurses.

Ultimately, the court ordered that Harrison must undergo an independent forensic neurological examination to determine his physical condition and whether he was still dangerous. Harrison's sister and nephew then sent an anonymous letter to a Cook County Criminal Court judge, requesting that he remain in detention due to his insanity and the severity of his crimes.

In August 1986, Harrison's attorneys' petition was withdrawn, as his spinal cord injury had been healed as a result of therapeutic measures, allowing him to walk on crutches. Eventually, his physical condition improved, and due to this, he was considered too dangerous to be released and confined to a psychiatric hospital. Since then, nothing concrete is known of his fate, despite the fact that his crimes have been covered and discussed in media articles and several books.

== See also ==
- List of incidents of cannibalism
- List of serial killers in the United States

== Bibliography ==
- Susan Hall (August 25, 2020). The World Encyclopedia of Serial Killers: Volume Two, E–L. WildBlue Press. ISBN 978-1-952225-20-8.
