= Andre Crawford =

Convicted American serial killer

- Inmate photo - IDOC
- Born: March 20, 1962; Chicago, Illinois, U.S.
- Died: March 18, 2017 (aged 54); Menard Correctional Center, Chester, Illinois, U.S.
- Other name: Southside Strangler
- Height: 6 ft (1.8 m)
- Conviction: Murder (11 counts)
- Penalty: Life imprisonment without the possibility of parole

Details
- Victims: 11
- Span of crimes: 1993–1999
- Country: United States
- State: Illinois
- Date apprehended: January 28, 2000
- Imprisoned at: Menard Correctional Center, Randolph County, Illinois

Andre Crawford (March 20, 1962 – March 18, 2017) was an American serial killer, rapist and necrophile who killed 11 women between 1993 and 1999 in Chicago. Many of the women were addicted to drugs or worked as sex workers. He also had sex with their corpses. In 2009, Crawford was found guilty on all counts and sentenced to life imprisonment without parole.

All of the crimes were committed in the Englewood neighborhood, where, at the time, at least one other serial killer, Hubert Geralds, was active. Geralds would later falsely confess to a murder actually committed by Crawford.

== Early life ==
Crawford was born in Chicago in 1962. His father left the family shortly after his birth. His mother paid little attention to him, leading to her being prosecuted in the late 1960s for inappropriate parenting, and both Crawford and his sister being placed in a foster family with four other children. According to Crawford, he was subjected to beatings by his foster parents and was sexually abused by other members of the family. He also claimed that, as a teenager, he ran away from home and sought out his biological mother's relatives, who later went on to sexually abuse him and forced him to prostitute himself. However, this hasn't been proven, and his sister, adoptive parents and other relatives denied the claims. Crawford's adoptive father said that his son became addicted to drugs in the mid-1970s. As a result, Crawford dropped out of school at the age of 17 due to his addiction.

In the early 1980s, Crawford enlisted in the Army and later the Navy, but continued to use drugs during his further military service. Due to this, he couldn't perform his duties adequately, was constantly disciplined and eventually dishonorably discharged. After this, he returned to Chicago, where over the next few years he lived in squalor, using drugs and drinking heavily. During this period, Crawford changed several professions, mainly requiring low-skilled labor, and because of problems with housing, he lived in abandoned houses, homeless shelters and stayed over at friends' residences. When he had free time, Crawford stayed in the red-light district, in the company of prostitutes and pimps. While most of his acquaintances spoke only positively of him, between March 1993 and November 1999, Crawford was repeatedly arrested and prosecuted on charges of theft and drug possession. In 1999, he was found guilty, but received a suspended sentence with probation, during which a blood sample was taken. During this time, it became clear that he was aggressive towards women. On May 3, 1995, he was arrested yet again for assault and rape, spending over a year in the Cook County Jail awaiting the end of the investigation, but ultimately, the charges were dropped and he was released, as the victim refused to cooperate with the investigators and her testimony was questioned due to her drug addiction.

== Murders ==
As victims, Crawford chose Black girls and women who engaged in prostitution or were drug addicts, most of them being casual acquaintances whom he lured to abandoned houses or wastelands, ostensibly to share crack cocaine or have sex in exchange for money. He either strangled them or stabbed them to death with a knife. After committing the murders, Crawford left the corpses at the crime scenes, returning later in the day to perform sexual acts on them. All of the killings occurred in Chicago's Englewood neighborhood, which is known for its high rates of violent crime. His victims were Evandrey Harris, Patricia Dunn, Rhonda King, Angel Shatteen, Shaquanta Langley, Sonja Brandon, Nicole Townsend, Cheryl Cross, Tommie Dennis, Sheryl Johnson and Constance Bailey. He attacked a 12th woman and left her for dead on Thanksgiving 1997, but she survived.

== Exposure ==
Crawford was arrested on January 28, 2000, following a DNA test, establishing his involvement in seven murders. After his arrest, during the initial interrogations, Andre admitted his guilt and told the investigators that he was responsible for an additional three killings, as well as several other attacks, the victims of whom survived. This was confirmed by the surviving victims, who identified him as their assailant. Crawford expressed no remorse and stated that he wouldn't stop killing, noting that it had become like an addiction to him.

After his capture, it was revealed that Crawford was involved in a police operation to capture the elusive serial killer, participating in surveillance activities around the area and even helping police distribute leaflets with composites of the suspect and about what precautions should be taken to avoid becoming a victim of violent crimes.

Crawford was charged with 11 counts of murder and sexual offenses with aggravating circumstances, including one count of attempted murder.

During his confessions, Crawford admitted to killing Rhonda King, but another serial killer, Hubert Geralds, had already been convicted of that crime. In response, the Cook County Prosecutor's Office announced that they would overturn Geralds' conviction, as his testimony was considered questionable from the start. Subsequently, Geralds was exonerated of the King murder, but remained incarcerated, as the DNA test established his guilt in the other five murders he was convicted of.

== Trial, imprisonment and death ==
Due to various circumstances, including numerous judicial errors in both detainees' convictions, the introduction of a moratorium on the death penalty in the state and numerous court motions from both defense and prosecution, Crawford's trial was delayed until mid-November 2009. Because of this, he spent a total of nine years and ten months detained at the Cook County Jail, more than any other inmate in the history of Illinois.

On December 10, 2009, by jury verdict, he was found guilty on all counts and given a life imprisonment sentence without the chance of parole. Crawford was imprisoned in Illinois at the Menard Correctional Center. He died on March 18, 2017, two days before his 55th birthday, of liver cancer.

== See also ==
- Hubert Geralds
- List of serial killers in the United States
- List of serial killers by number of victims
- List of homicides in Illinois
