= Richard Honeck =

American murderer (1879–1976)

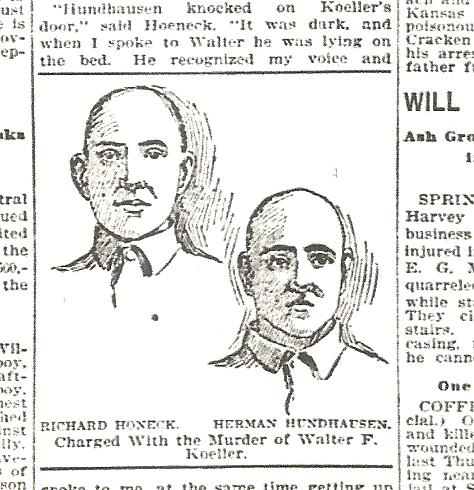
- Sept 5, 1899 Drawing of Richard Honeck and Herman Hundhausen
- Born: Richard Honeck; January 5, 1879
- Died: December 28, 1976 (aged 97); Roseburg, Oregon, US
- Occupation: Telegraph operator
- Known for: one of the longest prison custodial sentences in criminal history in the United States (time served 64 year and 1 month)
- Status: Deceased
- Conviction: Murder
- Penalty: Life Imprisonment

Details
- Country: United States
- State: Illinois
- Locations: Joliet Correctional Centre; Southern Illinois Penitentiary

Richard Honeck (January 5, 1879 – December 28, 1976) was an American murderer who served one of the longest custodial sentences ever to terminate in a prisoner's release in American criminal history. Jailed in November 1899 for the murder of a former school friend, Honeck was paroled from Southern Illinois Penitentiary in Chester, Illinois on 20 December 1963, having completed 64 years and one month of his life sentence, and served a total of 23,418 days in jail.

== Koeller murder ==
Honeck, a telegraph operator and son of a wealthy dealer in farm equipment, was 20 years old when he was arrested in Chicago in September 1899 for the murder of Walter F. Koeller. He and another man, Herman Hundhausen, had gone to Koeller's room armed with an eight-inch Bowie knife, a sixteen-inch Bowie knife, a silver-plated case knife, a .44 caliber revolver, a .38 caliber revolver, a .22 caliber revolver, a club, and two belts of cartridges. They also carried a getaway kit consisting of two satchels filled with dime novels, obscene etchings, and clothes from which the names had been cut.

Koeller, who was later found by the police sitting in a chair stabbed in the back, had testified for the prosecution some years earlier when Honeck and Hundhausen were charged with setting a number of fires in their home town of Hermann, Missouri.

According to a confession made by Hundhausen, the two men had sworn revenge and planned Koeller's murder in considerable detail. Honeck, Hundhausen said, had stabbed the dead man with the eight-inch bowie knife, which was discovered "smeared with coagulated blood".

== Prison ==
Honeck spent the first years of his sentence in Joliet Prison, where in 1912 he stabbed the assistant warden with a hand-crafted knife. He served 20 days in solitary confinement for that infraction, and was shackled with a ball and chain for six months, but had a clean record after moving to Southern Illinois Penitentiary, where he worked for 35 years in the prison bakery.

In the decades between his conviction and the time his case came to public notice again in August 1963, Honeck received one letter—a four-line note from his brother in 1904—and two visitors: a friend in 1904, and a newspaper reporter in 1963.

== Media attention ==
Associated Press reporter Bob Poos brought attention to Honeck's case in 1963 after seeing reference to it in the Menard prison newspaper. In a follow-up report, Poos noted that the aged murderer had subsequently received a mailbag of 2,000 letters, including a proposal of marriage from a woman in Germany, offers of employment, and gifts of money in sums ranging from $5 down to 25 cents. Honeck, who was permitted under prison rules to answer one letter per week, observed: "It'll take a long time to deal with these."

"I guess I'd have to be pretty careful if I got paroled," the 84-year-old prisoner concluded when interviewed by Poos. "There must be an awful lot of traffic now, and people, compared with what I remember."

== Later life and death ==
Honeck was released on 20 December 1963 upon the intervention of his niece, Clara Orth, and the two eventually settled in Sutherlin, Oregon. In 1971, he was admitted to a Roseburg nursing home, where he spent the last five years of his life. He died in December 1976 at the age of 97.

== Honeck's time served compared ==
The time served by Richard Honeck has been exceeded since his release in at least three cases.

Johnson Van Dyke Grigsby (1886–1987) served 66 years and 123 days at Indiana State Prison from 1908 to 1974 after stabbing a man in 1907 during a poker game/bar fight.

Joseph Ligon (1938–present) served 68 years at the State Correctional Institution – Phoenix and was at one time the oldest juvenile lifer in the US, Ligon at age 15 was sentenced in 1953 to life without parole for murder, a mandatory sentence at the time. Ligon first rejected a resentencing and parole offer in 2016. Ligon was again resentenced in 2017 and immediately eligible for parole but refused it, pending his appeal. Ligon contends that he should be resentenced to "time served" and released, so he can cut all ties to the justice system. He was released in 2021, after serving 68 years in prison.

Paul Geidel, (1894–1987) who was convicted of second-degree murder in 1911, served 68 years and 245 days in various New York state prisons. He was released on May 7, 1980, at the age of 86. Geidel's case differed from Honeck's in several key respects. First, he was initially sentenced not to life imprisonment but to twenty years to life, but was later declared insane and was incarcerated in a psychiatric hospital. Secondly, Geidel was offered parole at an earlier date than was Honeck – in 1974, when he had served only 63 years. By this time, Geidel had become institutionalized and declined release, voluntarily choosing to remain confined for an additional six years.

William Heirens, (1928–2012) the "Lipstick Killer," confessed and pleaded guilty to three murders in Chicago in 1946, sentenced to three life terms, and imprisoned 5 September 1946. He exceeded Honeck's record of time served in August 2010. Heirens died still incarcerated on March 5, 2012.

== See also ==
- List of longest prison sentences served
