= Kevin Taylor =

Kevin Taylor may refer to:

- Kevin Taylor (Australian footballer) (born 1958), Australian rules footballer
- Kevin Taylor (boxer) (born 1963), British Olympic boxer
- Kevin Taylor (soccer) (born 1983), American soccer player
- Kevin Taylor (English footballer) (born 1961), English footballer
- Kevin Taylor (rugby league) (1946–2020), English rugby league footballer who played in the 1960s, 1970s and 1980s
- Kevin Taylor (serial killer) (born 1974), American serial killer
- Kevin Taylor (engineer), British Formula One engineer
