= Stuart Heaton case =

1991 murder case

Mug shot of Stuart Heaton

The Stuart Heaton case was a controversial murder investigation that resulted in the conviction of a man named Stuart Heaton for the 1991 murder of a sixteen-year-old, Krystal Naab, in Ramsey, Illinois. Heaton was sentenced to life imprisonment without the possibility of parole. The case against him was largely circumstantial, except for a semen sample found on the victim. DNA profiling that was conducted and presented at the trial as evidence against Heaton was disputed by some scientists. In 2001 another DNA test was performed, which proved with 31 billion to 1 accuracy that Heaton was the killer.

== Murder ==
On the afternoon of July 23, 1991, sixteen-year-old Krystal Naab was found murdered in her parents' mobile home in Ramsey, Illinois; she had been stabbed 81 times with a pair of sewing scissors. An autopsy revealed that Naab was three months pregnant. Questioning of the victim's brother led police to a 25-year-old carpenter named Stuart Wayne Heaton. He was subsequently arrested and observed to have cuts on his hands. In addition, witnesses claimed to have seen a white pickup truck (the same type of vehicle Heaton owned) at the Naab residence on the day Krystal was murdered. He was indicted on two counts of first-degree murder by a grand jury.

Menard Correctional Center in Chester, Illinois, where Heaton is serving his life sentence

== Conviction ==
Heaton was put on trial in 1992. DNA testing of the semen sample taken from Naab's body, conducted by Dr. Robert Allen, was compared to the DNA of Heaton, concluding that it was a match, and that the chances of the DNA matching a white male other than Heaton were 1 in 52,600. There was no other physical evidence at the crime scene that could be linked to Heaton. The DNA evidence, along with circumstantial evidence, ultimately convicted Heaton of Krystal Naab's murder and he was sentenced to life in prison without the possibility of parole.

However, the DNA testing was disputed by some, including the defense expert at Heaton's trial, Dr. Gary Litman, who said it was the "worst quality DNA work I've seen done." Analysis of the DNA evidence by Dr. Dan E. Krane was inconclusive on whether the semen belonged to Heaton, and that the case could be made that someone else committed the murder. Another expert in the field, Dr. Thomas Marr, also criticized the work of Allen due to mistakes made during the DNA testing. In 1997, Heaton's request to have his conviction overturned was denied.

In July 2001, Heaton was granted a new round of DNA testing by a Fayette County judge. In 2001, new DNA testing was performed unequivocally proving that Heaton was, in fact, the murderer. However, there are still some who support him and maintain his innocence.

== In the media ==
Heaton's case was featured on several television programs, including Unsolved Mysteries and The Investigators.

== See also ==
- List of homicides in Illinois
