= Robert Ben Rhoades =

American serial killer and rapist (born 1945)

- Rhoades' mugshot
- Born: November 22, 1945 (age 80); Council Bluffs, Iowa, U.S.
- Other name: The Truck Stop Killer
- Convictions: Illinois; First degree murder (Note: One count of first-degree murder in Illinois and one count of capital murder of multiple persons in Texas.); Texas; Capital murder (2 counts)
- Penalty: Life imprisonment without parole

Details
- Victims: 4–50+
- Span of crimes: 1975–1990
- Country: United States
- States: Texas; Illinois
- Date apprehended: April 1, 1990
- Imprisoned at: Menard Correctional Center

Robert Ben Rhoades (born November 22, 1945), also known as the Truck Stop Killer, is an American serial killer and rapist. He is confirmed to have tortured and killed at least two couples in Illinois and Texas in 1989 and 1990, and is additionally suspected of torturing, raping, and killing more than fifty women between 1975 and 1990, based on data about his truck routes and women who went missing during those years and who met the profile of his preferred victims. He was also arrested two times for different reasons before even being an adult. At the time he was caught, Rhoades claimed to have engaged in these activities for fifteen years.

== Early life ==
Rhoades was raised by his mother in his formative years, as his father was a soldier in the United States Army and was stationed in West Germany. Rhoades was attending elementary school when his father returned from duty overseas. After his father was discharged from the military, he found work as a firefighter. Rhoades was active in his schools' extracurricular activities and involved himself with various sports and other programs, including football, wrestling, choir, and French club. Rhoades's criminal involvement during his high school years consisted of an arrest in 1961 at age 16 for tampering with a vehicle, and an arrest for public fighting in 1962 at age 17.

After graduating from Thomas Jefferson High School in Council Bluffs in 1964, he joined the Marine Corps. During the same year, his father was arrested for molesting a 12-year-old girl, and subsequently committed suicide while awaiting trial. Rhoades was dishonorably discharged from the military for his involvement in a robbery. After his dishonorable discharge from the Marines, he attended college but dropped out. He later attempted to join a law enforcement agency, but was rejected for his dishonorable discharge from the Marine Corps. Rhoades married three times, having a son with his first wife. Subsequently, he found work in stores, supermarkets, warehouses, and restaurants. Eventually, he became a long-haul trucker. During the 1980s, Rhoades developed interests, including involving himself in the BDSM scene. It was during this time that he allegedly verbally, physically, and sexually abused his third wife, Deborah Rhoades.

== Crimes ==
- On October 26, 1990, deer hunters discovered skeletal remains in Millard County, Utah. At the time, the victim could not be identified, and she was known under the name "Jane Doe 1" for the next thirteen years. It was not until May 2003 that forensic scientists from the University of Arizona, after comparing X-rays of the victim's jaw, were able to identify her as 24-year-old Patricia Candace Walsh. Walsh and her 26-year-old husband Douglas Scott Zyskowski, both from Seattle, Washington, went missing shortly after leaving the city in 1989. Zyskowski's remains were discovered in January 1990 in Ozona, Texas, near Interstate 10, and he was identified in 1992. After Walsh was identified, representatives from the Utah State Police Department contacted their colleagues from the Texas Ranger Division, but the investigation did not identify their killer. After his arrest, Rhoades confessed to their murders. He claimed that the couple were hitchhiking when Rhoades picked them up in his truck while on a long-haul journey. He immediately killed Zyskowski and dumped his body in Sutton County, Texas, where it was later found. He kept Walsh for over a week. During this time, he tortured and raped her numerous times before killing her and dumping her body in Millard County, Utah.
- Less than a month after Walsh's death, he abducted an 18-year-old victim, Shana Holts, who escaped and informed police. When Rhoades was detained, the victim declined to press charges, feeling that she would not be believed despite extensive evidence. In her statement to police, she said, "I don't see any good in filing charges. It's just going to be my word against his. If there was any evidence, I would file. I would file charges and sue him." It was later asserted that she was fearful of Rhoades after enduring two weeks in his truck. Rhoades had converted the sleeper cab of his truck into his own personal torture chamber where he kept women, sometimes for weeks, torturing and raping them.
- Regina Kay Walters, 14, was found nude and badly decomposed on September 29, 1990, in the loft of an abandoned barn near Greenville, Illinois. A farmer made the discovery. She had been missing since February 3, 1990 when she ran away from her home in Pasadena, Texas, with her boyfriend, 18-year-old Ricky Lee Jones. An autopsy revealed she had been strangled to death sometime in early March. A photograph of Walters being tortured was found in the home of Rhoades. On May 26, 1990, the partial skeleton of Jones was found near Harleton, Texas. He had been shot in the head.
- In the early morning of April 1, 1990, Trooper Mike Miller of the Arizona Highway Patrol found a truck with its hazard lights on at the side of Interstate 10 near Casa Grande, Arizona. When he investigated inside the cab, he discovered a nude woman, handcuffed and screaming. There was also a male present who identified himself as the driver of the truck. After failing to talk his way out of the situation, Rhoades turned over a gun that had been on his person. He was arrested and charged with aggravated assault, sexual assault, and unlawful imprisonment. He was left handcuffed in Miller's patrol car, but he nearly escaped. After further investigation, the arresting detective, Rick Barnhart, was able to make a connection to the Houston case and noticed a pattern stretching over the course of at least five months. In executing a search warrant for Rhoades's home, police found photos of a nude teenager who was later identified as Walters, whose body had been found in September 1990. Also present were photos of Walsh, whose body was discovered that October.

== Conviction ==
In 1994, Rhoades was convicted of the first degree murder of Regina Kay Walters and sentenced to life imprisonment without parole at Menard Correctional Center in Chester, Illinois. He was extradited to Utah in 2005 to be tried for the deaths of Candace Walsh and Douglas Zyskowski; however, in accordance with the victims' families' requests, the charges were dropped in 2006 so that they would not be required to testify more than once (for both states), and he was returned to prison. Rhoades was later extradited to Texas for the murder of Walters and Jones, where Rhoades, in exchange for avoiding a death sentence, pleaded guilty to their deaths and received a second life sentence. Rhoades continues serving his sentence of life without parole at the maximum-security Menard Correctional Center in Chester, Illinois.

== Books and films ==
=== Books ===
- Busch, Alva (1995). Roadside Prey. Pinnacle. ISBN 978-0786002214.
- Hazelwood, Robert Roy; Michaud, Stephen (1998). The Evil That Men Do. St. Martins Paperbacks. ISBN 0-312-97060-9. LCCN 98-45537.

=== Films ===
- Midnight in the Switchgrass

=== Television ===
- The FBI Files “Driven to Kill”
- Most Evil Killers
- Evil Lives Here

== See also ==
- List of serial killers by number of victims
- List of serial killers in the United States
- List of homicides in Illinois
