= Lorenzo Fayne =

American serial killer, rapist and necrophile

- Fayne's IDOC photo (2024/2025)
- Born: April 2, 1971 (age 55); Milwaukee, Wisconsin, U.S.
- Status: Incarcerated
- Conviction: First degree murder (5 counts)
- Penalty: Death; commuted to life imprisonment without parole

Details
- Victims: 6
- Span of crimes: 1989–1993
- Country: United States
- States: Wisconsin, Illinois
- Date apprehended: July 24, 1993
- Imprisoned at: Menard Correctional Center, Chester, Illinois

Lorenzo Fayne (born April 2, 1971) is an American serial killer and rapist who, between 1989 and 1993, murdered one woman and five children in the states of Wisconsin and Illinois. In 2001, he was convicted and sentenced to death, but the following year, in response to numerous miscarriages of justice in other cases, the Governor of Illinois George Ryan imposed a moratorium on capital punishment, commuting all prisoners' sentences to life imprisonment.

== Biography ==
Lorenzo Fayne was born on April 2, 1971, in Milwaukee, Wisconsin, in a family of several other brothers and sisters. Fayne spent his childhood and adolescence in the northwestern part of the city, a region plagued by poverty and crime. He grew up in an unstable family, as both of his parents had scrapes with the law, suffered from alcohol and drug dependencies, and frequently subjected Lorenzo to beatings, from which he suffered psychological trauma. In 1978, at the age of only 7, he was sexually assaulted by a neighbor boy. In his teen years, he spent time on the streets, often skipping school and failing academically. Eventually, he dropped out of school altogether.

Between 1984 and 1989, he was arrested several times for robbery, burglary, assault and auto theft, spending several years in juvenile prisons, where he was also physically and sexually assaulted by fellow inmates. During his incarceration, an IQ test determined his IQ to be between 68 and 75 points, qualifying him as borderline intellectually disabled. In 1989, after he was released from prison, Lorenzo left Milwaukee and moved in with his grandmother, Nelly Willis, in East St. Louis, Illinois, where he lived for the next four years.

== Exposure ==
Fayne first came under suspicion as a suspect in the July 23, 1993, murder of 17-year-old Faith Davis, who lived next door from his grandmother's house. Davis had been attacked in her apartment, during which she was raped and stabbed to death. In order to erase the evidence, the killer set fire to the apartment, but was spotted by witnesses, who identified him as Lorenzo Fayne. Police soon arrived to interrogate him, and while examining his clothes and home, blood stains were located. Fayne was taken to the police station, where he would eventually confess to robbing Davis' apartment, but refused to admit any involvement in her murder. On August 4, while examining fingerprints found at the crime scene, it was determined that one matched those found on the body of 6-year-old Aree Hunt, a young boy who had been raped and strangled on July 14, 1989, not far from Fayne's grandmother's house.

After he was confronted with these findings, Lorenzo confessed to murdering both Hunt and Davis. According to his testimony, the motive for killing Aree was an inferiority complex, which drove him to commit these vicious crimes so he could feel better about himself. After his family learned about his confessions, his grandmother talked to him in late August, during which Fayne confessed to three additional killings. They were of 14-year-old Latondra Dean, raped and stabbed to death on March 20, 1992; 9-year-old Fallon Flood, raped and strangled on July 20, 1992, and 17-year-old Glenda Jones, who was raped and stabbed to death on June 25, 1993. All of the victims lived and were killed within a several hundred meter radius from the house in which Lorenzo and his grandmother lived. He was also suspected of killing another girl: 16-year-old Nicole Willis, who was raped and beaten to death a few hundred meters away from the East St. Louis High School on October 16, 1989, but Fayne denied having anything to do with her death.

== Trial ==
In early 1994, Lorenzo Fayne was put on trial for the murder of Aree Hunt and was found guilty by the juries. The prosecution demanded that the court impose a death sentence on the child killer while his lawyers insisted on leniency towards their client and that a life term be given instead, citing the childhood abuse Lorenzo had suffered, which eventually led to mental, emotional and behavioral problems. This was confirmed by his grandmother Nelly, who attended the court hearings and testified in defense of her grandson, describing him in an extremely positive manner. While he managed to remain calm for most of the trial, upon hearing his grandmother's testimony, Lorenzo lost his composure and burst into tears. In August, the jury voted 11–1 to impose a death sentence, but as the decision was not unanimous, he was instead sentenced to life in prison without parole.

After his conviction, Fayne was sent to serve his sentence at the Menard Correctional Center. He was soon put on trial for the murders of Dean, Flood, Jones, and Davis. Based on his confessions and other evidence, he was found guilty and sentenced to death in 2001. However, in January 2003, the Governor of Illinois, George Ryan, commuted the death sentences of 157 convicts, and he was among those listed.

In September 2009, on the basis of DNA profiling, Fayne was linked to the murder of 32-year-old Rita Scott, who was found beaten to death with a blunt object on September 15, 1989, in Milwaukee. He was interrogated for the murder on October 27, 2009, during which he confessed to killing Scott, and having sex with the corpse post-mortem. Fayne remained a suspect for the murder of Nicole Willis until he was eventually excluded via DNA testing. Another East St. Louis resident, 51-year-old Carlos Garrett, was charged with her murder in 2013. In 2014, Garrett was acquitted of murdering Willis. Fayne is serving his sentence at Menard Correctional Center.

== See also ==
- List of serial killers in the United States
