= Randolph County Courthouse (Illinois) =

Local government building in the United States

Coordinates: 37°54′14″N 89°49′41″W

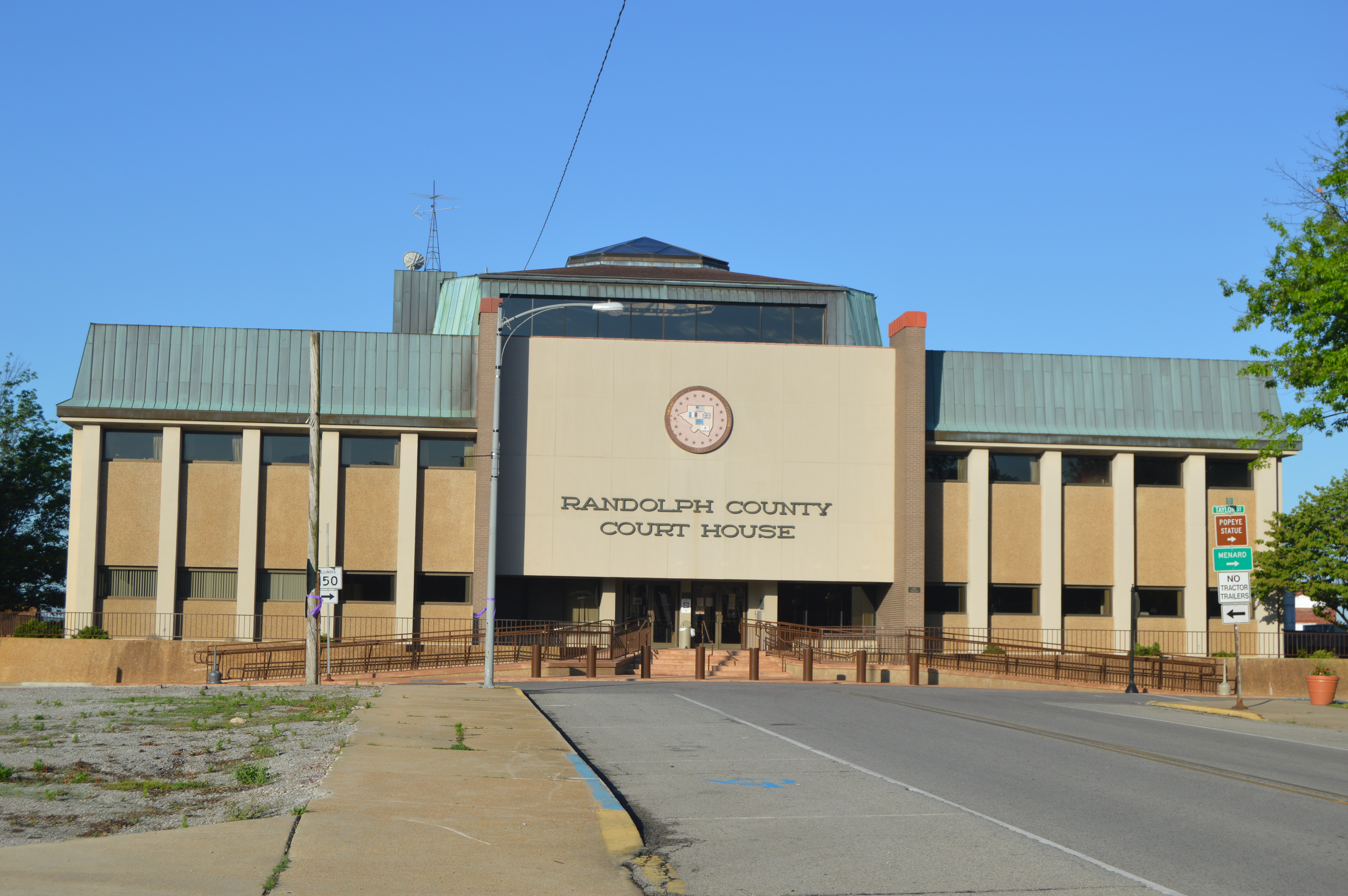
Taylor Street front of the courthouse

The Randolph County Courthouse is a government building in central Chester, the county seat of Randolph County, Illinois, United States. Built in 1972, it is the latest of several buildings to serve as the seat of government in Illinois's second oldest county, and the second erected in Chester after the relocation of county government from Kaskaskia in 1847 after a devastating flood.

== Early history ==
The first Frenchmen settled in present-day Randolph County c. 1685, and for the colony's first several decades, there was no formal local government: the missionary priests at Kaskaskia settled disputes and dispensed justice among both white men and Native Americans in the nascent French colony. Conflict with Spain prompted the construction of Fort de Chartres, which began in 1718, and for many years it was the seat of government in the area, even after Great Britain conquered the region in the Seven Years' War. However, the fort's location along the Mississippi River left it vulnerable to floods that carried away many walls and towers over the years, and the severity of the flood of 1772 prompted its abandonment and the removal of government to Kaskaskia.

Randolph County was organized in 1795 when Illinois was still part of the Northwest Territory, although an earlier courthouse, built for an early regional territorial court, predated the county by sixteen years. In the earliest years, three justices of the peace, acting collegiately, served the purposes of a county court; the first regular county court met in 1810 at the tavern of one Thomas Cox. No courthouse was built during the territorial period; Cox and other Kaskaskia tavern-keepers hosted the county government until 1812, in which year the county purchased a house in Kaskaskia. The first purpose-built courthouse was completed in 1821 after eighteen months of construction, and the former house sold to become a tavern; a two-story brick structure, the new courthouse cost $4,750.

== Moving to Chester ==
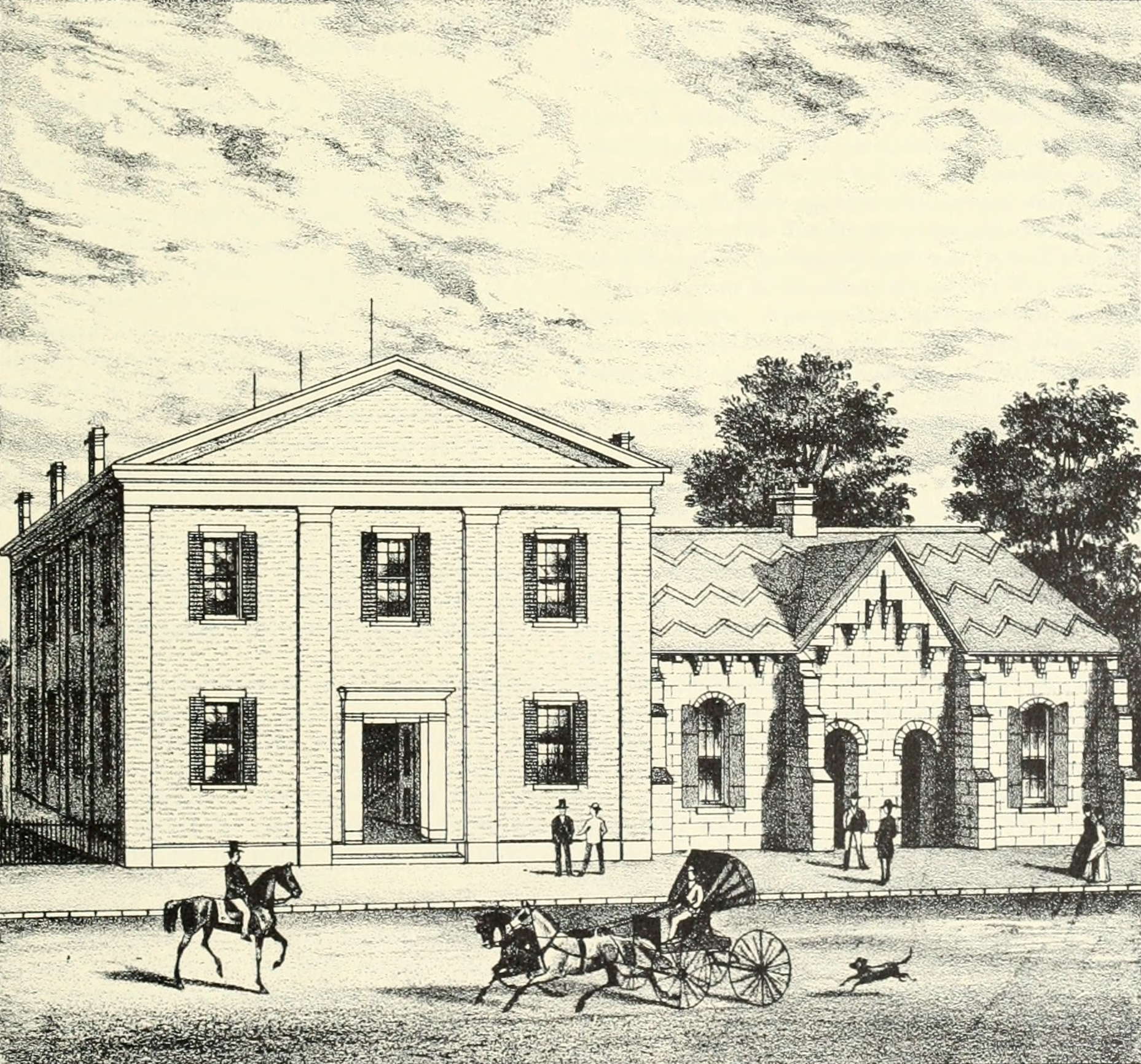
First courthouse in Chester

Disaster struck Kaskaskia in the form of the Great Flood of 1844; the highest waters in living memory forced the residents to flee to nearby bluffs, and the town itself was virtually destroyed. Even the avulsion of 1881, in which the Mississippi River cut off the bend in which Kaskaskia lies and left it attached to Missouri, was much less significant. The devastation of 1844 prompted calls for the removal of the county seat. In a fiercely contested election, featuring widespread electoral fraud and the involvement in the courts, resulted in the movement of the county seat to Chester in late 1847. Officials occupied the community's schoolhouse pending the construction of a new courthouse; built and equipped at private expense, the new building opened in 1850.

== Current courthouse ==
The 1850 courthouse lasted well over a century, but it was replaced with the current structure in 1972. A modernist structure with large areas of exterior concrete, its main entrance is situated in a recess at the center of the facade, atop a flight of steps. Above the entrance, a paneled wall features the words "Randolph County Court House" and the county seal. Because the building is set into a river bluff, an observation deck was constructed at the rear to overlook the river, and the interior is five stories tall. A grand spiral staircase, set above a fountain, connects the floors.
