= Chester Mental Health Center =

US maximum security forensic mental health facility

Coordinates: 37.9311°N 89.856886°W

The Chester Mental Health Center is the State of Illinois' only maximum security forensic mental health facility for those committed via a court order or deemed an escape risk. The facility is operated by the State of Illinois in Chester, Illinois, and is a part of the Illinois Department of Human Services, formerly the Illinois Department of Mental Health and Developmental Disabilities. It is adjacent to the Menard Correctional Center. The other secure mental health center in Illinois is Elgin Mental Health Center, which houses women as well as men. Chester Mental Health Center is a men's facility.

== History ==
The Board of Charities recommended a separate institution for the criminally insane as early as 1878. In 1879, the legislature authorized such a facility, but the appropriation was not used for this. In 1883, the governor again tried to fund a new institution, but there was disagreement over the site with both Springfield and Joliet as possibilities. In 1889, the legislature established the Asylum for Insane Criminals, and it received its first patients on November 2, 1891. W.T. Patterson transferred from the staff of Elgin State Hospital to become its first Superintendent. Control of the institution was placed with the Commissioners of the Southern Penitentiary at Menard. The original building on the penitentiary grounds was poorly constructed and was eventually torn down. A replacement was built on a separate campus near Chester, Illinois. When the Board of State Commissioners of Public Charities was abolished in 1909, the institute was reorganized and renamed Chester State Hospital effective January 1, 1910. In 1917, the Department of Public Welfare assumed responsibility for Chester State Hospital and retained control until the creation of the Department of Mental Health in 1961 (L. 1961, p. 2666). In 1975, the hospital changed its name to the Chester Mental Health Center.

== Today ==
The hospital is primarily used to care for forensic patients who have been found not guilty by reason of insanity, those persons found unfit to stand trial, and those who cannot be housed in a less secure setting. The patients (not convicts, as they have not been sentenced to a correctional facility) are required by Illinois law to remain confined in a mental hospital for a period of time.

== Attempted closing ==
In late 2011, Illinois Gov. Pat Quinn attempted to close down this facility, citing cost as the reason. However, it was decided that Chester Mental Health must remain open because there is no other maximum security mental facility to house people found unfit to stand trial or not guilty by reason of insanity in the state of Illinois.
