= Hubert Geralds =

American serial killer

Hubert Geralds Jr.
- Mugshot of Geralds
- Born: Hubert Geralds Jr. November 13, 1964 (age 61); United States
- Other name: The Englewood Strangler
- Convictions: First degree murder (5 counts); Attempted murder Residential burglary
- Penalty: Death; commuted to life imprisonment

Details
- Victims: 5
- Span of crimes: 1994–1995
- Country: United States
- State: Illinois
- Date apprehended: June 18, 1995
- Imprisoned at: Menard Correctional Center, Randolph County, Illinois

Hubert Geralds Jr. (born November 13, 1964) is an American serial killer who murdered five women between 1994 and 1995. He is serving his prison sentence, life without parole, in Menard Correctional Center, which is operated by the Illinois Department of Corrections. During his spree of murders, he was known as the Englewood Strangler. Geralds is in custody under the identification number B39967. He was admitted to the Menard Correctional Center on January 16, 1998.

== Life ==
Hubert Geralds Jr. was born on November 13, 1964. Little is known about Hubert Geralds' early life. It is known that his father, whom he is named after, abandoned him in early childhood and that Geralds suffered abuse from his mother's boyfriend.

He seems to have spent the years prior to his killing spree in New York. His occupation in New York is unknown as there is no record of employment. The only documented evidence of his presence was his incarceration record.

His movements between June 19, 1992, when he was paroled from a prison in New York, and November 21, 1992, when he was charged with residential burglary in Chicago, are uncertain. He served five years for his residential burglary charge.

== Murders ==
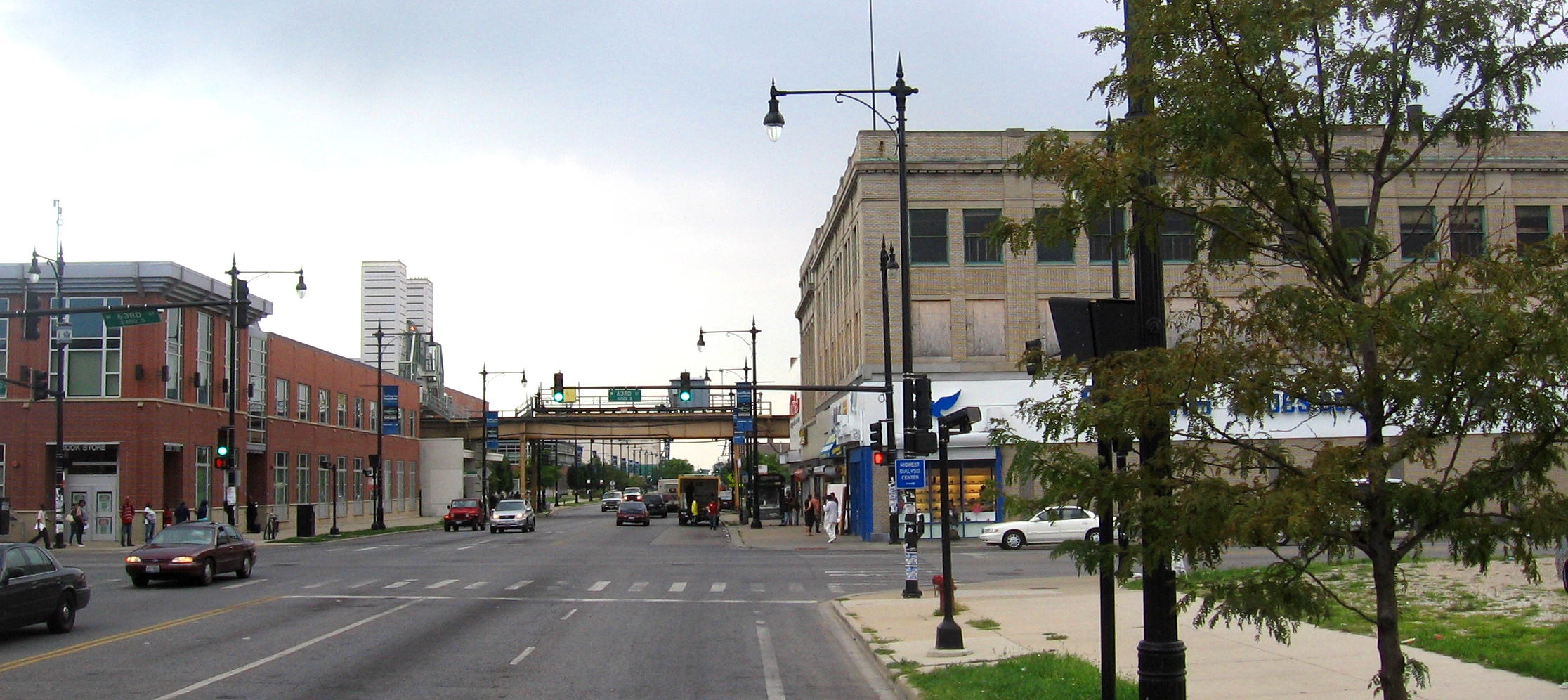
Englewood, Chicago

Geralds was responsible for the murders of five female sex workers from December 22, 1994, to June 17, 1995. He was also responsible for the attempted murder and the sexual assault of another female sex worker, who escaped after Geralds' attempted strangulation. All of his murders took place in the Englewood neighborhood of Chicago, which is particularly known for high crime rates and a known low socioeconomic area. Within Englewood, an area known as “The Stroll” on South Halsted Street was a popular location where Geralds began his murder process.

At the time of the murders, Geralds was 30 years old. He was addicted to drugs and also to prostitutes and their services. His modus operandi became seducing drug-addicted prostitutes with drugs, in particular crack cocaine, and then strangling his victims once he had them in privacy. He knew some of his victims from previous prostitution-related encounters. He used a technique known as the "Guardian Angel Chokehold" to strangle his victims.

At trial, the prosecution noted that Geralds was "someone who had the capacity to 'squeeze the last bit of life out of [his female victims]'". In all five of the murders he was charged with, the cause of death was asphyxia by strangulation. In the case where his victim got away and survived, he was charged with sexual assault of a minor with the intent to kill.

The names of his victims, the dates they were found deceased and their ages are as follows:

- Doretha Withers, December 22, 1994, aged 37
- Alonda Tart, March 14, 1995, aged 23
- Joyce Wilson, March 26, 1995, aged 28
- Millicent "Peanut" Jones, June 12, 1995, aged 25
- Mary Blackman, June 17, 1995, aged 42

== Arrest ==
On June 18, 1995, the day after the body of Mary Blackman was found, Geralds was arrested.

Mary Blackman's body was found in a waste disposal trash bin at the house that she shared with the Geralds' family on South May Street, Englewood, Chicago. Blackman was a good friend of Geralds' sister.

Hubert Geralds' sister, Angela Geralds, found the decomposing body of Blackman and contacted the police, giving them further information about how Geralds was a violent drug abuser and how she believed that he may have had something to do with the death.

The police arrested Geralds, noting that he had contacted the police in March about the death of a prostitute, Joyce Wilson. The detectives who investigated the murders were Sergeant Jack Ridges and Chief of Detectives Michael J Malone of the Chicago Police Department.

== Trial ==
Upon his arrest on June 18, 1995, Geralds was charged with the murder of six women and attempted murder of one female, including the murder of Rhonda King in December 1994 based on DNA linking them together. He confessed to all six murder whilst under investigation and on November 13, 1997, the day of his 33rd birthday, he was convicted by a jury as guilty on all charges laid against him.

Geralds’ defense attorney, Allen Sincox, presented an insanity defense, with the aim to have the court sentence his client to life in prison without parole instead of the death penalty. Sincox claimed that his client was intellectually disabled, had brain damage and suffered from a mental disorder known was “paraphilia” which caused his sexual addiction and his need to have sexual interaction with those unconscious. During the trial, this lack of mental capacity was highlighted by Geralds’ often being asleep in the court room and experts claimed his Intelligence Quotient was lower than 73, which classified him as mildly intellectually disabled.

Geralds' family spoke of his physical and mental troubles as a young child. Members of his family spoke of him suffering high levels of mental, physical and sexual abuse. Some argue that this was the cause of his mental health issues. His family also testified saying from a young age his mental health was suffering, often harming himself and attempting to harm himself, often not realizing what exactly he was doing, including thinking that he could jump out of windows and fly.

The prosecution, Assistant States Attorney Nick Ford and co-prosecutor Jeanne Bischoff discredited the mental health plea calling Hubert Geralds a "malingerer", claiming that he was putting on an act and portrayed him as a threat to society, a murderer and a drug user and dealer. The strength of the prosecution's argument and a testimony from Geralds’ only surviving victim Clenshaw Hopes held up the charges already laid against Hubert Geralds, rejecting the insanity plea.

After the three-week trial ended on January 9, 1998, Judge Michael P Toomin sentenced Geralds to death.

Geralds maintains his innocence, even though he confessed to the murders and was able to give details to the detectives about the killings and his involvement in the deaths. He has said that the deaths were purely disputes over drugs and financial situations resulting in arguments that led to physical confrontations.

=== Andre Crawford and trial controversy ===
On January 28, 2000, Andre Crawford was arrested for the murder of 11 females in Englewood, Chicago, the same neighborhood in which Geralds’ murders took place. During his investigation Crawford admitted to the rape and murder of Rhonda King. However, King was already among the murdered female prostitutes that Hubert Geralds had been sent to death row for in January 1998. Upon investigation and further evidence, including a taped confession and DNA that linked Crawford and King together, it was determined that Crawford had murdered King, not Geralds. Crawford confirmed this fact by revealing details of the murder that were not released to the public to the investigating detectives. On February 10, 2000, the prosecutors vacated the conviction against Hubert Geralds.

Geralds was tried again, this time for only five murders and one attempted murder. During the second trial the defense argued that Geralds was so mentally ill that he was coerced into admitting guilt for all the murders by Chicago Police and that the confessions were invalid. The Chicago police department denied a forced confession and said that regular procedure was followed in defense to the allegations.

Again the mental illness plea failed after the prosecution again claimed that Geralds was not as incapacitated as he seemed and urged the jury "not to be fooled", also presenting a letter that Geralds wrote to a newspaper from prison. The letter was articulated correctly, the majority of the grammar is correct and the handwriting is legible. Still, he remained on death row for the other five murders.

Finally, after controversy and exoneration, Geralds’ criminal incarceration records show 5 counts of class M Murder, Intent to Kill, Injure and 1 count of class X Attempt to Murder, Intent to Kill, Injure.

== Vacating of death sentence ==
In 2000, during his time as governor, Governor George Ryan declared a moratorium on Illinois state's capital punishment laws. As a result of this, Governor Ryan changed the sentences of 167 prisoners who were either already on death row or waiting to receive the death penalty to life in prison. On January 11, 2003, he was given life in prison without parole, and he remains in Menard Correctional Centre, Illinois.

== Cleshawn Hopes ==
Cleshawn Hopes was the intended sixth victim of Geralds' murder spree and was the victim of Geralds’ attempted murder charge. She testified at Geralds' trial.

On the night of April 14, 1995, Hopes and Geralds had been smoking crack cocaine and marijuana together at her apartment in the 5700 block of South Elizabeth Street, Englewood, Chicago. Hopes recounted that she and Geralds had left the apartment for more drugs and to acquire payment methods for the drugs. They had split up and were each alone when she was grabbed by the neck from behind. She told the court “I was being lifted off the ground and started to black out.”

She was attacked in an alley near Racine Avenue. When she woke up from the attack, she was being raped by Geralds in a van. She fought him off and dove through a piece of wood covering an opening and crawled her way out. Hopes recounts “running like hell” and made it back to her home, where she immediately contacted police.

Hopes identified Geralds as her attacker, but the defense argued against her identification and her validity as a witness, as she had told many different versions of the story of the night she was attacked. Hopes defended herself by arguing she told many different stories because she was protecting her image originally, not wanting her family to know she was a drug user and not wanting to face criminal charges herself.

== See also ==
- List of serial killers in the United States
