= Kenneth Allen (murderer) =

American convicted murderer

Kenneth Allen (born October 17, 1942) was convicted for the murders of Chicago police officers William Bosak and Roger van Schaik. He is currently serving life in prison without parole in Illinois.

== Earlier confrontations with police ==
On both December 10 and 13, 1978, Chicago police were contacted by Allen's common-law wife, Bianca Smith, who complained of having "problems" with Allen, and that he was heavily armed. Officers were both times dispatched to Allen and Smith's residence to deal with the domestic complaints. The second time, Allen was refusing Smith entry to their shared residence, and demonstrated his willingness to continue to do so by brandishing various firearms at police from his front doorstep and telling the officers "the next fucking pig that puts his foot on my property, I'm going to blow his head off" and "you motherfuckers are all going to pay for this."

Eventually, after a nineteen-hour standoff and in front of several Chicago TV crews, Allen surrendered to the police without a shot being fired.

While Allen was incarcerated pending bail for this incident, Judge Everette Braden issued a search warrant for Allen's home. It was executed later that day, while Allen was still in jail, whereupon officers retrieved the following firearms:

- one Colt .45 semiautomatic pistol
- one Smith & Wesson revolver, model 27
- one Smith & Wesson revolver, model 57
- one Colt .357 Python revolver
- one .44 Ruger Super Blackhawk revolver
- one Winslow 7mm rifle
- one Weatherby 12-gauge shotgun

Along with over a thousand rounds of various kinds of ammunition. Officers on the scene of the standoff claimed to have seen Allen at times bearing a gun that appeared to be an M16 rifle, however no such gun was recovered by the officers executing the search warrant.

Upon returning home from jail, Allen was furious that his guns had been confiscated. He contacted lawyer Kermit Coleman to sue for their return, but was informed it was unlikely he would ever get them back from the police.

== The murders ==
Three months later, Allen still seethed with resentment over the incident. Early in the afternoon of March 3, 1979, Allen visited a locksmith and glazier with a curious question. He wanted to know if the glass in Chicago police cruisers was bulletproof. The proprietor of the shop, Stanley Evans, told him that only Chicago riot wagons had bulletproof glass.

Two and a half hours later, Allen parked his brown Ford across the street from Chicago police officers William Bosak and Roger van Schaik as they were conducting a routine traffic stop. With the officer's back to him, Allen opened fire on Bosak with a .45 caliber semi-automatic pistol, emptying the magazine. Bosak was hit three times and was killed instantly.

Allen drew a second pistol and exited his car to engage Van Schaik—who was on the opposite side of the unmarked police cruiser from Allen—in a gun battle, the two men circling the officers' car. Both men exhausted their ammunition without scoring a hit. Allen then returned to his car and retrieved a .30 caliber carbine rifle, again opening fire on Van Schaik, wounding but not killing the officer. The rifle jammed after two or three shots. While Van Schaik lay wounded on the ground, Allen retrieved the .38 caliber service revolver from the corpse of Officer Bosak. He returned to the front of the car where the wounded Van Schaik lay, pleading for his life, and executed him with two shots to the face at point blank range.

Allen remained on the scene until two other officers arrived in response to the distress call. He initially fled in his car but quickly returned, attempting to shoot the officers as he drove past. Several more squad cars arrived in pursuit of Allen, still firing from the windows with the service revolver and a now unjammed carbine. After two collisions with police cruisers and one with a CTA bus, Allen was finally stopped when Officer Lawrence Rapien intentionally steered his cruiser head on into Allen's car.

Several guns were confiscated from Allen's car, along with about 250 rounds of ammunition, and a notebook containing the names, addresses, license plate numbers and phone numbers of several police officers and Everette Braden, the judge who had signed the search warrant authorizing Chicago Police to enter Allen's home.

== The trial and afterwards ==
Kenneth Allen represented himself at his trial and sentencing hearing. He pleaded guilty to the murders of Bosak and Van Schaik.

In court he stated he had killed the officers for committing "another violation of the people's rights by police" (i.e. the traffic stop), and because he recognized—mistakenly—Bosak from the standoff at his house on December 13. Neither officer had been present at that incident.

Because of this, and because of evidence—the large amount of ammunition, the notebook, the earlier questioning of the glazier—the jury agreed that he had premeditated the killings, Allen was sentenced to death.

Kenneth Allen remained under a sentence of death for many years before his sentence was commuted in 2003 in controversial circumstances by embattled Governor of Illinois George Ryan. As his last act in office, Ryan commuted (to "life") the sentences of all 167 convicts on or waiting to be sent to Illinois' Death Row.

As of 2009 Kenneth Allen remains in Menard Correctional Center.

== See also ==
- List of homicides in Illinois
- List of death row inmates in the United States
