= Kevin Taylor (serial killer) =

American serial killer

- IDOC mugshot
- Born: June 11, 1974 (age 52); Chicago, Illinois, U.S.
- Convictions: First degree murder (4 counts); Attempted murder Burglary; Unlawful possession of a weapon by a felon
- Penalty: Life imprisonment

Details
- Victims: 4
- Span of crimes: June 25 – August 18, 2001
- Country: United States
- State: Illinois
- Date apprehended: August 21, 2001
- Imprisoned at: Menard Correctional Center, Chester, Illinois

Kevin Taylor (born June 11, 1974) is an American serial killer who strangled four prostitutes to death following sexual encounters in Chicago, Illinois, between June and August 2001. After a would be fifth victim survived and identified him, Taylor was arrested and sentenced to multiple life terms in 2006.

== Early life ==
Taylor was born on June 11, 1974. Throughout his childhood, he was placed in numerous foster homes as both of his parents were convicts. Taylor lodged his first arrest in 1993 for burglary, for which he was sent to serve four years in prison. In 1999, he was convicted for the unlawful use of a weapon. In December 2000 he was granted work at a Cheesecake Factory on North Michigan Avenue, where he started working as a cook. By the summer of 2001, Taylor was living with his girlfriend and his two children in Edwardsville.

== Murders ==
Taylor, an avid frequenter of prostitutes, chose them as his murder victims. He would approach his would-be victims and make arrangements to meet up and have sex. He would then take them to secluded locations and would proceed to get into drug-induced arguments about the cost of sex, which resulted in him strangling them to death.

- Ola Mae Wallace (39): body discovered on June 25, 2001, inside an alleyway along North Sheridan Road.
- Diane Jordan (42): body discovered in an alleyway on July 10, 2001, in the 1400 block on North Mohawk Street.
- Cynthia Halk (38): body discovered inside a trash can in an alley on July 29, 2001, at 1150 N. LaSalle Street.
- Bernadine Blunt (39): body discovered on August 18, 2001, inside an abandoned building at 331 E. Kensington Ave.

Phyllis Robinson (38), was attacked and strangled on July 27, 2001. She was not sexually assaulted and is the only victim to have survived Taylor.

== Investigation and arrest ==
In early August, police in Chicago's north side issued an alert to local street women, warning them about the recent murders. By this time, they were investigating the deaths of up to 18 women involved with prostitution dating back to the 1990s. When police examined the body of Blunt, they discovered a timecard underneath her, which contained Taylor's name. Subsequently, police arrested him at his job on August 21. By this time, the four murders were suspected to be linked, and police sought to question the only surviving victim of the killer, who was Robinson.

In a police line-up, Robinson identified Taylor as the man who attacked her. Other evidence, including a fingerprint matching Taylor's that was found on the trashcan Halk was found in, led prosecutors to file three additional murder charges. The charges laid against him surprised just about everyone who knew Taylor. Larry Jones, a friend of Taylor's girlfriend, told the Chicago Tribune that "He just didn’t do all the things they say he did. I went to church today to pray for him. I hope he gets through this alright."

After some time however, Taylor confessed to police that he was responsible for all five crimes because he became enraged at the women during sex. With the help of local authorities, Taylor led them to the murder scenes, and reenacted the methods he used killing his victims.

== Trials and imprisonment ==
In January 2006, Taylor's trial for one of the murders, that of Cynthia Halk, was opened. During the trial, Taylor never took the stand, and his defense team did not try to convince the jury that he was innocent, as they had already been exposed to Taylor's videotaped confession. The jury found Taylor guilty of killing Halk, subsequently sentencing him to 50-years in prison. His trial for the three other murders was due to begin later that year, but he pleaded guilty to avoid a possible death sentence. On September 6, he was convicted of three more counts of first-degree murder, receiving a sentence of life imprisonment without parole. As of 2023, Taylor is incarcerated at Menard Correctional Center in Chester, Illinois, under the identification number B52807.

== See also ==
- List of serial killers in the United States
- List of homicides in Illinois
