= Menard Correctional Center =

Prison in Illinois, United States

- Interactive map of Menard Correctional Center
- Location: 1096 1350th Street Chester, Illinois; 37°54′43″N 89°50′31″W
- Status: Open
- Security class: Maximum
- Capacity: 3,861
- Opened: 1878
- Managed by: Illinois Department of Corrections

Menard Correctional Center, known prior to 1970 as Southern Illinois Penitentiary, is an Illinois state prison located in the town of Chester in Randolph County, Illinois. It houses maximum-security and high-medium-security adult males. The average daily population as of 2007 was 3,410.

Menard Correctional Center opened in March 1878; it is the second oldest operating prison in Illinois, and, by a large margin, the state's largest prison. Menard once housed death row; however, on January 10, 2003, the Condemned Unit closed when then governor George Ryan granted clemency to all Illinois death row inmates. It is a part of the Illinois Department of Corrections.

Menard Correctional Center's average prisoner age is 34 years old. Each inmate's average annual cost totals, as of fiscal year 2018, $27,364.

== Current facility ==
As of 2006, Menard Correctional Center has a total of 2,600 acres (1,100 ha), 41 acres (17 ha) of which are inside the grounds.

The grounds are composed of six housing units. The South Lowers Housing Unit and the South Uppers Housing Unit house inmates with moderate aggression levels and those who currently have job assignments (though they closed for repairs in October 2018). The North I Cell House contains the Step-Down Unit, and General Population. The North II Cell House contains inmates in disciplinary segregation, administrative detention, and the general population. The East Cell House is heavily monitored. Inmates assigned here are classified as either Level E, High, or Moderate escape risk. The West Cell House holds inmates that are either high or moderate escape risk and are classified as High Aggressive Inmates, as well as the Protective Custody Unit.

Within the grounds are also the Inmate Dining Hall, Chapel, Health Care Unit, Receiving and Classification Unit, Education Building, Maintenance and Telecommunications Departments, Menard Division of Illinois Correctional Industries, and Randolph Hall, which acts as Menard's training complex for prison employees.

Inmates who are illiterate attend school. Other inmates can enroll voluntarily. Menard had courses for elementary schooling and several high school subjects.

The current industries at Menard include meat processing, knitting and sewing, manufacturing of floor care and cleaning products, waste removal, and recycling operations.

Menard, as of 2006, employs approximately 854 prisoners. It has a daily population of around 3,416 inmates. The racial breakdown is 62% black, 28% white, and 9% Hispanic. Of the inmates housed at Menard, 51% are incarcerated for murder, 21% have life sentences, and 33% are serving more than 20 years. The average age of inmates at Menard is 34 years old.

== Capital punishment ==
By 1931, Menard was one of three sites in Illinois where executions were carried out by electrocution. Between 1928 and 1962, the electric chair was used 18 times here for those sentenced to death in the southern counties of the state. The state's other electrocutions were carried out at the Stateville Correctional Center in Crest Hill and at the Cook County Jail in Chicago.

Prior to the January 11, 2003, commutation of death row sentences, male death row inmates were housed in Menard, Pontiac, and Tamms correctional centers. After the commutations, only Pontiac continued to hold death row prisoners.

== History ==
=== 19th century ===
The first Illinois penitentiary was founded in Alton, the Alton Military Prison, in 1833. Reformer Dorothea Dix visited the site and was sharply critical of the filthy conditions there in an 1847 address to the Illinois General Assembly. She noted, among many other things, that Alton was the only prison in the U.S. where inmates were made to stand while eating meals. In 1858, the Alton prison was replaced by the Joliet Correctional Center and closed.

Twenty years later, the Southern Illinois Penitentiary opened, taking prisoners from the southern counties of the state. It was established in 1878, overlooking the Mississippi River. It accepted 200 prisoners the next year. The original buildings were finished by 1889, consisting of the North and South Cell Houses and the Administration Building. A wall enclosed the 11½ acres of the prison grounds. The rear wall runs over the top of a hill that was one of the prison's rock quarries.

Menard also had a quarry outside the walls. All the original buildings were constructed by prison labor. The original North and South Cell Houses each contained 400 cells on four tiers. Inmates lived two to a cell. None of these cells had plumbing. Buckets were used instead.

The exterior includes columns, an awning portraying skeleton keys and a scale of justice. The entranceway has two stone lions. Christie Thompson and Joe Shapiro of The Marshall Project wrote that the exterior "looks more like an ornate university building than a maximum-security facility.

=== 20th century ===
In 1928, the prison suffered from massive overcrowding. Designed to hold 800 men, the institution had approximately 2,000. Thus, an additional five cages were built on each side of the cell house corridors. These cages, which housed two men each, had a center wall of steel with the top and sides consisting of iron bars.

Old buildings within the prison yard were also being used as dormitories, housing prisoners until around 1930 when a new cell house was built to combat the excessive inmate population. The new cell house contained 500 cells, each housing two inmates. All of these cells had plumbing. In 1928, the bathhouse was located in the basement of one of the old buildings. It contained 76 showers. By 1931, the baths were relocated to the basement of the commissary, containing 84 concrete showers. Throughout this time, inmates were given time to bathe once a week during the winter and twice a week in the summer.

In 1927, of the 484 inmates who arrived at the prison, 406 were white, and 78 were black. By 1928, there were 1974 inmates and 96 guards, a ratio of roughly 1 to 20. By 1931, the inmate population had risen to 2,285 with four yard offices and 130 guards, or approximately one guard for every 17 inmates. Of the 2,285 inmates, 1,844 were white and 441 were black.

In 1928, Menard owned 1,100 acres (4.5 km^{2}) of farmland outside the grounds. The farm included a dairy and a piggery that contributed to the prison diet. The root cellar was one of the largest and most intricately designed of any institution at the time. All industries within the prison were housed in the old buildings that, by 1928, had been renovated to provide better working conditions. The major industries included clothing manufacturing, a quarry, and farming. The products were sold on the open market; however, no compensation was awarded to inmates. By 1931, the farm grew to 1,500 acres (6.1 km^{2}) and brick manufacturing and the machine shop were added to the prison's major industries.

== Merit, rules, and regulations ==
=== Indeterminate sentencing ===
In 1897, Illinois adopted indeterminate sentencing. By 1931, eighty percent of the inmates were serving indeterminate sentences.

=== Merit system ===
In 1903, a "grade system" was adopted for inmates. This lasted until 1920, when the "progressive Merit System" was adopted. Using this system, "good time" could be awarded to or taken from inmates based on their behavior. In addition, inmates were divided into grades, A, B, C, D, and E, based on behavior. The disciplinary staff, consisting of the warden and his deputies, decided on promotions and demotions in grade levels. For example, men in grades A and B were allowed to write two letters a week. Those in C could only write once a week. D and E inmates could only write with special permission.

=== Rules and regulations ===
Silence was mandatory in the mess hall and in marching lines. Smoking was permitted in the cells and dormitories. The prison commissary, around 1930, allowed inmates to buy tobacco, candy, toilet articles, canned goods, and fruit. No limit was set on the purchases.

=== Punishments ===
Around 1930, punishment involved a loss of privileges. For more serious offenses, the men are put in punishment cells, large cells located in a building to the rear of the deputies' offices. For some offenses, men were cuffed to the bars during working hours. By 1931, this practice was discontinued.

== Major incidents ==
=== 1952 riot ===
In late October 1952, Menard experienced a prison riot, while Illinois Governor Adlai Stevenson was campaigning for president as the Democratic Party nominee. Prison guards were taken hostage during the riot, which began on October 27. One of the demands of the 399 prisoners engaged in the riot was to speak to the governor, and Stevenson left the campaign trail to negotiate with the prisoners. He was given credit for ending the riot when he appeared at the prison on October 31, backed up by an overwhelming show of force, and delivered the prisoners an ultimatum.

There had been a previous uprising on September 22. A month later, prisoners took a prison lieutenant and six guards as hostages when a more serious riot broke out.

Stevenson, backed up by between 100 and 200 state troopers, stood inside the prison yard and delivered the ultimatum over the prison public address system. He said, "We are going into the cells with state police armed with guns and with whatever force necessary." while the state troopers fired shots into the cell blocks held by the prisoners before entering the parts of the prison under the control of the rioters. All seven guards were recovered unharmed.

=== Later incidents ===
In the 1970s, a significant increase in inmate population, not only at Menard but also around the country, may have been the cause of two incidents during that time. In May 1973, thirty-eight inmates took over the commissary and held a guard hostage for sixteen hours. In May 1974, sixty inmates held four guards hostage, this time demanding congregation rights in the prison yard and several changes in administrative procedures.

In March 1994, Menard was in the news when 24-year-old Michael Blucker took the state to court after contracting HIV while in the prison. Blucker stated that prison staff helped gang members rape him. Although the juries found the staff not to be liable, the case uncovered problems of sexual assault and gang activities within the prison.

There were two deaths of prisoners who were housed in solitary confinement with other prisoners inside their cells. Around 2004, 28-year-old Corey Fox, who was serving a life sentence for murder, killed 22-year-old Joshua Daczewitz, a person from a Chicago suburb who was convicted of arson and robbery. On November 29, 2014, David Sesson killed Bernard Simmons; the two were also placed in a solitary confinement cell together.

== Notable inmates ==
- Michael Alfonso, committed a triple homicide. Extradited from Mexico.
- Kenneth Allen sentenced to death (commuted to life) for the murders of Chicago police officers William Bosak and Roger van Schaik.
- Andre Crawford serial killer convicted of killing eleven women.
- James Degorski serving a life sentence without parole for the deaths of seven people in the 1993 Brown's Chicken massacre in Palatine, Illinois.
- Lorenzo Fayne, serial killer who murdered one woman and five children.
- John Wayne Gacy serial killer. Sentenced to death for the rape and murder of 33 boys and young men.
- Hubert Geralds, serial killer who murdered at least six women in Chicago's south side.
- Robin Gecht is serving 120 years for the mutilation and rape of an 18-year-old prostitute in the Chicago area during the early 1980s.
- Lester Harrison, serial killer who murdered at least four women at Grant Park in Chicago between 1970 and 1973. He was previously incarcerated at Menard, where he killed an inmate in 1951.
- Stuart Heaton was sentenced to life in prison for the 1991 murder of a teenage girl.
- David Hendricks sentenced to four consecutive life sentences for the 1983 murders of his wife and children. Released after a 1991 retrial showed his innocence.
- Richard Honeck paroled after serving 64 years of a life sentence for murder—reputedly the longest sentence ever served that ended in the prisoner's release.
- Milton Johnson a serial killer convicted of ten murders.
- Jack McCullough sentenced to life in prison in September 2012 for the December 3, 1957, murder of seven-year-old Maria Ridulph, 55 years after the murder, but this conviction was overturned on April 15, 2016, and he was subsequently released.
- Brodey Murbarger sentenced to 50 years in prison in January 2023 for the 2014 murder of Fairfield, Illinois teenager, Megan Nichols.
- Drew Peterson, former police sergeant, was sentenced to 38 years for the murder of his third wife, Kathleen Savio.
- Robert Ben Rhoades, former truck driver, serial killer and rapist. Suspected of killing and raping 100+ women while on the road in the 1980s and early 1990s.
- Kevin Taylor was a serial killer convicted of killing four women.
- Homer Van Meter bank robber and criminal associate of John Dillinger.
- Chester Weger sentenced to life after being convicted of murdering three women at Starved Rock State Park in Utica, Illinois. Granted parole in November 2019.
- Ahbir Sardin aka D.Rose (Chicago gang member of the notorious 600 gang shouted out in rap songs by several of Chicago's biggest rappers such as Chief Keef, Lil Durk and King Von) serving a 40 year sentence for a 2014 murder on the southside of Chicago.

== In popular culture ==
In the 1993 movie The Fugitive, Dr. Richard Kimble (played by Harrison Ford) is sent to the prison at Menard to await execution, but escapes following a bus-train collision en route.
