= Chester, Illinois =

- City
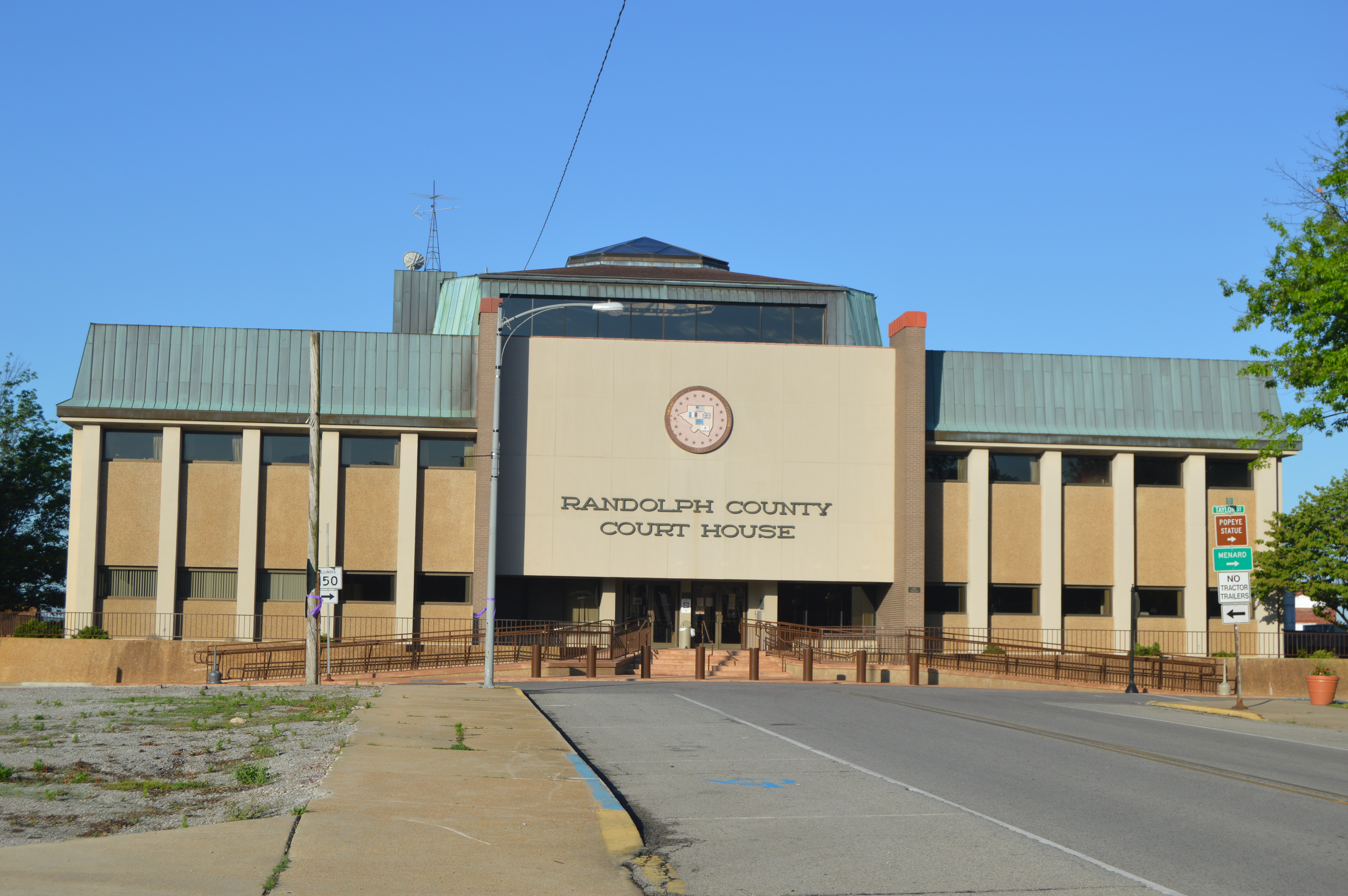
- Randolph County Courthouse
- Nickname: Home of Popeye
- Interactive map of Chester, Illinois
- Location within Illinois Location within the United States
- Coordinates: 37°55′11″N 89°49′33″W
- Country: United States
- State: Illinois
- County: Randolph

Area
  - Total: 5.82 sq mi (15.08 km^{2})
  - Land: 5.81 sq mi (15.04 km^{2})
  - Water: 0.015 sq mi (0.04 km^{2})
- Elevation: 627 ft (191 m)

Population (2020)
  - Total: 6,814
  - Density: 1,173.6/sq mi (453.14/km^{2})
- Time zone: UTC-6 (CST)
  - Summer (DST): UTC-5 (CDT)
- ZIP code: 62233
- Area code: 618
- FIPS code: 17-13139
- GNIS feature ID: 2393819
- Website: www.chesterill.com

Chester is a city in and the county seat of Randolph County, Illinois, United States, on a bluff above the Mississippi River. The population was 6,814 at the 2020 census. It lies 61 miles (98 km) south of St. Louis, Missouri.

== History ==
=== Founding ===
Samuel Smith is said to be the town's founder because he built the first home in Chester, established a ferry system, and began the construction of a mill in 1829. The town was named after Chester, England, the city from where his wife Jane Smith was from. The first business in Chester was a general store that opened in 1830 along with a castor oil press established by R. B. Servant, who furnished farmers with seed and growing methods to later buy the beans they produced for oil extraction. This was a flourishing business until the petroleum industry made it obsolete. The first wedding in the town of Chester was held on February 4, 1834. Content Walker, the bride and Amzi Andrews, the groom held their wedding in a 16 feet square log cabin.

=== Cole Milling Company ===
The H.C. Cole Milling Company was founded by Nathan Cole in 1839. It started out as a small sawmill with a corn-grinding attachment which encouraged the townspeople to plant grains, and in a short time the first Cole flour mill was built. The mill still exists in Chester but it is now operated by Ardent Mills. Nathan Cole also brought the first electric generator to Chester and used the surplus of power from the mill to operate street lights. This was a modern convenience that was not even available in Chicago at that point. The generator is now on display at the Ford Museum in Dearborn, Michigan.

=== International Shoe Company ===
In 1916, Messrs. Bronson, Albert Gilster, Frank Wolff and John Herschbach developed the site for the International Shoe Company in the center of town where the Gilster Mary Lee Corp. is today. In 1922, a second building was built, and the company had more than 1000 employees and was producing thousands of pairs of children's shoes. During World War Two, the factory operated primarily by women produced military/combat boots for the troops in service. In 1953, payroll reached over $2,000,000. The factory was closed by the company in the early 1960s after 45 years of operation.

=== Prim Hosiery Mill ===
In 1925, the Prim Hosiery Mill was a knitting mill that began operations under Joshua Richman with 50 employees. The mill grew to employ more than 275 people and produced over 300,000 pairs of stockings a month with annual payroll exceeding $700,000. The knitting mill continued operations through the 1960s. The building still stands as one of the Gilster Mary Lee Corp. factory buildings.

=== Chester Pool ===
Construction began for the Chester Pool in 1939 as part of a Works Progress Administration (WPA) public works program to create employment during the Great Depression. It was completed in 1941, although due to the delivery of the filtration system being delayed it did not officially open until May 30, 1942, under the management of William Weber. A total of 250 swimmers visited the swimming pool in the first week and were charged 15 cents for weekdays and 25 cents for weekends.

Due to leaks and other deterioration issues, as well as high repair costs, the pool has been closed since 2014.

=== Home of "Popeye" ===
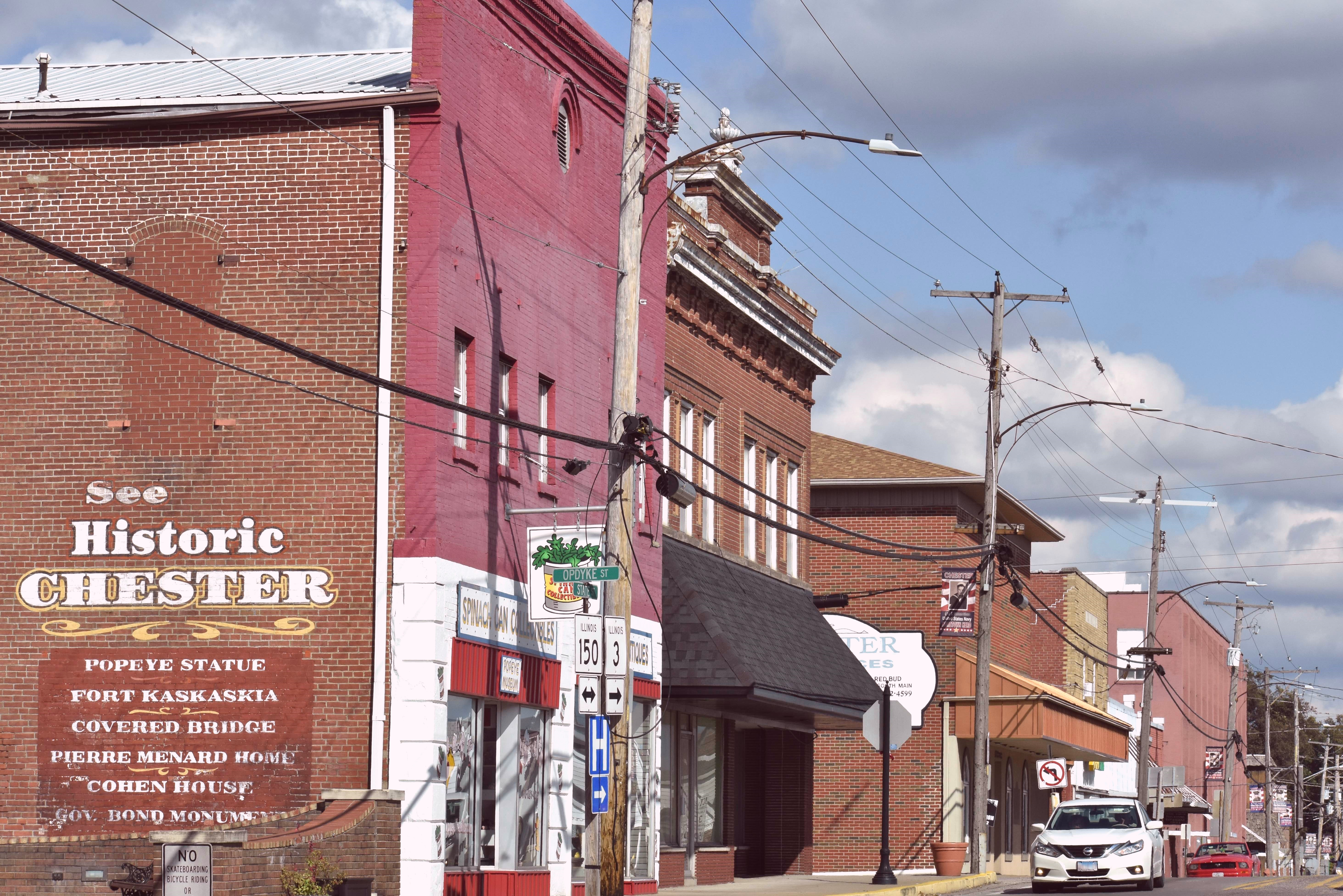
Row of buildings on State Street in Chester, the closest building being the Popeye Museum.

Chester is the "Home of Popeye," where a 6-foot (1.8 m), 900-pound (410 kg) bronze statue of Popeye the Sailor Man stands in the Elzie C. Segar Memorial Park, which honors Popeye's creator, Elzie Segar. The park is located next to the Chester Bridge. Several of Segar's characters were created from his experiences with people of Chester.

New statues honoring the other Thimble Theater characters are added each year.

=== Popeye's Picnic and Parade ===
Popeye's Picnic is an event held in Chester the Friday, Saturday and Sunday following Labor Day in the month of September. Popeye's Picnic consists of rides, food stands, music, and fireworks. The Popeye Parade is held on a Saturday morning. Before the parade there is a walk and run for anyone who wants to participate. Medals and trophies are awarded to the top runners and walkers in each age category. A Popeye T-shirt is included with each entry. Many people from different towns participate in this parade. The parade consists of local school bands, band fronts, such as dance teams and cheerleaders, floats from various businesses, fire departments, veterans representing the United States, politicians marching, clowns passing out stickers and candy, and finally horses trail the parade. Many people and businesses help sponsor the picnic and donate money and time.

== Geography ==
According to the 2010 census, Chester has a total area of 5.826 square miles (15.09 km^{2}), of which 5.81 square miles (15.05 km^{2}) (or 99.73%) is land and 0.016 square miles (0.04 km^{2}) (or 0.27%) is water.

=== Parks and historic sites ===
Part of the Middle Mississippi River National Wildlife Refuge is located along the Mississippi River at Chester.

== Demographics ==
Historical population
Census	Pop.	Note	%±
1870	1,615		—
1880	2,580		59.8%
1890	2,708		5.0%
1900	2,832		4.6%
1910	2,747		−3.0%
1920	2,904		5.7%
1930	3,922		35.1%
1940	5,110		30.3%
1950	5,389		5.5%
1960	4,460		−17.2%
1970	5,310		19.1%
1980	8,401		58.2%
1990	8,194		−2.5%
2000	8,400		2.5%
2010	8,586		2.2%
2020	6,814		−20.6%
2021 (est.)	7,645		12.2%
U.S. Decennial Census 2020

=== Racial and ethnic composition ===
Chester city, Illinois – Racial and ethnic composition Note: the US Census treats Hispanic/Latino as an ethnic category. This table excludes Latinos from the racial categories and assigns them to a separate category. Hispanics/Latinos may be of any race.
Race / Ethnicity (NH = Non-Hispanic)	Pop 2000	Pop 2010	Pop 2020	% 2000	% 2010	% 2020
White alone (NH)	4,896	5,584	4,572	94.43%	65.04%	67.10%
Black or African American alone (NH)	185	2,388	1,563	3.57%	27.81%	22.94%
Native American or Alaska Native alone (NH)	6	7	9	0.12%	0.08%	0.13%
Asian alone (NH)	11	26	16	0.21%	0.30%	0.23%
Native Hawaiian or Pacific Islander alone (NH)	2	0	0	0.04%	0.00%	0.00%
Other race alone (NH)	2	3	5	0.04%	0.03%	0.07%
Mixed race or Multiracial (NH)	44	57	138	0.85%	0.66%	2.03%
Hispanic or Latino (any race)	39	521	511	0.75%	6.07%	7.50%
Total	5,185	8,586	6,814	100.00%	100.00%	100.00%

The 2000 census accidentally excluded the inmate population of Menard Correctional Center and assigned it to Baldwin, Illinois hence the lower population.

=== 2020 census ===
As of the 2020 census, Chester had a population of 6,814. The median age was 40.0 years. 14.2% of residents were under the age of 18 and 14.3% of residents were 65 years of age or older. For every 100 females there were 208.5 males, and for every 100 females age 18 and over there were 235.9 males age 18 and over.

92.5% of residents lived in urban areas, while 7.5% lived in rural areas.

There were 1,847 households in Chester, of which 27.3% had children under the age of 18 living in them. Of all households, 42.5% were married-couple households, 20.4% were households with a male householder and no spouse or partner present, and 29.9% were households with a female householder and no spouse or partner present. About 33.2% of all households were made up of individuals and 13.8% had someone living alone who was 65 years of age or older.

There were 2,115 housing units, of which 12.7% were vacant. The homeowner vacancy rate was 3.7% and the rental vacancy rate was 4.2%.

Racial composition as of the 2020 census
Race	Number	Percent
White	4,609	67.6%
Black or African American	1,566	23.0%
American Indian and Alaska Native	11	0.2%
Asian	16	0.2%
Native Hawaiian and Other Pacific Islander	0	0.0%
Some other race	422	6.2%
Two or more races	190	2.8%

=== 2000 census ===
As of the census of 2000, there were 8,400 people, 2,018 households, and 1,283 families residing in the city. The population density was 879.9 inhabitants per square mile (339.7/km^{2}). There were 2,229 housing units at an average density of 378.3 units per square mile (146.1 units/km^{2}). The racial makeup of the city was 94.87% White, 3.59% African American, 0.15% Native American, 0.21% Asian, 0.04% Pacific Islander, 0.21% from other races, and 0.93% from two or more races. Hispanic or Latino of any race were 0.75% of the population.

There were 2,018 households, out of which 28.7% had children under the age of 18 living with them, 48.9% were married couples living together, 10.3% had a female householder with no husband present, and 36.4% were non-families. 32.1% of all households were made up of individuals, and 17.0% had someone living alone who was 65 years of age or older. The average household size was 2.32 and the average family size was 2.92.

In the city, the population was spread out, with 22.4% under the age of 18, 8.1% from 18 to 24, 27.9% from 25 to 44, 21.9% from 45 to 64, and 19.7% who were 65 years of age or older. The median age was 40 years. For every 100 females, there were 105.4 males. For every 100 females age 18 and over, there were 102.1 males.

The median income for a household in the city was $39,079, and the median income for a family was $49,426. Males had a median income of $36,103 versus $22,239 for females. The per capita income for the city was $22,190. About 5.4% of families and 9.7% of the population were below the poverty line, including 11.8% of those under age 18 and 13.7% of those age 65 or over.

=== Religious affiliations ===
There are eleven churches located in Chester. These churches consist of the New Life First Pentecostal Church, First Baptist Church, First Christian Church of Chester, Family Worship Center Assembly of God, First Presbyterian Church, First Apostolic Pentecostal Church, First United Methodist Church, Grace Church Ministries, Peace Lutheran Church ELCA, St. John Lutheran Church LCMS, and St. Mary's Help of Christians Roman Catholic Church.

== Economy ==
Large employers include the private label food company Gilster-Mary Lee, Corp., the maximum security Menard Correctional Center, and the maximum security forensics mental health center, Chester Mental Health Center.

== Government and infrastructure ==
The Illinois Department of Corrections Menard Correctional Center is located in Chester. Prior to the January 11, 2003 commutation of death row sentences, male death row inmates were housed in Menard, Tamms, and Pontiac correctional centers. After that date, only Pontiac continued to host the male death row.

=== Bridges ===
Chester is connected to Perry County, Missouri via a river bridge known as the Chester Bridge. The Chester Bridge was first constructed on August 23, 1942, as a toll bridge. Sections of this bridge were destroyed by a storm in July 1944, but it was reopened in August 1946. Tolls ceased to be collected on January 1, 1989.

== Education ==
=== Public ===
Chester Community Unit School District No. 139 consists of two schools, Chester High School and Chester Grade School.

=== Private ===
St. John's Lutheran School and St. Mary's Catholic School are Chester's parochial schools.

== Media ==
Chester now has Channel 10 through Cable TV. It broadcasts events, post announcements and upcoming community events, relays emergency notices and much more to the citizens of Chester. Students from the Chester Grade School contribute daily broadcasts from the school.

Chester's newspaper was the Herald Tribune until it ceased publication in 2022. The local radio station is KSGM.

=== Claims to fame ===
On April 11, 1842, Charles Dickens, the author of A Christmas Carol and Great Expectations, visited Chester with his wife. Mark Twain, the author of The Adventures of Tom Sawyer, a pilot on the Mississippi River between 1857 and the Civil War, supposedly on many of his trips stayed at Chester's Cliff House, a fine river hostelry. Twain also mentioned the blue windows of Chester's Cohen Home, visible from the Mississippi, in his book Life on the Mississippi.

The Chester post office contains a federally commissioned mural, Loading the Packet, painted by Fay E. Davis through the Section of Painting and Sculpture, later called the Section of Fine Arts, of the Treasury Department. A former postal employee favored the mural so strongly that he said if the building should catch fire, the mural should be saved rather than the mail.

Chester was the filming location of scenes from the 1967 movie In the Heat of the Night and was only mentioned in the 1993 movie The Fugitive.

== Notable people ==
- Shadrach Bond, first governor of Illinois
- William Hartzell, U.S. representative
- Elias Kane, U.S. senator and architect of the Constitution of Illinois
- Nora Lane, actress
- Pierre Menard, first lieutenant governor of Illinois
- E.C. Segar, creator of Popeye
- Tom Wham, game designer
