= Helen Keller Day =

American commemorative holiday

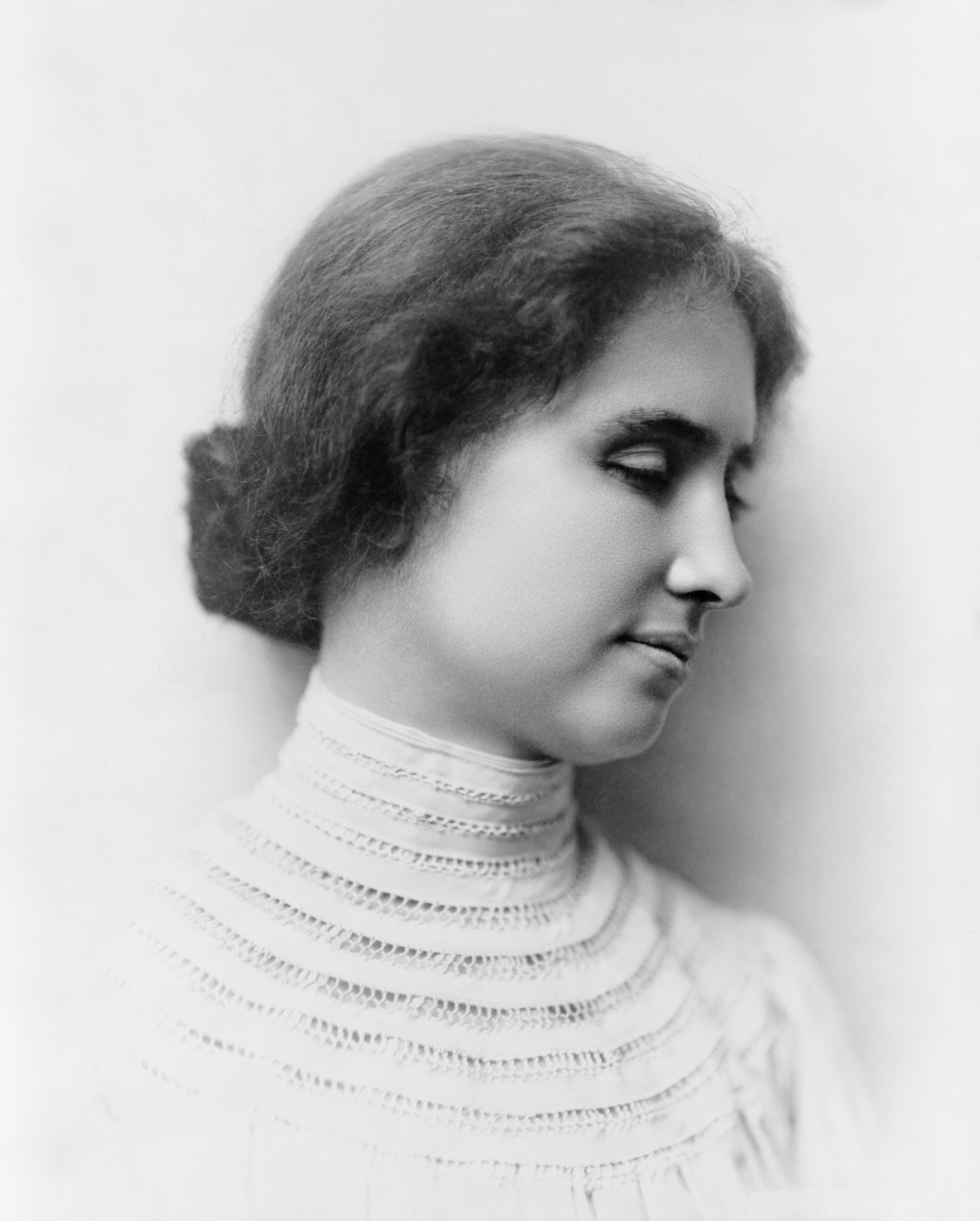
- Keller, c. 1904–1905
- Observed by: United States of America
- Type: National observance
- Date: June 27
- Next time: June 27, 2027
- Frequency: Annual

Helen Keller Day is a commemorative holiday to celebrate the birth of Helen Keller, observed on June 27 annually. The holiday observance was created by presidential proclamation in 1980 as well as by international organizations, particularly those helping the blind and the deaf. The holiday is known for its fashion show, held on June 27 annually for fundraising purposes.

== History ==
The holiday was first proclaimed on March 27, 1960, by Newark, New Jersey, mayor Leo P. Carlin. On June 7, 1960, by then Annapolis, Maryland, mayor Arthur G. Ellington where he announced Keller's 80th birthday. On June 19, 1980, President Jimmy Carter issued Proclamation #4767 to honor Helen Keller and her accomplishments.

Outside of the proclamations, the holiday is also observed by private organizations. Since 1971, the Lions Club International has declared the holiday on June 1 annually to commemorate the speech Keller gave on June 30, 1925, to spread awareness of the American Foundation for the Blind. The day is generally observed internationally through the Blind Association and other international organizations who help people with this disability. Every year on June 27, an annual fashion show is held as a fundraiser in Lackawanna County, Pennsylvania.

== Origins ==
Helen Adams Keller (June 27, 1880 – June 1, 1968) was an American author, political activist, and lecturer. She was the first deafblind person to earn a bachelor of arts degree. The story of how Keller's teacher, Anne Sullivan, broke through the isolation imposed by a near-complete lack of language, allowing the girl to blossom as she learned to communicate, has become widely known through the dramatic depictions of the 1959 play and 1962 film The Miracle Worker. Her birthplace in West Tuscumbia, Alabama, is now a museum and sponsors an annual "Helen Keller Day". Her birthday on June 27 is commemorated as Helen Keller Day in the U.S. state of Pennsylvania and was authorized at the federal level by presidential proclamation by President Jimmy Carter in 1980, the 100th anniversary of her birth.
