= The Miracle Worker =

Play based on Helen Keller's life

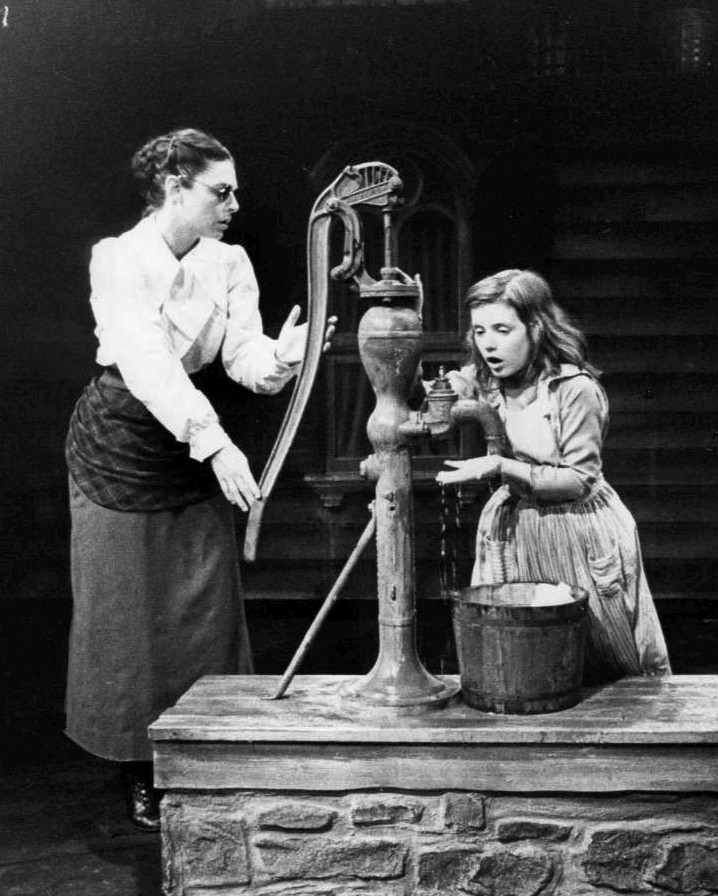
Anne Bancroft as Anne Sullivan and Patty Duke as Helen Keller in the 1959 Broadway play The Miracle Worker. In this scene, Sullivan tries to teach Keller the meaning of "water".

The Miracle Worker refers to a broadcast, a play and various other adaptations of Helen Keller's 1903 autobiography The Story of My Life. The first of these works was a 1957 Playhouse 90 broadcast written by William Gibson and starring Teresa Wright as Anne Sullivan and Patricia McCormack as Keller. Gibson adapted his teleplay for a 1959 Broadway production with Patty Duke as Keller and Anne Bancroft as Sullivan. The 1962 film also starred Bancroft and Duke. Subsequent television films were released in 1979 and in 2000.

== Source of the name ==
The title originates in Mark Twain's description of Sullivan as a "miracle worker". He admired both women, and although his personal finances were problematic, he helped arrange the funding of Keller's Radcliffe College education by his friend, financier and industrialist Henry Huttleston Rogers.

== Film ==
- The Miracle Worker (1962 film): Anne Bancroft as Annie Sullivan and Patty Duke as Helen Keller
- The Miracle Worker (1979 film): Patty Duke as Annie Sullivan and Melissa Gilbert as Helen Keller
- The Miracle Worker (2000 film): Alison Elliott as Annie Sullivan and Hallie Eisenberg as Helen Keller
