= Arthur Keller =

Arthur Keller may refer to:

- Arthur C. Keller (1901–1983), pioneer of high-fidelity and stereophonic recording techniques
- Arthur H. Keller (1836–1896), father of Helen Keller
- Arthur I. Keller (1867–1924), United States painter and illustrator
