= The Frost King =

Short story by Helen Keller

- Short story by Helen Keller
- Original title: Autumn Leaves
- Country: United States
- Language: English
- Genre: Fantasy literature

Publication
- Published in: Perkins annual report
- Publication type: Journal
- Publisher: Perkins School for the Blind
- Publication date: 1891

"The Frost King" (originally titled "Autumn Leaves") is a short story about king jacking Frost written by Helen Keller, then 11. Keller's teacher, Anne Sullivan, had mentioned that the autumn leaves were "painted ruby, emerald, gold, crimson, and brown", and Keller, by her own account, imagined fairies doing the work. Keller wrote a story about how a cask of jewels, being transported by fairy servants, had melted in the sun and covered the leaves.

As a birthday gift, Keller sent the story to Michael Anagnos, the head of the Perkins School for the Blind, who published the story in the January 1892 edition of The Mentor, the Perkins alumni magazine. It was picked up by The Goodson Gazette, a journal on deaf-blind education, based in Virginia.

== Controversy ==
A friend, one of the Perkins teachers, informed the Gazette that Keller's story was a reproduction of "Frost Fairies" from Margaret Canby's book Birdie and His Fairy Friends.

The Gazette ran both stories, and the editor commented that he believed it a deliberate attempt at fraud by Keller's handlers. Keller insisted she had no memory of having read the book or having had it read to her, but passages in her letters from the period, which she describes as "dreams", strongly resembled other episodes in the book.

In Sullivan's account of the incident, addressed to John Hitz of the Volta Bureau, she had investigated to see who could have read the story to Helen or even owned a copy of the book. It seemed her own mentor, Sophia Hopkins, had taken charge of the then eight-year-old Keller while Sullivan was on vacation, and had read the book to her through fingerspelling. Keller stated that she remembered nothing of that and that she was devastated that people she had loved and trusted would accuse her of lying.

Similar stories
Father Frost
Jack Frost folklore
Old Man Winter
References to King Frost in popular culture include the temporal "The reign of King Frost had begun" in a 1920s dime romance novel.

Anagnos was apparently willing to believe that Keller had simply adapted the story from buried memories. However, Keller further discussed the matter with one of the Perkins teachers and, as she remembered it, "something I said made her think she detected in my words a confession" that she had knowingly plagiarized the story. The teacher's own detailed account, which was only discovered in 1978 and published in Joseph Lash's Helen and Teacher, confirms that Keller told her Sullivan had read her "Frost Fairies" the previous fall and that she had adapted her own story out of that one.

By all accounts, the teacher reported what Keller had told her to Anagnos. A storm of outrage swept through the school, apparently headed by the teachers. Keller's biographers, particularly Joseph P. Lash, suggest that they were also incensed by the fact that Sullivan and Keller used the facilities although they were neither employed by nor officially registered with the school.

An in-house "trial" ensued to determine whether or not Sullivan had deliberately falsified Keller's abilities; eight teachers interrogated the 12-year-old child for two hours and fought the issue to a draw, the tie-breaking vote being cast by Anagnos in Keller's favor. Although Sullivan protested that "all use of language is imitative, and one's style is made up of all other styles that one has met", and even Canby came forward to say that Keller's version was superior to her own, Anagnos never regained his faith in Sullivan or Keller and described them years later as "a living lie". Keller had a nervous breakdown over the incident, and never wrote fiction again.

In 1978, an anonymously written typescript, "Miss Sullivan's Methods", was uncovered at the Perkins Institute library. Joseph Lash describes it as an analysis of The Story of My Life, probably written by David Prescott Hall in 1906 just after the death of Michael Anagnos. The text identifies many of Keller's letters as containing paraphrases of Canby's writing as well as verbatim passages. Keller and Sullivan cited some of them in their own explanation of what happened, and Sullivan stated several times Keller's writings at the time contained extensive paraphrases of either what she had read or what she had had read to her. The document also contains the text of the letter written by the Perkins teacher in which she transcribed the conversation with Keller that had led to the inquiry.

Lash believes the author of the document was trying to prove Sullivan, not Hopkins, had read Birdie and his Fairy Friends to Keller and had done so the same autumn, not four years previously. He concludes that if that was the case:

- Keller wrote "The Frost King" as another of her paraphrased stories, which was similar to what she had been writing in her letters of the period.
- Sullivan, who always checked Keller's writings before allowing them to be mailed, would have recognized "The Frost King" as a paraphrase but considered it to be sufficiently original that she passed it on as Keller's own work.
- Sullivan may not have understood what plagiarism is.
- When Keller was accused, Sullivan attempted a cover-up by denying she had read the Birdie stories and impressing upon Keller the importance of stating that Hopkins had read her the stories years before.

The story was later published in Keller's 1903 biography with a complete analysis of both stories and the incident. Mark Twain, after reading about this incident from a copy of the biography Helen had given him, was inspired to write his famous "St Patrick's Day 1903" letter to her in which he described the controversy as "owlishly idiotic and grotesque".
