= Ivy Green =

Historic house in Alabama, United States

- Ivy Green (Helen Keller Birthplace*)
- U.S. National Register of Historic Places
- U.S. National Historic Landmark
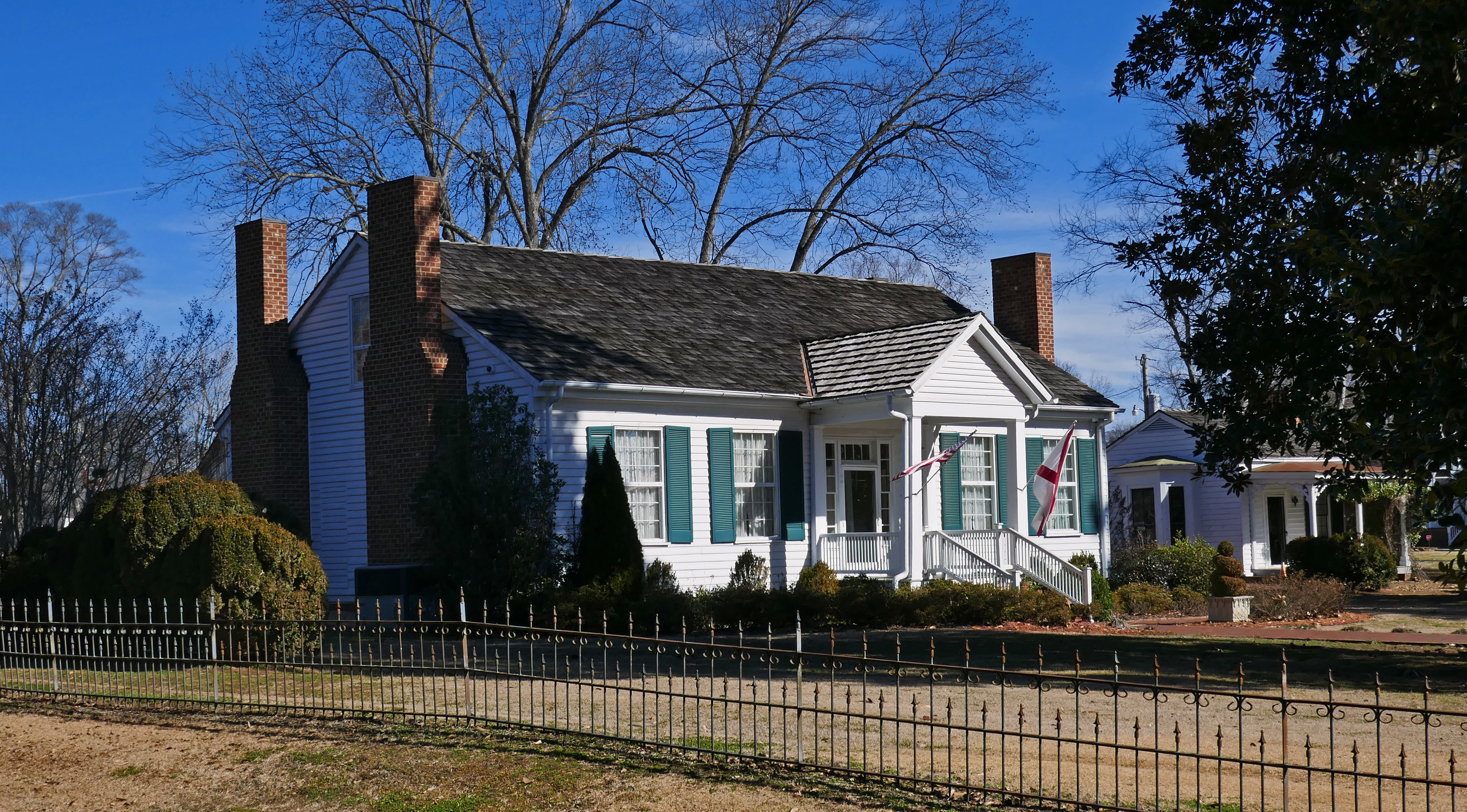
- Ivy Green in 2018

- Location within Alabama Location within the United States
- Location: 300 West North Commons, Tuscumbia, Alabama, United States
- Coordinates: 34°44′22″N 87°42′24″W
- Area: 10 acres (4.0 ha)
- Built: 1820
- Architect: David Keller; Mary Fairfax Moore
- NRHP reference No.: 70000101

Significant dates
- Added to NRHP: August 25, 1970
- Designated NHL: March 31, 1992

Ivy Green is a historic house museum at 300 West North Commons in Tuscumbia, Alabama, United States. Built in 1820, it was the birthplace and childhood home of Helen Keller (1880–1968), who became well known after overcoming deaf-blind conditions to communicate; she became an author and public speaker. Designated as a National Historic Landmark, it is now operated as a museum honoring and interpreting Keller's life.

== Description and history ==
Ivy Green is located in a residential area north of downtown Tuscumbia, on the north side of West North Commons at Keller Lane. The property's principal features are the main house, the birthplace cottage, and the well. The main house is a 1 1/2-story frame structure with a gabled roof and clapboarded exterior. It has a five-bay facade, with sash windows around a roughly centered entrance. The entrance is sheltered by a gabled portico, and is framed by sidelight and transom windows. Nearby stands the birthplace cottage, a modest structure originally built as a plantation office. It was refurbished as a bridal suite for Arthur H. Keller's second wife, who gave birth to Helen Keller in 1880. In between the two buildings stand the well and pump that played a key role in Helen Keller's development.

The main house at Ivy Green was built in 1820 by David Keller, Helen Keller's grandfather. The well pump is where Helen Keller first achieved a communicated breakthrough with her teacher and companion, Anne Sullivan.

In 1954 the property was adapted as a museum dedicated to Helen Keller. A fire in 1972 caused minor damage and resulted in the donation of additional materials by the Keller family.

On May 10, 1981, the Helen Keller Memorial Gazebo was dedicated at Ivy Green by the Southern Dames of America and a historic marker was placed by their national president, Margaret Boatright.

== The Miracle Worker ==
Every summer, for over 30 years, the Helen Keller Foundation has presented outdoor performances here of William Gibson's The Miracle Worker, a play about Keller and Sullivan. The play is usually performed from early June through mid-July. It is especially popular during the Helen Keller Festival held in Tuscumbia every June.

== Gallery ==
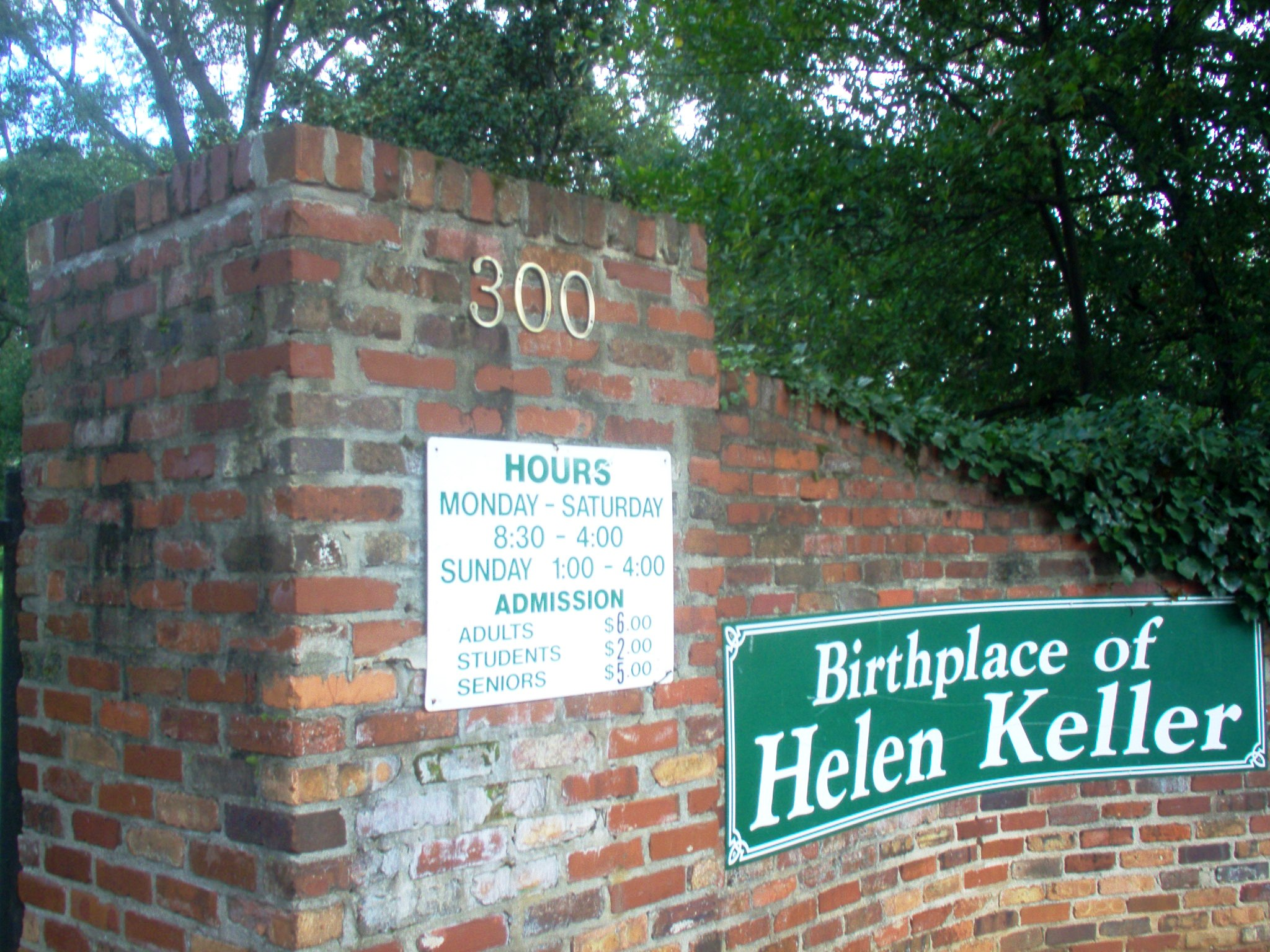
Entrance to Ivy Green

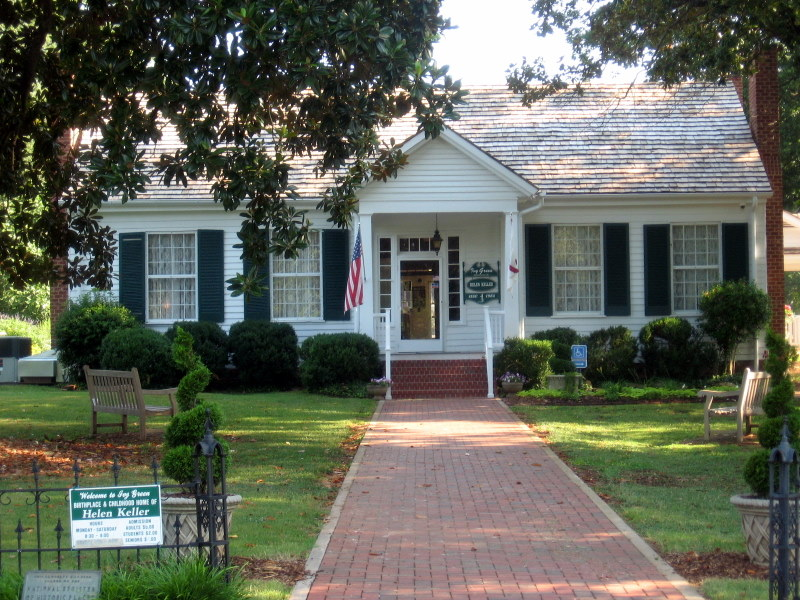
The home in 2009

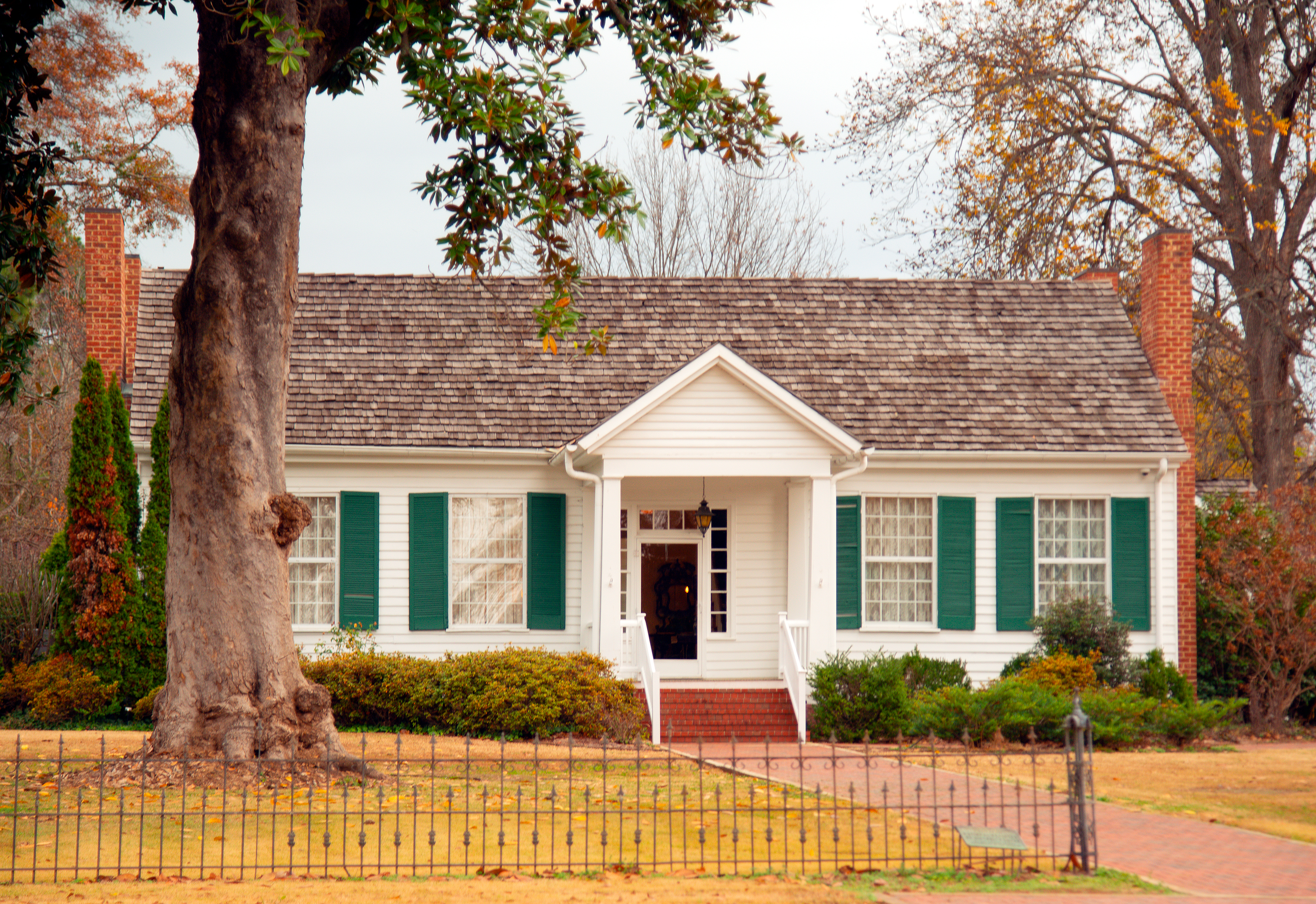
The home in 2025

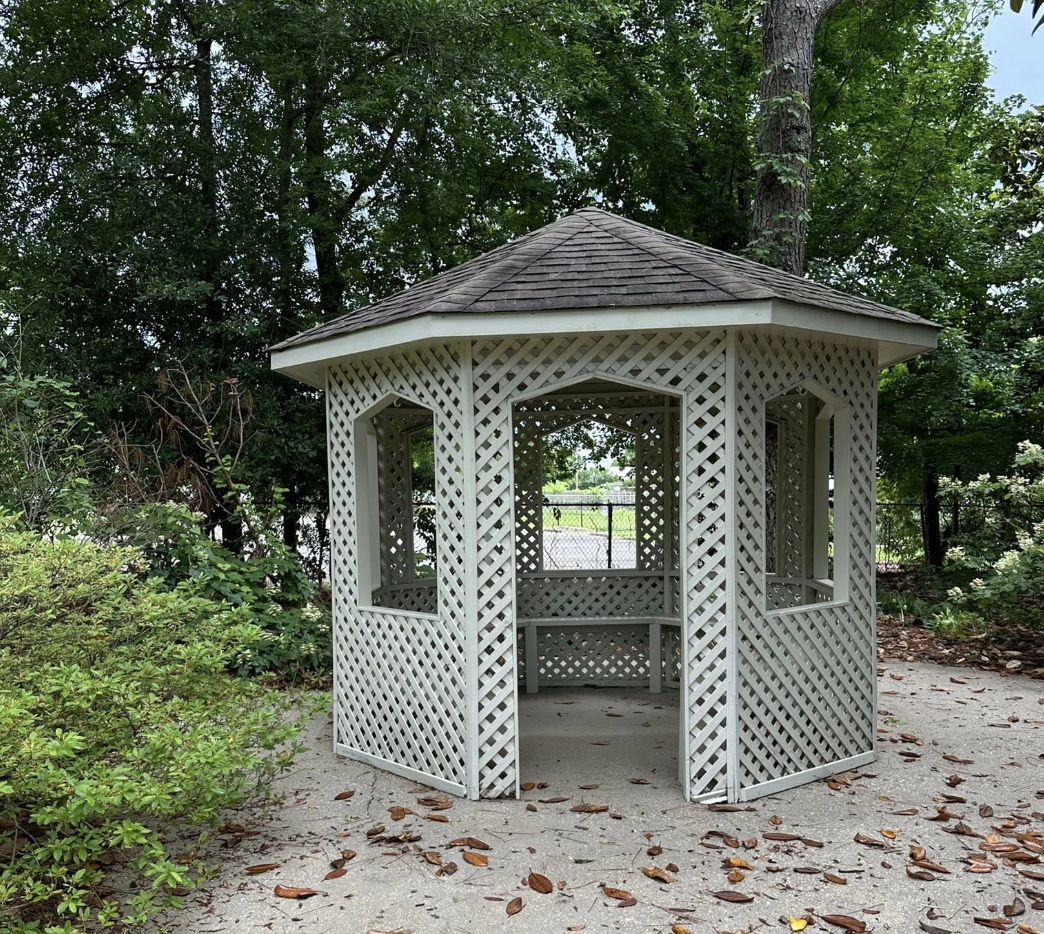
The Helen Keller Memorial Gazebo

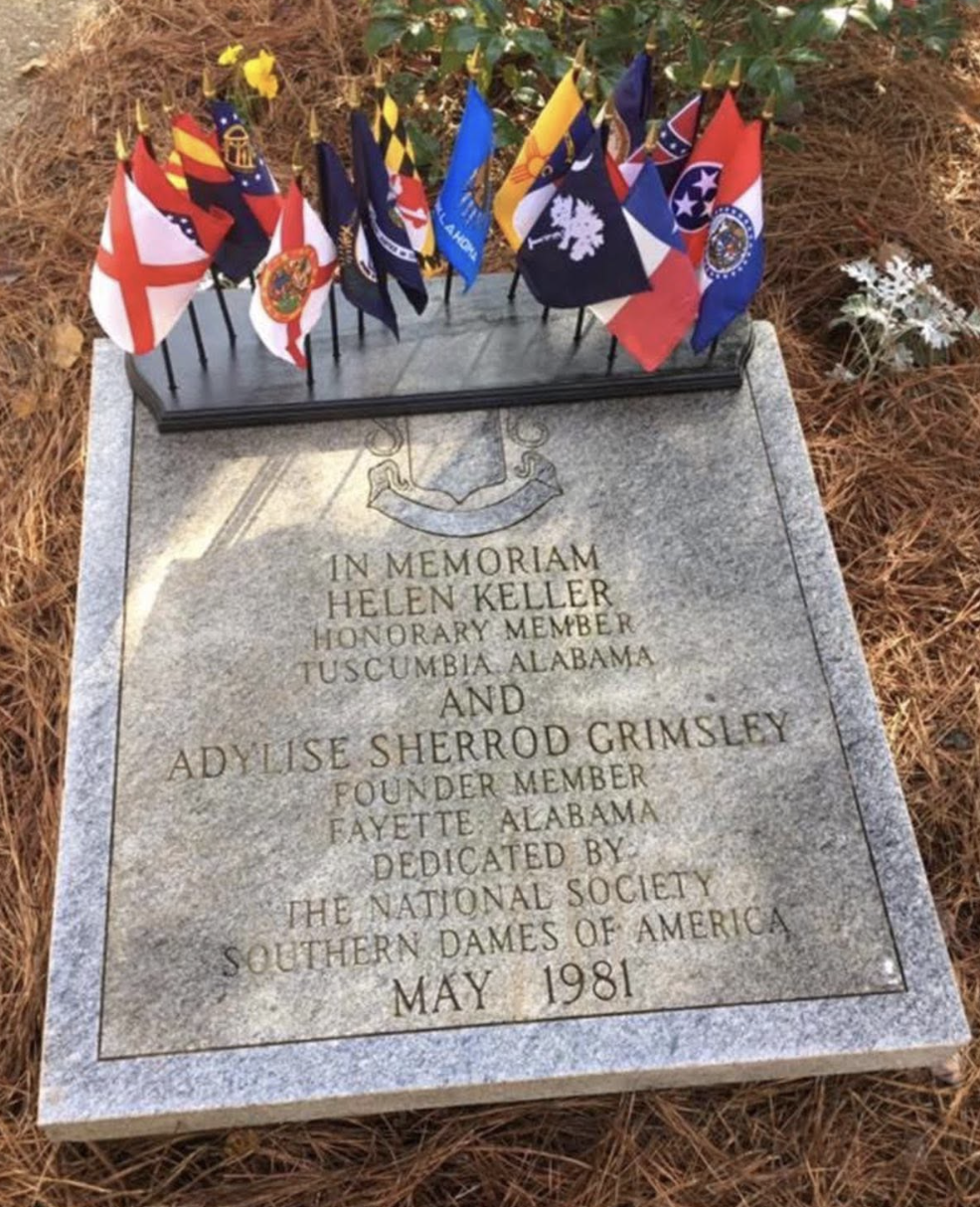
Historical marker placed by the Southern Dames

== See also ==
- List of National Historic Landmarks in Alabama
