= Helen Keller: The Miracle Continues =

1984 television film directed by Alan Gibson

- Genre: Drama
- Based on: Helen and Teacher: The Story of Helen Keller and Anne Sullivan Macy by Joseph P. Lash
- Written by: John McGreevey
- Directed by: Alan Gibson
- Starring: Blythe Danner; Mare Winningham; Perry King; Vera Miles
- Music by: J. A. C. Redford
- Country of origin: United States
- Original language: English

Production
- Executive producer: David Lawrence
- Cinematography: Frank Watts
- Editor: John Farrell
- Running time: 100 minutes
- Production companies: 20th Century Fox Television; Castle Combe

Original release
- Network: Syndication
- Release: April 23, 1984

Helen Keller: The Miracle Continues is a 1984 American made-for-television biographical film and a semi-sequel to the 1979 television version of The Miracle Worker. It is a drama based on the life of the deafblind and mute historical figure Helen Keller and premiered in syndication on April 23, 1984, as part of Operation Prime Time syndicated programming.

== Summary ==
The book film covers the period of Helen Keller's life from her college years at Radcliffe through her writing of The Story of My Life assisted by John Macy, who falls in love with and marries Keller's teacher and companion, Anne Sullivan. Helen wants to live a full life but is hampered by her actual disabilities and by people's attitudes and beliefs about the disabled at that time. Sullivan is hampered by psychological problems from her own past, as well as by her symbiotic, almost codependent bond with Helen, which affects Macy to the extent that he eventually self-destructs into alcoholism. Keller and Sullivan raise money by going on the road with a lecture tour where they describe her education.

== Cast ==
- Blythe Danner as Anne Sullivan
- Mare Winningham as Helen Keller
- Perry King as John Macy
- Vera Miles as Kate Keller
- Jack Warden as Mark Twain
- Peter Cushing as Professor Charles Copeland
- Alexander Knox as Mr. Gilman
