= Helen Keller International =

U.S. nonprofit organization

Helen Keller Intl
- Formation: 1915; 111 years ago
- Type: International NGO
- Location(s): 39 Broadway, Suite 1505; New York City, US
- President & CEO: Sarah Bouchie
- Website: helenkellerintl.org

Helen Keller International is a US-based nonprofit organization that combats the causes and consequences of blindness and malnutrition by establishing programs based on evidence and research in vision, health, and nutrition. Founded in 1915 by Helen Keller and George A. Kessler, the organization's mission is to save the sight and lives of the most vulnerable and disadvantaged.

Helen Keller's three major areas of expertise are eye health, healthcare, and nutrition. Its eye health programs address the major causes of blindness in the world, including cataract, trachoma, and onchocerciasis, and treating refractive error. Its nutrition programs include vitamin A, iron/folate, and multi-micronutrient supplementation, fortification of commonly used foods, dietary diversification, community- and school gardening, as well as school health activities, the promotion of breastfeeding and complementary feeding, and nutritional surveillance to provide critical data to governments and other development partners. Each year, Helen Keller's programs benefit millions of children and families.

== Background ==
George A. Kessler, also known as the "Champagne King," was a passenger on the RMS Lusitania in 1915 when it was torpedoed by a German U-boat. When he was fighting for his life in the cold waters of the Atlantic off the coast of Ireland, he vowed that if he survived, he would devote much of his time and substantial financial resources to a worthwhile cause. The cause he chose was assisting Allied soldiers blinded in the service. He later befriended Helen Keller and helped found the organization that became Helen Keller Intl.

As of 2024, Helen Keller works in 20 countries around the world in Africa, Asia and the United States. Global headquarters are located in New York City, and programs are also developed and administered through regional offices, currently located in Dakar and Phnom Penh, as well as through 18 country offices and an additional development office in Paris. Helen Keller has country offices in Burkina Faso, Bangladesh, Cameroon, Cambodia, Côte d'Ivoire, Democratic Republic of Congo, Guinea, Kenya, Madagascar, Mali, Mozambique, Nepal, Niger, Nigeria, Philippines, Senegal, Sierra Leone, and Tanzania.

== Activities ==
=== Nutrition Surveillance Project (NSP) ===
This program was started by Helen Keller in 1990 to monitor the health impact of severe flooding in Bangladesh. It is a collaborative effort which involves the Government of Bangladesh (GOB), Intl and local Non-Governmental Organisations (NGO). The programme essentially provides up-to-date and dependable information on the prevalence of malnutrition and morbidity in children, household socioeconomic characteristics and food prices. Data are collected by authorities in selected rural districts and urban slums in the country. The NSP data have also been used by the GOB to improve or develop nutrition and health programmes such as the national vitamin A capsule distribution program. NSP has proven to be an excellent tool to aid long-term planning in health policies, to provide input for programme management and evaluation and to give timely warning of the need for intervention to prevent critical deterioration in food consumption.

=== Diabetic retinopathy ===
Diabetic retinopathy is a leading cause of blindness. Helen Keller helps prepare health care systems to identify and treat diabetic retinopathy. In collaboration with Chittagong Eye Infirmary and Training Complex and the Diabetes Association of Bangladesh, Helen Keller began a pilot project in 2009 to improve patients' access to sight-saving diabetic retinopathy treatment regardless of their ability to pay.

=== Homestead Food Production (HFP) ===
This programme aims to reduce malnutrition and increase food availability through creation of home gardens and small farms for raising livestock. In collaboration with local NGOs, Helen Keller provides the seedlings, chicks, start up materials and technical skills to communities. Varieties of fruits and vegetables are grown in these home gardens to provide supplies of nutrient rich foods all year round. The objectives are to increase participants' micro-nutritional intakes by consuming a wider variety of foods, develop communities and empower women.

HFP started in 1990 as a pilot project in Bangladesh with 1000 households participating. It includes nutrition education to complement home gardening. Following initial success, Helen Keller launched the NGO Gardening and Nutrition Education Surveillance Project (NGNESP) which expanded the programme to communities across the country in 1993. By 2012, 900,000 households and 4.5 million people are participating in the project, with the help of 52 local NGOs. Women organise 90% of the gardens.

A 2002 research shows that in a three months period, households participating in the HFP consumed had a daily per capita consumption of vegetables of 160g, more than double of the 71g for non-participating households.

=== Vitamin A supplementation ===
Vitamin A deficiency causes blindness and increases mortality rate for young children and women. The deficiency can be prevented with two doses of high potency vitamin A capsules every year. With the cost of providing the capsules at $1 per person per year, vitamin A supplementation is a cost-efficient initiative.

Helen Keller started the vitamin A supplementation project in Bangladesh in 1978. Its partnership with the GOB began in 1982. The Bangladesh Nutritional Blindness Study was conducted, and it indicated that there was a high prevalence of vitamin A deficiency. By 2005, vitamin A deficiency among children 12 to 59 months, as measured by prevalence of night blindness, has decreased to 0.04% from 3.76% in 1982.

=== Leadership ===
Sarah Bouchie is President and Chief Executive Officer, joining in November 2023. Prior to Helen Keller, Bouchie served as Chief Impact Officer at the LEGO Foundation and has led institutional fundraising, advocacy, and program efforts for organizations including ChildFund Intl, CARE USA, Save the Children, and the Aga Khan Foundation.

== Partnerships ==
Helen Keller is a partner in Compact2025, a partnership that develops and disseminates evidence-based advice to politicians and other decision-makers aimed at ending hunger and undernutrition in the coming 10 years, by 2025.

== Recognition ==
Helen Keller has received the 2014 BBVA Foundation Frontiers of Knowledge Award in the Development Cooperation category for agricultural programs that help families and villages to raise their own nutritious foods. "Hunger and low dietary diversity reduce cognitive function, physical capacity, resistance to disease and quality of life and lifetime earnings. Heller Keller champions Homestead Food Production, an innovative, interdisciplinary program that promotes improved agricultural and nutritional practices in a synergistic fashion. This approach is mostly applied to communities that have difficult access to labor and food markets," in the words of the jury's citation. In 2014, they also won the Kravis Prize in Nonprofit Leadership.

The vitamin A supplementation program is, as of 2024, one of GiveWell's top four recommendations. GiveWell estimates that the cost to avert a death through this program ranges from $1000 to $8500 on average.
