= The Miracle Worker (1962 film) =

1962 film by Arthur Penn

- Original poster
- Directed by: Arthur Penn
- Screenplay by: William Gibson
- Based on: The Miracle Worker by William Gibson
- Produced by: Fred Coe
- Starring: Anne Bancroft; Patty Duke; Victor Jory; Inga Swenson; Andrew Prine; Kathleen Comegys
- Cinematography: Ernesto Caparrós
- Edited by: Aram Avakian
- Music by: Laurence Rosenthal
- Production company: Playfilm Productions
- Distributed by: United Artists
- Release dates: May 8, 1962 (Sutton Theater); May 23, 1962 (United States)
- Running time: 106 minutes
- Country: United States
- Language: English
- Budget: $1.3 million
- Box office: $2 million (US/Canada)

The Miracle Worker is a 1962 American biographical film about Anne Sullivan, blind tutor to Helen Keller, directed by Arthur Penn. The screenplay by William Gibson is based on his 1959 play of the same title, which originated as a 1957 broadcast of the television anthology series Playhouse 90. Gibson's secondary source material was The Story of My Life, the 1903 autobiography of Helen Keller.

The film went on to be an instant critical success and a moderate commercial success. The film was nominated for five Academy Awards, including Best Director for Arthur Penn; and won two awards, Best Actress for Anne Bancroft and Best Supporting Actress for Patty Duke, the latter of whom, at age 16, became the youngest competitive Oscar winner at the time. (Note: The record was surpassed by Tatum O'Neal in 1974, who won the Academy Award for Best Supporting Actress at the age of 10 for Paper Moon.)

In 2024, the film was selected for preservation in the United States National Film Registry by the Library of Congress as being "culturally, historically, or aesthetically significant".

== Plot ==
Young Helen Keller, deaf, blind, and mute since infancy due to a severe illness, is frustrated and angry by her inability to communicate and subject to frequent uncontrollable outbursts. Unable to deal with her, her terrified and helpless parents contact the Perkins School for the Blind for assistance. In response, they send Anne Sullivan, a former student, to the Keller home as a tutor. A battle of wills ensues as Anne breaks down Helen's walls of silence and darkness through persistence, tough love, and sheer stubbornness, starting by teaching Helen to make a connection between her hand signs and the objects in Helen's world for which they stand.

== Cast ==
- Anne Bancroft as Anne Sullivan
- Patty Duke as Helen Keller
- Victor Jory as Captain Arthur Keller
- Inga Swenson as Kate Keller
- Andrew Prine as James Keller
- Kathleen Comegys as Aunt Ev
- Beah Richards as Viney (uncredited)
- Jack Hollander as Mr. Anagnos (uncredited)
- Michael Darden as Percy (uncredited)
- Dale Ellen Bethea as Martha (uncredited)
- John Bliss as Admissions Officer (uncredited)
- Judith Lowry as 1st Crone (uncredited)
- William F. Haddock as 2nd Crone (uncredited)
- Helen Ludlam as 3rd Crone (uncredited)

== Production ==
Despite Anne Bancroft's award-winning performance as Anne Sullivan in the Broadway production, United Artists executives wanted Elizabeth Taylor to be cast in this role in the film adaptation. However, Arthur Penn (who had also directed the stage production) insisted on using Bancroft. As a result, the studio viewed the film as a risky prospect and granted Penn only a tight budget of $1,300,000 (of which $200,000 was spent in purchasing the rights to the play).

In addition, despite the fact that Patty Duke had played Helen Keller in the play, she almost did not get the part. The reason was that at 15 she was considered too old to portray a seven-year-old girl, but after Bancroft had been cast as Anne, Duke was chosen to play Helen in the film.

For the dining room battle scene, in which Anne tries to teach Helen proper table manners, both Bancroft and Duke wore padding beneath their costumes to prevent serious bruising during the intense physical skirmish. The nine-minute sequence required three cameras and took five days to film.

The film was shot at Big Sky Ranch in Simi Valley, California, and in Gladstone and Middletown, New Jersey.

== Release ==
=== Theatrical ===
The Miracle Worker received its world premiere at the Sutton Theater in New York City on May 8, 1962, as a benefit for the Research to Prevent Blindness, Inc., before being released in theaters on May 23, 1962.

== Reception ==
In his review in The New York Times, Bosley Crowther wrote:

The absolutely tremendous and unforgettable display of physically powerful acting that Anne Bancroft and Patty Duke put on in William Gibson's stage play The Miracle Worker is repeated by them in the film ... But because the physical encounters between the two ... seem to be more frequent and prolonged than they were in the play and are shown in close-ups, which dump the passion and violence right into your lap, the sheer rough-and-tumble of the drama becomes more dominant than it was on the stage ... The bruising encounters between the two ... are intensely significant of the drama and do excite strong emotional response. But the very intensity of them and the fact that it is hard to see the difference between the violent struggle to force the child to obey ... and the violent struggle to make her comprehend words makes for sameness in these encounters and eventually an exhausting monotony. This is the disadvantage of so much energy. However, Miss Bancroft's performance does bring to life and reveal a wondrous woman with great humor and compassion as well as athletic skill. And little Miss Duke, in those moments when she frantically pantomimes her bewilderment and desperate groping, is both gruesome and pitiable.

TV Guide rates the film 4 1/2 out of a possible five stars and calls it "a harrowing, painfully honest, sometimes violent journey, astonishingly acted and rendered".

Time Out London wrote:

It's a stunningly impressive piece of work ... deriving much of its power from the performances. Patty Duke and Anne Bancroft spark off each other with a violence and emotional honesty rarely seen in the cinema, lighting up each other's loneliness, vulnerability, and plain fear. What is in fact astonishing is the way that, while constructing a piece of very carefully directed and intelligently written melodrama, Penn manages to avoid sentimentality or even undue optimism about the value of Helen's education, and the way he achieves such a feeling of raw spontaneity in the acting.

On the review aggregator website Rotten Tomatoes, 96% of 27 critics' reviews are positive, with an average rating of 7.9/10. Metacritic, which uses a weighted average, assigned the film a score of 83 out of 100, based on 7 critics, indicating "universal acclaim".

== Awards and honors ==
| Award | Category | Nominee(s) | Result |
|---|---|---|---|
| Academy Awards | Best Director | Arthur Penn | Nominated |
| Academy Awards | Best Actress | Anne Bancroft | Won |
| Academy Awards | Best Supporting Actress | Patty Duke | Won |
| Academy Awards | Best Adapted Screenplay | William Gibson | Nominated |
| Academy Awards | Best Costume Design | Ruth Morley | Nominated |
| Belgian Film Critics Association | Grand Prix | | Won |
| British Academy Film Awards | Best Film from any Source | | Nominated |
| British Academy Film Awards | Best Foreign Actress | Anne Bancroft | Won |
| Directors Guild of America Awards | Outstanding Directorial Achievement in Motion Pictures | Arthur Penn | Nominated |
| Golden Globe Awards | Best Motion Picture – Drama | | Nominated |
| Golden Globe Awards | Best Actress in a Motion Picture – Drama | Anne Bancroft | Nominated |
| Golden Globe Awards | Best Supporting Actress – Motion Picture | Patty Duke | Nominated |
| Golden Globe Awards | Most Promising Newcomer – Female | Patty Duke | Won |
| Laurel Awards | Top Drama | | Nominated |
| Laurel Awards | Top Female Dramatic Performance | Anne Bancroft | Nominated |
| Laurel Awards | Top Female Supporting Performance | Patty Duke | Won |
| National Board of Review Awards | Top Ten Films | | 3rd Place |
| National Board of Review Awards | Best Actress | Anne Bancroft | Won |
| Photoplay Awards | Gold Medal | | Won |
| San Sebastián International Film Festival | OCIC Award | Arthur Penn | Won |
| San Sebastián International Film Festival | Best Actress | Anne Bancroft | Won |
| Turkish Film Critics Association Awards | Best Foreign Film | | Nominated |
| Writers Guild of America Awards | Best Written American Drama | William Gibson | Nominated |

Other honors The film is recognized by American Film Institute in these lists:

- 2003: AFI's 100 Years...100 Heroes & Villains:
  - Annie Sullivan – Nominated Hero
- 2005: AFI's 100 Years of Film Scores – Nominated
- 2006: AFI's 100 Years...100 Cheers – #15

== See also ==
- List of American films of 1962
- The Miracle Worker (1979 film)
- The Miracle Worker (2000 film)
- Black (2005 film)
- List of films featuring the deaf and hard of hearing
