= My Religion (Keller book) =

Book by Helen Keller

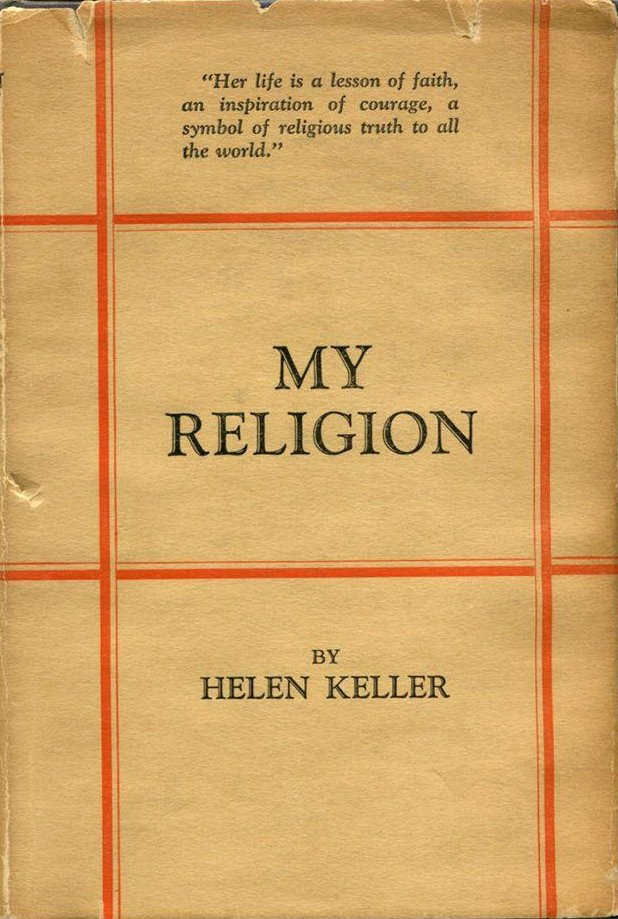
- Cover of the first edition published in 1927
- Author: Helen Keller
- Genre: Spiritual autobiography
- Publisher: Doubleday, Page & Company
- Publication date: 1927

My Religion is a 1927 book by Helen Keller. It was written as a tribute to Emanuel Swedenborg, whom Keller called "one of the noblest champions true Christianity has ever known". The book is regarded as Keller's spiritual autobiography. In it, she writes, "the teachings of Emanuel Swedenborg have been my light, and a staff in my hand and by his vision splendid I am attended on my way".

The original publication was loosely put together and hastily printed by Doubleday, Page & Company. Nevertheless, it sold well in 1927 and has remained in print since. In 1994, Ray Silverman, a Swedenborgian minister and literary scholar, thoroughly revised and edited My Religion, organizing the eight unwieldy sections of the first edition into twelve distinct chapters with subheadings to clarify their contents. Furthermore, important materials not present in the first edition were added to elucidate and expand the text. Other revisions included modernization of several words and phrases, substitution of inclusive language where appropriate, correction of spelling and typographical errors, alteration of punctuation to conform to modern standards, and emendation of a few historical inaccuracies. Extra paragraph breaks were added and a very few passages that distracted from the main messages were delicately pruned. These revisions were negligible next to all that was retained.

== 2000 edition as Light in My Darkness ==
In 2000, an edition of My Religion was published by Swedenborg Foundation Publishers together with an article titled "....." that was originally published in Guideposts magazine in 1956, together as Light in My Darkness.

The article "....." was written when Keller was 76 years old. Significantly, it establishes that Keller was a lifelong Swedenborgian. In it, she writes:

Since my seventeenth year, I have tried to live according to the teachings of Emanuel Swedenborg. By "church" he did not mean an ecclesiastical organization, but a spiritual fellowship of thoughtful men and women who spend their lives for a service to mankind that outlasts them. He called it a civilization that was to be born of a healthy, universal religion—goodwill, mutual understanding, service from each to all, regardless of dogma or ritual.

Also included in the 2000 edition is a quotation from Keller's last published book, Teacher (1955). In it she speaks of her undimmed enthusiasm for Swedenborg's teachings. She does this by first quoting the poet Walt Whitman, who wrote: "O Spirit, as a runner strips / Upon a windy afternoon / Be unencumbered of what troubles you— / Arise with grace / And greatly go, with the wind upon your face."

Keller adds, "In that state of exhilaration I had accepted the teachings of Emanuel Swedenborg, had drunk in his interpretation of the Bible, fearless, reverent, yet as unconfined as the sun, the clouds, the sea."

The title change from My Religion to Light in My Darkness is significant. The new title is taken from one of Keller's poetic statements: "I know that life is given us so that we may grow in love. And I believe that God is in me as the sun is in the color and fragrance of the flower, the Light in my darkness, the Voice in my silence."
