= The Miracle Worker (2000 film) =

2000 US television film directed by Nadia Tass

- Based on: The Miracle Worker by William Gibson
- Written by: Monte Merrick
- Directed by: Nadia Tass
- Starring: Alison Elliott; Hallie Eisenberg; Lucas Black; Kate Greenhouse; David Strathairn
- Music by: William Goldstein
- Country of origin: United States
- Original language: English

Production
- Executive producers: Peter M. Green; Charles Hirschhorn
- Producer: Suzy Beugen-Bishop
- Cinematography: David Parker
- Editor: Maryann Brandon
- Running time: 95 minutes
- Production companies: Fountain Productions; Walt Disney Television

Original release
- Network: ABC
- Release: November 12, 2000

The Miracle Worker is a 2000 American made-for-television biographical film based on the 1959 play of the same title by William Gibson. Directed by Nadia Tass and written by Monte Merrick, the film is based on the life of Helen Keller and Anne Sullivan’s struggles to teach her. Starring Hallie Kate Eisenberg as Keller and Alison Elliott as Sullivan, the film premiered on ABC as part of The Wonderful World of Disney on November 12, 2000.

Gibson's original source material was The Story of My Life, the 1903 autobiography of Helen Keller. The play was adapted for the screen twice before, in 1962 and 1979.

== Plot ==
The film focuses on Anne Sullivan's struggle to draw the young Helen Keller, a blind and prelingually deaf girl, out of her world of darkness and silence during the 1880s. Helen has been unable to communicate with her family except through physical temper tantrums since an illness took her eyesight and hearing from her at the age of 19 months old. She is allowed to eat other people's food with her hands, knock over or break items, and basically do whatever else she desires. All of this while being looked at with pity by her family. Her family loves her, but they are all convinced she is a dumb, soft-brained, and savage child with the intelligence of an animal who will never learn anything. She is barely pacified with candy when she throws a tantrum, and is headed toward mental institutionalization in an asylum when Anne enters her life as Helen's parents' last-ditch effort to avoid the inevitable.

Plagued with vision problems of her own and orphaned at a young age, Anne has the right mix of steeliness, empathy and patience to turn her young student's behavior around and teach her language. Anne's job as Helen's teacher is made more difficult by Helen's imperious plantation-owner father, Captain Arthur, and her overly soft-hearted mother, Kate, when they doubt her authority and challenge her methods. Anne's goal is to not just teach Helen to behave but to give her the gift of communication. Using sign language and signing the letters to spell words in Helen's open palm, Anne makes large strides toward improving Helen's behavior.

After two weeks of living alone with Helen in a small house on the Keller family plantation, Anne is still unable to reach a breakthrough with Helen when her mandated deadline is reached. During Helen's homecoming dinner, she begins to revert to her old ways of misbehavior. Anne takes Helen outside to the pump to refill a water pitcher she spilled during one of her tantrums, and the long-awaited breakthrough is made. Helen makes the connection that the words Anne has been spelling in her open palm are in reality the communicative representation of those things in the physical world around her. The word "water" is the wet fluid coming out of the water pump. With this connection the doorway for communication is opened to Helen, and she can now survive and thrive in the world through the eyes and ears of others.

== Cast ==
- Alison Elliott as Anne Sullivan
- Hallie Eisenberg (Note: credited as Hallie Kate Eisenberg) as Helen Keller
- Lucas Black as James Keller
- Kate Greenhouse as Kate Keller
- David Strathairn as Captain Keller
- Damir Andrei as Dr. Anagnos
- Stewart Arnott as Farm Boss
- Kevin Duhaney as Percy
- Neville Edwards as Henry
- Patricia Gage as Aunt Ev
- Eugene Lipinski as Proctor
- Twila Provencher as Young Annie
- Jackie Richardson as Viney

== See also ==
- Black (2005 film)
- List of films featuring the deaf and hard of hearing
