= The Miracle Worker (play) =

1957 three-act play by William Gibson

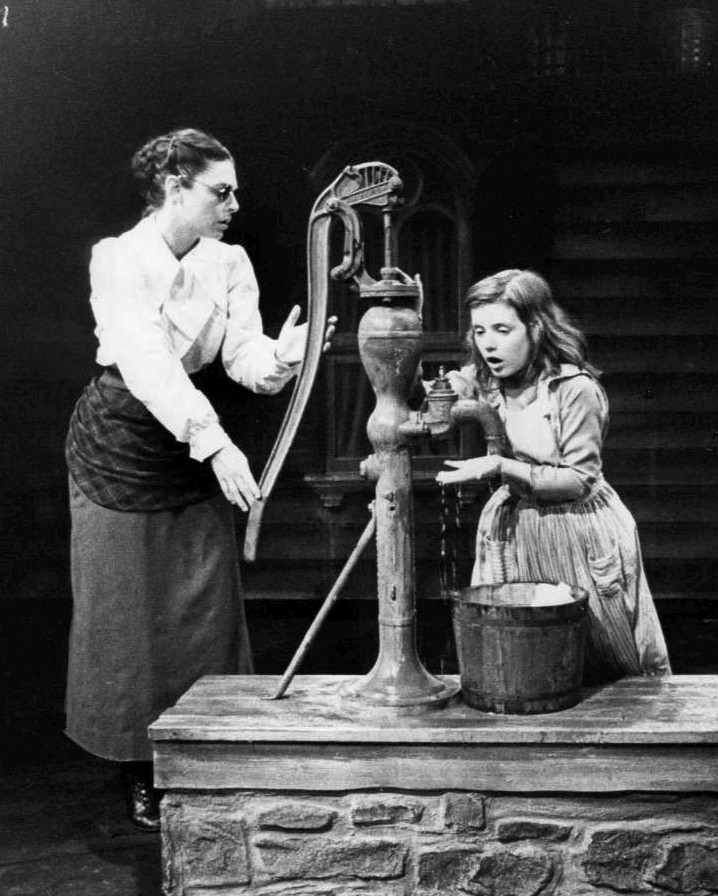
- Anne Bancroft and Patty Duke in The Miracle Worker, 1960; Both would reprise their roles in the 1962 film adaptation.
- Original language: English
- Written by: William Gibson
- Characters: Annie Sullivan; Helen Keller; Captain Arthur Keller; Kate Keller; James Keller; Aunt Ev (Evelyn); Anagnos; Viney
- Setting: Tuscumbia, Alabama

Premiere
- Date: October 19, 1959
- Place: Playhouse Theatre

The Miracle Worker is a three-act play by William Gibson adapted from his 1957 Playhouse 90 teleplay of the same name. It was based on Helen Keller's 1903 autobiography The Story of My Life.

The play's title was inspired by a Mark Twain quote: "Helen is a miracle, and Miss Sullivan is the miracle worker".

== Plot ==
In Tuscumbia, Alabama, an illness renders infant Helen Keller blind, deaf, and consequently mute (deaf-mute). Pitied and badly spoiled by her parents, Helen is taught no discipline and, by the age of six, grows into a wild, angry, tantrum-throwing child in control of the household. Desperate, the Kellers hire Annie Sullivan to serve as governess and teacher for their daughter. After several fierce battles with Helen, Annie convinces the Kellers that she needs two weeks alone with Helen in order to achieve any progress in the girl's education. In this time, Annie teaches Helen discipline through persistence and consistency, and language through hand signals, a double breakthrough that changes Helen's life and has a direct effect on the lives of everyone in the family.

== Characters ==
- Annie Sullivan, Helen's teacher
- Helen Keller, blind-deaf child
- Captain Arthur H. Keller, Helen's father
- Kate Keller, Helen's mother
- James Keller, Helen's half-brother
- Aunt Ev, Arthur's sister and Helen's aunt
- Michael Anagnos, director of the Perkins School for the Blind
- Viney, a servant in the Keller household
- Percy, Viney's son
- Martha, Viney's daughter
- Blind Girls
- Offstage Voices

== Productions ==
The play premiered on Broadway at the Playhouse Theatre on October 19, 1959, and closed on July 1, 1961, after 719 performances. The production was directed by Arthur Penn with scenic and lighting design by George Jenkins and costumes by Ruth Morley. The cast starred Anne Bancroft as Anne Sullivan and Patty Duke as Helen Keller. Featured in the cast were Torin Thatcher as Captain Keller, Patricia Neal as Kate Keller, Michael Constantine as Anagnos, and Beah Richards as Viney. Patty Duke stayed with the production until May 1961. Her understudy, Karen Lee, replaced her on May 11, 1961 and stayed with the production through its closing on July 1, 1961. Suzanne Pleshette replaced Anne Bancroft on February 6, 1961.

The play was produced in the West End in March 1961 with Anna Massey as Sullivan and Janina Faye as Keller. It transferred to Wyndham's Theatre in May. A revival was produced at Wyndham's Theatre on August 31, 1994, and closed on October 8. The production was directed by Richard Olivier and Bill Kenwright. The cast featured Catherine Holman as Keller, Jenny Seagrove as Sullivan, William Gaunt as Captain Keller, Judi Bowker as Kate Keller, and Michael Thornton as Anagnos.

In celebration of the 50th anniversary of the play, it was revived on Broadway at the Circle in the Square Theatre, opening on March 3, 2010. Directed by Kate Whoriskey, the cast starred Alison Pill as Sullivan and Abigail Breslin as Keller. The cast featured Matthew Modine as Captain Keller, Jennifer Morrison as Kate Keller, Tobias Segal as James Keller, and Elizabeth Franz as Aunt Ev. Despite critical praise, the revival failed to find an audience and closed on April 4 (after 21 previews and 38 regular performances), with the entire $2,600,000 capitalization in the project being lost.

In May 2011, Duke continued her career-long involvement with the play by directing a production of it at Interplayers Theatre in Spokane, Washington.

Ivy Green, Helen Keller's childhood home, hosts an annual outdoor production which is Alabama's official outdoor drama.

== Critical response ==
Time called the original production "a story that, however well known, acquires stunning new reality and affectingness on the stage. The overwhelming force of the play's crucial scenes could not have derived from the stirring facts alone, nor from playwright Gibson's vivid use of them. What proves decisive is the extraordinary performances, the magnificent teamwork of Anne Bancroft and ten-year-old Patty Duke, and the brilliant direction of Arthur Penn". While noting some of the play's flaws, particularly in the areas of "some knotty Keller family relationships and some eerie Sullivan family memories", which it characterized as "fairly makeshift, at times clumsy, and, when sound-tracking voices from the past, occasionally embarrassing", it praised the scenes that "in the hands of two remarkable actresses, constitute unforgettable theater".

The New York Times in its review titled "Giver of Light" also praised the "glorious performance" of Anne Bancroft and Patty Duke's "wonderfully truthful and touching" performance as Helen, along with those of Patricia Neal and Torin Thatcher as Helen's parents. While finding similar flaws in the narrative structure of the play, it praised the play as "profoundly moving" and noted that any of its failings did not "destroy the emotional power of the essential struggle in the drama".

== Screen adaptations ==
Gibson, Penn, Bancroft, and Duke reunited for a 1962 film adaptation which was highly acclaimed. Gibson was nominated for the Academy Award for Best Adapted Screenplay, Penn was nominated as Best Director, and both Bancroft (portraying Sullivan) and Duke (portraying Keller) won the Academy Award for Best Actress and Best Supporting Actress, respectively. The play has been adapted for TV twice, first in 1979 with Duke as Sullivan and Melissa Gilbert as Helen and in 2000 with Alison Elliott as Sullivan and Hallie Kate Eisenberg as Helen. It's been adapted for Italian (RAI 1968) and Spanish (TVE, 1978).

== Awards and nominations ==
=== Original Broadway production ===
Year	Award	Category	Nominee	Result
1960	Tony Awards	Best Play	William Gibson	Won
1960	Tony Awards	Best Actress in a Play	Anne Bancroft	Won
1960	Tony Awards	Best Direction of a Play	Arthur Penn	Won
1960	Tony Awards	Best Scenic Design	George C. Jenkins	Nominated
1960	Tony Awards	Best Stage Technician	John Walters	Won
1960	Theatre World Award		Patty Duke	Won
