= Helen Keller =

American deafblind author and activist (1880–1968)

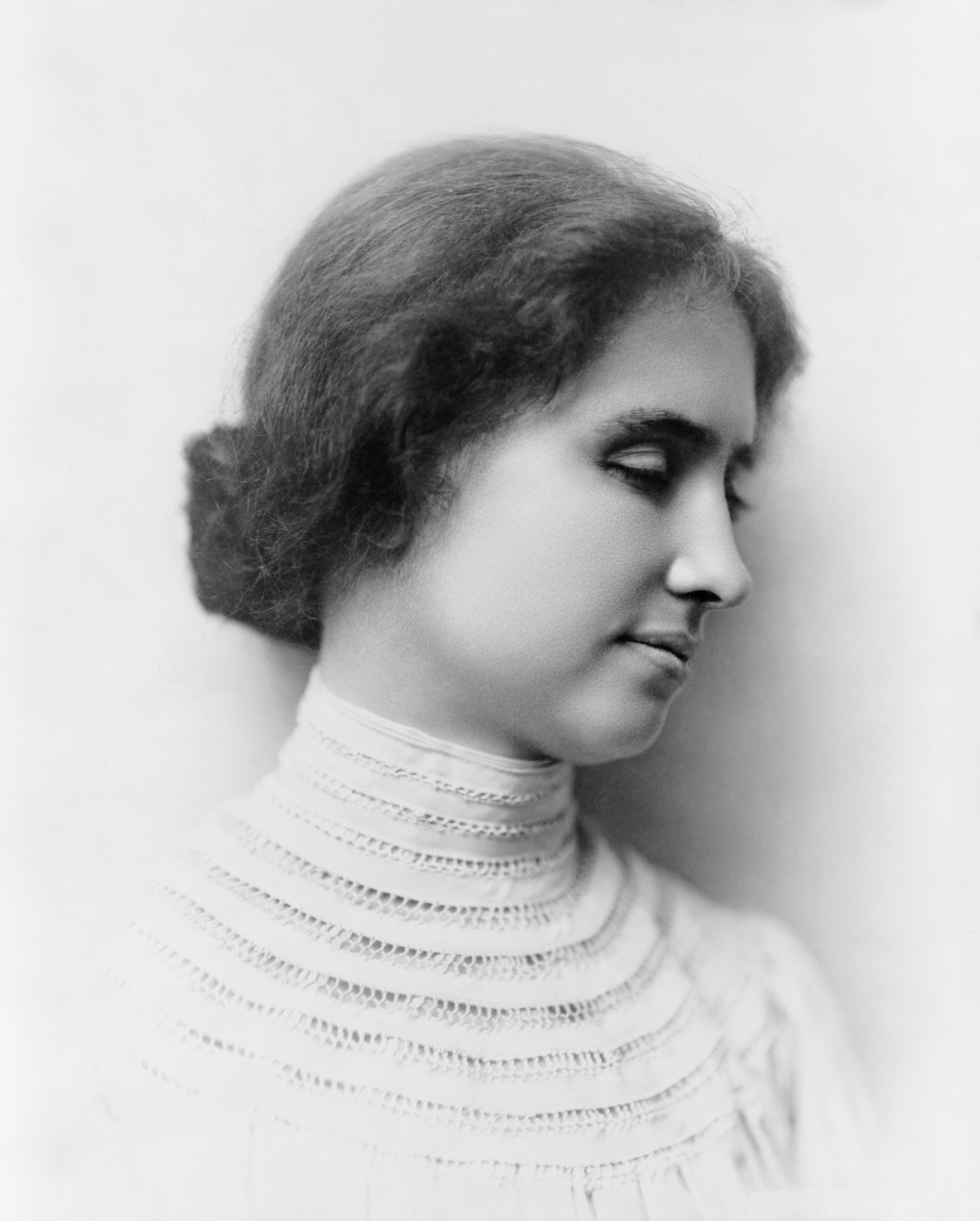
- Keller, c. 1904
- Born: Helen Adams Keller; June 27, 1880; Tuscumbia, Alabama, U.S.
- Died: June 1, 1968 (aged 87); Easton, Connecticut, U.S.
- Resting place: Washington National Cathedral
- Education: Radcliffe College (BA)
- Occupations: Author; political activist; lecturer
- Relatives: Charles W. Adams (maternal grandfather); Arthur H. Keller (father)
- Writing career
- Notable work: The Story of My Life (1903)

Helen Adams Keller (June 27, 1880 – June 1, 1968) was an American deafblind author, disability rights advocate, political activist and lecturer.

Born in West Tuscumbia, Alabama, she lost her sight and her hearing after a bout of illness when she was 19 months old. She then communicated primarily using home signs until the age of seven, when she met her first teacher and life-long companion Anne Sullivan. Sullivan taught Keller language, including reading and writing. After an education at both specialist and mainstream schools, Keller attended Radcliffe College of Harvard University and became the first deafblind person in the United States to earn a college diploma.

Keller was also a prolific author, writing 14 books and hundreds of speeches and essays on topics ranging from animals to Mahatma Gandhi. Keller campaigned for those with disabilities and for women's suffrage, labor rights, and world peace. In 1909, she joined the Socialist Party of America (SPA). She was a founding member of the American Civil Liberties Union (ACLU).

Keller's autobiography, The Story of My Life (1903), publicized her education and life with Sullivan. The playwright William Gibson wrote a theatrical adaptation, The Miracle Worker, in 1959, which he adapted as a film under the same title in 1962. Her birthplace has been designated and preserved as a National Historic Landmark. Since 1954, it has been operated as a house museum and sponsors an annual "Helen Keller Day".

== Early childhood and illness ==
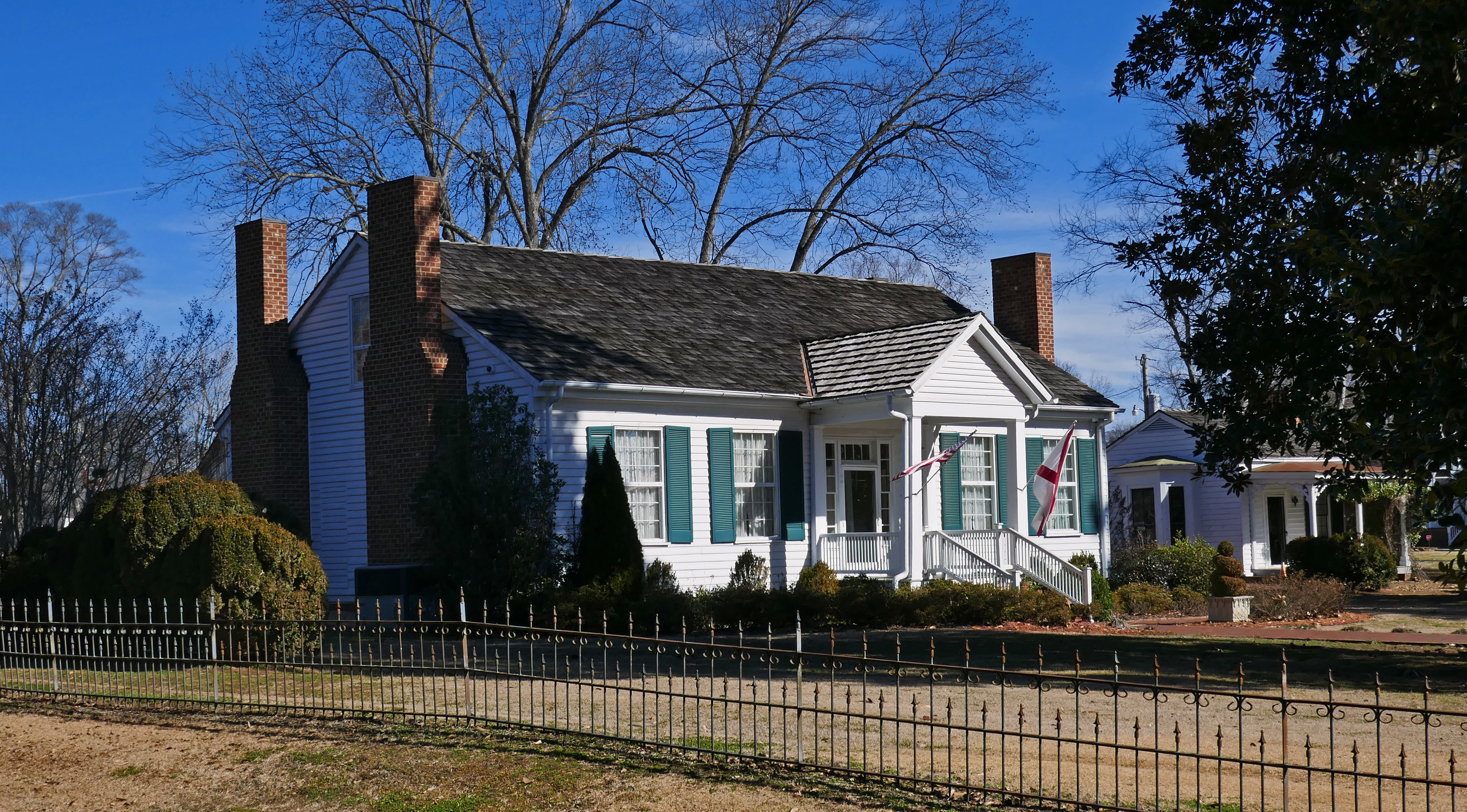
Keller's birthplace in Tuscumbia, Alabama

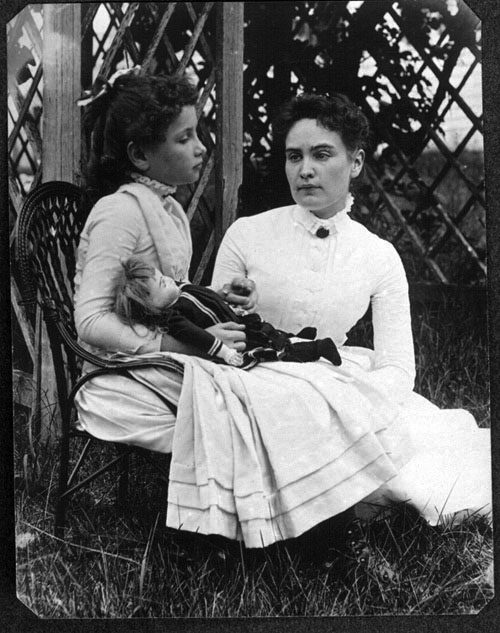
Keller (left) with Anne Sullivan vacationing on Cape Cod in July 1888

Keller was born Helen Adams Keller on June 27, 1880, in Tuscumbia, Alabama, the daughter of Arthur Henley Keller (1836–1896), and Catherine Everett (née Adams) Keller (1856–1921), known as "Kate". The Keller family lived on a homestead, Ivy Green, which her paternal grandfather had built decades earlier. She had four siblings: two full siblings, Mildred Campbell (née Keller) Tyson and Phillip Brooks Keller; and two older half-brothers from her father's first marriage, James McDonald Keller and William Simpson Keller.

Keller's father worked for many years as an editor of the Tuscumbia North Alabamian. He had served as a captain in the Confederate Army. The family was part of the slaveholding elite before the American Civil War, but lost status later. Her mother was the daughter of Charles W. Adams, a Confederate general. Keller's paternal lineage was traced to Casper Keller, a native of Switzerland. One of Helen's Swiss ancestors was the first teacher for the deaf in Zürich. Keller reflected on this fact in her first autobiography, asserting that "there is no king who has not had a slave among his ancestors, and no slave who has not had a king among his".

At 19 months old, Keller contracted an unknown illness described by doctors as "an acute congestion of the stomach and the brain". Contemporary doctors believe it may have been meningitis, caused by the bacterium Neisseria meningitidis (meningococcus), by rubella, scarlet fever, or by Haemophilus influenzae, which can cause the same symptoms but is less likely because of its 97% juvenile mortality rate at that time.

Keller was able to recover from her illness, but was left permanently blind and deaf, as she recalled in her autobiography, "at sea in a dense fog". At that time, Keller was able to communicate somewhat with Martha Washington, who was two years older and the daughter of the family cook, and understood the girl's signs;by the age of seven, Keller had more than 60 home signs to communicate with her family, and could distinguish people by the vibration of their footsteps. In 1886, Keller's mother, inspired by an account in Charles Dickens' American Notes of the successful education of Laura Bridgman, a deaf and blind woman, dispatched the young Keller and her father to consult physician J. Julian Chisholm, an eye, ear, nose and throat specialist in Baltimore, for advice. Chisholm referred the Kellers to Alexander Graham Bell, who was working with deaf children at the time. Bell advised them to contact the Perkins Institute for the Blind, the school where Bridgman had been educated. It was then located in South Boston. Michael Anagnos, the school's director, asked Anne Sullivan, a 20-year-old alumna of the school who was visually impaired, to become Keller's instructor. It was the beginning of a nearly 50-year-long relationship Sullivan developed with Keller as her governess and later her companion.

Sullivan arrived at Keller's house on March 5, 1887, a day Keller would forever remember as "my soul's birthday". Sullivan immediately began to teach Helen to communicate by spelling words into her hand, beginning with "d-o-l-l" for the doll that she had brought Keller as a present. Keller initially struggled with lessons since she could not comprehend that every object had a word identifying it. When Sullivan was trying to teach Keller the word for "mug", Keller became so frustrated she broke the mug. Keller remembered how she soon began imitating Sullivan's hand gestures: "I did not know that I was spelling a word or even that words existed. I was simply making my fingers go in monkey-like imitation."

The next month, Keller made a breakthrough, when she realized that the motions her teacher was making on the palm of her hand, while running cool water over her other hand, symbolized the idea of "water". Writing in her autobiography, The Story of My Life, Keller recalled the moment:

I stood still, my whole attention fixed upon the motions of her fingers. Suddenly I felt a misty consciousness as of something forgotten—a thrill of returning thought; and somehow the mystery of language was revealed to me. I knew then that w-a-t-e-r meant the wonderful cool something that was flowing over my hand. The living word awakened my soul, gave it light, hope, set it free!

Keller quickly demanded that Sullivan sign the names of all the other familiar objects in her world.

== Formal education ==
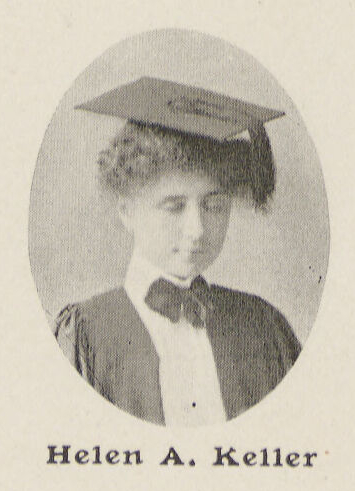
Keller in the Radcliffe College yearbook, 1904

In May 1888, Keller started attending the Perkins Institute for the Blind. In 1893, Keller, along with Sullivan, attended William Wade House and Finishing School. In 1894, Keller and Sullivan moved to New York to attend the Wright-Humason School for the Deaf, and to learn from Sarah Fuller at the Horace Mann School for the Deaf. In 1896, they returned to Massachusetts, and Keller entered The Cambridge School for Young Ladies before gaining admittance, in 1900, to Radcliffe College of Harvard University, where she lived in Briggs Hall, South House. Her admirer, Mark Twain, had introduced her to Standard Oil magnate Henry Huttleston Rogers, who, with his wife Abbie, paid for her education. In 1904, at the age of 24, Keller graduated from Radcliffe as a member of Phi Beta Kappa, becoming the first deafblind person to earn a Bachelor of Arts degree. She maintained a correspondence with the Austrian pedagogue and philosopher Wilhelm Jerusalem, who was one of the first to discover her literary talent.

Determined to communicate with others as conventionally as possible, Keller learned to speak and spent much of her life giving speeches and lectures on aspects of her life. She learned to "hear" people's speech using the Tadoma method, which means using her fingers to feel the lips and throat of the speaker. She became proficient at using braille, and also used fingerspelling to communicate. Shortly before World War I, with the assistance of the Zoellner Quartet, she determined that by placing her fingertips on a resonant tabletop she could experience music played close by.

== Companions ==
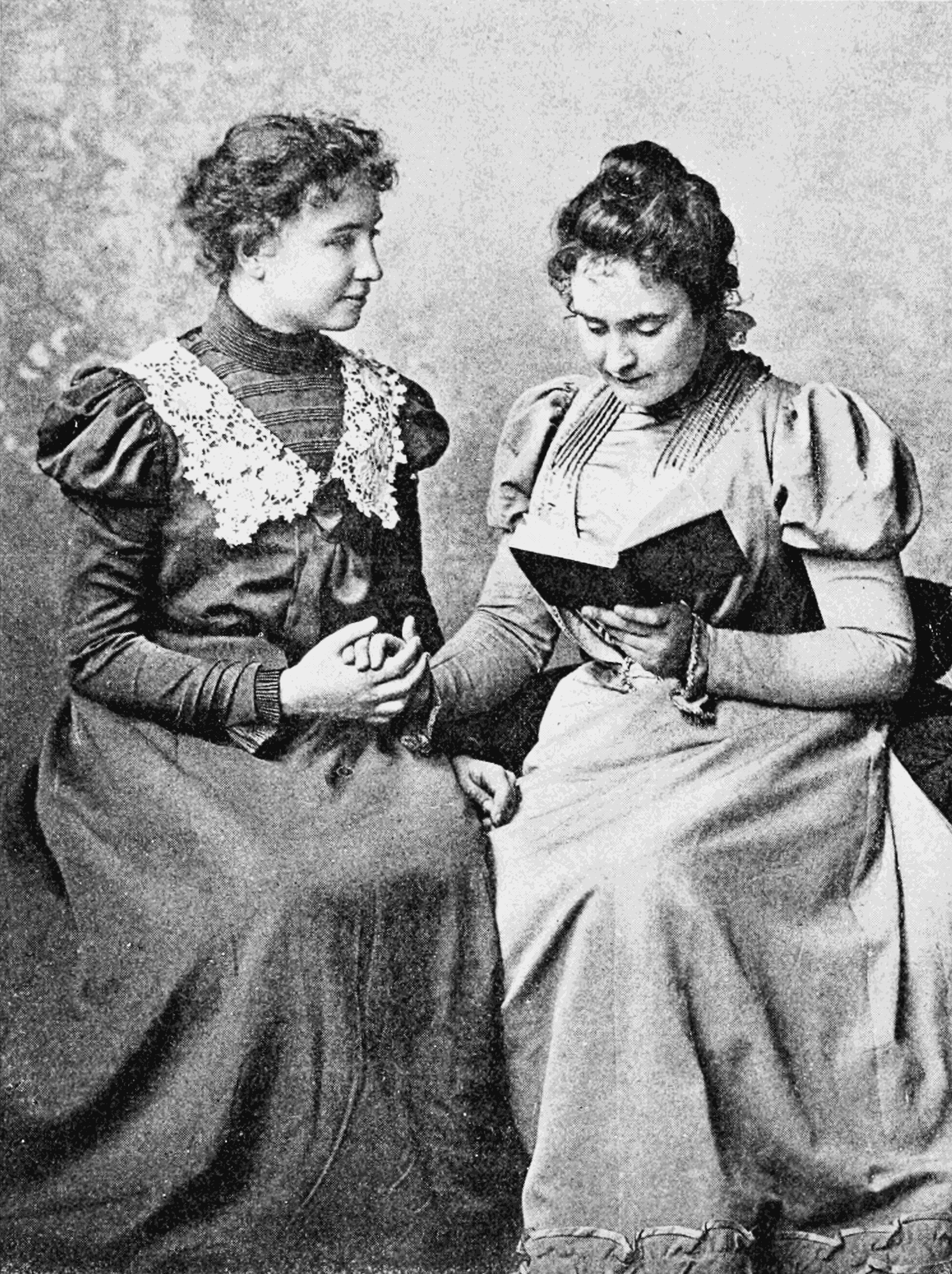
Helen Keller in 1899 with lifelong companion and teacher Anne Sullivan. Photo taken by Alexander Graham Bell at his School of Vocal Physiology and Mechanics of Speech.

Anne Sullivan stayed as a companion to Keller long after she taught her. Sullivan married John Macy in 1905, and her health started failing around 1914. Polly Thomson (February 20, 1885 – March 21, 1960) was hired to keep house. She was a young woman from Scotland who had no experience with deaf or blind people. She progressed to working as a secretary as well, and eventually became a constant companion to Keller. Sullivan's teaching methods, based on tactile fingerspelling, objects and direct experience, became an influential example in the history of education for people with deafblindness.

Keller moved to Forest Hills, Queens, together with Sullivan and Macy, and used the house as a base for her efforts on behalf of the American Foundation for the Blind. While in her 30s, Keller had a love affair and became secretly engaged; she also defied her teacher and family by attempting an elopement with the man she loved, Peter Fagan, who was known as "the fingerspelling socialist", was a young Boston Herald reporter sent to Keller's home to act as her private secretary when Sullivan fell ill. At the time, her father had died and Sullivan was recovering in Lake Placid and Puerto Rico. Keller had moved with her mother to Montgomery, Alabama.

Sullivan died in 1936, with Keller holding her hand, after falling into a coma as a result of coronary thrombosis. Keller and Thomson moved to Connecticut. They traveled worldwide and raised funds for the blind. Thomson had a stroke in 1957 from which she never fully recovered and died in 1960. Winnie Corbally, a nurse originally hired to care for Thomson in 1957, stayed on after Thomson's death and was Keller's companion for the rest of her life.

== Akita dogs ==
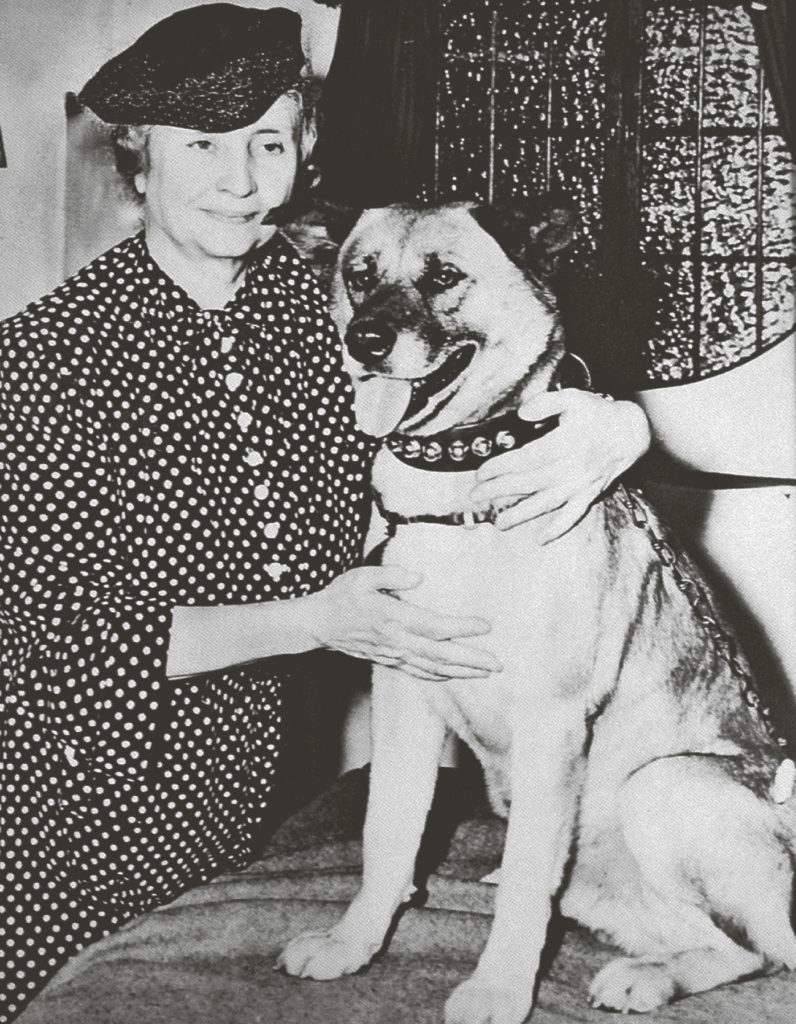
Keller with her second Akita Kenzan-Go

Keller was very fond of Akita dogs. She visited Akita Prefecture in June 1937 and asked about Hachikō, a loyal dog who searched for his deceased master for about 10 years. She began keeping Akitas as pets and introduced them to America. In 1948, she touched the re-made statue of Hachikō at Shibuya Station. The first Akita given to her was Kamikaze-Go, who was the first Akita to travel overseas from Japan and the first Akita in America. He died of an infection two months after arriving in America and Keller was given Kamikaze-Go's brother, Kenzan-Go. Keller nicknamed the dog Go-Go and they were great companions from day one. Go-Go even spent his first night at Keller's home sleeping at the foot of her bed.

== Career, writing and political activities ==
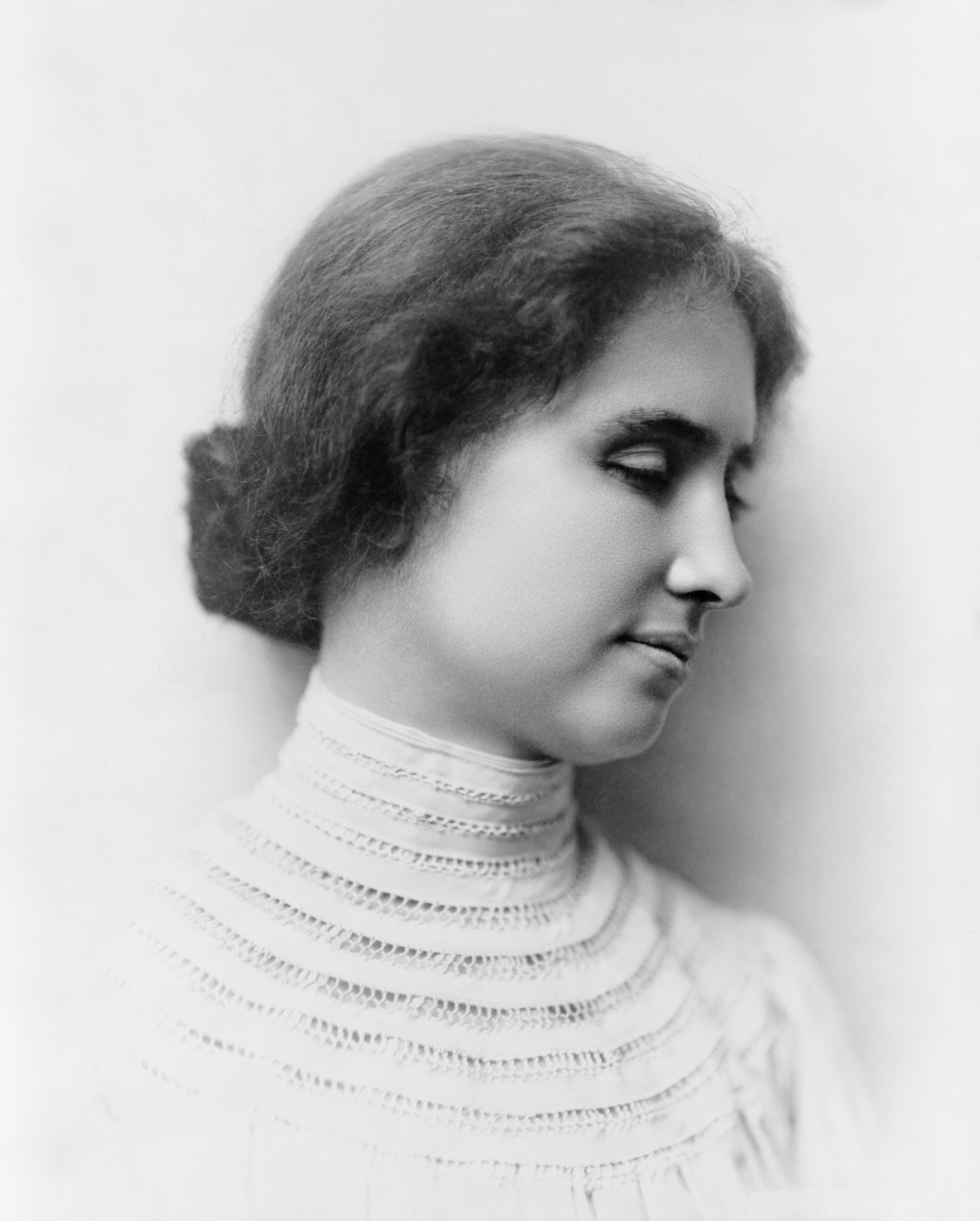
1904 portrait. Due to a protruding left eye, Keller was usually photographed in profile until she had her eyes replaced, c. 1911, with glass replicas for "medical and cosmetic reasons".

The few own the many because they possess the means of livelihood of all ... The country is governed for the richest, for the corporations, the bankers, the land speculators, and for the exploiters of labor. The majority of mankind are working people. So long as their fair demands—the ownership and control of their livelihoods—are set at naught, we can have neither men's rights nor women's rights. The majority of mankind is ground down by industrial oppression in order that the small remnant may live in ease.

— Helen Keller, 1911

On January 22, 1916, Keller and Sullivan traveled to the small town of Menomonie in western Wisconsin to deliver a lecture at the Mabel Tainter Memorial Building. Details of her talk were provided in the weekly Dunn County News on January 22, 1916:

A message of optimism, of hope, of good cheer, and of loving service was brought to Menomonie Saturday—a message that will linger long with those fortunate enough to have received it. This message came with the visit of Helen Keller and her teacher, Mrs. John Macy, and both had a hand in imparting it Saturday evening to a splendid audience that filled The Memorial. The wonderful girl who has so brilliantly triumphed over the triple afflictions of blindness, dumbness and deafness, gave a talk with her own lips on "Happiness", and it will be remembered always as a piece of inspired teaching by those who heard it.

Keller became a world-famous speaker and author. She was an advocate for people with disabilities, amid numerous other causes. She traveled to twenty-five different countries giving motivational speeches about deaf people's conditions. She was a suffragist, pacifist, Christian socialist, birth control supporter, and opponent of Woodrow Wilson. In 1915, she and George A. Kessler founded the Helen Keller International (HKI) organization. This organization is devoted to research in vision, health, and nutrition. In 1916, she sent money to the NAACP, as she was ashamed of the Southern un-Christian treatment of "colored people".

In 1920, Keller helped to found the American Civil Liberties Union (ACLU). She traveled to over 40 countries with Sullivan, making several trips to Japan and becoming a favorite of the Japanese people. Keller met every U.S. president from Grover Cleveland to Lyndon B. Johnson and was friends with many famous figures, including Alexander Graham Bell, Charlie Chaplin, and Mark Twain. Keller and Twain were both considered political radicals allied with leftist politics.

Keller, who believed that the poor were "ground down by industrial oppression", wanted children born into poor families to have the same opportunities to succeed that she had enjoyed. She wrote, "I owed my success partly to the advantages of my birth and environment. I have learned that the power to rise is not within the reach of everyone."

In 1909, Keller became a member of the Socialist Party of America (SPA); she actively campaigned and wrote in support of the working class from 1909 to 1921. Many of her speeches and writings were about women's right to vote and the effects of war; in addition, she supported causes that opposed military intervention. She had speech therapy to have her voice understood better by the public. When the Rockefeller-owned press refused to print her articles, she protested until her work was finally published.

Keller supported the SPA candidate Eugene V. Debs in each of his campaigns for the presidency. Before reading Progress and Poverty by Henry George, she was already a socialist who believed that Georgism was a good step in the right direction. She later wrote of finding "in Henry George's philosophy a rare beauty and power of inspiration, and a splendid faith in the essential nobility of human nature". Keller stated that newspaper columnists who had praised her courage and intelligence before she expressed her socialist views now called attention to her disabilities. The editor of the Brooklyn Eagle wrote that her "mistakes sprung out of the manifest limitations of her development". Keller responded to that editor, referring to having met him before he knew of her political views:

At that time the compliments he paid me were so generous that I blush to remember them. But now that I have come out for socialism he reminds me and the public that I am blind and deaf and especially liable to error. I must have shrunk in intelligence during the years since I met him. ... Oh, ridiculous Brooklyn Eagle! Socially blind and deaf, it defends an intolerable system, a system that is the cause of much of the physical blindness and deafness which we are trying to prevent.

In 1912, Keller joined the Industrial Workers of the World (the IWW, known as the Wobblies), saying that parliamentary socialism was "sinking in the political bog". She wrote for the IWW between 1916 and 1918. In Why I Became an IWW, Keller explained that her motivation for activism came in part from her concern about blindness and other disabilities:

I was appointed on a commission to investigate the conditions of the blind. For the first time I, who had thought blindness a misfortune beyond human control, found that too much of it was traceable to wrong industrial conditions, often caused by the selfishness and greed of employers. And the social evil contributed its share. I found that poverty drove women to a life of shame that ended in blindness.

The last sentence refers to prostitution and syphilis, the former a "life of shame" that women used to support themselves, which contributed to their contracting syphilis. Untreated, it was a leading cause of blindness. In the same interview, Keller also cited the 1912 strike of textile workers in Lawrence, Massachusetts, for instigating her support of socialism. As a result of her advocacy, she was placed on the FBI's watchlist; the FBI wrote on July 1, 1953, that although they have not "conducted an investigation with regard to Helen Adams Keller", their files of Keller "reflect the following pertinent information concerning this individual".

Keller supported eugenics, which had become popular with both new understandings and misapprehensions of principles of biological inheritance. In 1915, she wrote in favor of refusing life-saving medical procedures to infants with severe mental impairments or physical deformities, saying that their lives were not worthwhile and they would likely become criminals. From 1946 to 1957, Keller visited 35 countries. In 1948, she went to New Zealand and visited deaf schools in Christchurch and Auckland. She met Deaf Society of Canterbury Life Member Patty Still in Christchurch.

== Works ==
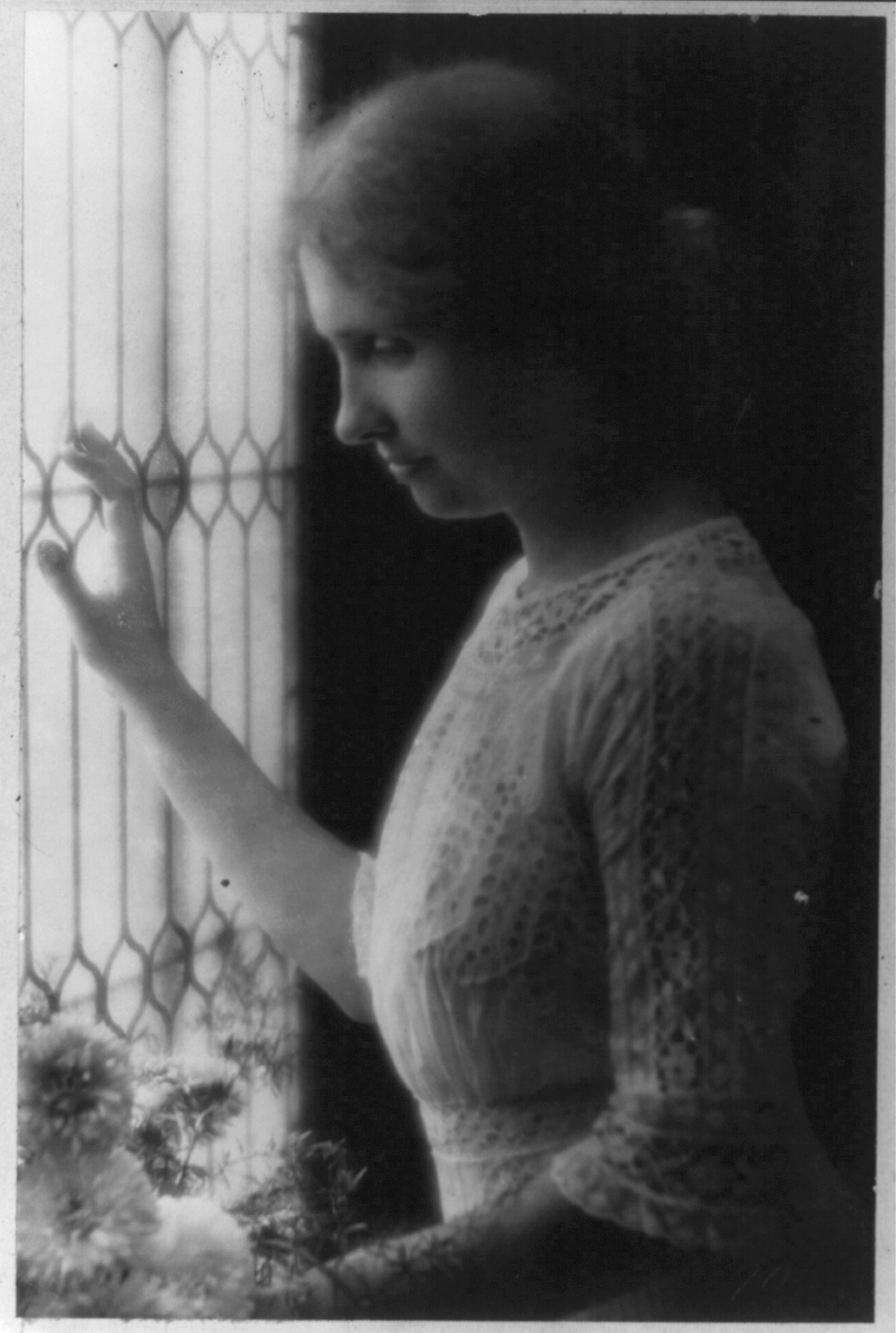
Keller, c. November 1912

Keller wrote a total of 12 published books and several articles. One of her earliest pieces of writing, at age 11, was The Frost King (1891). There were allegations that this story had been plagiarized from The Frost Fairies by Margaret Canby. An investigation into the matter revealed that the allegations were correct. However, it was felt by the Perkins schoolmaster Michael Anagnos that Keller may have experienced a case of cryptomnesia, which was that she had Canby's story read to her but forgot about it, while the memory remained in her subconscious.

At age 22, with help from Sullivan and Sullivan's husband John Macy, Keller published her autobiography, The Story of My Life (1903). It recounts the story of her life up to age 21 and was written during her time in college. In an article Keller wrote in 1907, she brought to public attention the fact that many cases of childhood blindness could be prevented by washing the eyes of every newborn baby with a disinfectant solution. At the time, only a fraction of doctors and midwives were doing this. Thanks to Keller's advocacy, this commonsense public health measure was swiftly and widely adopted.

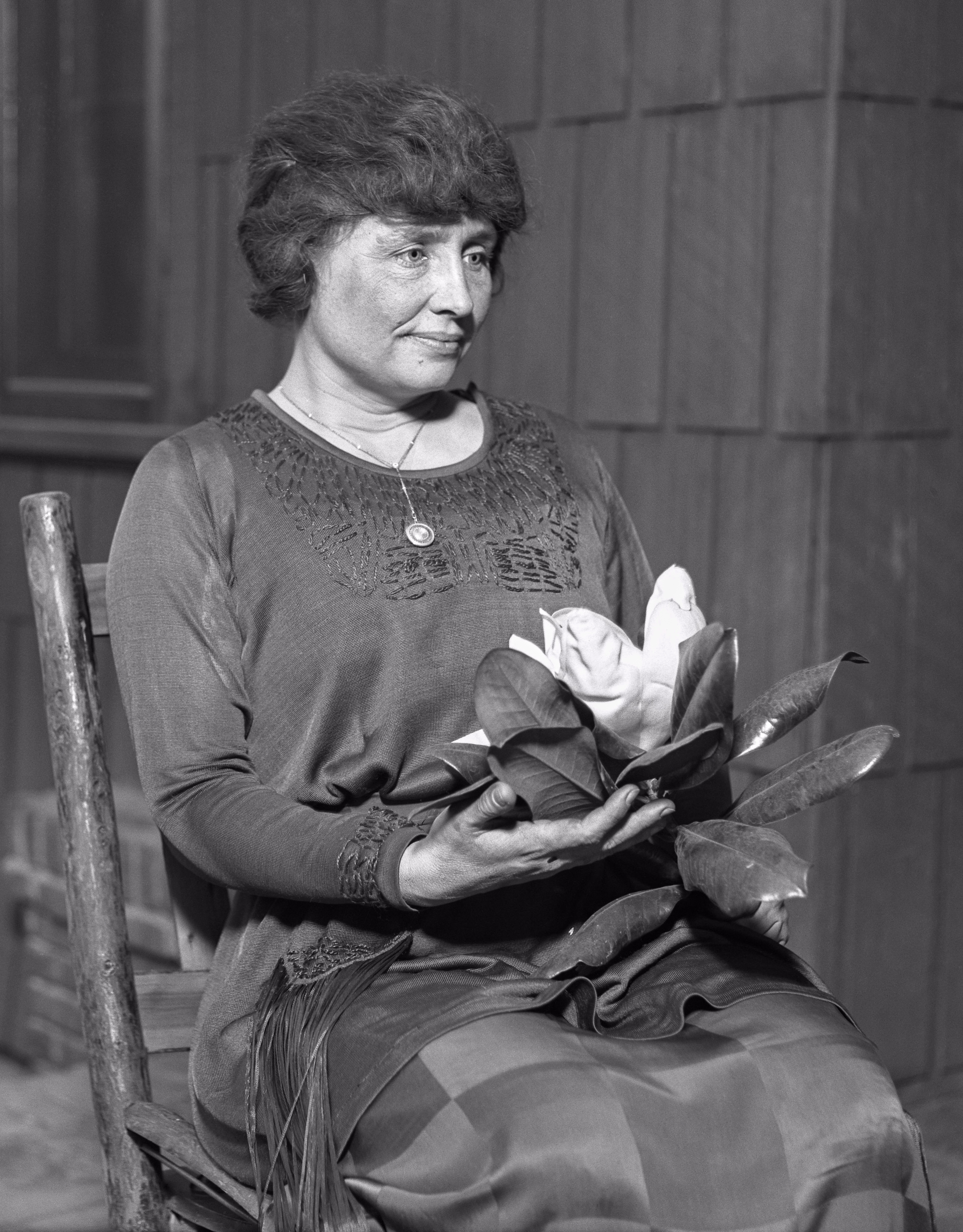
Keller holding a magnolia, c. 1920

In 1908, Keller wrote The World I Live In, giving readers an insight into how she felt about the world. Out of the Dark, a series of essays on socialism, was published in 1913.

Keller, along with her friend Mark Twain, also became involved in the dispute about the authorship of the Shakespeare plays, which they discussed extensively during Keller's, Sullivan's and Macy's visit to Twain's home in 1909. In a review Keller published of George Greenwood's book The Shakespeare Problem Restated, she wrote that "Shakespeare of Stratford is not to be even thought of as a possible author of the most wonderful plays in the world." She soon became convinced by the claims of William Stone Booth that the works' true author was Francis Bacon and that Bacon had hidden an acrostic in every one of the plays contained in the First Folio. She asked Richard Watson Gilder, the editor of The Century Magazine, if he'd be willing to publish an article by her advocating for Booth's hypothesis, but he declined.

When Keller was young, Anne Sullivan introduced her to Phillips Brooks, who introduced her to Christianity, Keller famously saying: "I always knew He was there, but I didn't know His name!" Her spiritual autobiography, My Religion, was published in 1927 and then in 1994 extensively revised by Ray Silverman, and re-issued under the title Light in My Darkness. It advocates the teachings of Emanuel Swedenborg, the Christian theologian and mystic who gave a spiritual interpretation of the teachings of the Bible and who claimed that the Second Coming of Jesus Christ had already taken place. Keller described the core of her belief in these words:

But in Swedenborg's teaching it [Divine Providence] is shown to be the government of God's Love and Wisdom and the creation of uses. Since His Life cannot be less in one being than another, or His Love manifested less fully in one thing than another, His Providence must needs be universal ... He has provided religion of some kind everywhere, and it does not matter to what race or creed anyone belongs if he is faithful to his ideals of right living.

- "The Frost King" (1891)
- The Story of My Life (1903)
- Optimism: an essay (1903) T. Y. Crowell and company
- My Key of Life: Optimism (1904), Isbister
- The World I Live In (1908)
- The miracle of life (1909) Hodder and Stoughton
- The song of the stone wall (1910) The Century co.
- Out of the Dark, a series of essays on socialism (1913)
- Uncle Sam Is Calling (set to music by Pauline B. Story) (1917)
- My Religion (1927; also called Light in My Darkness)
- Midstream: my later life (1929) Doubleday, Doran & company
- We bereaved.(1929) L. Fulenwider, Inc
- Peace at eventide (1932) Methuen & co. ltd
- Helen Keller in Scotland: a personal record written by herself (1933) Methuen, 212pp
- Helen Keller's journal (1938) M. Joseph, 296pp
- Let us have faith (1940), Doubleday, & Doran & co., inc.
- Teacher: Anne Sullivan Macy: a tribute by the foster-child of her mind. (1955), Doubleday (publisher)
- The open door (1957), Doubleday, 140pp
- The faith of Helen Keller (1967)
- Helen Keller: her socialist years, writings and speeches (1967)

=== Archival material ===
The Helen Keller Archives in New York are owned by the American Foundation for the Blind. The archive is currently housed at the Museum of the American Printing House for the Blind on a long-term loan. Archival material of Keller stored in New York at the offices of Helen Keller International was lost when the Twin Towers were destroyed in the September 11 attacks. The material lost included first editions of her books, correspondence with the director of the Royal National Institute of Blind People, and photographs. There is also some archival material at Perkins School for the Blind.

== Later life and death ==
Keller had a series of strokes in 1961 and spent the last years of her life at her home. In 1964, she was made an honorary member of the Southern Dames of America during their second national assembly in Washington, D.C. On September 14, 1964, President Lyndon B. Johnson awarded her the Presidential Medal of Freedom, one of the United States' two highest civilian honors. In 1965, she was elected to the National Women's Hall of Fame at the New York World's Fair. Keller devoted much of her later life to raising funds for the American Foundation for the Blind. She died in her sleep on June 1, 1968, at her home, Arcan Ridge, located in Easton, Connecticut, at the age of 87. A service was held at the Washington National Cathedral in Washington, D.C., and her body was cremated in Bridgeport, Connecticut. Her ashes were buried at the Washington National Cathedral next to her constant companions, Anne Sullivan and Polly Thomson.

== Portrayals ==
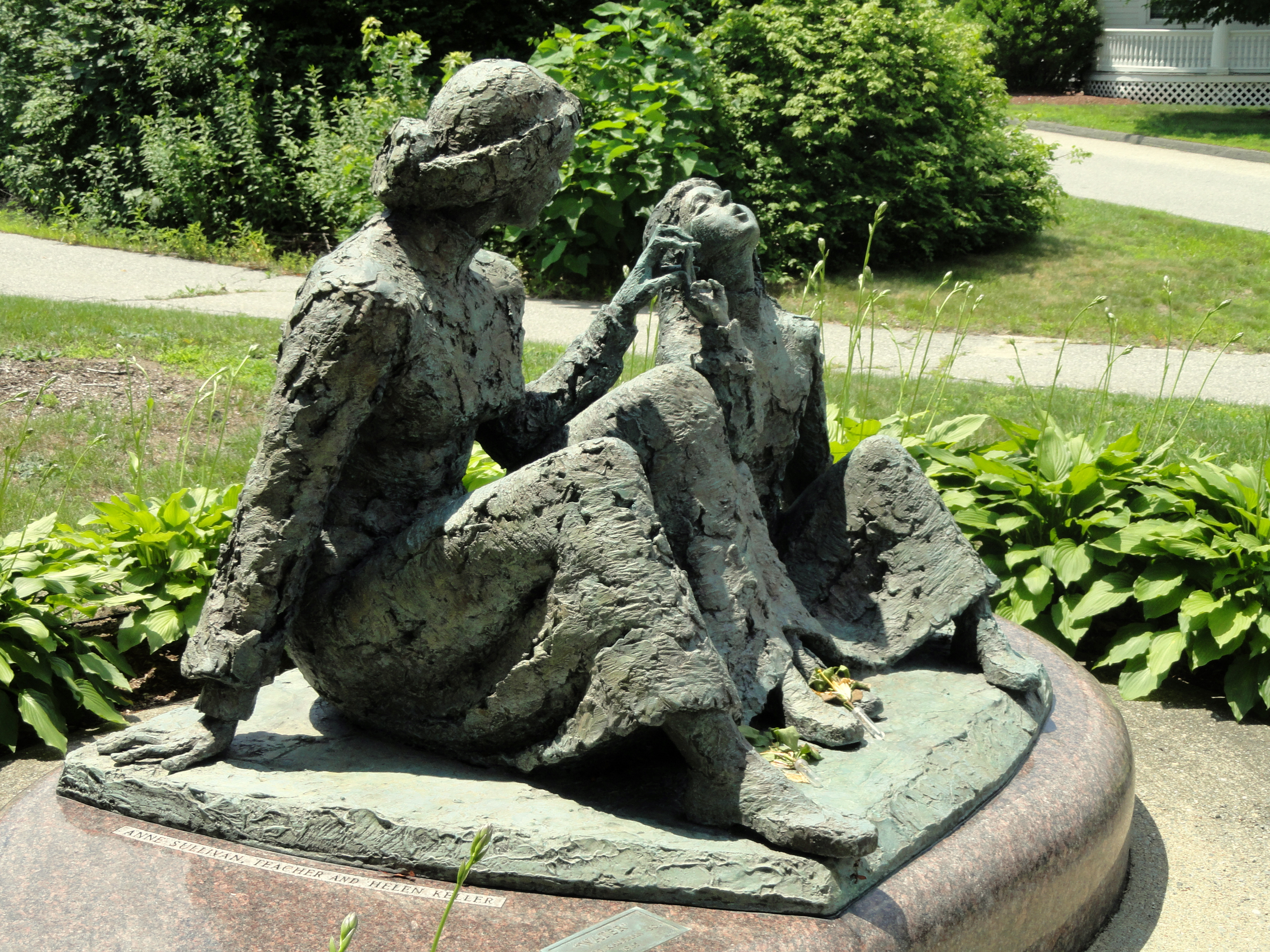
Anne Sullivan – Helen Keller Memorial, bronze sculpture in Tewksbury, Massachusetts

Keller's life has been interpreted many times. She and her companion Anne Sullivan appeared in a silent film, Deliverance (1919), which told her story in a melodramatic, allegorical style. She was also the subject of the Academy Award-winning 1954 documentary Helen Keller in Her Story, narrated by her friend and noted theatrical actress Katharine Cornell; in 2023, the film was added to the National Film Registry by the Library of Congress for being deemed "culturally, historically, or aesthetically significant". She was also profiled in The Story of Helen Keller, part of the Famous Americans series produced by Hearst Entertainment. In the 1950s, when she was considered by many worldwide the greatest woman alive, Hearst reporter Adela Rogers St. Johns told friends that she did not plan to include Keller in the book she was writing about the most famous women of the United States.

The Miracle Worker is a literature cycle of dramatic works ultimately derived from her autobiography, The Story of My Life. The various dramas each describe the relationship between Keller and Sullivan, depicting how the teacher led her from a state of almost feral wildness into education, activism, and intellectual celebrity. The common title of the cycle echoes Mark Twain's description of Sullivan as a "miracle worker". Its first realization, starring Patty McCormack as Keller and Teresa Wright as Sullivan, was the 1957 Playhouse 90 teleplay of that title by William Gibson. When Keller heard about it, she was enthusiastic, saying: "Never did I dream a drama could be devised out of the story of my life." Within the cultural context of the early civil rights movement, Gibson adapted it for a Broadway production in 1959, which was praised by critics as a contemporary classic, and an Oscar-winning feature film in 1962, starring Anne Bancroft and Patty Duke. It was remade for television in 1979, and then again in 2000.

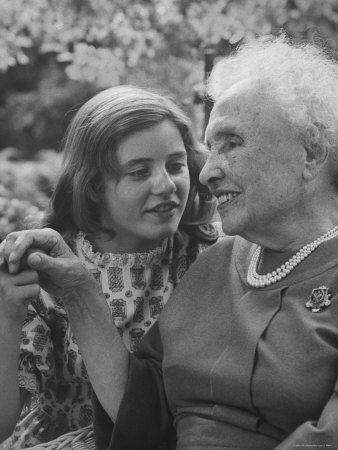
Helen Keller with Patty Duke, who portrayed Keller in both the play and film The Miracle Worker (1962). In a 1979 remake, Patty Duke played Anne Sullivan.

An anime movie called The Story of Helen Keller: Angel of Love and Light was made in 1981. In 1984, Keller's life story was made into a TV movie called The Miracle Continues. This film, a semi-sequel to The Miracle Worker, recounts her college years and her early adult life. None of the early movies hint at the social activism that would become the hallmark of Keller's later life, although a Disney version produced in 2000 states in the credits that she became an activist for social equality. The Bollywood movie Black (2005) was largely based on Keller's story from her childhood to her graduation.

A documentary called Shining Soul: Helen Keller's Spiritual Life and Legacy was produced by the Swedenborg Foundation in 2005. The film focuses on the role played by Emanuel Swedenborg's spiritual theology in her life and how it inspired Keller's triumph over her triple disabilities of blindness, deafness, and a severe speech impediment. On March 6, 2008, the New England Historic Genealogical Society announced that a staff member had discovered a rare 1888 photograph showing Helen and Anne, which, although previously published, had escaped widespread attention. Depicting Helen holding one of her many dolls, it is believed to be the earliest surviving photograph of Keller with Anne Sullivan Macy. Video footage showing Keller speaking also exists.

A biography of Keller was written by the German Jewish author H. J. Kaeser.

In 2020, the documentary essay Her Socialist Smile by John Gianvito evolves around Keller's first public talk in 1913 before a general audience, when she started speaking out on behalf of progressive causes.

== Legacy and posthumous honors ==
In 1999, Keller was listed fifth (at 30 percent) in Gallup's List of Most Widely Admired People of the 20th Century. That same year, Keller was also named one of Time magazine's 100 Most Important People of the 20th Century. In 2003, Alabama honored its native daughter on its state quarter. The Alabama state quarter is the only circulating U.S. coin to feature braille. The Helen Keller Hospital in Sheffield, Alabama, is dedicated to her. Streets are named after Keller in Zurich, Switzerland; in Alabama and New York in the United States; in Getafe, Spain; in Vienna, Austria; in Lod, Israel; in Lisbon, Portugal; in Caen, France; and in São Paulo, Brazil. A preschool for the deaf and hard of hearing in Mysore, India, was originally named after Keller by its founder, K. K. Srinivasan. In 1973, Keller was inducted into the National Women's Hall of Fame.

A commemorative stamp was issued in 1980 (pictured) by the United States Postal Service, depicting Keller and Sullivan, to mark the centennial of Keller's birth. That year, her birth was also recognized by a presidential proclamation from U.S. President Jimmy Carter. Pennsylvania annually commemorates her June 27 birthday as Helen Keller Day. On October 7, 2009, the State of Alabama donated a bronze statue of Keller to the National Statuary Hall Collection, as a replacement for its 1908 statue of education reformer Jabez Lamar Monroe Curry. Keller was posthumously inducted into the Alabama Women's Hall of Fame in 1971. She was one of twelve inaugural inductees to the Alabama Writers Hall of Fame on June 8, 2015.

In 2026, the British alternative rock band Placebo released a single called "Helen Keller", which features the keyboard melody of the hidden instrumental track "H.K. Farewell" from the band's 1996 self-titled debut album. Speaking about the single, Brian Molko explained: "This is a new rock song inspired by the piano melody from 'H.K. Farewell' and named after one of my favourite people from history." In the 1996 hidden track "H.K. Farewell," however, the initials "H.K." stand for Hong Kong, where the band recorded the track.

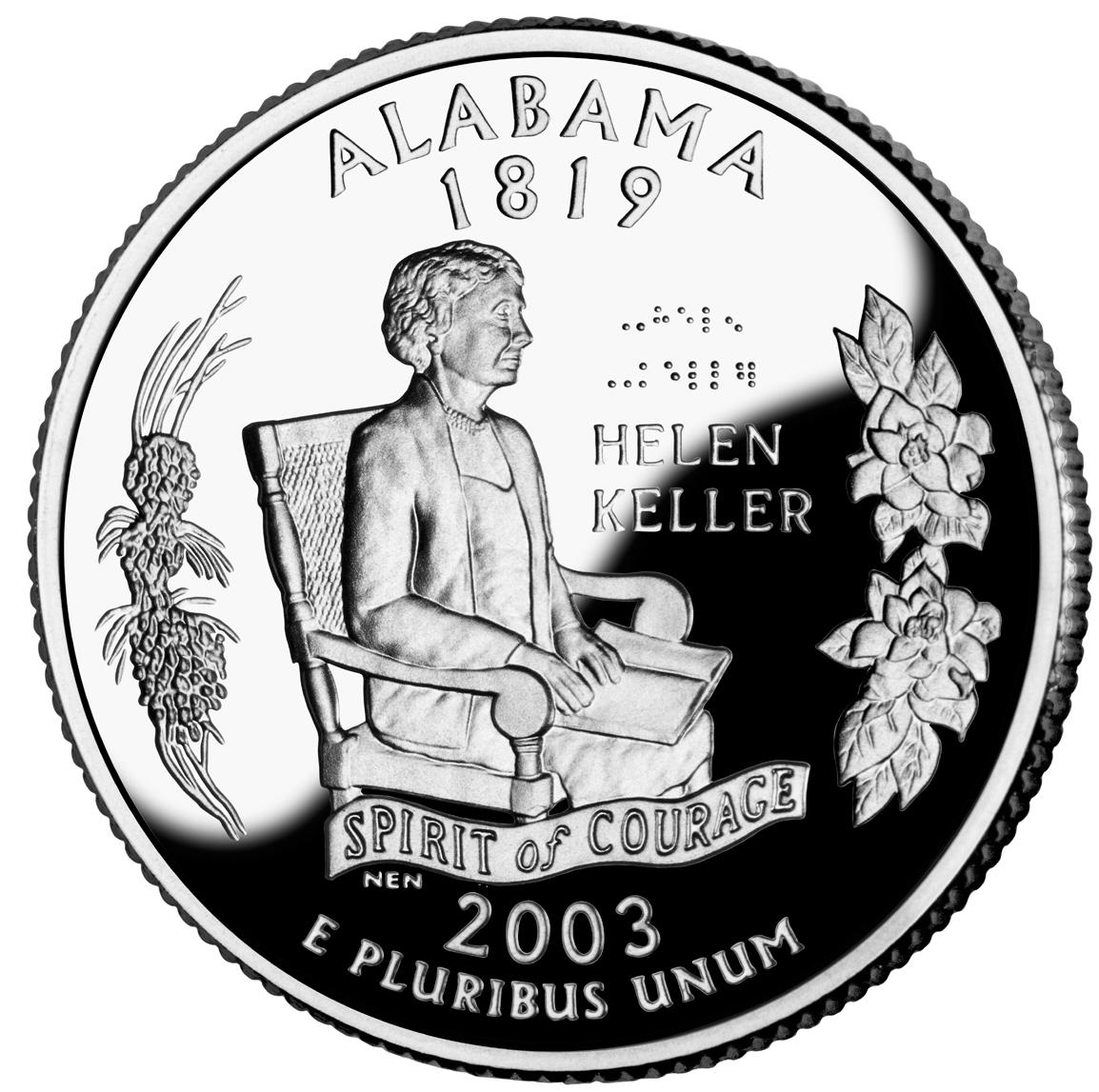
Helen Keller as depicted on the Alabama state quarter. The braille on the coin is English Braille for "HELEN KELLER".

Helen Keller (left) and Anne Sullivan on a U.S.commemorative postage stamp, 1980 issue.

== See also ==
- Helen Keller International – U.S. nonprofit organization
- Helen Keller Services for the Blind – American organization
- Laura Bridgman – American deaf-blind woman (1829–1889)
- List of peace activists
- Perkins School for the Blind
- Ragnhild Kåta – Norwegian deafblind girl who inspired Helen Keller
