= The Story of My Life (biography) =

1903 autobiography of Helen Keller

- Front Cover
- Author: Helen Keller
- Language: English
- Genre: Classic, memoir
- Published: 1903
- Media type: Print
- Pages: 441

The Story of My Life is an autobiography written by Helen Keller and published in 1903, detailing her early life, particularly her experiences with Anne Sullivan. According to The Atlantic, it is one of the earliest and most influential memoirs on disability. Portions of the memoir were adapted by William Gibson for a 1957 Playhouse 90 production, a 1959 Broadway play, a 1962 Hollywood feature film, and the Indian film Black. The book is dedicated to inventor Alexander Graham Bell, who was one of her teachers and an advocate for the deaf.

== Publication history ==
Helen Keller began to write The Story of My Life in 1902, while she was still a student at Radcliffe College. It was published in the Ladies' Home Journal that same year as a series of installments. The following year, it was published by Doubleday, Page & Co. as a book. The book was well received.

== Accusation of plagiarism ==
The Story of My Life faced scrutiny over alleged plagiarism, based on an earlier 1892 incident where her short story "The Frost King" was found to be similar to Margaret T. Canby's (1833-1906) Frost Fairies. In The Nation, Paul Elmer More argued the book lacked literary sincerity because Keller wrote about colors, sounds and visual sensations she could not perceive directly, claiming that because her knowledge was hearsay, her descriptions were essentially vicarious and unconscientious, bordering on a form of ethical plagiarism.

== Adaptations ==
Many adaptations have been made of The Story of My Life, in both play and movie form. In 1959, a play entitled The Miracle Worker was released, based largely on Keller's description of her relationship with her teacher and friend Anne Sullivan.
