= Arthur H. Keller =

American captain and editor (1836–1896)

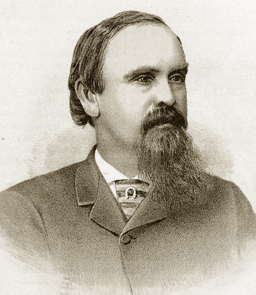
- Keller before c. 1896
- Born: Arthur Henley Keller; February 5, 1836; Tuscumbia, Alabama, U.S
- Died: August 28, 1896 (aged 60); Tishomingo County, Mississippi, U.S
- Burial place: Tishomingo County, Mississippi, U.S
- Spouses: Sarah E. Rosser (m. 1867; death 1877); Catherine Adams (m. 1878)
- Children: 6, including Helen Keller
- Military career
- Allegiance: Confederate States of America
- Branch: Confederate States Army
- Service years: 1861–1863
- Rank: Captain

Arthur Henley Keller (February 5, 1836 – August 28, 1896) was an American Captain and editor who was the father of Helen Keller. He worked for many years as an editor of the Tuscumbia North Alabamian. He served as a captain in the Confederate Army.

== Biography ==
Keller was born on February 5, 1836, in Tuscumbia, Alabama to parents David Keller and Mary Fairfax Keller, née Moore. He graduated law from the University of Virginia in 1858. In November 1861, he enlisted for the Confederate States Army. He was ranked as captain, and fought until July 1863. In December 1874 he purchased the Tuscumbia North Alabamian, which he edited for over thirty years.

On November 12, 1867, Keller married Sarah E. Rosser. They had three children; Fannie, James, and William. Rosser died in March 1877. In July 1878, Keller married Catherine Everett "Kate" Adams and they had three children; Helen, Mildred and Phillips. Keller died on August 28, 1896, at the age of 60. He was later buried in Tishomingo County, Mississippi.
