= Anne Sullivan =

Teacher and companion of Helen Keller (1866–1936)

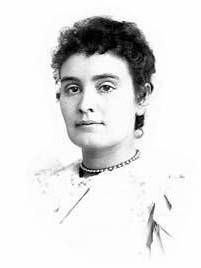
- Sullivan in 1887
- Born: Johanna Mansfield Sullivan; April 14, 1866; Feeding Hills, Agawam, Massachusetts, U.S.
- Died: October 20, 1936 (aged 70); New York City, U.S.
- Resting place: Washington National Cathedral
- Occupation: Teacher
- Spouse: John Albert Macy (m. 1905; died 1932)

Anne Sullivan Macy (born as Johanna Mansfield Sullivan; April 14, 1866 – October 20, 1936) was an American teacher best known for being the instructor and lifelong companion of Helen Keller. At age five, Sullivan contracted trachoma which left her partially blind and without reading or writing skills. Sullivan received her education as a student of the Perkins School for the Blind. Soon after graduation at age 20, she became a teacher to Keller.

== Childhood ==
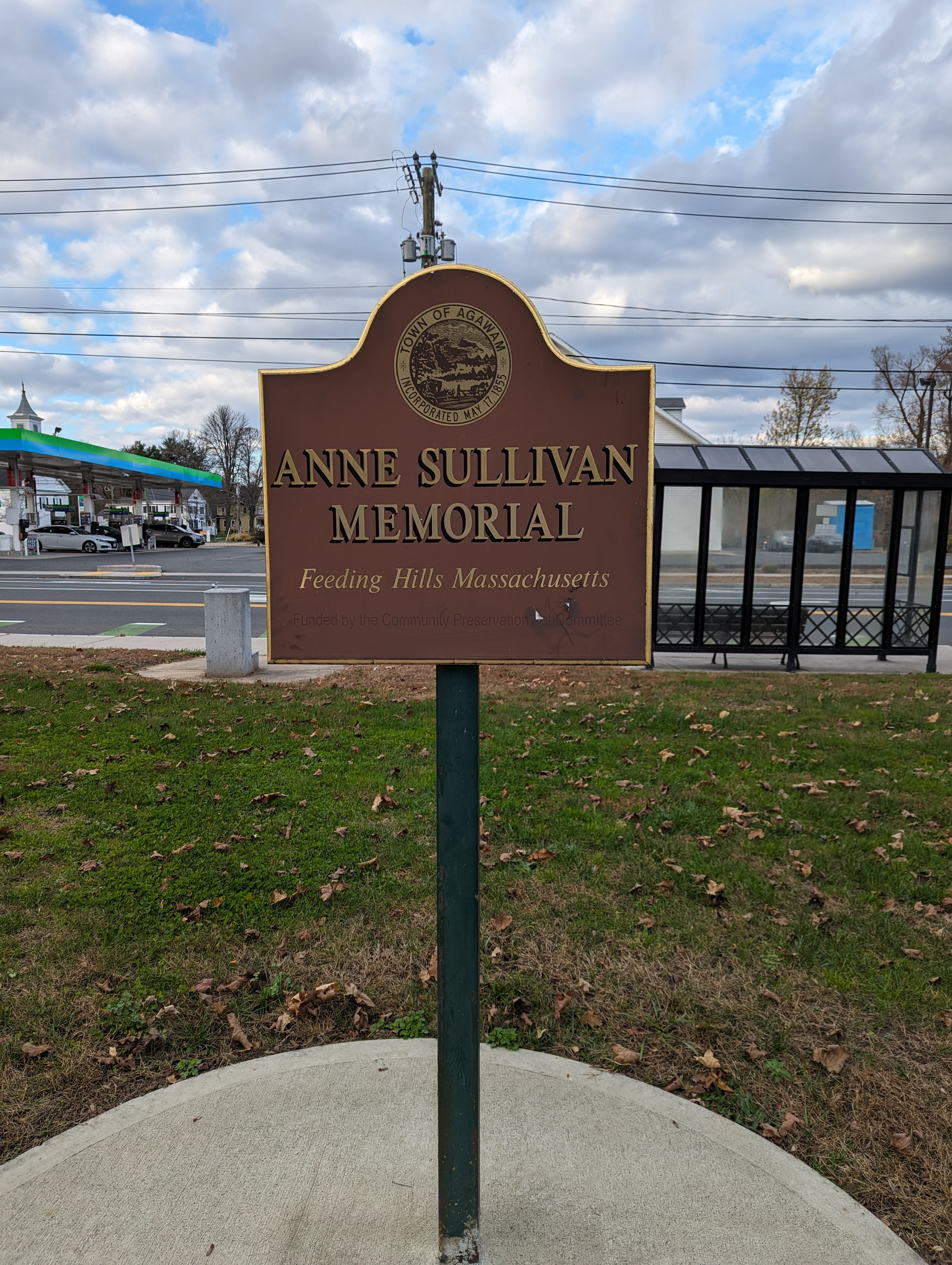
Anne Sullivan Memorial in Feeding Hills, Massachusetts

Sullivan was born on April 14, 1866, in Feeding Hills, Agawam, Massachusetts, United States. The name on her baptismal certificate was Johanna Mansfield Sullivan, but she was called "Anne" or "Annie" from birth. She was the eldest child of Thomas and Alice (née Cloesy) Sullivan, who had emigrated from Ireland to the United States during the Great Famine.

At age five, Sullivan contracted the bacterial eye disease trachoma, which caused many painful infections and, over time, made her nearly blind. Growing up, Sullivan suffered poverty and physical abuse at the hands of her alcoholic father. When she was eight, her mother died from tuberculosis, and her father abandoned the children two years later for fear that he could not raise them on his own. Sullivan and her younger brother, James (Jimmie), were sent to the run-down and overcrowded almshouse in Tewksbury, Massachusetts, today part of Tewksbury Hospital, and their younger sister, Mary, was left to an aunt. Jimmie had a weak hip condition and then died from tuberculosis four months into their stay. Anne remained at Tewksbury after his death and endured two unsuccessful eye operations.

In 1875, as a result of reports of cruelty to inmates at Tewksbury, including sexually perverted practices and cannibalism, the Massachusetts Board of State Charities launched an investigation into the institution. The investigation was led by Franklin Benjamin Sanborn, then chairman of the board, and Samuel Gridley Howe, founder of the Perkins School for the Blind in Boston.

In February 1877, Sullivan was sent to the Soeurs de la Charité hospital in Lowell, Massachusetts, where she had another unsuccessful operation. While there, she helped the nuns in the wards and went on errands in the community until July of that year, when she was sent to the city infirmary, where she had one more unsuccessful operation. She was then transferred back to Tewksbury under duress. Instead of returning to the facility for predominantly ill and insane patients, she was housed with single mothers and unmarried pregnant women.

In 1880, during a subsequent inspection of Tewksbury by Franklin Benjamin Sanborn, now State Inspector of Charities, Sullivan implored him to allow her to be admitted to the Perkins School for the Blind, in Watertown, Massachusetts. She threw herself in front of him, pleading, “Mr. Sanborn, I want to go to school!” Within a matter of months, that plea was granted.

== Education ==
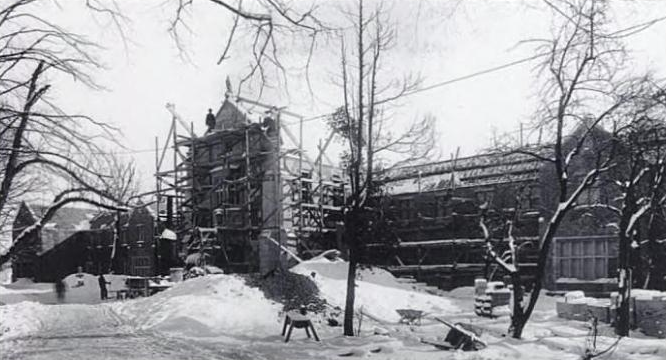
Howe Building, Perkins School for the Blind (1912).

On October 7, 1880, Sullivan began her studies at the Perkins School. Although her first years at Perkins were humiliating because of her rough manners, Sullivan managed to connect with a few teachers and made progress with her learning.

While at Perkins, Sullivan befriended Laura Bridgman, a graduate of Perkins and one of the earliest people with deafblindness to receive a formal education there; Sullivan learned the manual alphabet from Laura. During her time there, Sullivan had a series of eye operations that significantly improved her vision. In June 1886, graduating at age 20 as the valedictorian of her class, Sullivan stated:

Fellow-graduates: Duty bids us go forth into active life. Let us go cheerfully, hopefully, and earnestly, and set ourselves to find our especial part. When we have found it, willingly and faithfully perform it; for every obstacle we overcome, every success we achieve tends to bring man closer to God and make life more as He would have it.

== Career ==
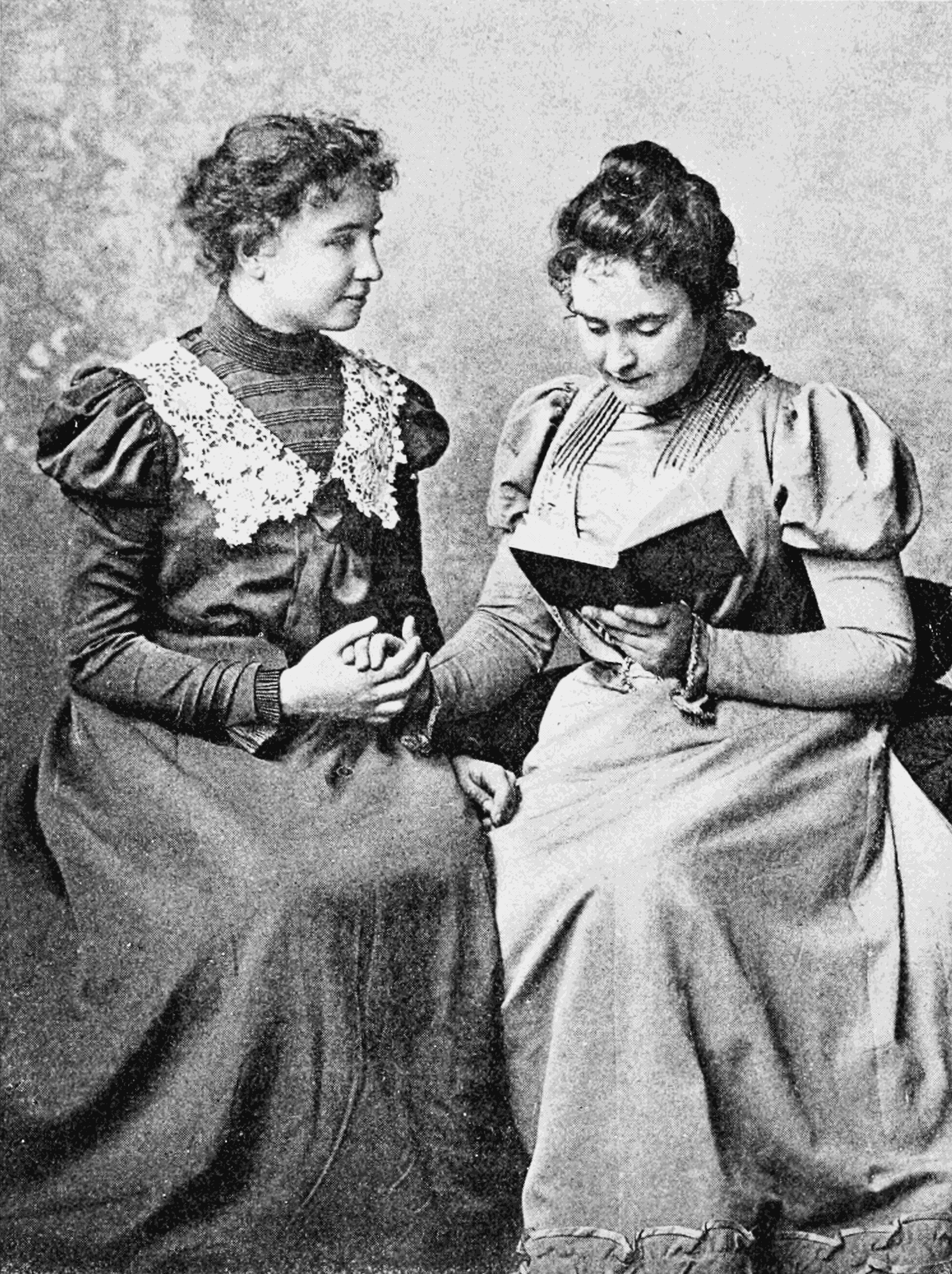
Helen Keller (left) in 1899 with lifelong companion and teacher Anne Sullivan (right). Photo taken by Alexander Graham Bell at his School of Vocal Physiology and Mechanics of Speech.

The summer after Sullivan had graduated, the director of Perkins School for the Blind, Michael Anagnos, was contacted by Arthur Keller, Helen Keller's father, who was in search of a teacher for his seven-year-old deafblind daughter. Anagnos immediately recommended Sullivan for this position and she began her work on March 3, 1887, at the Kellers' home located in Alabama. As soon as she arrived, Sullivan argued with Helen's parents about the Civil War and over the fact that they had owned slaves. At the same time, she quickly connected with Helen. It was the beginning of a 49-year relationship: Sullivan evolved from teacher to governess and finally to companion and friend.

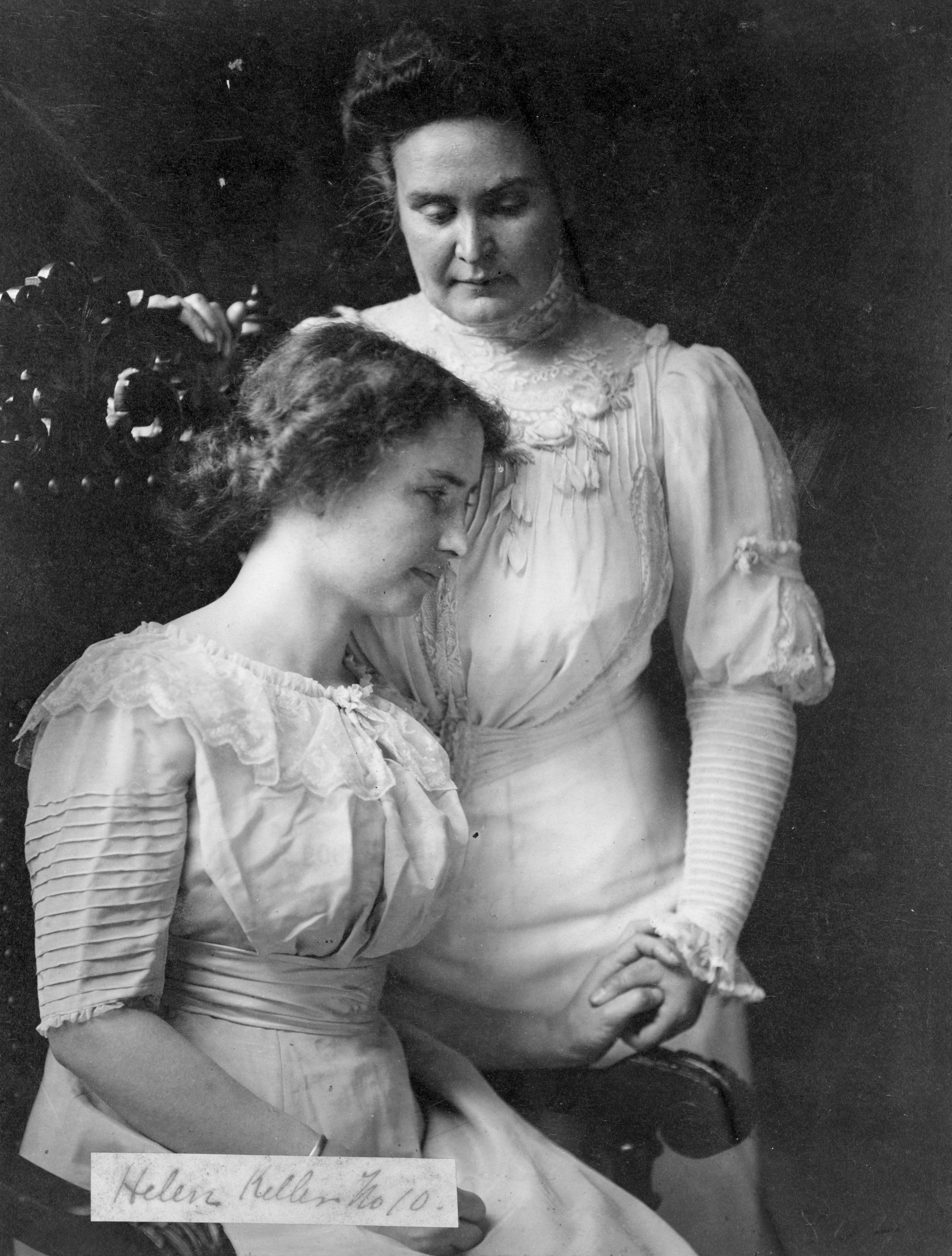
Anne Sullivan (standing) with Helen Keller, c. 1909

Sullivan's curriculum involved a strict schedule, with constant introduction of new vocabulary; however, she quickly changed her teaching method after seeing it did not suit Keller. Instead, Sullivan began to teach her vocabulary based on her own interests, by spelling each word out into Keller's palm; within six months, this method proved to be working as Keller had learned 575 words, some multiplication tables, and the Braille system.

Sullivan strongly encouraged Helen's parents to send her to the Perkins School, where she could have an appropriate education. Once they had agreed, Sullivan took Keller to Boston in 1888 and stayed with her there. Sullivan continued to teach her bright protégée, who soon became famous for her remarkable progress. With the help of the school's director, Anagnos, Keller became a public symbol for the school, helping to increase its funding and donations and making it the most famous and sought-after school for the blind in the country. An accusation of plagiarism against Keller greatly upset Sullivan; she left and never returned but remained influential to the school.

Sullivan remained a close companion to Keller and continued to assist in her education, which ultimately included a degree from Radcliffe College (now part of Harvard University). In 1916, Sullivan and Keller went on a lecture tour under the auspices of the Y.W.C.A. that brought them to the stage at the Mabel Tainter Memorial Building in Menomonie, Wisconsin, on January 22, 1916. During the hour-long presentation, Sullivan, identified as Mrs. Macy in the newspaper account, described her work with Keller, followed by Keller's talk on "Happiness".

== Personal life ==
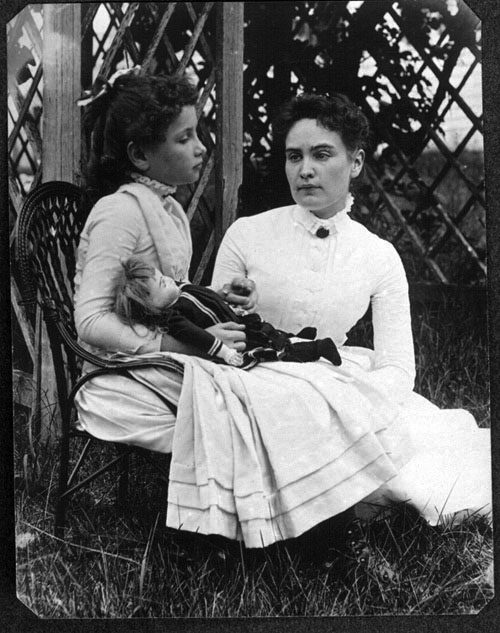
Helen Keller and Anne Sullivan vacationing at Cape Cod in July 1888

On May 3, 1905, Sullivan married Harvard University instructor and literary critic John Albert Macy (1877–1932), who had helped Keller with her publications. When she married, Sullivan was already living with Keller as her personal teacher, so Macy moved into the household of both women. However, within a few years, the marriage began to disintegrate. By 1914, they separated, though Macy is listed as living as a "lodger" with them in the 1920 U.S. Census. As the years progressed after their separation, Macy appears to have faded from her life, and the two never officially divorced. Macy died of a heart attack in 1932. Sullivan never remarried.

== Awards ==
In 1932, Sullivan and Keller were each awarded honorary fellowships from the Educational Institute of Scotland. They were also awarded honorary degrees from Temple University. In 1955, Keller was awarded an honorary degree from Harvard University, and the following year, the director's cottage at the Perkins School was named the Keller-Macy Cottage. In 2003, Sullivan was inducted into the National Women's Hall of Fame.

== Death ==
Sullivan had been seriously visually impaired for almost all of her life, but by 1935, she became completely blind. On October 16, 1936, Sullivan had a coronary thrombosis, fell into a coma, and died four days later at age 70 in the Forest Hills neighborhood of Queens, New York, with Keller holding her hand. Keller described Sullivan as being very agitated during her last month of life, but during the last week, Sullivan was said to return to her normal generous self. Sullivan was cremated and her ashes interred in a memorial at the National Cathedral in Washington, D.C. She was the first woman to be recognized for her achievements in this way. When Keller died in 1968, she was cremated as well and her ashes were interred alongside those of Sullivan.

== Media representation ==
In the 1919 film Deliverance, Sullivan is played by Edith Lyle. Sullivan is the main character in The Miracle Worker by William Gibson, originally produced for television in 1957, in which she was portrayed by Teresa Wright. The Miracle Worker then moved to Broadway and later was produced as a 1962 feature film. Both the play and the film featured Anne Bancroft as Sullivan. Patty Duke, who played Keller on Broadway and in the 1962 film, later played Sullivan in a 1979 television remake. Blythe Danner portrayed her in The Miracle Continues and Roma Downey portrayed her in the TV movie Monday After the Miracle (1998). Alison Elliott portrayed her in a 2000 television movie. Alison Pill played her on Broadway in the short-lived 2010 revival, with Abigail Breslin as Keller. In 1980, the United States Postal Service issued a commemorative stamp, honoring Sullivan and Keller.

== Bibliography ==
- Lash, Joseph (1980). Helen and teacher: the story of Helen Keller and Anne Sullivan Macy. New York: Delacorte Press. ISBN 9780440036548.
- McGinnity, B. L., J. Seymour-Ford, and K. J. Andries. "Anne Sullivan". Perkins School for the Blind. February 14, 2014. Accessed February 14, 2014. Anne Sullivan.
- Nielsen, Kim E. (2009). Beyond the miracle worker: the remarkable life of Anne Sullivan Macy and her extraordinary friendship with Helen Keller. Boston: Beacon Press. ISBN 9780807050507.
- Tewksbury Almshouse patient records—UMass Lowell Library
