= 2015 in film =

2015 in film is an overview of events, including the highest-grossing films, award ceremonies, festivals, and a list of films released and notable deaths.

Fox Film (now 20th Century Fox), Universal City, California and Universal Studios Lot celebrated their 100th anniversaries; The Sound of Music and Dolby celebrated their 50th anniversaries.

== Evaluation of the year ==
Richard Brody of The New Yorker described 2015 as, "one of Hollywood's worst years" but also stated that it was also "a terrific year for movies over all". He emphasized that,

The anticipated Oscarizables have mainly ranged from the blandly enjoyable to the droningly disastrous. Partly, the problem is merely one of scheduling: most of Hollywood's inspired directors, the ones whose images have a natural musical sublimity and complexity, weren't on call this year. My list reflects the unfortunate accident of a calendar year with no release by many of the best American directors working in or out of the Hollywood system, such as Martin Scorsese, Sofia Coppola, Wes Anderson, Miranda July, Terrence Malick, James Gray, David Fincher, Steven Soderbergh, and Paul Thomas Anderson.

== Highest-grossing films ==
The top 10 films released in 2015 by worldwide gross are as follows:

Highest-grossing films of 2015
Rank	Title	Distributor	Worldwide gross
1	Star Wars: The Force Awakens	Disney	$2,068,223,624
2	Jurassic World	Universal	$1,671,537,444
3	Furious 7	Universal	$1,515,341,399
4	Avengers: Age of Ultron	Disney	$1,402,809,540
5	Minions	Universal	$1,159,398,397
6	Spectre	Sony	$880,674,609
7	Inside Out	Disney	$858,811,174
8	Mission: Impossible – Rogue Nation	Paramount	$682,714,267
9	The Hunger Games: Mockingjay – Part 2	Lionsgate	$653,428,261
10	The Martian	20th Century Fox	$630,161,890

Star Wars: The Force Awakens grossed over $2 billion, becoming the third film to surpass that milestone, and the third highest-grossing film of all time. Jurassic World, Furious 7, Avengers: Age of Ultron, and Minions have each grossed over $1 billion, making them among the highest-grossing films of all time. Spectre and Inside Out grossed more than $850 million.

Minions became the first non-Disney animated film and the third animated film overall after Toy Story 3 (2010) and Frozen (2013) to gross over $1 billion, and is currently the sixth highest-grossing animated film of all time.

=== 2015 notable box office records ===
==== Studio records ====
2015 is the first year that a single studio (Universal Pictures) released three films that each grossed over $1 billion, the first year that a single studio released two films that both grossed over $1.5 billion, and the first year that a single studio released two films that both grossed over $1 billion outside of North America.

- Universal also generated $2 billion and $3 billion in a single year at the international box office faster than any studio before, doing so on June 10, June 14, and July 17, 2015, respectively. The previous records was held by 20th Century Fox when it reached $2 and $3 billion on June 15 and July 30, 2010, respectively. Universal previously grossed $2 billion in 2013, reaching the milestone on September 17 of that year. Furthermore, the studio also broke the record for fastest studio to generate $1 billion in the United States and Canada (on June 14, 2015), beating the previous record ascendance achieved by Paramount Pictures on June 22, 2008, and $2 billion (on August 16, 2015), beating the previous speed record of December 25, 2009, held by Warner Bros., and the fastest to $3, $4, and $5 billion worldwide (It achieved the $5 billion milestone on July 17, 2015, breaking the record previously held by Fox near the end of November 2014). Universal is also the first studio to achieve $6 billion at the global box office in one year.
- Walt Disney Studios became the first studio to release three films within a single franchise – the Marvel Cinematic Universe (MCU) – that each grossed over $1 billion, with Avengers: Age of Ultron joining 2012's The Avengers and 2013's Iron Man 3. The MCU also became the highest-grossing film franchise with the release of Avengers: Age of Ultron, surpassing the Harry Potter film franchise ($7.723 billion, 2001–2011), and becoming the first franchise to gross over $8 billion. With the subsequent release of Ant-Man, the MCU also became the first franchise to gross over $9 billion.
- Furious 7 became the highest-grossing film ever distributed by Universal, surpassing the 22-year-old record set by Jurassic Park in 1993. However it shortly lost the record to Jurassic World in June, just two months later. It was also the first film distributed by Universal to gross $1 billion in its initial release, since Jurassic Park did so after it was re-released in 2013.

==== Film records ====
- Furious 7 became the fastest film to reach $1 billion in ticket sales worldwide, doing so in 17 days; this record was later surpassed by Universal's own Jurassic World two months later, accruing the same amount in 13 days; this record was in turn surpassed six months later by Star Wars: The Force Awakens, which accrued $1 billion in 12 days. Furious 7 also became the first American film ever to gross over ¥2 billion (amassing ¥2.426 billion) at the Chinese box office.
- Jurassic World grossed $524.4 million worldwide in its opening weekend, making it the highest-grossing worldwide opening of all time, surpassing Harry Potter and the Deathly Hallows – Part 2 ($483.2 million in 2011). Jurassic World also grossed $208.8 million in North America in its opening weekend, beating the previous record held by The Avengers ($207.4 million in 2012). Both records were later surpassed by Star Wars: The Force Awakens in the same year. It also became the highest-grossing film that was not the highest-grossing film of its year, surpassing Iron Man 3.
- Terminator Genisys became the first American film to earn $400 million worldwide without also grossing $100 million in North America. The only other production to hit that threshold before was the French film The Intouchables (2012).
- Minions became the fastest animated film to $1 billion in 49 days, surpassing Toy Story 3 (75 days). It also becomes the first Non-Disney animated film to gross over $1 billion, and is the highest-grossing spinoff film, as well as the highest-grossing prequel.
- Star Wars: The Force Awakens broke all pre-sale ticket records and grossed $529 million in its opening weekend, making it the highest-grossing worldwide opening of all time, surpassing Jurassic World ($524.4 million on 12–14 June 2015). The Force Awakens also grossed $248 million in North America in its opening weekend, beating the previous record held by Jurassic World ($208.8 million). The film subsequently became the first to exceed $800 million in the domestic box office on January 9 and $900 million on February 5. It also became Disney's first film to gross over $1 billion at the foreign box office, as well as the third film to ever gross over $2 billion worldwide. This makes it the third highest-grossing film of all time.
- 2015 is tied with 2018 and 2026 for the greatest number of films to gross more than $1 billion with five, surpassing 2012's record of four, but later was surpassed in 2019 to have nine films with that milestone. It has also set the record for the greatest number of films crossing the $1.5 billion mark with three.

== Events ==
- January 22, 2015 – Pacific Data Images shuts down as part of DreamWorks Animation's restructuring plans following the box-office underperformance of Mr. Peabody & Sherman and Penguins of Madagascar the year prior, cutting off 500 jobs.
- December 16, 2015 – Steven Spielberg, Reliance Entertainment, Entertainment One and Participant Media launch new production company Amblin Partners, which would produce films using the DreamWorks Pictures, Amblin Entertainment and Participant Media banners. On the same day, they also announced a five-year distribution deal with Universal Pictures, where the films will be distributed and marketed under either the main Universal label, or its specialty label, Focus Features.

=== Award ceremonies ===
Date	Event	Host	Location	Source
January 11	72nd Golden Globe Awards	Hollywood Foreign Press Association	Beverly Hills, California	
January 15	20th Critics' Choice Awards	Broadcast Film Critics Association	Santa Monica, California	
January 24	Producers Guild of America Awards 2014	Producers Guild of America	Beverly Hills, California	
January 25	21st Screen Actors Guild Awards	Screen Actors Guild-American Federation of Television and Radio Artists	Los Angeles, California	
January 26	50th Guldbagge Awards	Swedish Film Institute	Djurgården, Sweden	
January 31	4th AACTA International Awards	Australian Academy of Cinema and Television Arts	Los Angeles, California	
January 31	60th Filmfare Awards	Filmfare	Mumbai, India	
February 2	20th Lumière Awards	Académie des Lumières	Paris, France	
February 4	African-American Film Critics Association Awards 2014	African-American Film Critics Association	Hollywood, California	
February 7	29th Goya Awards	Academy of Cinematographic Arts and Sciences of Spain	Madrid, Spain	
February 7	5th Magritte Awards	Académie André Delvaux	Brussels, Belgium	
February 7	67th Directors Guild of America Awards	Directors Guild of America	Los Angeles, California, U.S.	
February 8	68th British Academy Film Awards	British Academy of Film and Television Arts	London, England	
February 14	67th Writers Guild of America Awards	Writers Guild of America	Manhattan, New York, U.S. & Los Angeles, California, U.S.	
February 15	19th Satellite Awards	International Press Academy	Los Angeles, California	
February 20	40th César Awards	Academy of Cinema Arts and Techniques	Paris, France	
February 21	30th Independent Spirit Awards	Independent Spirit Awards		
February 21	35th Golden Raspberry Awards	Golden Raspberry Awards	Hollywood, California	
February 22	87th Academy Awards	Academy of Motion Picture Arts and Sciences	Hollywood, California	
April 12	2015 MTV Movie Awards	MTV	Los Angeles, California	
May 3	62nd National Film Awards	Directorate of Film Festivals	India	
June 25	41st Saturn Awards	Academy of Science Fiction, Fantasy and Horror Films	Burbank, California	
September 20	2015 FAMAS Awards	Filipino Academy of Movie Arts and Sciences Awards	Newport City, Metro Manila	
December 12	28th European Film Awards	European Film Academy	Berlin, Germany	

=== Festivals ===
Date	Event	Host	Location	Source
January 22 – February 1	2015 Sundance Film Festival	Sundance Institute	Park City, Utah	
February 5–15	65th Berlin International Film Festival	Berlin International Film Festival	Berlin, Germany	
May 13–24	2015 Cannes Film Festival	Cannes Film Festival	Cannes, France	
July 3–11	50th Karlovy Vary International Film Festival	Karlovy Vary International Film Festival	Karlovy Vary, Czechia	
September 2–12	72nd Venice International Film Festival	Venice Film Festival	Venice, Italy	
September 4–13	2015 Deauville American Film Festival	Deauville American Film Festival	Deauville, France	
September 10–20	2015 Toronto International Film Festival	Toronto International Film Festival	Toronto, Ontario	
September 25 – October 11	53rd New York Film Festival	New York Film Festival	New York, New York	
November 13–29	19th Tallinn Black Nights Film Festival	Tallinn Black Nights Film Festival	Tallinn, Estonia	
November 21–28	26th Carthage Film Festival	Carthage Film Festival	Tunis, Tunisia	
December 25 – January 7, 2016	2015 Metro Manila Film Festival	Metro Manila Film Festival	Manila, Philippines	

== Awards ==
Category/Organization	73rd Golden Globe Awards January 10, 2016		21st Critics' Choice Awards January 17, 2016	Producers, Directors, Screen Actors, and Writers Guild Awards	69th BAFTA Awards February 14, 2016	88th Academy Awards February 28, 2016
Category/Organization	Drama	Musical or Comedy	21st Critics' Choice Awards January 17, 2016	Producers, Directors, Screen Actors, and Writers Guild Awards	69th BAFTA Awards February 14, 2016	88th Academy Awards February 28, 2016
Best Film	The Revenant	The Martian	Spotlight	The Big Short	The Revenant	Spotlight
Best Director	Alejandro G. Iñárritu; The Revenant		George Miller; Mad Max: Fury Road	Alejandro G. Iñárritu; The Revenant		
Best Actor	Leonardo DiCaprio; The Revenant	Matt Damon; The Martian	Leonardo DiCaprio; The Revenant			
Best Actress	Brie Larson; Room	Jennifer Lawrence; Joy	Brie Larson; Room			
Best Supporting Actor	Sylvester Stallone; Creed			Idris Elba; Beasts of No Nation	Mark Rylance; Bridge of Spies	
Best Supporting Actress	Kate Winslet; Steve Jobs		Alicia Vikander; The Danish Girl		Kate Winslet; Steve Jobs	Alicia Vikander; The Danish Girl
Best Screenplay, Adapted	Aaron Sorkin; Steve Jobs		Adam McKay and Charles Randolph; The Big Short			
Best Screenplay, Original	Aaron Sorkin; Steve Jobs		Tom McCarthy and Josh Singer; Spotlight			
Best Animated Film	Inside Out					
Best Original Score	The Hateful Eight; Ennio Morricone			—N/a	The Hateful Eight; Ennio Morricone	
Best Original Song	"Writing's on the Wall"; Spectre		"See You Again"; Furious 7	—N/a	—N/a	"Writing's on the Wall"; Spectre
Best Foreign Language Film	Son of Saul			—N/a	Wild Tales	Son of Saul
Best Documentary	—N/a	—N/a	Amy			

Palme d'Or (68th Cannes Film Festival):

Dheepan, directed by Jacques Audiard, France

Golden Lion (72nd Venice International Film Festival):

From Afar (Desde allá), directed by Lorenzo Vigas, Venezuela

Golden Bear (65th Berlin International Film Festival):

Taxi (تاکسی), directed by Jafar Panahi, Iran

== 2015 films ==
=== By country/region ===
- List of American films of 2015
- List of Argentine films of 2015
- List of Australian films of 2015
- List of Bangladeshi films of 2015
- List of Brazilian films of 2015
- List of British films of 2015
- List of Canadian films of 2015
- List of Chinese films of 2015
- List of French films of 2015
- List of Hong Kong films of 2015
- List of Indian films of 2015
  - List of Assamese films of 2015
  - List of Bengali films of 2015
  - List of Bollywood films of 2015
  - List of Punjabi films of 2015
  - List of Gujarati films of 2015
  - List of Kannada films of 2015
  - List of Malayalam films of 2015
  - List of Marathi films of 2015
  - List of Tamil films of 2015
  - List of Telugu films of 2015
  - List of Tulu films of 2015
- List of Indonesian films
- List of Italian films of 2015
- List of Japanese films of 2015
- List of Mexican films of 2015
- List of Pakistani films of 2015
- List of Russian films of 2015
- List of South Korean films of 2015
- List of Spanish films of 2015
- List of Turkish films of 2015

=== By genre/medium ===
- List of action films of 2015
- List of animated feature films of 2015
- List of avant-garde films of 2015
- List of comedy films of 2015
- List of drama films of 2015
- List of horror films of 2015
- List of science fiction films of 2015
- List of thriller films of 2015
- List of western films of 2015

== Deaths ==
Month	Date	Name	Age	Country	Profession	Notable films
January	1	Donna Douglas	81	US	Actress	Frankie & Johnny; Lover Come Back
January	4	Bernard Williams	72	UK	Producer	Daredevil; Manhunter
January	5	Khan Bonfils	42	UK	Actor	Batman Begins; Skyfall
January	6	Lance Percival	81	UK	Actor	Yellow Submarine; Darling Lili
January	7	Rod Taylor	84	Australia	Actor	The Birds; The Time Machine
January	9	Samuel Goldwyn Jr.	88	US	Producer, Director	Master and Commander: The Far Side of the World; The Preacher's Wife
January	10	Brian Clemens	83	UK	Screenwriter	See No Evil; The Tell-Tale Heart
January	10	George Dickerson	81	US	Actor	Death Warrant; Blue Velvet
January	10	Taylor Negron	57	US	Actor	The Last Boy Scout; Fast Times at Ridgemont High
January	10	Francesco Rosi	92	Italy	Director, Screenwriter	The Mattei Affair; Lucky Luciano
January	11	Anita Ekberg	83	Sweden	Actress	La Dolce Vita; War and Peace
January	13	Frank Mazzola	79	US	Actor, Film Editor	Rebel Without a Cause; Demon Seed
January	14	Darren Shahlavi	42	UK	Actor, Stuntman	Ip Man 2; 300
January	14	Layne Tom Jr.	87	US	Actor	Charlie Chan; The Hurricane
January	15	Alan Hirschfield	79	US	Studio Executive	
January	16	Walter Peregoy	89	US	Animator	Sleeping Beauty; One Hundred and One Dalmatians
January	17	Faten Hamama	83	Egypt	Actress	Empire M; Cairo
January	17	Don Harron	90	Canada	Actor	The Best of Everything; The Hospital
January	23	Barrie Ingham	82	UK	Actor	The Great Mouse Detective; The Day of the Jackal
January	29	Rod McKuen	81	US	Composer, Singer	A Boy Named Charlie Brown; The Prime of Miss Jean Brodie
January	30	Geraldine McEwan	82	UK	Actress	Robin Hood: Prince of Thieves; Henry V
January	31	Robert Blees	96	US	Screenwriter	Magnificent Obsession; Dr. Phibes Rises Again
January	31	Lizabeth Scott	92	US	Actress, Singer	The Strange Love of Martha Ivers; Too Late for Tears
February	2	Stewart Stern	92	US	Screenwriter	Rebel Without a Cause; Rachel, Rachel
February	3	Mary Healy	96	US	Actress, Singer	The 5,000 Fingers of Dr. T.; Star Dust
February	4	Monica Scattini	59	Italy	Actress	Nine; Sentimental Maniacs
February	11	Roger Hanin	89	France	Actor, Director, Screenwriter	Tamango; Breathless
February	12	Movita Castaneda	98	US	Actress	Mutiny on the Bounty; Fort Apache
February	14	Louis Jourdan	93	France	Actor, Singer	Octopussy; Gigi
February	15	Eileen Essell	92	UK	Actress	Finding Neverland; Duplex
February	16	Lesley Gore	68	US	Singer, Songwriter	Ski Party; Fame
February	17	June Fairchild	68	US	Actress	Head; Drive, He Said
February	19	Frank Ramírez	65	Colombia	Actor	The Wrath of God; Smith!
February	20	Patricia Norris	83	US	Costume Designer, Production Designer	12 Years a Slave; Scarface
February	21	Bruce Sinofsky	58	US	Documentarian	Metallica: Some Kind of Monster; Brother's Keeper
February	25	Harve Bennett	84	US	Producer, Screenwriter	Star Trek III: The Search for Spock; Star Trek IV: The Voyage Home
February	27	Richard Bakalyan	84	US	Actor	The Fox and the Hound; Chinatown
February	27	Leonard Nimoy	83	US	Actor, Director	Star Trek; Invasion of the Body Snatchers
March	1	Daniel von Bargen	64	US	Actor	Super Troopers; Lord of Illusions
March	3	Lynn Borden	77	US	Actress	Dirty Mary, Crazy Larry; Black Mama White Mama
March	5	Albert Maysles	88	US	Documentarian	Gimme Shelter; Grey Gardens
March	10	Richard Glatzer	63	US	Director, Screenwriter	Still Alice; Quinceañera
March	11	Ralph Taeger	78	US	Actor	X-15; The Carpetbaggers
March	13	Vincent Wong	87	UK	Actor	Die Another Day; Batman
March	14	Ib Melchior	97	Denmark	Director, Screenwriter	Robinson Crusoe on Mars; The Angry Red Planet
March	15	Sally Forrest	86	US	Actress, Dancer	Son of Sinbad; While the City Sleeps
March	20	Walter Grauman	93	US	Director, Producer	633 Squadron; Lady in a Cage
March	20	Gregory Walcott	87	US	Actor	The Eiger Sanction; Plan 9 from Outer Space
March	21	Alberta Watson	60	Canada	Actress	Hackers; The Sweet Hereafter
March	24	Monte Merrick	65	US	Screenwriter	Memphis Belle; 8 Seconds
March	25	Ivo Garrani	91	Italy	Actor	Black Sunday; Holocaust 2000
March	27	Rik Battaglia	88	Italy	Actor	Treasure Island; Esther and the King
March	28	Richard L. Bare	101	US	Director, Screenwriter	Wicked, Wicked; Shoot-Out at Medicine Bend
March	28	Miroslav Ondříček	80	Czech Republic	Cinematographer	Amadeus; Ragtime
March	28	Gene Saks	93	US	Actor, Director	The Odd Couple; Cactus Flower
March	30	Robert Z'Dar	64	US	Actor	Maniac Cop; Tango & Cash
April	1	Robert Walker	54	Canada	Animator, Director	Brother Bear; The Lion King
April	2	Manoel de Oliveira	106	Portugal	Director, Screenwriter	A Talking Picture; Belle Toujours
April	3	Vivian Nathan	98	US	Actress	Klute; Teacher's Pet
April	3	Robert Rietti	91	UK	Actor	James Bond; The Omen
April	5	Richard Dysart	86	US	Actor	Being There; The Thing
April	5	Richard LaSalle	97	US	Composer	The Time Travelers; Diary of a Madman
April	5	Tom Towles	65	US	Actor	House of 1000 Corpses; Henry: Portrait of a Serial Killer
April	5	Julie Wilson	90	US	Actress, Singer	This Could Be the Night; The Strange One
April	6	James Best	88	US	Actor	Sounder; Verboten!
April	7	Eugene Louis Faccuito	90	US	Dancer	Annie Get Your Gun; An American in Paris
April	7	Stan Freberg	88	US	Voice Actor	Lady and the Tramp; Looney Tunes: Back in Action
April	7	Geoffrey Lewis	79	US	Actor	Thunderbolt and Lightfoot; High Plains Drifter
April	10	Paul Almond	83	Canada	Director	Isabel; Captive Hearts
April	10	Judith Malina	88	US	Actress	The Addams Family; Dog Day Afternoon
April	13	Claire Gordon	74	UK	Actress	Konga; Beat Girl
April	22	Gennadi Vengerov	55	Belarus	Actor	Enemy at the Gates; Soldiers of Fortune
April	23	Richard Corliss	71	US	Film Critic	None; critiqued films for Time Magazine
April	25	Don Mankiewicz	93	Germany	Screenwriter	I Want to Live!; The Chapman Report
April	26	Jayne Meadows	95	US	Actress	City Slickers; Lady in the Lake
April	27	Andrew Lesnie	59	Australia	Cinematographer	The Lord of the Rings; King Kong
April	30	Nigel Terry	69	UK	Actor	The Lion in Winter; Excalibur
May	1	Stephen Milburn Anderson	67	US	Director, Screenwriter	South Central; Cash
May	1	Grace Lee Whitney	85	US	Actress	Star Trek; Irma la Douce
May	2	Michael Blake	69	US	Screenwriter	Dances with Wolves; Stacy's Knights
May	2	Norman Thaddeus Vane	86	US	Director, Screenwriter	Mrs. Brown, You've Got a Lovely Daughter; Frightmare
May	4	William Bast	83	US	Screenwriter	The Valley of Gwangi; The Betsy
May	4	Ellen Albertini Dow	101	US	Actress	The Wedding Singer; Sister Act
May	6	William Bronder	84	US	Actor	Stand by Me; Yes, Giorgio
May	7	Arieh Elias	94	Israel	Actor	Kazablan; Bonjour Monsieur Shlomi
May	9	Elizabeth Wilson	94	US	Actress	The Graduate; The Addams Family
May	9	Christopher Wood	79	UK	Screenwriter	The Spy Who Loved Me; Remo Williams: The Adventure Begins
May	13	Gill Dennis	74	US	Screenwriter	Walk the Line; Return to Oz
May	14	B.B. King	89	US	Singer, Actor	Blues Brothers 2000; Spies Like Us
May	15	Michael Campus	80	US	Director	Z.P.G.; The Mack
May	15	John Stephenson	91	US	Actor	At Long Last Love; Charlotte's Web
May	15	Donald Wrye	80	US	Director	Ice Castles; An Impression of John Steinbeck: Writer
May	16	Jackie Basehart	63	US	Actor	The Inglorious Bastards; Tea with Mussolini
May	17	Claude Carliez	90	France	Stuntman	The Professional; Valmont
May	20	Mary Ellen Trainor	62	US	Actress	The Goonies; Die Hard
May	23	John Carter	87	US	Actor	Scarface; Badlands
May	23	Anne Meara	85	US	Actress	Fame; Reality Bites
May	26	Vicente Aranda	88	Spain	Director	The Blood Spattered Bride; Lovers
May	26	Claudio Caligari	67	Italy	Director, Screenwriter	Toxic Love; Don't Be Bad
May	25	Russell Wolfe	50	US	Producer	God's Not Dead; Do You Believe?
May	28	Reynaldo Rey	75	US	Actor	Friday; White Men Can't Jump
May	29	Betsy Palmer	88	US	Actress	Friday the 13th; Mister Roberts
May	30	Jake D'Arcy	60	UK	Actor	Gregory's Girl; The Little Vampire
May	30	Julie Harris	94	UK	Costume Designer	Live and Let Die; Darling
June	2	Alberto De Martino	85	Italy	Director, Screenwriter	Holocaust 2000; The Pumaman
June	4	Hugh Johnson	69	Ireland	Cinematographer, Director	G.I. Jane; The Chronicles of Riddick
June	5	Richard Johnson	87	UK	Actor	The Haunting; Lara Croft: Tomb Raider
June	5	Seth Winston	64	US	Director, Producer, Screenwriter	She's Out of Control; Session Man
June	7	Christopher Lee	93	UK	Actor	Dracula; The Lord of the Rings
June	9	Jean Gruault	90	France	Screenwriter	The Story of Adele H.; My American Uncle
June	10	Robert Chartoff	81	US	Producer	Rocky; Raging Bull
June	10	Julie Kirkham	61	US	Producer	Black Rain; Anna and the King
June	11	Ron Moody	91	UK	Actor	Oliver!; The Twelve Chairs
June	12	Rick Ducommun	62	Canada	Actor	The 'Burbs; Scary Movie
June	12	Monica Lewis	93	US	Actress, Singer	Earthquake; Affair with a Stranger
June	13	Junix Inocian	64	Philippines	Actor	Mortdecai; The 51st State
June	13	George Winslow	69	US	Actor	My Pal Gus; Gentlemen Prefer Blondes
June	15	Kirk Kerkorian	98	US	Studio Executive	
June	16	Stephen Blauner	81	US	Producer	Drive, He Said; The King of Marvin Gardens
June	17	Nicola Badalucco	86	Italy	Screenwriter	The Damned; Death in Venice
June	18	Jack Rollins	100	US	Producer	Annie Hall; Manhattan
June	18	John M. Stephens	82	US	Cinematographer	Billy Jack; Blacula
June	21	Tony Longo	53	US	Actor	Angels in the Outfield; Rapid Fire
June	22	Laura Antonelli	73	Italy	Actress	The Innocent; Passion of Love
June	22	James Horner	61	US	Composer	Titanic; Braveheart
June	23	Magali Noël	83	France	Actress, Singer	La Dolce Vita; Amarcord
June	23	Dick Van Patten	86	US	Actor	Spaceballs; High Anxiety
June	25	Patrick Macnee	93	UK	Actor	The Howling; A View to a Kill
June	28	Jack Carter	93	US	Actor	The Horizontal Lieutenant; History of the World, Part I
June	30	Edward Burnham	98	UK	Actor	To Sir, with Love; Little Dorrit
July	1	Sergio Sollima	94	Italy	Director, Screenwriter	The Big Gundown; Città violenta
July	3	Diana Douglas	92	US	Actress	Planes, Trains and Automobiles; It Runs in the Family
July	3	Amanda Peterson	43	US	Actress	Can't Buy Me Love; Annie
July	3	Jacques Sernas	89	Lithuania	Actor	Helen of Troy; 55 Days at Peking
July	6	Jerry Weintraub	77	US	Producer	Ocean's Eleven; The Karate Kid
July	8	Irwin Keyes	63	US	Actor	The Flintstones; Intolerable Cruelty
July	9	Michael Masser	74	US	Composer, Songwriter	Mahogany; The Greatest
July	10	Roger Rees	71	UK	Actor	Robin Hood: Men in Tights; Frida
July	10	Omar Sharif	83	Egypt	Actor	Lawrence of Arabia; Doctor Zhivago
July	15	Aubrey Morris	89	UK	Actor	A Clockwork Orange; The Wicker Man
July	17	Nova Pilbeam	95	UK	Actress	The Man Who Knew Too Much; Young and Innocent
July	18	George Coe	86	US	Actor	Kramer vs. Kramer; The Stepford Wives
July	18	Alex Rocco	79	US	Actor	The Godfather; The Wedding Planner
July	19	Van Alexander	100	US	Composer	Strait-Jacket; Andy Hardy Comes Home
July	19	Douglas S. Cook	56	US	Screenwriter	The Rock; Double Jeopardy
July	21	Theodore Bikel	91	Austria	Actor, Singer	My Fair Lady; The Defiant Ones
July	22	Natasha Parry	84	UK	Actress	Romeo and Juliet; Midnight Lace
July	25	Robin Phillips	75	UK	Actor	Tales from the Crypt; Two Gentlemen Sharing
July	27	Tony Vogel	73	UK	Actor	Raiders of the Lost Ark; Mission: Impossible
July	28	Shawn Robinson	41	US	Stuntman	Transformers; Guardians of the Galaxy
July	29	Antony Holland	95	UK	Actor	McCabe & Mrs. Miller; The Accused
July	31	Roddy Piper	61	Canada	Actor	They Live; Hell Comes to Frogtown
August	3	Coleen Gray	92	US	Actress	Red River; The Killing
August	5	George Cole	90	UK	Actor	Cleopatra; Scrooge
August	5	Joyce Ingalls	65	US	Actress	Deadly Force; Paradise Alley
August	7	Terrence Evans	81	US	Actor	Terminator 2: Judgment Day; The Texas Chainsaw Massacre
August	7	Uggie	13	US	Actor	The Artist; Water for Elephants
August	9	Jack Gold	85	UK	Director	Aces High; Man Friday
August	13	Danford B. Greene	87	US	Film Editor	MASH; Blazing Saddles
August	16	Anna Kashfi	80	India	Actress	The Mountain; Cowboy
August	17	Yvonne Craig	78	US	Actress, Singer	Gidget; Kissin' Cousins
August	18	Bud Yorkin	89	US	Director, Producer	Inspector Clouseau; Divorce American Style
August	20	Melody Patterson	66	US	Actress	Blood and Lace; The Cycle Savages
August	26	Peter Kern	66	Austria	Actor, Director, Screenwriter	Hitler: A Film from Germany; Despair
August	30	Wes Craven	76	US	Director, Producer, Screenwriter	A Nightmare on Elm Street; Scream
September	1	Dean Jones	84	US	Actor	The Love Bug; Beethoven
September	4	Jean Darling	93	US	Actress	Our Gang; Jane Eyre
September	4	Warren Murphy	81	US	Screenwriter	Lethal Weapon 2; The Eiger Sanction
September	5	Setsuko Hara	95	Japan	Actress	Tokyo Story; Late Spring
September	5	Alan Steel	79	Italy	Actor	The Giant of Marathon; Samson and the Slave Queen
September	6	Martin Milner	83	US	Actor	Sweet Smell of Success; Valley of the Dolls
September	7	Merv Adelson	85	US	Producer	Twilight's Last Gleaming; The Choirboys
September	7	Dickie Moore	89	US	Actor	Out of the Past; Sergeant York
September	10	Franco Interlenghi	83	Italy	Actor	The Barefoot Contessa; Shoeshine
September	12	Frank D. Gilroy	89	US	Director, Screenwriter	Desperate Characters; The Fastest Gun Alive
September	17	D. M. Marshman Jr.	92	US	Screenwriter	Sunset Boulevard; Second Chance
September	18	Nancy Bernstein	55	US	Visual Effects Artist, Producer	Rise of the Guardians; Armageddon
September	20	Jack Larson	87	US	Actor, Producer	Superman Returns; Johnny Trouble
September	21	Yoram Gross	88	Poland	Director	Blinky Bill: The Mischievous Koala; The Little Convict
September	22	Derek Ware	77	UK	Actor, Stuntman	The Italian Job; Robin Hood: Prince of Thieves
September	27	Howard A. Anderson, Jr.	95	US	Visual Effects Artist	Some Like It Hot; Superman
September	27	John Guillermin	89	UK	Director, Producer	King Kong; The Towering Inferno
September	29	Pat Woodell	71	US	Actress	The Big Doll House; The Woman Hunt
October	4	Yves Barsacq	84	France	Actor	Love and Death; Hit!
October	5	Chantal Akerman	65	Belgium	Director, Screenwriter	Jeanne Dielman; Almayer's Folly
October	5	Larry Brezner	73	US	Producer	Throw Momma from the Train; Good Morning, Vietnam
October	5	Andrew Rubin	69	US	Actor	Police Academy; Little Miss Marker
October	6	Kevin Corcoran	66	US	Actor, Producer	Old Yeller; Swiss Family Robinson
October	7	Gene Allen	97	US	Art Director, Production Designer	My Fair Lady; A Star Is Born
October	8	Richard Davies	89	UK	Actor	Please Sir!; Zulu
October	9	Jean Badal	88	Hungary	Cinematographer	What's New Pussycat?; Playtime
October	10	Penelope Houston	88	UK	Film Critic	None; critiqued films for Sight and Sound
October	10	Tex Rudloff	89	US	Sound Engineer	The Buddy Holly Story; Halloween
October	11	Bob Minkler	78	US	Sound Engineer	Star Wars; Tron
October	12	Joan Leslie	90	US	Actress	Yankee Doodle Dandy; Sergeant York
October	21	Marty Ingels	79	US	Actor	If It's Tuesday, This Must Be Belgium; For Singles Only
October	23	Leon Bibb	93	US	Singer, Actor	For Love of Ivy; The Lost Man
October	24	Christopher Chapman	88	Canada	Director	A Place to Stand; Kelly
October	24	Maureen O'Hara	95	Ireland	Actress	Miracle on 34th Street; The Parent Trap
October	27	Betsy Drake	92	US	Actress	Intent to Kill; Dancing in the Dark
October	31	Charles Herbert	66	US	Actor	The Fly; Houseboat
November	1	Fred Thompson	73	US	Actor	Die Hard 2; The Hunt for Red October
November	2	Colin Welland	81	UK	Actor, Screenwriter	Chariots of Fire; Straw Dogs
November	3	David Graham	91	US	Casting Director	Purple Rain; The Turning Point
November	4	Melissa Mathison	65	US	Screenwriter	E.T. the Extra-Terrestrial; The Black Stallion
November	5	Ritch Brinkley	71	US	Actor	Breakdown; Cabin Boy
November	7	Gunnar Hansen	68	Iceland	Actor	The Texas Chain Saw Massacre; Campfire Tales
November	8	Angad Paul	45	UK	Producer	Lock, Stock and Two Smoking Barrels; Snatch
November	14	Warren Mitchell	89	UK	Actor	Jabberwocky; Help!
November	15	Dora Doll	93	France	Actress	Julia; The Young Lions
November	15	Saeed Jaffrey	86	India	Actor	Gandhi; The Man Who Would Be King
November	15	Nicoletta Machiavelli	71	Italy	Actress	Navajo Joe; Candy
November	15	Moira Orfei	83	Italy	Actress	Under Ten Flags; Samson and the Slave Queen
November	16	Michael C. Gross	86	US	Producer	Ghostbusters; Beethoven
November	19	Rex Reason	86	US	Actor	This Island Earth; The Creature Walks Among Us
November	20	Keith Michell	88	Australia	Actor	Henry VIII and His Six Wives; The Executioner
November	25	Beth Rogan	84	UK	Actress	Mysterious Island; Compelled
November	25	Elmo Williams	102	US	Film Editor, Director, Producer	High Noon; 20,000 Leagues Under the Sea
November	27	Barbro Hiort af Ornäs	94	Sweden	Actress	Brink of Life; All These Women
November	28	Marjorie Lord	97	US	Actress	Boy, Did I Get a Wrong Number!; Sherlock Holmes in Washington
November	30	Eldar Ryazanov	88	Russia	Director, Screenwriter	Hussar Ballad; Office Romance
November	30	Steve Shagan	88	US	Screenwriter	Save the Tiger; Primal Fear
December	2	Gabriele Ferzetti	90	Italy	Actor	On Her Majesty's Secret Service; Once Upon a Time in the West
December	4	Robert Loggia	85	US	Actor	Big; Jagged Edge
December	5	Marília Pêra	72	Brazil	Actress	Pixote; Central Station
December	6	Nicholas Smith	81	UK	Actor	Are You Being Served?; Wallace & Gromit: The Curse of the Were-Rabbit
December	6	Holly Woodlawn	69	US	Actress	Trash; Women in Revolt
December	7	Shirley Stelfox	74	UK	Actress	Personal Services; Nineteen Eighty-Four
December	10	Denis Héroux	75	Canada	Producer, Director	Quest for Fire; Atlantic City
December	14	Edmund Lyndeck	90	US	Actor	Big Daddy; Enchanted
December	15	Ken Pogue	81	Canada	Actor	The Dead Zone; The 6th Day
December	19	Louis DiGiaimo	77	US	Casting Director, Producer	The Godfather; The Exorcist
December	22	Brooke McCarter	52	US	Actor	The Lost Boys; Thrashin'
December	25	Jason Wingreen	95	US	Actor	The Empire Strikes Back; Airplane!
December	27	Franco Giacobini	89	Italy	Actor	Erik the Conqueror; The Mercenary
December	27	Haskell Wexler	93	US	Cinematographer, Director	Bound for Glory; Who's Afraid of Virginia Woolf?
December	31	Wayne Rogers	82	US	Actor	Cool Hand Luke; Ghosts of Mississippi

== Film debuts ==
- Anthony Bajon – Les Ogres
- Anna Grace Barlow – Perspective: Chapter 1; the Party
- Jon Bass – Ratter
- Zazie Beetz – James White
- Brian Patrick Butler – Bullets, Fangs and Dinner at 8
- Diego Calva – I Promise You Anarchy
- Kiersey Clemons – Dope
- Thomas Cocquerel – Kidnapping Freddy Heineken
- Jamie Demetriou – Bill
- Maya Erskine – Frankenstein
- Jack Dylan Grazer – Tales of Halloween
- Nicholas Hamilton – Strangerland
- Brian Tyree Henry – Puerto Ricans in Paris
- Miguel Herrán − Nothing in Return
- Kirby Howell-Baptiste – Textbook Adulthood
- Hannah John-Kamen – Star Wars: The Force Awakens
- Sofia Lebedeva – The Dawns Here Are Quiet
- Abbey Lee – Mad Max: Fury Road
- Gabriel Leone – Garoto
- Billie Lourd – Star Wars: The Force Awakens
- Brigette Lundy-Paine – Irrational Man
- Charlotte McKinney – Joe Dirt 2: Beautiful Loser
- Daisy Ridley – Scrawl
- Géza Röhrig – Son of Saul
- Natasha Rothwell – A Year and Change
- Eugenia Suárez – Abzurdah
- Angela Yuen - Are You Here
