= Paul Aaron =

American film director and producer (born 1943)

- Born: April 23, 1943 (age 83); Hoosick Falls, New York, U.S.
- Education: Bennington College
- Occupations: Director; producer; screenwriter
- Spouse: Patricia Taylor (m. 1970; div. 1971)
- Relatives: Keanu Reeves (step-son)
- Awards: See below

Paul Aaron (born April 23, 1943) is an American director, producer, and screenwriter who has worked variously in theatre, film, and television.

== Life and career ==
Aaron was born in Hoosick Falls, New York, and graduated from Bennington College in 1966.

=== Theatre ===
After directing a touring production of The Prime of Miss Jean Brodie starring Kim Hunter, he became the Casting and New Programs Director for the Mark Taper Forum, where he founded an actors' workshop and directed several plays. His revival of The Tenth Man, starring Richard Dreyfuss, earned him a Los Angeles Drama Critics Circle for Best Director in 1977.

In 1969, he directed Peter Link's Off-Broadway rock musical Salvation. The following year, he made his Broadway debut directing Paris Is Out!, with Sam Levene and Molly Picon. His other Broadway directing credits included the Kander and Ebb musical 70, Girls, 70 (1971) and the revue That's Entertainment (1972).

=== Film and TV ===
His film directorial debut was 1978's A Different Story. The following year, he directed the Chuck Norris action film A Force of One. He also co-wrote the story for Norris' 1980 film The Octagon. His other films include Deadly Force (1983), Maxie (1985), and Morgan Stewart's Coming Home (1987). Aaron was nominated for a Directors Guild of America Award for the 1979 made-for-television adaptation of The Miracle Worker. He has directed several other telefilms, and wrote and produced the short-lived drama series Under One Roof with James Earl Jones.

== Personal life ==
Aaron is the stepfather of actor Keanu Reeves.

== Filmography ==
=== Film ===
Year	Title	Functioned as			Notes	Ref.
Year	Title	Director	Producer	Writer	Notes	Ref.
1978	A Different Story	Yes	No	No		
1979	A Force of One	Yes	No	No		
1980	The Octagon	No	No	Yes	Story by	
1983	Deadly Force	Yes	No	No		
1985	Maxie	Yes	No	No		
1987	Morgan Stewart's Coming Home	Yes	No	No	Credited as 'Alan Smithee'	
1991	Bill & Ted's Bogus Journey	No	Yes	No	Co-producer	
1999	In Too Deep	No	No	Yes		
2006	Looking for Sunday	No	Yes	No		
2007	Skills like This	No	Yes	No		
2016	Devi	No	No	Yes		

=== Television ===
Year	Title	Functioned as			Notes	Ref.
Year	Title	Director	Producer	Writer	Notes	Ref.
1966	12 O'Clock High	No	No	No	Actor; as Corporal; Episode: "Cross-Hairs on Death"	
1986	The Magical World of Disney	No	Exec.	No	Episode: "Casebusters"	
1995	Under One Roof	No	Exec.	Yes	2 episodes	

==== TV films and miniseries ====
Year	Title	Functioned as			Ref.
Year	Title	Director	Producer	Writer	Ref.
1979	The Miracle Worker	Yes	No	No	
1981	Thin Ice	Yes	No	No	
1982	Maid in America	Yes	No	No	
1984	When She Says No	Yes	No	No	
1987	In Love and War	Yes	No	No	
1987	Free Spirit	Yes	No	No	
1988	Save the Dog!	Yes	Exec.	No	
1993	Laurel Avenue	No	Exec.	Yes	
1994	Untamed Love	Yes	No	No	
1996	Grand Avenue	No	Exec.	No	

== Stage credits (partial) ==
Year	Title	Functioned as		Venue	Notes	Ref.
Year	Title	Director	Producer	Venue	Notes	Ref.
1969–70	Salvation	Yes	No	Jan Hus Playhouse, New York City		
1970	Paris Is Out!	Yes	No	Brooks Atkinson Theatre, New York City		
1971	70, Girls, 70	Yes	No	Broadhurst Theatre, New York City		
1971-72	Love Me, Love My Children	Yes	Yes	Mercer-O'Casey Theatre, New York City		
1972	That's Entertainment	Yes	No	Edison Theatre, New York City		
1973	Ring-a-Levio	Yes	No	Studio Arena Theatre, New York City		
1973	Molly	Yes	No	Alvin Theatre, New York City	Replaced before opening	
1974	The Burnt Flowerbed	Yes	No	Roundabout Theatre, New York City		
1977	The Tenth Man	Yes	No	Mark Taper Forum, Los Angeles		
1979	The Miracle Worker	Yes	No	Royal Poinciana Playhouse, Palm Beach		
1981	A Talent for Murder	Yes	No	Biltmore Theatre, New York City		

== Awards and nominations ==
Institution	Year	Category	Work	Result
Brussels International Fantastic Film Festival	1986	Silver Raven	Maxie	Won
Directors Guild of America Awards	1980	Specials/Movies for TV/Actuality	The Miracle Worker	Nominated
Fantasporto	1987	Best Film	Maxie	Nominated
Los Angeles Drama Critics Circle	1977	Best Direction	The Tenth Man	Won
