= Deadly Force (disambiguation) =

Deadly force also known as lethal force is force that is likely to cause either serious bodily injury or death to another person. It may also refer to:

- Deadly Force (film), 1983 American action film
- Deadly Force (TV series), 2000 Russian crime series
