= Stephen Verona =

American filmmaker (1940–2019)

- Born: September 11, 1940; Springfield, Illinois, U.S.
- Died: July 13, 2019 (aged 78); Los Angeles, California, U.S.
- Occupations: Filmmaker, photographer, painter
- Spouse: Ann Verona

Stephen Verona (September 11, 1940 – July 13, 2019) was an American filmmaker, photographer and painter. He was known for writing, producing and directing the 1974 film The Lords of Flatbush. He was also nominated for the Academy Award for Best Live Action Short Film at the 44th Academy Awards for making the short film The Rehearsal.

== Early life and education ==
Verona was born on September 11, 1940, in Springfield, Illinois. He was raised in Brooklyn, where he attended Madison High School.

== Personal life and death ==
At the time of his death, Verona was married to Ann Verona. Verona died at the age of 78 of lung cancer in Los Angeles on July 13, 2019.

== Filmography ==
Year	Film	Credited as			
Year	Film	Film director	Film producer	Screenwriter	Notes
1969	The Rehearsal (short film)	Yes	Yes	No	Also editor
1974	The Lords of Flatbush	Yes	Yes	Yes	Co-directed with Martin Davidson
1975	Speeding? (short film)	No	No	No	Actor portraying Pick up Truck Driver
1976	Pipe Dreams	Yes	Yes	Yes	
1979	Boardwalk	Yes	No	Yes	
1987	Talking Walls	Yes	No	Yes	
1988	Angela Lansbury's Positive Moves	Yes	Yes	No	Fitness Video Tape
2003	Wie tauscht man seine Eltern um?	No	No	Yes	TV movie
