= John Manikoff =

- Birth name: Vitold John Manikoff
- Born: September 19, 1951; Pontiac, Michigan, US
- Died: January 11, 2011 (aged 59); Mount Pleasant, Michigan, US
- Genres: Pop/rock
- Occupation(s): Musician, graphic designer
- Instrument(s): Guitar, keyboard

John Manikoff (September 19, 1951 – January 11, 2011) was an American singer-songwriter, musician, painter, and illustrator of children's books.

== Personal life ==
Vitold John Manikoff, commonly known as John Manikoff, was born on September 19, 1951, in Pontiac, Michigan. He was the son of Vitold John Manikoff and Jane Holt. Manikoff graduated from Lahser High School in Bloomfield Hills, Michigan, in 1969 and attended Oakland Community College for a brief period. He then received an associate degree from Glendale Community College in Glendale, California. In 1999, he received a degree in graphic design from the School of Graphic Design at Platt College near Los Angeles, California. As a musician, Manikoff traveled extensively throughout the United States, but his summers were frequently spent on Mackinac Island, Michigan, at a cabin built by his great-grandparents in 1902. Prior to his death, he resided in Nassau, Florida. Manikoff Manikoff died of cancer at the Woodland Hospice House in Mount Pleasant, Michigan, on January 21, 2011, and was cremated.

== Music career ==
John Manikoff was both a songwriter and a musical performer. He began his music career at an early age, having learned to play the piano at the age of 5. He initially performed his songs locally in Michigan and then traveled around the United States and Canada performing his music, eventually ending up in Los Angeles, California. Manikoff played piano with the Bad Boys, a rock group that included drummer Michael Clarke of the Byrds and the Flying Burrito Brothers. He was also a founding member of and pianist for the band Catsey in Boulder, Colorado. In addition, Manikoff opened for several musicians, including Bob Seger, Etta James, Richie Havens, Alice Cooper, and Joe Cocker.

Manikoff contributed as a performer to several music albums. He was a backing vocalist on an album by Buddy Greco, Ready for Your Love (1984). He played piano on two albums by punk rock musician Jeff Dahl: (Ultra Under [1991] and Wicked [1992]). He also played piano on an album by Amy Lamotta, Playing Dead/Look at Me (1992), which was produced by Amy Lamotta and Jeff Dahl.

In partnership with Timothy Duckworth, John Manikoff composed and performed the song "Prince of the City," which was included on the soundtrack for the 1987 movie Morgan Stewart's Coming Home. The movie featured Jon Cryer as Morgan Stewart, Lynn Redgrave as his mother, Nancy Stewart, and Nicholas Pryor as his father, Tom Stewart. The song was played as Morgan drove through the streets of Washington, D.C. Manikoff also composed the music for the song "Tell the Night," which was included on an album by Peggy March, Always and Forever (2012).

After a hiatus from the music field to pursue oil painting, Manikoff returned to performing his music in 2008. In 2010, he recorded an album of his songs titled John Manikoff's Album. This collection of 13 songs includes what is perhaps his signature composition, "Take Me to Mackinac Island." The album is currently available from several Internet streaming music services.

According to his LinkedIn entry, John Manikoff was the owner, president, producer, staff writer, professional artist, and graphic designer at Rockmanikoff Music in Lansing, Michigan. He was also a member of the American Society of Composers, Authors and Publishers (ASCAP)

== Fine arts career ==
Although he was primarily known as a musician, John Manikoff was also involved in the graphic and fine arts. He frequently supported himself by working as a freelance graphic designer and art director, having received formal training in graphic arts. In 2003, he took a hiatus from his music and returned to Michigan to focus on oil painting. The summer scenery of Mackinac Island formed the primary subject matter, and many of his paintings featured views of the island from the family's cabin at British Landing. Manikoff also painted portraits. He frequently donated his paintings to local fund-raising events.

John Manikoff provided illustrations for two short books for children that were written by his sister, Caroline Sheppard. The first book, published in 1998, was Brave Bart, which was intended for children who were traumatized and/or grieving. The second book, published in 2003, was Shadow Moves, which was meant for children and their families who were involved in a difficult move.

Manikoff was a member of the Mid-Michigan Art Guild, Lansing Art Gallery, and Oil Painters of America.

In 2007, Manikoff donated two paintings to Mackinac Island-based charities, one to the Wawashkamo Golf Club and another to the Mackinac Horsemen's Association.
