= The Miracle Worker (1979 film) =

- Genre: Drama
- Based on: The Miracle Worker by William Gibson
- Screenplay by: William Gibson
- Directed by: Paul Aaron
- Starring: Melissa Gilbert; Patty Duke; Charles Siebert; Stanley Wells; Diana Muldaur
- Music by: Billy Goldenberg
- Country of origin: United States
- Original language: English

Production
- Executive producers: Sandy Gallin; Raymond Katz
- Producer: Fred Coe
- Production locations: Big Sky Ranch - 4927 Bennett Road, Simi Valley, California
- Cinematography: Ted Voigtlander
- Editor: Gerald Lee Taylor
- Running time: 98 minutes
- Production company: Half-Pint Productions

Original release
- Network: NBC
- Release: October 14, 1979

The Miracle Worker is a 1979 American made-for-television biographical film based on the 1959 play of the same title by William Gibson, which originated as a 1957 broadcast of the television anthology series Playhouse 90. Gibson's original source material was The Story of My Life, the 1903 autobiography of Helen Keller. The play was adapted for the screen before, in 1962.

The film is based on the life of Helen Keller and Annie Sullivan's struggles to teaching her. It starred Patty Duke (who played Helen Keller in the original 1962 film, for which she won the Oscar) as Annie Sullivan and Melissa Gilbert as Helen Keller. It produced a TV sequel, Helen Keller: The Miracle Continues in 1984.

== Plot ==
Young Helen Keller, deafblind and mute since infancy, is in danger of being sent to an institution. Her inability to communicate has left her frustrated and violent. In desperation, her parents seek help from the Perkins Institute, which sends them a "half-blind Yankee schoolgirl" named Annie Sullivan to tutor their daughter. Through persistence and love, and sheer stubbornness, Annie breaks through Helen's walls of silence and darkness and teaches her to communicate.

== Cast ==
- Melissa Gilbert as Helen Keller
- Patty Duke as Annie Sullivan
- Charles Siebert as Captain Arthur H. Keller
- Diana Muldaur as Kate Adams Keller
- Stanley Wells as James Keller
- Anne Seymour as Aunt Evelyn
- Hilda Haynes as Viney
- Byron Green as Percy
- Noniece Williams as Martha
- Titos Vandis as Anagnos
- Jonathan Gilbert as voice of Jimmy Sullivan (Anne's younger brother who died in childhood while both were living at Tewksberry Hospital Almshouse).

== Production ==
Melissa Gilbert heavily campaigned Meredith Baxter to play Anne Sullivan.

Lynne Frederick, had expressed interest playing Anne Sullivan. Despite her lengthy and accomplished body of work, the producers told Frederick that she was "far too pretty" for the part.

Patty Duke, who played Anne Sullivan, won an Oscar for playing Helen Keller in the 1962 film.

== Awards and nominations ==
Year	Award	Category	Nominee(s)	Result	Ref.
1979	American Cinema Editors Awards	Best Edited Television Special	Gerald Lee Taylor	Nominated	
1980	Directors Guild of America Awards	Outstanding Directorial Achievement in Specials/Movies for TV/Actuality	Paul Aaron	Nominated	
1980	Golden Globe Awards	Best Television Film		Nominated	
1980	Primetime Emmy Awards	Outstanding Television Movie	Fred Coe, Sandy Gallin, and Raymond Katz	Won	
1980	Primetime Emmy Awards	Outstanding Lead Actress in a Limited Series or Movie	Patty Duke	Won	
1980	Primetime Emmy Awards	Outstanding Lead Actress in a Limited Series or Movie	Melissa Gilbert	Nominated	
1980	Primetime Emmy Awards	Outstanding Cinematography for a Limited Series or Movie	Ted Voigtlander	Nominated	
1980	Primetime Emmy Awards	Outstanding Hairstyling	Larry Germain and Donna Barrett Gilbert	Won	

== See also ==
- The Miracle Worker (2000 film)
- Black (2005 film)
- List of films featuring the deaf and hard of hearing
