= A Different Story =

1978 film

- A Different Story film poster
- Directed by: Paul Aaron
- Written by: Henry Olek
- Produced by: Alan Belkin
- Starring: Meg Foster; Perry King; Valerie Curtin; Peter Donat
- Cinematography: Philip H. Lathrop
- Edited by: Lynn McCallon
- Music by: David Frank
- Production companies: Petersen Films; Mar Vista Productions
- Distributed by: AVCO Embassy Pictures
- Release date: May 10, 1978
- Running time: 108 minutes
- Country: United States
- Language: English

A Different Story is a 1978 American film directed by Paul Aaron and starring Meg Foster and Perry King. Set in Los Angeles, it tells the story of a gay man (King) and a lesbian (Foster) who become temporary housemates but end up falling in love with each other.

== Plot ==
Albert is the chauffeur and lover for a wealthy pianist, Sills. When Sills finds another chauffeur/lover, Albert is forced onto the streets of Los Angeles. Stella is a real estate agent who knows Sills and Albert as repeated rental clients. She finds Albert squatting in one of her properties and she offers Albert to spend the night at her house on the couch. The next day, she goes to work, expecting Albert to move out, but instead Albert cleans her cluttered house and cooks a fantastic dinner. Without verbally acknowledging it, they agree that Albert can stay longer and perform domestic duties while Stella continues working. Albert also gets a part-time job as a valet.

The next night, Stella has a date with Chris. Only when the two of them kiss does Albert realize Stella is a lesbian. Chris spends the night. In the middle of the night, Phyllis, another lover of Stella, storms into the house and finds Stella in bed with Chris. Stella apologizes to Phyllis and they do not break off their relationship. In the meantime, Albert has found a new lover, Roger, that he met at the baths. Though they continue their separate homosexual relationships, Stella and Albert find that they enjoy spending more time with each other than anyone else. Stella's parents visit one day and come under the impression that she and Albert are dating.

One day, immigration agents arrive asking for Albert, who is an illegal alien from Belgium. Stella marries him to prevent his deportation. On Albert's birthday, when they are both drunk, they have sex for the first time and enjoy it. From then on, they sleep in the same bed and begin acting like a heterosexual married couple. Stella becomes pregnant and eventually tells Phyllis, who has been distraught about how infrequently she sees Stella. Phyllis becomes suicidal, so Stella and Albert break into her apartment and find her with a gun. She threatens to kill Stella and fires, but the gun is not loaded. Phyllis bursts into tears.

Later the baby is born and they move into a new house. Albert begins a job as an apprentice fashion designer and Stella puts her job on hold to raise the baby. Stella becomes jealous that Albert may be having a homosexual affair with his boss, Ned. She sneaks into Albert's workplace late one evening after an office party and finds Albert naked in the shower not with Ned, but with a female model. Stella moves out of their home with the baby and threatens a divorce. Albert tries to apologize numerous times and gives one final try when Stella is showing a property to a client. When she doesn't accept him again, he drives away. She changes her mind, but before she can say anything, he crashes his motorcycle into a tree. She runs over, full of tears, but he is not seriously hurt.

== Cast ==
- Meg Foster as Stella Cooke
- Perry King as Albert Walreavens
- Valerie Curtin as Phyllis
- Peter Donat as Sills
- Richard Bull as Mr. Cooke
- Barbara Collentine as Mrs. Cooke
- Guerin Barry as Ned
- Doug Higgins as Roger
- Lisa James as Chris
- Burke Byrnes as Richard II

== Reception ==
=== Film critics ===
Critical reception varied from mixed to negative, with a general consensus that the forced and formulaic ending countered whatever appeal existed in the first half of the film.

Janet Maslin of The New York Times lauded Meg Foster's "aggressive vitality" but ultimately found the movie seriously flawed: "Mr. Aaron's ineptitude knows no bounds, especially when it comes to blasting an insufferable score, ending scenes at uninteresting moments, and making the film's chronology completely obscure." Gene Siskel of the Chicago Tribune gave the film two stars out of four and called it "patronizing," because the film "pretends to like its characters' sexual preferences, but really it snickers at them."

Arthur D. Murphy of Variety called it "a first class production whose only — but serious — flaw is a Henry Olek script that begins with brilliant cleverness but dissolves by fadeout into formula banality." Charles Champlin of the Los Angeles Times wrote that "until the sitcom formulations take over at the end, 'A Different Story' derives its humor and its warmth from carefully observed, and very well and sympathetically enacted characters, operating in a milieu which is also carefully but not always sympathetically observed."

Gary Arnold of The Washington Post called it "a trifle with redeeming personality appeal and a genuinely affectionate temperament. As the supposedly disparate lovers, Perry King and Meg Foster make an overwhelmingly attractive and compatible couple, and their sexual rapport is enhanced by Paul Aaron's attentive, straightforward direction." Writing in the Seattle Gay News, Bill Alpert wrote that "it's a real surprise that A Different Story is as rotten a film as it is. This cheap bit of exploitation insults more than it instructs by combining a pointless and underdeveloped plot with an unending selection of homosexual stereotypes I thought were long since consigned to the trash heap ... Particularly offensive is the unbelievable — and undocumented — contention that homosexuality is some sort of adolescent aberration that a drunken roll in the hay will cure."

Scott Meek wrote in The Monthly Film Bulletin, "Despite the initial liberal façade with which it presents the central couple's homosexuality, the script remains problematic in its attitudes to homosexuality and heterosexuality, both of which can be seen as unsatisfactory elements in the characters' relationships ... Ultimately, the 'difference' of the story looks like an attempt to be all things (sexually, as it were) to all people, and as such likely to please very few."

Time Out Film Guide derides A Different Story as a "glossily persuasive film which presents its 'real' gays as neurotics or gangsters, and offers us so many clichés about role reversal, marriage and pregnancy that it makes An Unmarried Woman look like an intelligent study of divorce."

=== Gay rights groups ===
Some gay rights groups protested the stereotyped depiction of homosexuals in the film and their ability to convert to heterosexuality. Gay Activists Alliance circulated a letter speaking out against the film. Gay Left, a journal of gay rights and socialism, criticized A Different Story as another example of the gay films of the late 1970s which presented stereotyped homosexuals. "It often seems that the wider the commercial audience appeal is meant to be, the more objectionable are the gay characters and relationships portrayed. The superficially 'liberal' approach of a film such as A Different Story is ultimately just as negative about gay sexuality." Janet Maslin's original review elaborates: "The movie's use of [Albert and Stella's] homosexuality is indeed exploitative, insensitive, and offensive in a variety of ways. Even worse, it is unconvincing ... Albert's homosexuality is nothing but a gimmick, something for the screenplay to coax him out of."

== Home media ==
During its initial ownership by Embassy Pictures, the movie was released on VHS multiple times, first by Magnetic Video in 1979, later from Embassy Home Entertainment in 1985. When its rights shifted to Mar Vista Productions, it made its DVD debut through Trinity Home Entertainment on July 25, 2006. Scorpion Releasing issued a Blu-ray edition in 2018.

== See also ==
- List of lesbian, gay, bisexual or transgender-related films
