= Maxie (1985 film) =

1985 film by Paul Aaron

- Theatrical release poster
- Directed by: Paul Aaron
- Written by: Patricia Resnick
- Based on: Marion's Wall by Jack Finney
- Produced by: Carter DeHaven
- Starring: Glenn Close; Mandy Patinkin; Ruth Gordon; Barnard Hughes; Valerie Curtin
- Cinematography: Fred Schuler
- Edited by: Lynzee Klingman
- Music by: Georges Delerue
- Production company: Aurora Productions
- Distributed by: Orion Pictures
- Release date: September 27, 1985
- Running time: 98 minutes
- Country: United States
- Language: English
- Budget: $7 million
- Box office: $2,564,278

Maxie is a 1985 American fantasy comedy film directed by Paul Aaron, and starring Glenn Close, Mandy Patinkin, Valerie Curtin, Ruth Gordon and Barnard Hughes. The plot is based on the novel Marion's Wall (1973) by Jack Finney about a woman who is possessed by a very outgoing female ghost — a budding actress from the 1920s — named Maxie, who wants to fulfill her destiny. The character of Maxie is seen very briefly, using archival footage of Carole Lombard.

== Plot ==
When husband Nick Chaney and his wife Jan, somewhat staid and socially stifled, move into an old apartment house in San Francisco, they uncover a message under layers of wallpaper left by a previous tenant ("Maxie Malone lived here! Read it, and weep!").

The crazy landlady from upstairs is overwhelmed when she sees the message and tells them about an actress, Maxie Malone, who lived there in the 1920s. Maxie was a brash, young party girl who died in a car crash the morning before her big audition for a Hollywood studio.

Her only movie legacy, mere minutes on film, is dug up by Nick who watches it with Jan, who goes to bed right afterwards. Nick is also headed to bed, but he is stopped by a voice which tells him to play the piece again. He thinks that it is Jan at first, but the voice materializes partially in front of him as Maxie and he plays the piece again for her. Then Maxie disappears and Nick goes to bed, dismissing the incident as a psychotic episode.

The next day at work, Nick's boss (who has romantic designs on him) invites him and Jan to a party. Jan is nervous about the high society bash when Nick agrees to attend, but Maxie (who has inserted her soul into Jan's body) behaves rather differently from Jan. "Jan" gets drunk, dances seductively, and sings a vamp version of "Bye Bye Blackbird" draped over the piano, flirting with every male there. Drunk, Maxie and Nick break into an amusement park and make out on a merry-go-round, only to be caught by a policeman, who lets them go after Nick makes up an excuse.

Somehow this otherworldly possession must end, so that Jan can resume her own life. The solution lies in an audition for the lead in a new film production of Cleopatra. Paired with actor Harry Hamlin (as himself), "Jan" dazzles everyone when Maxie takes over the role. A successful actress at last, Maxie moves on in the afterlife. She leaves Jan freer and happier, comfortable in expressing her own sexuality, thanks to sharing Maxie's irrepressible feminine spirit.

== Cast ==
- Glenn Close as Jan Chaney / Maxie Malone
- Mandy Patinkin as Nick Chaney
- Ruth Gordon as Mrs. Lavin
- Barnard Hughes as Bishop Campbell
- Valerie Curtin as Miss Sheffer
- Googy Gress as Father Jerome
- Michael Ensign as Cleopatra Director
- Lou Cutell as Art Isenberg
- Michael Laskin as Commercial Director
- Nelson Welch as Bartender
- Leeza Gibbons as E.T. Reporter
- Harry Hamlin as Himself

== Production ==
The novel was published in 1973. (It was later adapted into a 1997 musical, Maddie.)

In 1978 film rights were in the control of Meredith MacRae who wanted to produce a feature version. By the end of the decade film rights were in the hands of Paul Aaron who spent six years developing it.

Filming began in October 1984 under the title Free Spirit. Location work took place in San Francisco.

Glenn Close and Mandy Patinkin were both coming off Broadway successes when they made the film (The Real Thing and Sunday in the Park with George). "This is the hardest thing I've ever had to do," said Close.

The surviving film clip of Maxie is that of Carole Lombard from The Campus Vamp (1928). The ending of the film differs from the novel where the audition was of a nude scene; the film changes this to a scene similar to one in Cleopatra (1963) where Jan wears a metal snake brassiere in homage to Theda Bara in the 1917 version of the film.

== Awards ==
Academy of Science Fiction, Fantasy and Horror Films, USA

- 1986, Glenn Close was nominated for the Golden Globe Award for Best Actress
- 1986, Ruth Gordon was nominated for the Saturn Award for Best Supporting Actress

Brussels International Fantastic Film Festival

- 1986, Paul Aaron won the Silver Raven

Fantasporto

- 1987, Maxie was nominated for the Best Film Award International Fantasy Film Award for Best Film

== Critical response ==
On the review aggregator website Rotten Tomatoes, 0% of 9 critics' reviews are positive, with an average rating of 2.9/10.

Critic Roger Ebert, in a review dated September 27, 1985, wrote, "...if Maxie had any brains, she would appear in Jan's body, take one look at the script, and decide she was better off dead."

== See also ==
- List of ghost films
