= Viveka Davis =

American actress

- Born: August 19, 1969 (age 56); Santa Monica, California, U.S.
- Occupation: Actress
- Years active: 1982–2001

Viveka Davis (born August 19, 1969) is a retired American actress who has starred in television series and films. As a young actress, she was best known for her role in the 1983 NBC TV miniseries V as Polly Maxwell, a role she reprised in the 1984 sequel V: The Final Battle.

== Career ==
Davis's first film role was in the 1982 drama film Shoot the Moon, playing the daughter of Albert Finney and Diane Keaton. As a teen, her best-known film role was in the 1987 comedy Morgan Stewart's Coming Home. At age 16, she starred in dual roles in Disney's 1987 TV film Student Exchange. In 1995, she starred as country-singing legend Wynonna Judd in NBC TV miniseries Naomi & Wynonna: Love Can Build a Bridge. She made guest appearances on TV series, including Knots Landing, Seinfeld, ER, Nash Bridges, Strong Medicine, and Touched by an Angel.

== Filmography ==
Year	Title	Role	Notes
1982	Shoot the Moon	Jill Dunlap	
1982	Knots Landing	Cricket	TV series
1983	Jennifer Slept Here	-	TV series
1983	V	Polly Maxwell	TV miniseries
1984	V (The Final Battle)	Polly Maxwell	TV miniseries
1985	Not My Kid	Susan Bower	TV movie
1987	Morgan Stewart's Coming Home	Emily Casella	
1987	Student Exchange	Carole Whitcomb/Simone Soiret	TV movie
1988	The Charmings	Amy	TV series
1989	Forbidden Sun	Jane	
1990	The End of Innocence	Honey	
1991	Ricochet	Debbie	
1991	Curly Sue	Trina	
1991	Good Sports	Risa Braun	TV series
1992	Man Trouble	June Huff	
1993	Body Shot	Rita	
1993	I Can Make You Love Me	Mary Ann	TV movie
1993	A Dangerous Woman	Mercy	
1994	PCU	Womynist #1	
1995	Naomi & Wynonna: Love Can Build a Bridge	Wynonna Judd	
1997	NYPD Blue	Margo	Episode: "Remembrance of Humps Past" (S5 ep11)
1999	My Last Love	Kate	TV movie
1999	Message in a Bottle	Alva	
1999	EDtv	Marcia	
1999	Swallows	Magdalena	
2000	Timecode	Victoria Cohen	
2000	Lost in the Pershing Point Hotel	Debutante #1	
2000	Cast Away	Pilot Gwen	
2001	On Edge	Patsy Cain	
