= Darrell Fetty =

American actor

- Born: Milton, West Virginia, U.S.
- Education: Marshall University
- Occupations: Screenwriter, actor, singer, producer
- Years active: 1974–present
- Spouse(s): Carolyne McCoy (divorced); Joyce Ingalls (1984–2015; her death)

Darrell Fetty is an American actor, screenwriter, and producer. He was nominated for an Emmy Award for his work on the History miniseries Hatfields & McCoys which has received a total of 16 nominations. He resides in Los Angeles, California, and continues to work in film, television, and theater.

== Early life ==
Darrell Fetty was born in Milton, West Virginia and attended one of the last one-room schoolhouses in America at Ball's Gap, West Virginia. He graduated from Milton High School and Marshall University, both located in West Virginia. As a kid, he got his first role in a church play with his parents. He started piano lessons in the third grade, and, a couple of years later, began playing for the church choir. In his teens, Fetty put several rock bands together. With the help of his guitarist friend Yancey Burns, he formed The Satisfied Minds and they released one single on Plato Records.

== Career ==
=== TV and film career ===
Moving to Los Angeles after college graduation, Fetty landed his first role on the then-popular high school drama Room 222 and began acting regularly in television and feature films. His TV appearances include guest-starring roles on Happy Days, Starsky & Hutch, Barnaby Jones, The Facts of Life, One Day at a Time, Eight is Enough, Kojak, The Streets of San Francisco, thirtysomething, CHiPs, Knots Landing, The Gangster Chronicles, Centennial and Hawaii 5-0. Among his theatrical movies were featured roles in Stunts and Blood Beach. Fetty co-starred in the John Milius films Big Wednesday as a surfer called "Waxer" and in The Wind and the Lion as a bumbling junior diplomat. He played Donald Haines in the 2017 TV film Dating Game Killer.

=== Writing ===
During the early days of his acting career, Darrell Fetty supplemented his income as a Story Analyst, reviewing screenplays for studios and independent producers, starting at American International Pictures for the legendary Sam Arkoff. At this time Fetty was also writing music videos for MTV, working with young directors for such artists as The Ramones and Jefferson Starship. He wrote a number of independent features including Freeway and Trouble Bound, co-written with Francis Delia; State Park (under the pseudonym "Neal M. Noble"), and Into The Fire (as "Jesse Ballard") and worked extensively in feature development for most of the major studios with such producers as Don Simpson, Jerry Bruckheimer, and John Milius. In the late 1990s, he began working full-time as a writer/producer for TV shows, beginning as a staff writer on NBC's Viper, created by Danny Bilson and Paul DeMeo. Fetty's other series work include The Sentinel, Silk Stalkings, Hercules: The Legendary Journeys, Pensacola: Wings of Gold, and Mutant X.

== Personal life ==
Darrell Fetty first married Carolyne McCoy, who is a descendant of the famous feuding families (her mother was a Hatfield, her father a McCoy).

Fetty married his second wife, former model turned actress Joyce Ingalls, at a ceremony at the Little Brown Church in Studio City in 1984. The couple oversaw the Little Brown Church's homeless ministry and operated the church food pantry, now called the Darrell and Joyce Fetty Food Pantry, for nearly 25 years. Their food pantry is estimated to have served thousands of families. They have two children. Joyce Ingalls died on August 5, 2015, at the age of 65.

Darrell Fetty is a close friend of writer/director John Milius, whom he considers a mentor and major influence in his career.
