= Student Exchange =

1987 television film

- Print advertisement
- Genre: Comedy; Family
- Written by: William Davies; Debra Frankel; William Osborne
- Directed by: Mollie Miller
- Starring: Viveka Davis; Todd Field; Mitchell Anderson; Heather Graham; Maura Tierney; Gavin MacLeod; Lisa Hartman; O. J. Simpson; Lindsay Wagner
- Music by: Phil Marshall
- Country of origin: United States
- Original language: English

Production
- Producer: Charles Milhaupt
- Cinematography: Fred J. Koenekamp
- Editors: Paul Dixon; John Woodcock
- Running time: 88 minutes
- Production company: Walt Disney Television

Original release
- Network: ABC
- Release: November 29 – December 6, 1987

Student Exchange is a 1987 American two-part made-for-television comedy film directed by Mollie Miller and produced by Walt Disney Television. It originally aired November 29, 1987 and December 6, 1987 as a presentation of The Disney Sunday Movie on ABC.

== Plot ==
Carole and Neil, two nerdy teenagers, get only perfect grades but have no social skills. When Carole learns that two foreign exchange students from France and Italy have gone to another school, they grab their chance and dress up as the exchange students. For their last semester, they see a fresh start to become popular as the Italian Adriano and French Simone. But for how long can the scheme go on?

== Cast ==
- Viveka Davis as Carole Whitcomb / Simone Swaare
- Todd Field as Neil Barton / Adriano Parbritzzi
- Maura Tierney as Kathy Maltby
- Gavin MacLeod as Vice Principal Durfner
- Mitchell Anderson as Rod
- Heather Graham as Dorrie Ryder
- Kim Walker as Kit
- Lee Garlington as Mrs. Whitcomb
- David Selburg as Mr. Whitcomb
- Nancy Lenehan as Mrs. Barton
- Glenn Shadix as Mr. Barton
- Virginya Keehne as Lucy Whitcomb
- Lisa Hartman as Peggy Whitcomb
- Nancy Fish as Mrs. Vera
- Edward Edwards as Mr. Gordon
- Rob Estes as Beach
- Moon Unit Zappa as Biker Joe
- O. J. Simpson as Soccer Coach
- Lindsay Wagner as Principal

== Release ==
=== Home media ===
Disney released a DVD-on-Demand version of the film as part of their "Disney Generations Collection" line of DVDs on June 26, 2011.

== Reception ==
On Rotten Tomatoes there is no critic consensus but audience reactions were favorable.
