= Valerie Curtin =

American actress and screenwriter

- Born: March 31, 1945 (age 81); Jackson Heights, New York, U.S.
- Occupations: Actress, screenwriter
- Spouse: Barry Levinson (m. 1975; div. 1982)
- Relatives: Jane Curtin (cousin)

Valerie Curtin (born March 31, 1945) is an American actress and screenwriter.

== Personal life ==
Curtin was born in Jackson Heights, New York, on March 31, 1945, the daughter of radio actor Joseph Curtin. She attended Lake Erie College.

She is a paternal cousin of TV comedian/actress Jane Curtin.

== Career ==
Curtin performed with comedy groups and acted in theatrical productions in New York before going to Los Angeles in 1971. There, she was a member of The Committee, a comedy group.

Curtin began her writing career in the 1970s working on episodes of the television sitcom The Mary Tyler Moore Show. Curtin and her then-husband Barry Levinson were nominated for an Academy Award (in the category of Best Writing, Screenplay Written Directly for the Screen) for ...And Justice for All (1979) starring Al Pacino. They also co-wrote the semi-autobiographical Best Friends (1982), which starred Burt Reynolds and Goldie Hawn.

Curtin's acting career has run concurrently with her writing career. During the 1970s, she made various guest appearances on television in shows such as Happy Days; Welcome Back, Kotter; Rhoda; The Rockford Files; and Barney Miller. In March 1976, ABC shot the pilot episode for Three's Company, in which Curtin appeared alongside John Ritter and Susanne Zenor. Curtin played a character named Jenny, who eventually became Janet Wood, played by Joyce DeWitt.

Her movie appearances include Alice Doesn't Live Here Anymore (her first movie appearance, 1974), All the President's Men, Silver Streak, and Silent Movie (all 1976), Why Would I Lie? (1980), as well as Maxie (1985) and John Cassavetes' final film, the 1986 comedy Big Trouble, plus a small, uncredited role in Best Friends.

In 1982, Curtin was given the role of Judy Bernly in the television sitcom 9 to 5 based on the 1980 movie of the same name. Her character was portrayed by Jane Fonda in the film version. Curtin was dropped from the show after two seasons, when James Komack came on as the new executive producer, replacing the team led by Jane Fonda. However, Curtin returned for a syndicated version of 9 to 5 (1986–1988), reprising her earlier role; the new version was successful. In the 1980s and 1990s, her writing credits included mainstream films such as Inside Moves (1980), the 1984 remake of Unfaithfully Yours, and Toys (1992).

Curtin has also guest-starred in shows such as Frasier, Party of Five, Becker, The District, Just Shoot Me, and ER.

== Selected filmography ==
Year	Title	Role	Notes
1974	Alice Doesn't Live Here Anymore	Vera	
1976	All the President's Men	Miss Milland	
1976	Mother, Jugs & Speed	Naomi Fishbine	
1976	Silent Movie	Intensive Care Nurse	
1976	Silver Streak	Plain Jane	
1977	The Great Smokey Roadblock	Mary Agnes	
1978	Rabbit Test	Pashima	
1978	A Different Story	Phyllis	
1980	Why Would I Lie?	Mrs. Bok	
1982	Best Friends	Paula's Friend in Playpen	Uncredited, also co-screenwriter
1985	Maxie	Miss Sheffer	
1986	Down and Out in Beverly Hills	Pearl Waxman	
1986	Big Trouble	Arlene Hoffman	
