= Terry Winsor =

British film director

Terry Winsor is a British film director who has worked with such stars as Richard Harris, Sean Bean and Tom Wilkinson. He has directed a number of films and TV programs, as well as a video game.

== Filmography ==
- Party Party (1983)
- Lubo's World (1984)
- Morgan Stewart's Coming Home (1987)
- Fool's Gold: The Story of the Brink's Mat Robbery (1992)
- The Magician (1993)
- The Great Kandinsky (1995)
- Thief Takers (1996) (TV)
- Essex Boys (2000)
- Hot Money (2001) (TV)
- Rock Face (2002) (TV)

== Games ==
- ToCA Race Driver 3 (2006)
