= Long Gone (film) =

1987 television film directed by Martin Davidson

- DVD cover
- Genre: Comedy; Drama; Romance; Sports
- Based on: Long Gone by Paul Hemphill
- Screenplay by: Michael Norell
- Directed by: Martin Davidson
- Starring: William Petersen; Virginia Madsen; Dermot Mulroney; Larry Riley; Katy Boyer
- Theme music composer: Phillip Namanworth; Kenny Vance
- Original language: English

Production
- Producer: Joan Barnett
- Cinematography: Robert Elswit
- Editor: Gib Jaffe
- Running time: 113 minutes
- Production company: HBO Pictures

Original release
- Network: HBO
- Release: May 23, 1987

Long Gone is a 1987 baseball film by HBO that is based on Paul Hemphill's 1979 book of the same name. The television film was directed by Martin Davidson and starred William Petersen, Virginia Madsen, and Dermot Mulroney. Historic McKechnie Field, located in Bradenton, Florida, was the location for many of the film's scenes. Outside North America, the film was released as Stogies.

== Plot ==
The Tampico Stogies are a last-place baseball team based in Tampico, Florida. The team competes in the lowest-level (Class D) professional Gulf Coast league during the summer of 1957. The team is unaffiliated with a major league franchise; so, it must sign and pay all of its own players without any financial support outside of the team's owners.

The Stogies are owned by a pair of corrupt and scheming local Tampico businessmen, Hale Buchman and his son, Hale Buchman Jr. They refer to themselves as sports moguls, despite the team being heavily mortgaged.

Their best player and manager is an aging Cecil "Stud" Cantrell, a hard-drinking, hard-playing, and hard-loving man. Signed out of high school by the St. Louis Cardinals, Cantrell was a rookie standout in the organization, coming up in the same group as Stan Musial, but he never made it to the big leagues because of a war injury he sustained in World War II during the Battle of Guadalcanal.

At a game against the Crestview Cats in Alabama, Cantrell meets a beautiful young woman just voted Miss Strawberry Blossom of 1957, Dixie Lee Boxx, botching the lyrics of the Star-Spangled Banner, but still wowing the crowd in her skimpy skin-tight outfit. What Cantrell initially intends to be a one-night stand soon develops into a semi-serious relationship.

Cantrell signs a slick-fielding but light-hitting second baseman named Jamie Don Weeks, fresh out of high school. Weeks soon falls for a virginal and church-going local girl, Esther Wrenn, who is looking to escape Tampico. Cantrell also signs a power-hitting, strong-armed catcher, Joe Brown, who is African American. Because this is the Deep South during the 1950s, to keep local bigots and Ku Klux Klan off his back, Cantrell lies that Brown is a Venezuelan named José Luis Brown who can't speak any English.

With the addition of these new players, the Stogies go on a red-hot winning streak. On the verge of a pennant, however, Cantrell is told that throwing the big game would give a substantial boost to his sagging career. He is offered a managerial position in the minor leagues with the Cardinals organization, on the condition he does not show up for the final game. If he plays, his future managerial career is over.

Brown, poverty-stricken since childhood, is also bribed not to play (with the promise of a fancy car). The team's owners, the Buchmans, are involved in the match-fixing as well. They set up a trivial yet undeniable scandal in which Cantrell could be implicated in betting on his team's games (for $1.00 per game), giving them leverage by which they can threaten to have him suspended for life.

While the pennant-deciding game is being played at Tampico, Cantrell and Brown meet at a local bar where they discuss their moral and ethical dilemmas. Brown erupts in anger, smashing his new car with his baseball bat.

They elect to hurry to the park and play, much to the anger and regret of the owners. Cantrell instructs the PA announcer to introduce Brown by his actual name, Joe Louis Brown, revealing his true ethnicity as African-American.

Seeing Cantrell on the field, the Cardinals' owners visibly tear up Cantrell's contract with their organization. Thanks to the involvement of Cantrell and Brown, the Stogies win the game and the pennant. Even though the Buchmans are complicit in the game-fixing scheme, they are swept up in the crowd excitement and join in the celebration.

Cantrell confesses to Dixie that he doesn't know if he has a future in baseball, and proposes marriage. The film ends with the Stogies hosting a double wedding — Cantrell marrying Dixie and Jamie marrying Esther.

== Cast ==
- William Petersen as Cecil "Stud" Cantrell
- Virginia Madsen as Dixie Lee Boxx
- Dermot Mulroney as Jamie Don Weeks
- Katy Boyer as Esther Caroline Wrenn
- Larry Riley as Joe Louis "Jose" Brown
- Henry Gibson as Hale Buchman
- Teller as Hale "Junior" Buchman Jr.
- Robert Easton as Cletis Ramey
- Joel Murray as Bart Polanski
- Panchito Gómez as Paco Izquierdo
- David Langston Smyrl as Monroe Wright
- Guich Koock as "Bump" Klein
- Arthur Rosenburg as "Peaches" Cluff
- Will Zahrn as "Knucksie" Chappell
- Edward Blatchford as "Whiz" Whsonant
- Steve Zurk as Buster Smerglia
- Kenneth Eriksen as "Bubba" Bean
- Neil DeGroot as "Pukey" Smathers
- Ken Dominguez as "Corky" Lucadello
- Mike McKown as "Scooter" Cagle
- Nardi Contreras as "Hose" Harrigan
- John Bauldrey as Tommy Tatum
- Ken Krannick as Rook Robb
- Kathryn Hasty as Bonnie
- Tracy Roberts as "Redhead"
- Hazen Gifford as J. Harrell Smythe
- William Wohrman as "Whitey" Connerly
- Tony Vila Jr. as "Dusty" Hoolihan
- Jim Rabe as "Rusty" Ledbetter
- Ronn Allen as Mr. Wrenn
- Monica Moran as Mrs. Wrenn

== Production ==
Several scenes were done in the Silver Ring Cafe in Ybor City, Tampa, Florida.

== Reception and home media ==
Released in 1987 by HBO, Long Gone is a little-known and difficult-to-obtain film which has become somewhat of a sports cult film. It has been described as "three parts Bull Durham, two parts Slap Shot, add a dose of Bingo Long and a pinch of The Longest Yard". It has also been described as the best baseball movie most of you never saw.

A book, The Baseball Filmography, 1915 Through 2001, described Long Gone as one of the most thoroughly enjoyable baseball comedies made in the last two decades. Robert Creamer, a writer for Sports Illustrated, wrote that it was probably the best made-for-television movie he had ever seen.

John O'Connor, a writer for The New York Times, wrote that Long Gone makes classics such as The Pride of the Yankees look like promotional fantasies. Bleacher Report wrote that this film deserves to be included in anyone's collection of baseball features. Newsday called it one of the best sports movies ever made. Long Gone was ranked 50th in The Ultimate Book of Sports Movies: Featuring the 100 Greatest Sports Films. It also rated a mention in another book, The Great Baseball Films, which stated Long Gone was an above-average comedy-drama that is full of bite, grit, and good feelings.

Long Gone was released on VHS and laserdisc by Lorimar Home Video. In 1994, Warner Home Video re-reissued it on VHS. However, Long Gone has never been released on DVD, Blu-ray or on any streaming platform (as of September 2023).

== Awards ==
- Director Martin Davidson won an ACE Award for the film under the category Best Directing of a Movie or Miniseries.

== See also ==
- List of baseball films
