= Paul Mace =

American film, stage and television actor

- Mace in The Rockford Files, 1979
- Born: Paul Nicholas Mace; April 4, 1950; New York, U.S.
- Died: August 12, 1983 (aged 33); North Hollywood, California, U.S.
- Occupations: Film, stage and television actor
- Spouse: Sara Mace
- Children: 2

Paul Nicholas Mace (April 4, 1950 – August 12, 1983) was an American film, stage and television actor. He was best known for playing Wimpy Murgalo in the 1974 film The Lords of Flatbush.

== Early life and career ==
Paul was born in New York City, the only child of aspiring classical pianist Marcelle Marie Skinner and vocal coach Giovanni Carmine Mace. Disclosure of her husband's then closeted homosexuality, coupled with his growing relationship with soon-to-be life partner Richard Adrian Dorr, led to their subsequent divorce, following which Mace, with Skinner's consent, retained custody of their sole offspring.

Mace began his career in 1958, with the Metropolitan Opera Boys Chorus, appearing two years later in the stage play Semi-Detached. He appeared in such other plays as Midgie Purvis, The Wall, Zoot Suit and The Me Nobody Knows. He then began his screen career in 1962, appearing in the anthology television series The United States Steel Hour. In 1970, he played the recurring role of Luke in the CBS soap opera television series Search for Tomorrow.

Later in his career, Mace guest-starred in television programs including East Side West Side, The Rockford Files and CHiPs, and played the recurring role of Pagano, the street lord in the NBC police procedural television series Hill Street Blues. In 1974, he starred as Wimpy Murgalo in the film The Lords of Flatbush, starring along with Sylvester Stallone, Perry King and Henry Winkler. He also appeared in films such as The Panic in Needle Park and Paradise Alley.

Mace retired from acting in 1982, last appearing in the NBC medical drama television series St. Elsewhere.

== Personal life and death ==
Mace was married to Sara. They had two children. Their marriage lasted until Mace's death in 1983.

On August 12, 1983, Mace died in a motorcycle accident near his house in North Hollywood, California, at the age of 33.
