= Party Party (film) =

1983 British film

- Video cover
- Directed by: Terry Winsor
- Written by: Daniel Peacock
- Starring: Karl Howman; Caroline Quentin; Daniel Peacock; Gary Olsen; Nick Berry
- Release date: 1983
- Running time: 90 minutes
- Country: United Kingdom
- Language: English
- Budget: £500,000

Party Party is a 1983 British comedy directed by Terry Winsor, which follows three friends - Larry, Johnny, and Toby - as they throw a New Year's Eve party while Larry's parents are away at the local vicarage dance. The film playfully explores the interpersonal and romantic relationships of many of the characters at the eponymous party.

The film was based on a student short by Winsor, who teamed up with cast member Daniel Peacock to expand the script.

== Plot ==
On New Year's Eve, Johnny Reeve and his friend, Toby are out cruising in North-West London, being followed by three quasi-threatening motorcyclists. At the same time, Larry is at Mass with his parents. Just after "Mum" and the Vicar begin bemoaning the nuisance that the motorcyclists make, Johnny and Toby pick up Larry from the front of the church and plan to throw a party at Larry's while his parents are away.

Meanwhile, at the police station's gymnasium, Rebecca is sparring with Sam. Out in the squad bay, the sergeant tells them they are not to break up any of the local parties.

Larry fakes illness so that he does not have to go with his parents. Toby shows up early and almost blows it by talking about the party in front of Mum and Dad. Once the parents leave, Larry and Toby begin preparing for the guests.

The rest of the film takes place at the party. Larry is shocked to see Sharon engaged to Tony and keeps trying to spirit her away for a "last fling." Rebecca and Johnny keep using others to get a reaction out of each other, including Sam and Bobby. Toby unsuccessfully tries to connect with any female. Shirley is so distraught by her failed attempts to connect with any guy, she plans on drowning herself in the bath tub. Sonya tries to get Tony back. Brenda pursues Sam to no avail until it's clear that Rebecca really doesn't fancy him. Terry succeeds in getting blotto, or "paralytic."

Leading up to the climax, Terry and Shirley hit it off in a full bathtub and Bobby calls Brenda a slag. When Toby defends her honour, Bobby starts to get ready to beat Toby up. Johnny clears everyone out of the kitchen and locks the door leaving Toby alone with Bobby. While Sam and other men cowardly leave Toby in the lurch, Johnny circles back through the back door and sucker punches Bobby, knocking him out. With a wink to Toby, he leaves through the back door. Toby realizes his opportunity after a moment and stages a brawl with appropriate sound effects so that when the others burst in, he is holding his hand and giving the impression that he knocked Bobby out. Now the hero for standing up for her honour, Toby finds himself the object of Brenda's affection. Johnny and Rebecca connect. Shirley and Terry connect. Larry almost connects with Sharon when he is interrupted by Tony and Sonya. Hypocritically, Tony then breaks his engagement with Sharon and goes back to Sonya.

Larry's parents arrive home to find the house in disarray. The film ends with the characters singing a rendition of Auld Lang Syne" by Chas & Dave as they dance in a New Year's circle.

== Cast ==
- Daniel Peacock – Toby, the sad sack of the trio, who has a huge crush on Brenda
- Karl Howman – Johnny Reeve, the operator and ladies' man who is on the prowl
- Perry Fenwick – Larry, the organizer of the party who was expecting to have it off with his sometime girlfriend Sharon
- Sean Chapman – Sam Diggins, a police constable (PC) who has a thing for Rebecca yet also flirts with Brenda
- Phoebe Nicholls – Rebecca, a PC who likes toying with Sam and Bobby but has a thing for Johnny
- Gary Olsen – Terry, a PC who wants to get so drunk that he is "paralytic" and can forget his ex-girlfriend after their three-year relationship just ended
- Clive Mantle – Bobby, a physically large neighborhood bully who was arrested by Rebecca a week prior for brawling in the streets, likes bragging about fighting
- Caroline Quentin – Shirley, a cute, plump, brunette, and sensitive girl who has yet to have a serious boyfriend and is best mates with Brenda
- Kim Thomson – Brenda, a cute, thin, and blonde girl, best mate of Shirley, has a thing for Sam and the organist at the church
- Kate Williams – Mum, who has to put up with a husband with a wandering eye
- Ken Farrington – Dad, who has a collection of porn in the pottery shed and flirts blatantly with other women at each New Year's Eve party
- Philip Martin Brown – Tony, a lesser mate of Larry's who used to date Sonya, but just got engaged to Sharon
- Annabel Mednick – Sonya, Tony's ex-girlfriend who wants him back
- Sallyanne Law – Sharon, Larry's former sometime girlfriend who is now engaged to Tony
- Sarah London – Sally
- Paul Mari – Phil
- Harvey Hillyer – Den
- Michele Winstanley – Christine
- Peter Lovstrom – Steve
- Robin Hayter – Pete
- Debby Bishop – Skirts (as Debbie Bishop)
- Nick Berry – Ralph
- Ann Somers – Ralph's Girl
- Sharon Maiden – Steph
- Geoffrey Drew – Vicar
- Graham Weston – Sergeant
- Pat Ashton – Johnny's Mum

== Production ==
After being impressed by his brief appearance in the 1979 film Quadrophenia, Terry Winsor reached out to Daniel Peacock to ask if he would help conceive of an as-yet-unnamed 30-minute short film, to be shot on 16mm film and that would have a low budget (since Winsor was still a film student at the National Film and Television School).

Considering the various ways the duo could keep the budget small, Peacock brainstormed single-location settings where young people and teenagers would gather in a group, eventually settling on the concept of a house party. It took Peacock one weekend to write the original 30-minute script.

The short was shot with all but one of the eventual feature film cast, and Peacock refers to it as being "better than the feature". Having shown the short film to producers, they requested that the feature film be 90 minutes long, forcing Peacock to introduce new characters that did not feature in the original short. The feature had a budget of £500,000, roughly £1,851,000 adjusted for inflation (as of August 2026).

== Critical reception ==
Time Out panned the film, writing

Sold as a sassy young British film ('lotta skirt, lotta geezers, lotta class...') with a passable compilation soundtrack, and directed/co-scripted by National Film School graduate Winsor, this comedy of adolescent errors and angst comes across as disappointingly arthritic. The plot - New Year's Eve jollities, expanded from a student short - seems too insubstantial for a full-length feature. It's impossible to sympathise or identify with this charmless assembly of wimps, vamps, wallflowers, fast flash womanisers, piss artists, comic bobbies, vicars, and - that ultimate figure of Carry On hilarity - the horny middle-aged male. You feel Winsor doesn't much like his desperate party people; and that, surely, is unforgivable.

Simon Crust, of the AV Forums, gave a slightly more positive review, writing "Objectively the film is really an average teen comedy and, free from the smut of the American market, this film is British through and through. I love it because I can recognise the party; I went to the very same one for years. Unfortunately it might struggle to find a home with a new audience; sweet though it is, funny as it is, its age may be its downfall."

== Soundtrack ==
The soundtrack album was released early, on 3 December 1982, by A&M Records, Hallmark Records, Karussell International, and Spectrum Music in various markets. Tracks (most of which are cover songs):

1. "Party Party" (Costello) – Elvis Costello and the Attractions with the Royal Guard Horns
2. "Run Rudolph Run" (Marks and Brody) – Dave Edmunds
3. "Little Town Flirt" (Shannon and McKenzie) – Altered Images ^{†}
4. "Yakety Yak" (Leiber and Stoller) – Bad Manners
5. "Tutti Frutti" (Penniman and LaBostrie) – Sting
6. "No Feelings" (Matlock, Rotten, Cook, and Jones) – Bananarama
7. "Driving in My Car" (Barson) – Madness
8. "Band of Gold" (Dunbar and Wayne) – Modern Romance
9. "Elizabethan Reggae" (Binge) – Bad Manners
10. "No Woman, No Cry" (Ford) – Pauline Black ^{†}
11. "Need Your Love So Bad" (John and John Jr.) – Sting
12. "The Man Who Sold the World" (Bowie) – Midge Ure
13. "Auld Lang Syne" (trad., arr. by Hodges and Peacock) – Chas & Dave ^{‡}

^{†} Order of these tracks was switched on some releases.
^{‡} Only present on some releases.

Also used in the film, but not appearing on any soundtrack release, were various other songs by contemporary (mostly new wave) bands:

- "Enola Gay" – Orchestral Manoeuvres in the Dark
- "Flying Saucer Attack" – The Rezillos
- "The Jean Genie – David Bowie
- "Elizabethan Reggae" – Bad Manners
- "Death or Glory" – The Clash
- "Brand New Cadillac" – The Clash
- "(She's a) Runaround" – The Undertones
- "Get Over You" – The Undertones
- "No More Heroes" – The Stranglers
- "Party Girl" – Elvis Costello and the Attractions
- "Our Lips Are Sealed" – The Go-Go's
- "We Got the Beat" – The Go-Go's
- "Happy Birthday – Altered Images
- "Hi Ho Silver Lining" – Jeff Beck
- "Atomic" – Blondie
- "Heart of Glass" – Blondie
- "Is She Really Going Out with Him?" – Joe Jackson
- "Ready Steady Go" – Generation X
- "Crying Shame" – Madness
- "Wooly Bully" – Nine Below Zero
- "Love is the Drug" – Roxy Music
- "Same Old Scene – Roxy Music
- "Missing Words" – The Selecter
- "Street Feeling – The Selecter
- "The Day the World Turned Day-Glo" – X-Ray Spex
- "Somethin' Else" – Sex Pistols
- "A Message to You Rudy" – The Specials
- "Cool for Cats" – Squeeze

== See also ==
- List of films set around New Year
