= The Lords of Flatbush =

1974 film by Martin Davidson and Stephen F. Verona

- Theatrical release poster
- Directed by: Stephen F. Verona; Martin Davidson
- Screenplay by: Stephen F. Verona; Gayle Gleckler; Martin Davidson
- Additional dialogue by: Sylvester Stallone
- Produced by: Stephen F. Verona
- Starring: Susan Blakely; Reneé Paris; Maria Smith; Paul Mace; Henry Winkler; Sylvester Stallone; Perry King
- Cinematography: Joseph Mangine; Edward Lachman
- Edited by: Stan Siegel; Muffie Meyer
- Music by: Joe Brooks
- Production company: The Ebbets Field Film Company
- Distributed by: Columbia Pictures
- Release date: May 1, 1974 (New York)
- Running time: 86 minutes
- Country: United States
- Language: English
- Budget: $380,000
- Box office: $4 million

The Lords of Flatbush (stylized on-screen as The Lord's of Flatbush) is a 1974 American comedy film directed by Martin Davidson and Stephen F. Verona. The film stars Sylvester Stallone, Perry King, Paul Mace, Henry Winkler, and Susan Blakely. Stallone was also credited with writing additional dialogue. The plot is about street teenagers in leather jackets from the Flatbush neighborhood of Brooklyn, New York. The movie, along with American Graffiti, the television hit Happy Days, the musical Grease and its film adaptation, and novelty rock act Sha Na Na, was part of a resurgence in popular interest in the '50s greaser culture in the 1970s.

== Plot ==
Set in 1958, the coming of age story follows four lower middle-class Brooklyn teenagers known as The Lords of Flatbush. The Lords chase girls, steal cars, shoot pool, get into street fights, and hang out at a local malt shop. Chico attempts to win over hard-to-get, waspy Jane while throwing over easier-to-get Annie. Stanley seemingly impregnates his girlfriend Frannie, who pressures him to marry her. Stanley eventually agrees to marry even after finding out before the wedding that Frannie was never pregnant. Butchey Weinstein is highly intelligent but hides his brains behind a clownish front in order to fit in with the gang. Wimpy Murgalo is a loyal follower in awe of Stanley, eventually becoming best man at his wedding. All four boys seem to discover maturity and responsibility at the end of the film as we witness them bonding during the wedding in their dress suits, eschewing their typical leather jackets.

== Cast ==
- Perry King as Chico Tyrell
- Sylvester Stallone as Stanley Rosiello
- Henry Winkler as Butchey Weinstein
- Paul Mace as Wimpy Murgalo
- Susan Blakely as Jane Bradshaw
- Reneé Paris as Annie Yuckamanelli
- Maria Smith as Frannie Malincanico
- Bruce Reed as Mike Mambo
- Paul Jabara as Crazy Cohen
- Frank Stiefel as Arnie Levine
- Martin Davidson as Mr. Birnbaum
- Joseph Stern as Eddie
- Dolph Sweet as Mr. Rosiello
- Antonia Rey as Mrs. Rosiello

In addition, other notable names amongst the supporting and background performers include co-director Martin Davidson in a cameo as Mr. Birnbaum, future Golden Globe–winner Ray Sharkey as a random student and future Emmy Award–winner Armand Assante as an anonymous wedding guest.

== Production ==
=== Casting ===
Richard Gere was originally cast as Chico but was fired due to conflicts with Stallone during rehearsals. In a 2006 interview Stallone explained:

We never hit it off. He would strut around in his oversized motorcycle jacket like he was the baddest knight at the round table. One day, during an improv, he grabbed me (we were simulating a fight scene) and got a little carried away. I told him in a gentle fashion to lighten up, but he was completely in character and impossible to deal with. Then we were rehearsing at Coney Island and it was lunchtime, so we decided to take a break, and the only place that was warm was in the backseat of a Toyota. I was eating a hotdog and he climbs in with a half a chicken covered in mustard with grease nearly dripping out of the aluminum wrapper. I said, "That thing is going to drip all over the place." He said, "Don't worry about it." I said, "If it gets on my pants you're gonna know about it." He proceeds to bite into the chicken and a small, greasy river of mustard lands on my thigh. I elbowed him in the side of the head and basically pushed him out of the car. The director had to make a choice: one of us had to go, one of us had to stay. Richard was given his walking papers and to this day seriously dislikes me.

== Reception ==
=== Box office ===
The film opened in 2 theaters in New York City on May 1, 1974, and grossed $56,026 in its opening week.

=== Critical response ===
On Rotten Tomatoes, the film has an approval rating of 63% "Fresh" based on 16 critical reviews. On Metacritic, it has a score of 53 out of 100 based on reviews from 6 critics, indicating "mixed or average reviews".

Quentin Tarantino calls it "a pretty good film...the first time I was introduced to the New York independent low-budget film aesthetic".

== See also ==
- Greaser (subculture)
- List of American films of 1974
