= Best Friends (1982 film) =

1982 feature film directed by Norman Jewison

- Theatrical release poster
- Directed by: Norman Jewison
- Written by: Valerie Curtin; Barry Levinson
- Produced by: Norman Jewison; Patrick Palmer
- Starring: Burt Reynolds; Goldie Hawn; Jessica Tandy; Barnard Hughes; Audra Lindley; Keenan Wynn; Ron Silver
- Cinematography: Jordan Cronenweth
- Edited by: Don Zimmerman
- Music by: Michel Legrand
- Production company: Timberlane Productions
- Distributed by: Warner Bros.
- Release date: December 17, 1982
- Running time: 108 minutes
- Country: United States
- Language: English
- Budget: $15-19 million
- Box office: $36.8 million

Best Friends is a 1982 American romantic comedy film starring Burt Reynolds and Goldie Hawn. It is based on the true story of the relationship between its writers Barry Levinson and Valerie Curtin. The film was directed by Norman Jewison.

== Plot ==
Richard Babson and Paula McCullen are a couple of Hollywood screenwriters who have lived and worked together for a number of years. Richard desperately wants to get married but Paula does not feel the need. Having just written a film script for producer Larry Weisman, the couple decides to get married without letting anyone else know. Paula can tell it is important to Richard, so she reluctantly agrees.

Richard and Paula are wed in a Los Angeles marriage bureau and decide to travel cross-country by train to inform their parents back East about what they have done as their honeymoon. The first stop is Buffalo, New York, in the brutal winter, to see Paula's parents. Eleanor and Tim McCullen are old-fashioned, so Paula informs Richard that they will need to sleep in separate beds. Richard is frustrated by the frigid weather and about being treated like a child.

From there, Richard and Paula go to Virginia to visit Richard's parents Ann and Tom, who reside in a giant high-rise condominium. No window is ever opened there and Paula, feeling increasing panic attacks, is in dire need of some fresh air. The Babsons excitedly believe that Paula and Richard are engaged but are devastated to learn that they are already married.

Larry shows up, desperate for pages of a script rewrite. Paula insists on returning home to California immediately but Richard talks her into staying until the end of the week. The Babsons throw a party at a restaurant to celebrate the newlyweds, where Paula is upset by the comments of guests. Paula's frustration growing, she starts taking Valium to cope with the stress. As Richard and Paula's relationship deteriorates, Paula, in an attempt to keep up appearances in front of his relatives, accidentally overdoses and is hospitalized.

Paula and Richard are barely on speaking terms when they return home and their personal and professional relationship has soured. Larry locks them in a room, where the writers bicker and get no work done. Paula again demands fresh air until Richard breaks a window. When they finally talk it through, they are in agreement that getting married might not have been the best idea. They finish the rewrite and then walk off into the sunset, which turns out to be a Hollywood prop.

== Cast ==
- Burt Reynolds as Richard Babson
- Goldie Hawn as Paula McCullen
- Jessica Tandy as Eleanor McCullen
- Barnard Hughes as Tim McCullen
- Audra Lindley as Ann Babson
- Keenan Wynn as Tom Babson
- Ron Silver as Larry Weisman
- Carol Locatell as Nellie Ballou
- Peggy Walton-Walker as Carol Brandon
- Helen Page Camp as Maid
- Joan Pringle as Doria
- Noah Hathaway as Lyle Ballou
- Richard Libertini as Jorge Medina

In addition, Valerie Curtin, who wrote the film's screenplay with husband Barry Levinson (they divorced the year it was released), has an uncredited cameo as Paula's friend sitting in a playpen.

== Production ==
Barry Levinson and Valerie Curtin wrote the screenplay based on their relationship. They had made And Justice for All (1979) with Norman Jewison and showed him a copy of the script. Jewison felt the draft had problems but was persuaded to make it by Goldie Hawn who read the script and was enthusiastic. "I had been impressed with her talent ever since Sugarland Express," said Jewison. "I thought she was one of the most honest performers, so I said, 'If you'll do it, I'll do it'." Hawn later said her part was "probably my most mature role" to date.

Jewison and Hawn decided together on Burt Reynolds as the costar. "My instinct was that we should have star chemistry, like Cary Grant and Carole Lombard, like I had on The Thomas Crown Affair, with Steve McQueen and Faye Dunaway." There were six weeks of filming in New York State, Virginia, Maryland and Washington, D.C., then the unit shifted to Los Angeles. Jewison said he "took my time" with the film. "I made it very carefully, indeed...I had a wonderful time making the film and I haven't seen such good chemistry between leading players since I made The Thomas Crown Affair."

== Music ==
The film's theme song "How Do You Keep the Music Playing?", was composed by Michel Legrand with lyrics by Alan and Marilyn Bergman. In the film, the song (performed by Patti Austin and James Ingram) is first heard as Richard Babson (Reynolds) and Paula McCullen (Hawn) return to Los Angeles after their honeymoon and then heard during the closing credits. "How Do You Keep the Music Playing?" was nominated for an Academy Award for Best Original Song and has become a popular standard and recorded by Johnny Mathis, Tony Bennett, Frank Sinatra, Barbra Streisand, Celine Dion, the Former Ladies of the Supremes and Shirley Bassey. Another song by the same songwriters and performers, "Think About Love", is played during a montage of the train journey.

== Reception ==
In the Chicago Sun-Times, Roger Ebert gave the film three-and-a-half stars out of four and wrote that the plot "sounds like a series of fairly predictable scenes. But they're redeemed by the writing and acting." Janet Maslin of The New York Times stated that Reynolds and Hawn made "a surprisingly appealing team, the surprise being that two individually stellar comic actors can work so comfortably together. Each of them works on a lower wattage than usual, since the emphasis here is on friendliness, rather than on madcap joking." Variety called it "a very engaging film...Even if it is initially jarring to accept Hawn and Reynolds as screenwriters, they are thoroughly believable as two people struggling to make their relationship work. Hawn especially has kept her customary kookiness in check and conveys her character's plight with maturity and charm." Gary Arnold of The Washington Post called the film "exceptionally authentic and endearing...I suppose Reynolds and Hawn have certainly enjoyed showier showcasing, but it should do them no harm at all to be recognized as a likably self-effacing romantic comedy team in a new romantic comedy of rare sweetness and intelligence."

Kevin Thomas of the Los Angeles Times was less enthused, writing that the film "quickly proves to be the familiar instance of the comedy that presents its central figures in the round only to satirize heavily all the peripheral people, most of whom are weighed down in shtick." Gene Siskel of the Chicago Tribune gave the film two stars out of four and asked "Who wants to see such upbeat performers as Hawn and Reynolds bitch at each other for nearly two hours? The casting is wrong here." Pauline Kael of The New Yorker wrote "The script probably reads fine, but it plays all wrong. The dialogue is too neatly worked out; there's no way to speak it without making us aware of how clever it is—how flip yet knowing."

The film has a score of 62% on Rotten Tomatoes, based on 13 reviews.

=== Box office ===
The film opened on 1,062 screens and grossed $4,022,891 for the weekend to finish in fourth place behind Tootsie, The Toy and The Dark Crystal.

=== Awards and nominations ===
Award	Category	Nominee(s)	Result	Ref.
Academy Awards	Best Original Song	"How Do You Keep the Music Playing?"; Music by Michel Legrand; Lyrics by Alan and Marilyn Bergman	Nominated	
Golden Globe Awards	Best Actress in a Motion Picture – Musical or Comedy	Goldie Hawn	Nominated	

The film is recognized by American Film Institute in these lists:

- 2004: AFI's 100 Years...100 Songs:
  - "How Do You Keep the Music Playing?" – Nominated
