= Bruce Reed (actor) =

American film and television actor

- Born: Bruce David Reed; November 13, 1943
- Died: February 20, 1998 (aged 54); Los Angeles, California, U.S.
- Occupations: Film and television actor

Bruce David Reed (November 13, 1943 – February 20, 1998) was an American film and television actor. He was best known for playing Mike Mambo in the 1974 film The Lords of Flatbush.

Reed guest-starred in television programs including Cagney & Lacey, Search for Tomorrow, Scruples, Somerset and Sidekicks. He also appeared in films such as Fade to Black, Sizzle, Club Life, Portrait of a Rebel: The Remarkable Mrs. Sanger, Confessions of a Hitman and The Baltimore Bullet.

Reed died from heart failure at a hospital in Los Angeles, California, at the age of 54.
