= Martin Davidson =

Film director, film producer, screenwriter, television director

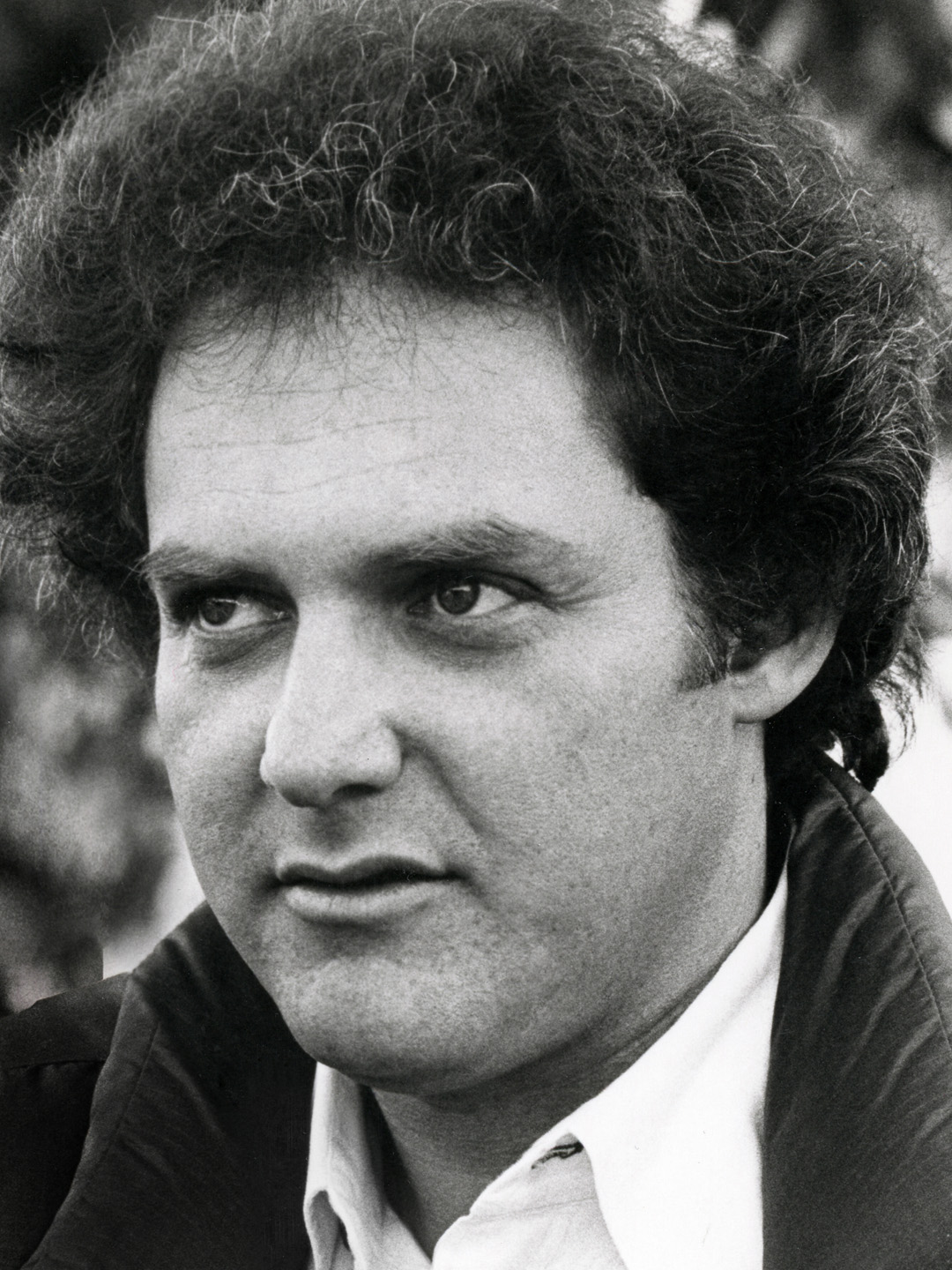
- Davidson in 1978
- Born: November 7, 1939 (age 86); Brooklyn, New York, U.S.
- Occupations: Film director, film producer, screenwriter, television director
- Years active: 1974–2007
- Spouse: Sandy Davidson

Martin Davidson (born November 7, 1939) is an American film director, producer, screenwriter, television director. After attending the American Academy of Dramatic Arts, he spent four (five counting tours) years as an actor in Off Broadway shows and regional theater. His directorial debut was The Lords of Flatbush starring Sylvester Stallone, Henry Winkler and Susan Blakely. He won an ACE award for his film Long Gone.

He is married to residential and restaurant designer Sandy Davidson.

== Filmography ==
=== Film ===
Year	Title	Director	Writer	Producer	Notes
1974	The Lords of Flatbush	Yes	Yes	No	Role: Mr. Birnbaum
1978	If Ever I See You Again	No	Yes	No	
1978	Almost Summer	Yes	Yes	No	
1980	Hero at Large	Yes	No	No	
1983	Eddie and the Cruisers	Yes	Yes	No	
1989	Heart of Dixie	Yes	No	Executive	
1991	Hard Promises	Yes	No	No	
2000	Looking for an Echo	Yes	Yes	Yes	

=== Television ===
Year	Title	Notes
1984	Call to Glory	Episode "Cover Story"
1985	Our Family Honor	4 episodes
1986	Heart of the City	Episode "Working Without a Net"
1990	Law & Order	Episode "By Hooker, by Crook"
1991	My Life and Times	Episode "Millennium"
1991	The Late Show	Episode "Tokyo Newtown"
1993	Picket Fences	Episode "Fetal Attraction"
1996	Chicago Hope	Episode "Hearts and Minds"
2000	Judging Amy	Episode "Instincts"
2002	Girls Club	

TV movies

Year	Title	Director	Writer
1987	Long Gone	Yes	No
1992	A Murderous Affair: The Carolyn Warmus Story	Yes	Yes
1995	Follow the River	Yes	No
1996	Every Woman's Dream	No	Yes

Executive producer

- From Ranch to Raunch (2007) (Documentary film)
