= Paradise Alley =

1978 film by Sylvester Stallone

- Theatrical release poster
- Directed by: Sylvester Stallone
- Written by: Sylvester Stallone
- Produced by: John F. Roach; Ronald A. Suppa
- Starring: Sylvester Stallone; Kevin Conway; Anne Archer; Joe Spinell; Armand Assante; Lee Canalito; Terry Funk; Frank McRae; Joyce Ingalls; Tom Waits
- Cinematography: László Kovács
- Edited by: Eve Newman
- Music by: Bill Conti
- Production company: Force Ten Productions
- Distributed by: Universal Pictures
- Release date: September 22, 1978
- Running time: 107 minutes
- Country: United States
- Language: English
- Budget: $6-8 million
- Box office: $7 million

Paradise Alley is a 1978 American sports drama film written, directed by, and starring Sylvester Stallone (in his feature directorial debut). The film tells the story of the Carbonis, three Italian American brothers in Hell's Kitchen in the 1940s who become involved in professional wrestling. Kevin Conway, Anne Archer, Joe Spinell, Armand Assante, Lee Canalito, Frank McRae, Joyce Ingalls and Tom Waits (in his film debut) co-star in the film.

A number of professional wrestlers appeared portraying supporting characters and in cameos, including Terry Funk, Ted DiBiase, Bob Roop, Dick Murdoch, Dory Funk Jr., Don Leo Jonathan, Don Kernodle, Gene Kiniski, Dennis Stamp, Ray Stevens and Uliuli Fifita.

Paradise Alley was released in the United States on September 22, 1978, by Universal Pictures. The film received negative reviews from critics.

The film was the first of what would be many film collaborations between Funk and Stallone.

== Plot ==
Victor, the youngest and largest of the Carboni brothers (Cosmo and Lenny are the other two), becomes a local wrestler (named Kid Salami) at the request of Cosmo, who thinks there is big money to be made. Lenny agrees to manage his career. They look to Victor to win enough matches so they can escape Hell's Kitchen for good. Victor wants to marry his Asian girlfriend Susan Chow and live on a houseboat they plan to buy in New Jersey.

Each brother has his own style. Cosmo is a hustler and con-artist, always looking for the next easy buck. Lenny is the former war hero, now an undertaker who came back to the neighborhood with a limp and a bitter attitude. Victor is a gawky, strong, dumb yet sincere hulk of a man, who leaves his job hauling ice up tenement stairways once he is persuaded to become a wrestler.

Initially, it is Cosmo that dominates the proceedings, aggressively encouraging Victor to wrestle against Susan's wishes. Lenny is at first unsure of all this and constantly tries to warn Victor off, reminding him that he could get hurt.

Eventually, the roles begin to reverse. Cosmo becomes concerned for Victor's welfare and feels guilty about getting him into wrestling, while Lenny becomes ever more keen to exploit Victor as far as he can. Lenny seems to undergo a complete personality change, losing his calm demeanor and becoming an aggressive, manipulative high roller. In the end, Victor wins a big wrestling match in a rainstorm, and the brothers are reunited.

== Cast ==
- Sylvester Stallone as Cosmo Carboni
- Armand Assante as Lenny Carboni
- Lee Canalito as Victor Carboni
- Frank McRae as "Big Glory"
- Anne Archer as Annie O'Sherlock
- Kevin Conway as "Stitch" Mahon
- Terry Funk as Frankie "The Thumper"
- Joyce Ingalls as "Bunchie"
- Joe Spinell as "Burp"
- Aimée Eccles as Susan Chow
- Tom Waits as "Mumbles"
- Pamela Des Barres as Vonny
- John Cherry Monks, Jr. as Micky
- Frank Pesce as "Skinny the Hand"
- Ray Sharkey as "Legs"
- Michael Jeffers as Paradise Alley Bum
- Paul Mace as "Rat"
- Frank Stallone as Singer
- Red Bastien as Wrestler
- Ted DiBiase as Wrestler
- Dory Funk Jr. as Wrestler
- Don Leo Jonathan as Wrestler
- Don Kernodle as Wrestler
- Gene Kiniski as Wrestler
- Dick Murdoch as Wrestler
- Rock Riddle as Wrestler
- Bob Roop as Wrestler
- Dennis Stamp as Wrestler
- Ray Stevens as Wrestler
- Tonga Fifita as Wrestler
- John Zenda as Wrestler

== Production ==
=== Development and writing ===
Sylvester Stallone wrote the story as a novel then a screenplay before he wrote Rocky. He later recalled:

I was very broke and I optioned the screenplay of Paradise Alley to a real... how should I say this... maggot, who put his hooks in so deep I could never get it away from him. So the first time I went in to meet Chartoff and Winkler, I was there on an acting job. I didn't get it, but on the way out I said, "I have this screenplay called Paradise Alley." They said to bring it over and I did. They wanted to make it, but the other cretin that I had optioned it to was so obnoxious, so overbearing, that the producers wanted nothing to do with me or the screenplay. So on the way out, they said, "If you have any ideas, we'd be happy to look at them." That night I went home — even a fire extinguisher couldn't cool the burning in my brain. The door of opportunity was wide open and I had nothing to carry over its threshold. That's when I started to write Rocky. So thank God for the maggot, otherwise I never would've written the story of Mr. Balboa.

In an interview with Roger Ebert in 1980, Stallone mentioned that Paradise Alley was originally a much longer film before he was forced by Universal Pictures to cut it down. Stallone said: "I'll never forgive myself for the way I allowed myself to be manipulated during the editing of that film. There were a lot of scenes in there to give atmosphere and character, and they wanted them out just to speed things along. They removed 40 scenes, altogether. I put 10 of them back in for the version shown on TV. For example, the whole sequence of the soldier without legs, sitting on a bar eating peanuts."

Edward R. Pressman got involved in the project prior to Rocky however, after the success of Rocky, the project received studio involvement.

== Release ==
=== Theatrical ===
Paradise Alley was released in the United States on November 10, 1978. In the Philippines, the film was released on December 5, 1990, with the song "U Can't Touch This" by MC Hammer included in the soundtrack.

== Reception ==
=== Critical response ===
Paradise Alley received negative reviews from many critics, who often compared the film unfavorably to Rocky. Vincent Canby of The New York Times (who had also written one of the harshest reviews of Rocky) called it "a phony, attitudinizing, self-indulgent mess ... If there had been just a tiny bit of wit involved, or a consistent point of view, or genuine feeling, Paradise Alley might have been an engaging throwback to the true B pictures of yesteryear. As it is, it's Rocky warmed over and then thrown out."

Pauline Kael of The New Yorker also panned the film, writing: "As a director, Stallone shows no more feeling for visual modulation than as Cosmo he does for vocal modulation. In all his capacities here, he's trying to get a hammerlock on our emotions. You feel he'd reach out from the screen and grab you by the throat if he could ... As a writer, he's a primitive mining the mass media, without any apparent awareness of how stale his ideas are. Doesn't he know that there are a lot of us who have seen the same plays and movies he has? Aren't we even expected to remember Rocky? Stallone tries to work our emotions in exactly the same ways, and there's no surprise to the shamelessness this time."

Gary Arnold of The Washington Post wrote: "Maybe there's something to be said for Stallone overreaching himself this early in his starring career. He may be compelled to take a more realistic look at what he can and cannot do after audiences exit shaking their heads over the scatterbrained mentality that seems to control Paradise Alley. Stallone has a distinctive, funny presence and a flair for spontaneous slapstick and sentiment, but he appears to be a miserable coordinator and ringmaster."

Writing in New York, David Denby found the film to have "some moments of warmth in its portrait of gaudy neighborhood bars and dance halls, gangsters, bimbos, and hangers-on, but the movie is so hyperbolic and synthetic you don't believe a minute of it."

John Gault of Maclean's wrote: "The climactic wrestling sequence is so derivative of Rocky you almost start humming 'Gonna Fly Now'. But Rocky did what every good fairy tale does: it temporarily suspended disbelief, made the implausible plausible. That works only if there is a high degree of consistency in plot and characterization, and Paradise Alley doesn't have it."

Gene Siskel gave the film three out of four stars, praising the "rich characters" and declaring it "one of the most colorful films of the year." In a separate article, he called it "a thoroughly engaging film—until its last reel, when Stallone slaps on a conventional, upbeat ending that is all wrong for this movie. It's the ending of Rocky all over again, as Stallone and his older brother in the movie go unpunished for exploiting their baby brother, the brutish giant ... They don't deserve the same fate as Rocky. And to give them the same fate is to insult the audience's intelligence."

Variety gave the film a mostly positive review, calling it "Rocky rewritten by Damon Runyon ... It's an upbeat, funny, nostalgic film populated by colorful characters, memorable more for their individual moments than for their parts in the larger story." The review's only point of criticism was that "The relationship between the men and their women is never explored and is the one unsatisfying element in the film. The women have no life beyond their men; they are types who exist only as companions."

Quentin Tarantino, writing in 2022, said "This film is Stallone's vision and aesthetic, unfiltered, undiluted, and delivered full bore in your face."

The film was nominated for Worst Picture at the 1978 Stinkers Bad Movie Awards.

On review aggregator Rotten Tomatoes, the film has an aggregated score of 40% based on five critic reviews, with an average rating of 4/10. On Metacritic, it has a weighted average score of 53 out of 100 based on eight critics, indicating "mixed or average reviews".

== In popular culture ==
The premise of Paradise Alley was later parodied in "Hundred Dollar Baby", the fifth episode of the second season of It's Always Sunny in Philadelphia. In the episode, Mac (Rob McElhenney) and Dennis Reynolds (Glenn Howerton) exploit the childish Charlie Kelly (Charlie Day) by training him to become an underground street fighter so that they can profit from it. Anne Archer, who portrayed Annie O'Sherlock in Paradise Alley, also portrayed Barbara Reynolds in the series.
