= Nicholas Pryor =

American actor (1935–2024)

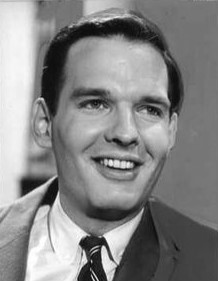
- Pryor in 1964
- Born: Nicholas David Probst; January 28, 1935; Baltimore, Maryland, U.S.
- Died: October 7, 2024 (aged 89); Wilmington, North Carolina, U.S.
- Other name: Nick Pryor
- Education: Gilman School; Yale University
- Occupation: Actor
- Years active: 1955–2021
- Spouse: Christine Belford (m. 1993)
- Children: 1

Nicholas David Pryor (born Probst; January 28, 1935 – October 7, 2024) was an American character actor. He appeared in various television series, films, and stage productions.

== Early life and career ==
Pryor was born Nicholas David Probst in Baltimore, Maryland, the son of Dorothy (née Driskill) and J. Stanley Probst, a pharmaceutical manufacturer.

His early film credits include appearances in The Happy Hooker (1975), Smile (1975), and as nervous college professor Samuel Graves in the 1976 film The Gumball Rally. Notable film credits included appearing alongside William Holden and Lee Grant in Damien - Omen II (1978), as one of the sick passengers in Airplane! (1980), the role of Joel Goodson (Tom Cruise)'s father in the hit movie Risky Business (1983), and as Julian Wells (Robert Downey Jr.)'s estranged father in Less than Zero (1987). His other film credits include The Falcon and the Snowman (1985), Pacific Heights (1990), Executive Decision (1996), The Chamber (1996) and Collateral Damage (2002).

Pryor's most notable television role was that of A. Milton Arnold, the Chancellor of California University, in the television series Beverly Hills, 90210. Pryor's character, who appeared on the show from 1994 to 1997, was a widower and the father of one daughter, Claire (portrayed by Kathleen Robertson). His other television appearances included The Adams Chronicles (1976), Washington: Behind Closed Doors (1977) and Gideon's Trumpet (1980).

In 1964, Pryor was an original cast member of the new soap opera Another World, playing Tom Baxter until the character was killed off after six months. In 1973 Pryor was the second actor to play the role of P.I. Joel Gantry on The Edge of Night. For several years in the late 1990s and early 2000s, he played the role of Victor Collins on General Hospital and its spin-off, Port Charles.

== Personal life and death ==
Pryor's fourth wife was actress Christine Belford, whom he married in July 1993. He had a daughter from an earlier marriage. Belford announced Pryor's death by sharing a note written from the actor. The humble message, Pryor said, was to be delivered to The Hollywood Reporter after his death. The note was shared by his widow, in which he wrote "Nicholas Pryor was enormously grateful to have been, for nearly 70 years, a working actor." Pryor is survived by his daughter, Stacey Pryor, and his grandchildren Auguste and Avril Bas.

Pryor died of cancer at his home in Wilmington, North Carolina, on October 7, 2024, at the age of 89.

== Partial filmography ==
Year	Title	Role	Notes
1961	Alfred Hitchcock Presents	Dane Rosse	Season 6 Episode 14: "The Changing Heart"
1970	The Way We Live Now	Lionel Aldridge	
1974	Man on a Swing	Paul Kearney	
1975	The Happy Hooker	Carl Gordon	
1975	Smile	Andy	
1976	The Gumball Rally	Professor Samuel Graves, Cobra Team	
1977	Washington: Behind Closed Doors	Hank Ferris	
1977	Night Terror	Man in Sports Car	Television film
1978	Damien - Omen II	Charles Warren	
1978	Rainbow	Bill Gilmore	TV movie
1979	The Fish That Saved Pittsburgh	George Brockington	
1980	Airplane!	Mr. Jim Hammen	
1981	Splendor in the Grass	Dr. Judd	TV movie
1982	Little House: A New Beginning	Royal Wilder	
1983	Risky Business	Mr. Goodson	
1983	Blood Feud	John Cye Cheasty	Television film
1984	Second Sight: A Love Story	Mitchell McKay	TV movie
1985	The Falcon and the Snowman	Eddie	
1985	Knight Rider	Vince	Season 4 Episode 8: "Many Happy Returns"
1986	On Dangerous Ground	John Pilgrim	
1986	Murder in Three Acts	Freddie Dayton	TV movie
1987	Morgan Stewart's Coming Home	Tom Stewart	
1987	Less than Zero	Benjamin Wells	
1988	A Stoning in Fulham County	Baxter	TV movie
1990	Brain Dead	Man in Bloody White Suit / Ramsen / Ed Conklin	
1990	Pacific Heights	Hotel Front Office Manager Neil Spisak	
1992	Hoffa	Hoffa's Attorney	
1993	Sliver	Peter Farrell	
1994	Murder Between Friends	Judge Lamartine	
1994	Hail Caesar	Bidwell	
1996	Executive Decision	Secretary of State Jack Douglas	
1996	The Chamber	Judge Flynn F. Slattery	
1997	Murder at 1600	Paul Moran	
1999	Molly	Dr. Prentice	
1999	The Bachelor	Dale Arden	
2002	Collateral Damage	Senator Delich	
2007	The List	Harold Smithfield	
2008	The Four Children of Tander Welch	Tander Welch	
2011	Hart of Dixie	Doctor Harley Wilkes	Season 1, Episode 1: Cameo as the birth father of Zoe Hart who leaves her his medical practice in Bluebell, Alabama
2014	A Short History of Decay	The Man in White	
2014	The Hunger Games: Mockingjay - Part 1	D8 Male Patient	
2015	90 Minutes in Heaven	J.V. Thomas	
2016	Buster's Mal Heart	Mr. Bowery	
2019	Doctor Sleep	Elderly Patient	
2020	The Outsider	Peter Maitland	
2021	The Falcon and the Winter Soldier	Oeznik	2 episodes
2021	Halloween Kills	Coroner	
