= Joyce Ingalls =

American actress (1950–2015)

- Born: Joyce Elaine Ingalls; January 14, 1950; Charleston, South Carolina, U.S.
- Died: August 5, 2015 (age 65); Burbank, California, U.S.
- Occupations: Model, actress
- Spouse: Darrell Fetty

Joyce Elaine Ingalls (January 14, 1950 – August 5, 2015) was an American actress and model, best known for her roles in Paradise Alley in 1978 and Lethal Weapon 4 in 1998. She also had a guest role in the television series Starsky and Hutch in 1979, as the mutual love interest of both main characters.

== Early years ==
Ingalls was born on January 14, 1950, in Charleston, South Carolina, to Frederick G. Ingalls, a U.S. Navy commander, and Elaine Wright Ingalls, a relative of the Wright Brothers. Ingalls had five sisters and three brothers.

Ingalls' mother died in 1959. Her father remarried JoAnn DiSandro, who raised Joyce Ingalls and her four siblings, as well as four more children of Frederick and JoAnn.

== Modeling ==
In 1966, Ingalls won Co-Ed Magazine's national High School Cover Girl contest when she was 16. The contest led to a contract with the Ford Modeling Agency. She appeared in numerous fashion magazines, including Cosmopolitan, Mademoiselle, and Vogue. Ingalls was the face of a 1973 advertising campaign for Yardley of London, a British cosmetics company. She also appeared in print ads for Black Velvet whisky, Breck Shampoo (as one of the Breck Girls), and Clairol.

== Acting ==
Ingalls was best known for her role as Bunchie, a prostitute who comforts Sylvester Stallone's character, Cosmo Carboni, in the 1978 drama, Paradise Alley. She also appeared in The Man Who Would Not Die in 1975, Deadly Force in 1983, and Lethal Weapon 4 in 1998.

== Personal life ==
In 1978, Ingalls was named when Sylvester Stallone was sued for divorce by his wife, Sasha, "who claimed the star of Rocky used community funds for a vacation for himself and actress Joyce Ingalls." Earlier that year, gossip columnist Liz Smith had written: "Sylvester ("Sly") Stallone and his Paradise Valley co-star Joyce Ingalls are what one might call a real hot item. Mrs. Stallone knows all about it and is definitely not happy."

A 1978 newspaper article reported that Ingalls "has been married once previously but doesn't like to discuss that part of her past."

In 1984, Ingalls married Darrell Fetty, a screenwriter and actor, at the Little Brown Church in Studio City, California. They had two sons. Ingalls and Fetty oversaw their Little Brown Church's homeless ministry. They also operated the church's food pantry, now called the Darrell & Joyce Fetty Food Pantry, for nearly 25 years. The food pantry is estimated to have served thousands of families.

== Death ==
Ingalls died of an undisclosed illness at Providence Saint Joseph Medical Center in Burbank, California, on August 5, 2015, at the age of 65. She is survived by her husband, Darrell Fetty; two sons, her stepmother, the former JoAnn DiSandro; and eight siblings. Her father Frederick died in 1996.

== Filmography ==
Year	Title	Role	Notes
1975	The Man Who Wouldn't Die	Pat Reagan	
1978	Paradise Alley	Bunchie	
1983	Deadly Force	Eddie Cooper	
1998	Lethal Weapon 4	Nurse	Final film role
