= Paris Is Out! =

1970 comedic play in English

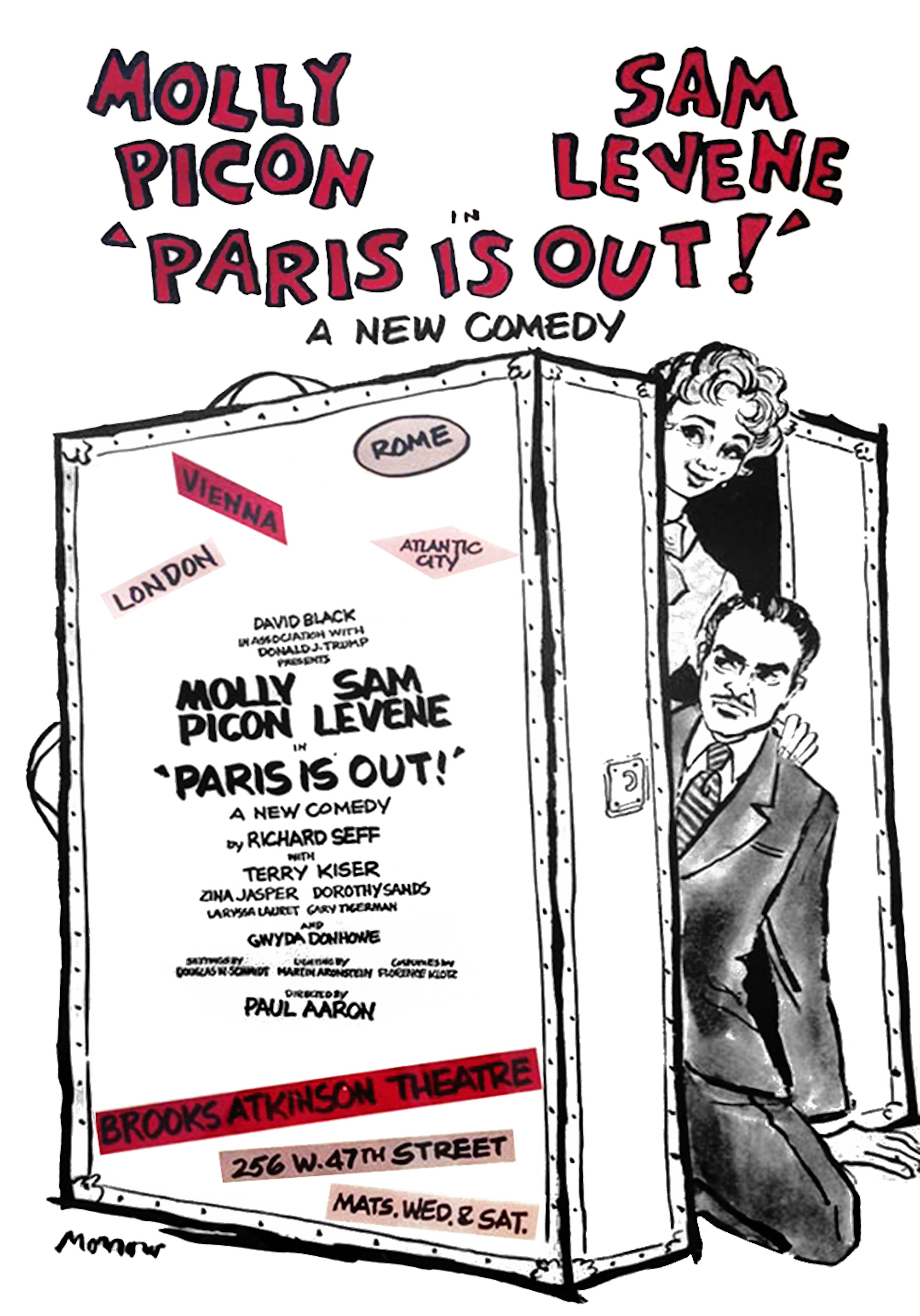
- Window card poster
- Written by: Richard Seff
- Genre: Comedy

Premiere
- Date: February 2, 1970
- Place: Brooks Atkinson Theatre, New York City, U.S.
- Directed by: Paul Aaron

Paris Is Out! is a 1970 Broadway comedy by Richard Seff that starred Sam Levene and Molly Picon as Daniel and Hortense Brand, a married couple planning a vacation. The Broadway production ran for 96 performances after 16 previews at the Brooks Atkinson Theatre between February 2 and April 18, 1970; it was directed by Paul Aaron and produced by David Black in association with businessman and future U.S. President Donald Trump.

== Production ==
Prior to his role as lead producer of Paris Is Out!, David Black had been general manager of five Broadway shows and producer of 16 Broadway shows, including George M!, The Impossible Years, A Funny Thing Happened on the Way to the Forum, and Ready When You Are, CB!, among other shows. Donald Trump invested $70,000 in the production (equivalent to $580,334 in 2025). Richard Seff said of Trump, who was making his first and only investment in a Broadway production, "He seemed to like to be in the theater but I think he looked at it more like real estate, like a business venture, period. He was a very sweet young man at 24."

== Reception ==
Critic Brooks Atkinson observed the play was a "delightful family comedy in which Molly Picon and Sam Levene are in top form". Since Atkinson had recently retired as the Theatre Critic for The New York Times the quote could not be used in promotions as Atkinson did not want to undermine his replacement. Critic Clive Barnes reviewed a Saturday matinee performance of the play for The New York Times stating "I pitied it more than I disliked it", and described it as "a bad play". Barnes' review stated "What must be made instantly clear is that 'Paris Is Out!' is a bad play, not an incompetent play. It is trivial and silly. Yet I know some people who might enjoy it more than 'King Lear'". Although Barnes was critical of the play itself, he had praise for its two stars, stating:

The performances, naturally enough are super professional. Molly Picon is every one's Jewish mother. Sam Levene also is the kind of actor who has audiences eating out of his hand, and critics being less than critical. The pleasure of the entire play is to see Miss Picon and Mr. Levene do a duet of lightly scored domestic agony. For me it was not enough. For others less hard to please, I think, just possibly, it may be

On February 22, 1970, a review by Walter Kerr for the Sunday edition of The New York Times featured the headline "Paris is Out Can Leave Kerr Out". Kerr wrote that "Paris is Out is not exactly what those who hate it take it to be. (I neither hated it I simply sat there and looked at it)". He lauded Sam Levene's performance, describing him as "blessedly funny, as he practically can't help being, no matter what curmudgeonly things he is called upon to do."

The box office gross of the original Broadway production increased each of the eleven weeks it was open, yet an Easter Sunday blizzard forced the closure of Paris Is Out along with two other Broadway plays, Art Buchwald's Sheep on the Runway and a revival of Noël Coward's Private Lives. The play has since been successfully revived in tours and dinner theatre, and it broke records in a run at Philadelphia's Playhouse in the Park with its original co-star Picon. Pat O'Brien and his wife toured with Paris Is Out for 48 weeks, another tour starred Ann B. Davis.

== Cast ==
- Sam Levene as Daniel Brand
- Molly Picon as Hortense Brand
- Gwyda DonHowe as Charlotte Grael
- Terry Kiser as Roger Brand
- Zina Jasper as Arlene Kander
- Laryssa Lauret as Hellevi Gessnehr
- Dorothy Sands as Hattie Fields
- Gary Tigerman as Andrew Grael
