= Deadly Force (film) =

1983 film directed by Paul Aaron

- US film poster
- Directed by: Paul Aaron
- Screenplay by: Ken Barnett; Robert Vincent O'Neil; Barry Schneider
- Story by: Ken Barnett
- Produced by: Sandy Howard
- Starring: Wings Hauser; Joyce Ingalls; Paul Shenar; Al Ruscio; Arlen Dean Snyder; Lincoln Kilpatrick
- Cinematography: Norman Leigh; David Myers
- Edited by: Roy Watts
- Music by: Gary S. Scott
- Production company: Hemdale Film Corporation; Sandy Howard Productions; Transpacific Media Productions
- Distributed by: Embassy Pictures
- Release dates: July 8, 1983 (New York City, premiere); July 9, 1983 (U.S.)
- Running time: 95 minutes
- Country: United States
- Language: English
- Budget: $3 million

Deadly Force (also released as Fierce Encounter) is a 1983 American action thriller film directed by Paul Aaron, and starring Wings Hauser, Joyce Ingalls and Paul Shenar. It is about a former police officer-turned-private investigator (Hauser) hunting a serial killer in Los Angeles.

The film was released on July 8, 1983, by Embassy Pictures.

== Plot ==
Stoney Jackson Cooper resigned from the Los Angeles Police Department in disgrace and moved to New York City to work as a private investigator. He returns to LA at the behest of his friend Sam Goodwin, whose granddaughter has been the victim of a serial killer known as the "X Murderer", so-called because they carve the letter "X" into the heads of their victims.

Upon returning to LA, Cooper is swiftly met with hostility by his former captain Otto Hoxley, having left the force in disgrace years prior. Hoxley threatens Cooper with arrest if he gets involved in the investigation. Cooper is also at odds with his estranged wife Eddie, a journalist also investigating the X Murderer. Finally, Cooper is attacked by thugs working for crime boss Ashley Maynard, who demands that he return to New York. Cooper instead offers to split half the reward money with Maynard in exchange for his assistance. The mobsters to give him two weeks to find the killer.

Cooper investigates a prostitute who was seen with the killer's last victim, but she herself is killed by them. Meanwhile, Eddie interviews Joshua Adams, the head of a self-help organization called the Canfield Institute.

Cooper and Eddie search for a pattern among the victims, and that some may have been chosen randomly to confuse authorities. The killer lures Stoney and Eddie into an ambush, but they survive and manage to chase him down. All three wind up at the Canfield Institute, where the killer takes Eddie hostage, but Adams manages to kill him. Police identify the assailant as Harvey Benton, but Cooper is skeptical about the lack of motive.

Stealing the police file on the X Murderer from Hoxley's office, Cooper, Eddie, and Sam realize that two of a previous victim worked at the same prison as Benton, where another victim's husband was an inmate. Cooper and Sam interview the inmate, who tells them that Benton and a former prisoner named Roger Fulton had developed a program to reform hardened criminals, but that he was a tyrant who abused those in his care and had killed those who refused to participate. Fulton was eventually burned alive by the other inmates, while Benton left the prison. In fact, Fulton had conspired with Benton to fake his death, and changed his name to Joshua Adams, killing those who might reveal his true identity.

Cooper and Sam learn that Eddie is at the Canfield Institute. They try to remove her without alerting Adams, not realizing that she has already told him about the investigation. Cooper and Sam manage to fend off his guards and free Eddie. Adams tries to flee in his car, but Cooper blows it up by shooting the fuel tank.

== Cast ==
- Wings Hauser as Stoney Jackson Cooper
- Joyce Ingalls as Edwina "Eddie" Cooper
- Paul Shenar as Joshua Adams
- Al Ruscio as Sam Goodwin
- Arlen Dean Snyder as Ashley Maynard
- Lincoln Kilpatrick as Otto Hoxley
- Bud Ekins as Harvey Benton
- Paul Benjamin as Lester Strand
- J. Víctor López as Diego
- Hector Elias as Lopez
- Ramón Franco as Jesus
- Gina Gallego as Maria
- Big Yank as Jefferson
- Estelle Getty as Gussie
- Victoria Vanderkloot as Beverly
- Richard Beauchamp as Tony
- Bill Berry as Jack
- Eddie Braun as Eduardo
- BJ Davis as Marty
- Ned Eisenberg as Rat Game Owner
- Ben Mittleman as Harry
- Aaron Norris as Guard
- Frank Ronzio as Sal Saluzzo
- Vanna Salviati as Mrs. Hernandez

== Production ==
The film was first announced in October 1982 under the working title of Fierce Encounter. After being impressed with Wings Hauser during the making of Vice Squad, producer Sandy Howard developed the character of Stoney Cooper specifically for Hauser, in the hopes that it would lead to a franchise.

Cindy Pickett was originally cast as Eddie, but was replaced by Joyce Ingalls shortly before principal photography began.

Filming took place at various locations in Los Angeles.

== Reception ==
Deadly Force was a commercial and critical disappointment.

In a negative review for The New York Times, Vincent Canby called the film "full of the utterly witless, rhythmical motion associated with manufactured-for-television movies, in which one can predict plot developments by the placement of the commercial interruptions."

== Home media ==
Shout! Factory released the film on Blu-Ray in January 2019.
