= List of libraries owned by Amazon MGM Studios =

This is a list of content libraries and catalogs owned by Amazon MGM Studios.

Metro-Goldwyn-Mayer's pre-May 1986 library is currently owned by Warner Bros. via Turner Entertainment Co., a subsidiary of Skydance Corporation, with the exceptions of Babes in Toyland, Twilight Time, Electric Dreams, the 1964–1967 series Flipper, Fame, and the Flip the Frog and Willie Whopper cartoons (still owned by Metro-Goldwyn-Mayer via Orion Pictures for Electric Dreams, Babes in Toyland, and Flipper, although copyright to the former is registered to MGM themselves, while Flip the Frog and Willie Whopper is now owned by the Ub Iwerks estate in conjunction with Thunderbean Animation).

== Content libraries ==
=== Metro-Goldwyn-Mayer ===
==== Film Production/Distribution and Home Entertainment ====
- Metro-Goldwyn-Mayer film library (post-May 1986) (excluding films owned by third-party companies)
  - United Artists film library (post-February 1952) (excluding some post-1952 films, which were owned by numerous third-party companies or fallen in the public domain)
    - Ancillary rights to the Monogram Pictures 187-film library (pre-August 1946) (excluding some films owned by Skydance Corporation via Lorimar Motion Pictures and Melange Pictures)
    - International Pictures film library (excluding The Dark Mirror, owned by Skydance Corporation via Melange Pictures, and Temptation, retained by Universal Pictures)
    - Part of the Eagle-Lion Films library
    - Thorn EMI's A Passage to India
  - Amazon MGM Studios
  - Metro-Goldwyn-Mayer Animation
  - The Cannon Group, Inc. film library (pre-March 1991) (excluding the EMI Films library, owned by StudioCanal, and films owned by third-party companies)
    - Thorn EMI Screen Entertainment (Morons from Outer Space, Dreamchild, The Holcroft Covenant and Wild Geese II)
  - American Cinema Group film library: (Acapulco Gold, Dogs, The Great Smokey Roadblock, A Different Story, Good Guys Wear Black, Go Tell the Spartans, A Force of One, Dirt, The Octagon, Charlie Chan and the Curse of the Dragon Queen Force: Five).
- Distribution rights to the IMAX documentary films produced by K2 Studios and The Stephen Low Company (Volcanoes of the Deep Sea, Flight of the Aquanaut, Rocky Mountain Express, Mysteries of the Great Lakes, Beavers, India: Kingdom of the Tiger, Rescue 3D, Fighter Pilot: Operation Red Flag and Wolves)
- MGM Music

==== Television ====
- MGM Television library (post-1985)
  - MGM+ Studios
  - Amazon MGM Content
  - Big Fish Entertainment LLC
    - Half Moon Pictures
  - Gato Grande Productions (50%)
  - Evolution Media
  - Lightworkers Media
  - Orion Television
    - Filmways Television (excluding The Beverly Hillbillies, Petticoat Junction, and the pre-1981 Ruby-Spears library, owned by Skydance Corporation via CBS Media Ventures and Warner Bros.)
  - United Artists Television (excluding the Popeye the Sailor cartoons, the pre-1950 Warner Bros. Pictures library and the three Gilligan's Island series, and The Fugitive owned by Skydance Corporation via Turner Entertainment Co. and Spelling Television)
    - Ziv Television Programs
- International distribution rights to most NBC Studios television series and specials (1973–2004)

=== Orion Pictures ===
- Orion Pictures film library (post-July 1982) (excluding a few films owned by third-party companies)
  - A portion of the Orion Classics library
  - Filmways Pictures (post-1980) (excluding The First Deadly Sin and Urgh! A Music War, owned by Skydance Corporation via Warner Bros.)
    - American International Pictures (excluding films owned by third-party companies)
    - Sigma III Corporation (excluding films owned by third party companies or that were distributed by Sigma III, such as Closely Watched Trains, owned by the studio that made it, Barrandov Studios)
  - MCEG Sterling Entertainment
    - Intercontinental Releasing Corporation
    - Part of the Manson International library
      - Moviestore Entertainment
  - Motion Picture Corporation of America film library (pre-1999) (excluding co-productions)
  - The Samuel Goldwyn Company (excluding films owned by third-party companies)
    - Heritage Entertainment
    - North American distribution rights to The Rank Organisation film library (home entertainment and streaming rights to certain films) (under license from ITV Studios)
      - Gaumont-British Picture Corporation (home entertainment and streaming rights to certain films) (under license from ITV Studios)
- PolyGram Filmed Entertainment film library (pre-April 1996)
  - A portion of the Island Pictures library
    - A portion of the Island Alive library
    - Island World (excluding Airheads, owned by Disney via 20th Century Studios, and The War, owned by Universal Pictures)
    - Atlantic Entertainment Group
      - Clubhouse Pictures
  - Virgin Films/Palace Pictures
  - Interscope Communications (The Tie That Binds, Two Much, Mr. Holland's Opus and Boys)
  - CDR's Epic library
    - Epic Productions
      - Empire International Pictures (excluding films owned by third-party companies)
      - Trans World Entertainment
      - Vision P.D.G. International
    - Castle Rock Entertainment (home entertainment and streaming rights to certain pre-1994 films)
    - Hemdale Film Corporation (pre-1991) (excluding a few films owned by third-party companies)
    - Sherwood Productions/Gladden Entertainment
    - Nelson Entertainment
      - Embassy Pictures (home entertainment rights to certain films) (under license from StudioCanal)
      - A portion of the Cinecom Pictures library
    - Dino De Laurentiis Communications
    - Fries Entertainment (excluding Flowers in the Attic, owned by Shamrock Holdings via Lakeshore Entertainment, Out of Bounds and Troop Beverly Hills, owned by Sony Pictures via Columbia Pictures)
    - Scotti Bros. Pictures
    - 21st Century Film Corporation (excluding Night of the Living Dead, owned by Sony Pictures via Columbia Pictures)
      - Dimension Pictures
    - A portion of the Sovereign Pictures library
    - Kodiak Films

== See also ==
- List of Amazon MGM Studios television programs
- List of Amazon Prime Video original programming
  - List of ended Amazon Prime Video original programming
- List of Amazon MGM Studios films
- List of Amazon Prime Video original films
- List of assets owned by Amazon MGM Studios
