= Good Guys Wear Black =

1978 film by Ted Post

- Theatrical release poster
- Directed by: Ted Post
- Screenplay by: Bruce Cohn; Mark Medoff
- Story by: Joseph Fraley
- Produced by: Allan F. Bodoh
- Starring: Chuck Norris; Anne Archer; Lloyd Haynes; Dana Andrews; Jim Backus; James Franciscus
- Cinematography: Robert Steadman
- Edited by: Millie Moore; William Moore
- Music by: Craig Safan
- Production company: Mar Vista Productions
- Distributed by: American Cinema Releasing
- Release date: June 2, 1978
- Running time: 96 minutes
- Country: United States
- Language: English
- Budget: $1 million
- Box office: $18.3 million (U.S.)

Good Guys Wear Black is a 1978 American action thriller film directed by Ted Post, and starring Chuck Norris. This was the second film to feature Norris as the star, following Breaker! Breaker! (1977). However, this is the one that Norris considered his "breakthrough". The film co-stars Anne Archer, Lloyd Haynes, Dana Andrews, Jim Backus and James Franciscus.

Following years of kung fu film imports from Hong Kong action cinema during the 1970s, most notably Bruce Lee films followed by Bruceploitation flicks, Good Guys Wear Black launched Chuck Norris as the first successful homegrown American martial arts star, having previously been best known for his film debut as a villain in Bruce Lee's Way of the Dragon (1972). Good Guys Wear Black distinguished itself from earlier martial arts films with its distinctly American setting, characters, themes, and politics, a formula which Norris continued with the similarly successful Force of One (1979). The film featured a first screen appearance by Norris' brother Aaron Norris and the final appearance of Lloyd Haynes.

The film was released by American Cinema Releasing on June 2, 1978. It was a commercial success and helped establish Norris' career as a leading man in action films.

== Plot ==
In 1973, United States Senator Conrad Morgan, the chief delegate diplomat in negotiating the terms of the end of the Vietnam War, made a deal in Paris with Kuong Yen, a North Vietnamese negotiator. The deal called for Yen to release certain key CIA POWs in exchange for Morgan setting up a death-trap for an elite group of CIA assassins, known as the Black Tigers. The treaty was signed, and the Black Tigers were sent into the Vietnam jungle to their unwitting demise, having incorrectly been told that they were on a mission to liberate American POWs. However, the negotiators failed to account for one thing: the commandos' team leader was Major John T. Booker. Despite all odds, Booker survives, as do the four men wise enough to have remained in his general vicinity.

Five years after returning from Vietnam, Booker, now living in Los Angeles, is working as a political science professor at UCLA, with a hobby of race-car driving. At UCLA, Booker lectures on how the war should not have happened and that the United States should not have been involved. Sitting in on one of his lectures is a bright female reporter named Margaret who has some very specific questions about the botched rescue mission. To their shock, someone is slowly killing all the surviving members of the special forces team.

Booker is suddenly thrown back into his past when Morgan's appointment as Secretary of State spurs Yen to blackmail his ex-negotiations buddy into making good on his unfinished deal: the extermination of the Black Tigers.

== Cast ==
- Chuck Norris as Major John T. Booker
- Anne Archer as Margaret
- James Franciscus as Senator Conrad Morgan
- Lloyd Haynes as Murray Saunders
- Dana Andrews as Edgar Harolds
- Jim Backus as Albert
- Lawrence P. Casey as Mike Potter
- Anthony Mannino as Gordie Jones
- Soon-Tek Oh as Minh Van Thieu
- Joe Bennett as Lou Goldberg
- Jerry Douglas as Joe Walker
- Stack Pierce as Holly Washington
- Michael Payne as Mitch
- David Starwalt as Steagle
- Aaron Norris as Al
- Don Pike as Hank
- Benjamin J. Perry as Finney
- Kathy McCullen as Kelly
- Michael Stark as Pitman
- Virginia Wing as Minh's wife
- James Bacon as Senator
- Pat E. Johnson as CIA Agent

== Production ==
Norris had been offered a number of martial arts films but turned them down because he did not want to be limited. "Bruce Lee movies were all karate with a little story thrown in. I want to have a story with some karate scenes."

Norris said a friend wrote the script from a storyline he devised with one of his students. "My country wasn't built on sacrificing people to expedite principles", said Norris.

Norris said he "peddled" the script "all over Hollywood. The night before I was to meet this producer – I'd gone through everyone; he was the last – I thought, 'What can I say to this guy that I haven't said to everyone that's turned me down?' I went to bed, and about 2 o'clock in the morning, the answer popped into my head. And when I met the producer, he asked me the same question the others asked, 'Chuck, why will this movie make money?' And I said, 'First of all, there's four million karate people in America. They all know who I am. And if only half of them go to the movie, that's a $6 million gross on a $1 million budget.' And he said, 'Sounds good to me'."

The film was produced by Allan Bodoh, Mitchell Cannold and Michael Leone. Bodoh ran Mar Vista Productions, who in a two-year period made Dirt, Acapulco Gold, Dogs and The Great Smokey Roadblock.

Norris said during filming that he compared "Breaker! Breaker! with Clint Eastwood's A Fistful of Dollars and Good Guys Wear Black with Dirty Harry." The director, Ted Post, had previously directed Eastwood in Hang 'Em High (1968) and Magnum Force (1973).

Filming started in May 1977. There was an excellent support cast including Dana Andrews. "I do one film a year just to keep my hand in", said Andrews.

"I want to be as big in the movie industry as I've been in the karate industry", said Norris. ""I know I can do it because I've got the faith to do it."

Norris said his character of Booker "had more feeling than the Clint Eastwood characters. Booker's sensitive, caring about people, but if pushed he can take care of the situation. That's like me. I'm an easy going guy but in the ring I have a fanatical desire to win. I want Booker to be someone people can relate to, a hero to worship. Take Bruce Lee, who was an Oriental but able to pull Caucasians. I'm taking a little from Eastwood, a little from Lee, and a little special effects from James Bond. John T Booker is someone moviegoers can emulate, to be that kind of person, a guy who doesn't push his weight around, an easygoing person who can be dangerous." Chuck Norris had a long dialogue scene with James Franciscus about the Vietnam War. Steve McQueen, who Norris knew, saw it and advised Norris to let support characters take care of the exposition, "then when there's something important to say, you say it." "Let the co-stars do the b.s. dialogue", Norris says McQueen told him. "I do it. Eastwood does it. Bronson does it."

Norris later stated:

The film was having trouble getting distribution, so the producers decided to distribute it themselves, renting theaters in individual cities around the country for a flat fee and pocketing the box-office receipts I traveled with them, opening from cities to hamlets, talking with folks and promoting the film any way I could. Many critics panned that film, but the public embraced it. They filled those theaters and launched my movie career.

== Release ==
=== Rating ===
The film was originally rated R but Norris lobbied successfully to have it changed to PG. "My argument was the strong, positive image I project on the screen", he said. "The word karate, unfortunately, connotes violence to many people. Actually, it's a means of avoiding violent situations, and a form of defense if you have no choice and you're backed into a corner."

=== Distribution ===
The film was distributed by American Cinema Releasing.

== Reception ==
=== Box office ===
After opening on five screens in Denver on June 2, 1978, the movie would go on to gross $18 million at the U.S. box office, due in part to a year-long publicity tour Norris did. (The actor estimated he did over 2,000 interviews in a year and says he had to go to hospital for laryngitis.) It earned rentals of $8.3 million.

=== Critical response ===
Linda Gross of the Los Angeles Times called it "cynical, reasonably entertaining... the slick, efficient murders are less gory to watch than disturbing to contemplate." The Washington Post said "the little plot it [the film] does have goes a long way." Tom Buckley of The New York Times said the film was "short on everything."

The 1996 movie guide "Seen That, Now What?", the film was given the rating of "C–", stating that "the serious-minded plot is poorly matched with the karate-chopping action sequences, and Norris' fancy footwork only occasionally takes fire."

"The first time I saw myself, I didn't feel embarrassed yet thought I could be better", said Norris. "But, by the fourth viewing, I wanted to hide behind a chair."

According to Norris, the critics said that "I was the worst thing in 50 years. Well, I wasn't good, but my feelings were hurt. I said, 'I'm not trying to be Dustin Hoffman; I just want to project a strong positive hero image on the screen.' I went to Steve [McQueen], and he said, 'In Good Guys you talk too much. Too much dialogue. Let the character actors lay out the plot. Then, when there's something important to say, you say it, and people will listen. Anyway, you'll get better as an actor. You should have seen me in The Blob."

The producers went on to make Go Tell the Spartans with Ted Post.

The film was meant to be the first in a series. However no further Booker movies resulted.

== In popular culture ==
Chuck Norris' character in The Expendables 2 is named Booker "The Lone Wolf", in homage to John T. Booker in Good Guys Wear Black. (It also references his movie Lone Wolf McQuade)

== See also ==
- Chuck Norris filmography
