= Wendell Mayes =

American screenwriter (1919–1992)

- Mayes in 1955
- Born: Wendell Curran Mayes; July 21, 1919; Hayti, Missouri, U.S.
- Died: March 28, 1992 (aged 72); Santa Monica, California, U.S.
- Education: Battle Ground Academy
- Alma mater: Central College; Cumberland University
- Occupation: Screenwriter
- Years active: 1955–1992
- Spouse: Phyllis Manning (m 1949–1992; his death)

Wendell Curran Mayes (July 21, 1919 – March 28, 1992) was an American screenwriter, best known for his skill in writing literary adaptations and his work with director Otto Preminger. He was nominated for an Academy Award for Best Adapted Screenplay for the film Anatomy of a Murder (1959).

His other notable films included The Spirit of St. Louis (1957), The Enemy Below (also 1957), Advise and Consent (1962), In Harm's Way (1965), Hotel (1967), The Poseidon Adventure (1972), Go Tell the Spartans (1978), and the original Death Wish (1974).

== Early life ==
Mayes was born on July 21, 1919, in Hayti, Missouri. His father, Von Mayes, was a lawyer, and his mother, Irene (née Haynes), was a teacher. Wendell attended primary school in Caruthersville, Missouri; Battle Ground Academy in Franklin, Tennessee; and Central College in Fayette, Missouri. He had one year of law school at Cumberland University in Lebanon, Tennessee.

Mayes moved to Washington, D.C., to work as a filing clerk in the Agricultural Adjustment Administration, then to New York, where he worked in the theater. Subsequently, he was an exterminator and gold prospector in Arizona, a truck driver in Texas. During World War II, he worked as a welder in a Baltimore shipyard, and joined the Navy as a petty officer shipbuilder. In 1945, he was discharged from the Navy and moved back to New York.

== Screenwriting career ==
Mayes began as an actor, then turned to writing. An episode that he wrote for Pond's Theater received a good review in a Los Angeles newspaper, and led Billy Wilder to hire him to work on the script to the film The Spirit of St. Louis.

For Anatomy of a Murder, Mayes received a New York Film Critics Circle Award for best screenplay in 1959 and an Oscar nomination in 1960. It is claimed to be one of the best trial movies of all time.

His last script was Criminal Behavior which starred Farrah Fawcett.

== Death ==
Mayes died of cancer aged 72 on March 28, 1992, in Santa Monica, California.

== Filmography ==
=== Film ===
Year	Title	Director	Notes
1957	The Spirit of St. Louis	Billy Wilder	Co-writer with Wilder and Charles Lederer
1957	The Enemy Below	Dick Powell	
1957	The Way to the Gold	Robert D. Webb	
1958	From Hell to Texas	Henry Hathaway	Co-writer with Robert Buckner
1958	The Hunters	Dick Powell	
1959	The Hanging Tree	Delmer Daves	Co-writer with Halsted Welles
1959	Anatomy of a Murder	Otto Preminger	
1960	North to Alaska	Henry Hathaway	Uncredited
1962	Advise and Consent	Otto Preminger	
1965	Von Ryan's Express	Mark Robson	Co-writer with Joseph Landon
1965	In Harm's Way	Otto Preminger	
1967	Hotel	Richard Quine	Also producer
1968	The Stalking Moon	Robert Mulligan	Co-writer with Alvin Sargent
1972	The Revengers	Daniel Mann	
1972	The Poseidon Adventure	Ronald Neame	Co-writer with Stirling Silliphant
1974	Death Wish	Michael Winner	
1974	Bank Shot	Gower Champion	
1978	Go Tell the Spartans	Ted Post	
1979	Love and Bullets	Stuart Rosenberg	Co-writer with John Melson
1982	Monsignor	Frank Perry	Co-writer with Abraham Polonsky

=== Television ===
Year	Title	Notes
1951	Lux Video Theatre	Episode: "A Child is Born"
1955	Pond's Theater	3 episodes
1956-57	Kraft Television Theatre	5 episodes
1960	Encounter	Episode: "Death is a Spanish Dancer"
1983	Savage in the Orient	Television film
1992	Criminal Behavior	Television film

== Awards and nominations ==
Institution	Year	Category	Work	Result
Academy Award	1960	Best Adapted Screenplay	Anatomy of a Murder	Nominated
New York Film Critics Circle	1959	Best Screenplay	Anatomy of a Murder	Won
Writers Guild of America	1960	Best Written Drama	Anatomy of a Murder	Nominated
Writers Guild of America	1979	Best Drama Adapted from Another Medium	Go Tell the Spartans	Nominated
