= Virginia Wing =

- Virginia Wing - Tonight Show with Johnny Carson, Nov 1962
- Born: November 9, 1937 (age 89); Marks, Mississippi
- Education: Mississippi College
- Occupation: Actress
- Years active: 1950–present
- Children: Geoffrey Wing Shotz, Jennifer Li Shotz
- Awards: Best Actress nomination NAACP Image Award
- Honours: Breck Girl Hall of Fame
- Website: virginiawingfilm.com

Virginia Wing (born November 9, 1937) is an American actress, singer, and writer of Chinese descent. Born during the Chinese Exclusion era and raised in the segregated Jim Crow environment of Marks, Mississippi, Wing broke regional and cultural barriers in the 1960s when she became the first non-white contestant to compete in the Miss Mississippi pageant. Over a professional performing career spanning more than six decades, she accumulated over 200 theater, film, and television credits, becoming a prominent pioneer for Asian American representation in the entertainment industry.

Wing began her career as a high-profile model and singer in the 1960s, gaining international recognition as a "Breck Girl" model and appearing on The Tonight Show with Johnny Carson. As an actress, she was an early contributor to the Inner City Cultural Center in Los Angeles, the first minority-owned, multi-racial performing arts institution in the United States. Her career, activism against racial stereotyping, and upbringing in the Mississippi Delta are the central subjects of the documentary film Who's Afraid of Virginia Wing?

== Early life and education ==
Virginia Wing was born on September 11, 1937, in Marks, Mississippi. Her ancestors emigrated from Guangzhou, China, to the United States during the mid-1800s to work during the Gold Rush and on the Transcontinental Railroad. Wing was raised alongside her three brothers and two sisters by her mother, Virginia Wong Wing, and father, Charles Pang Hom Wing, in the segregated environment of the Jim Crow-era Mississippi Delta.

Wing attended Mississippi College in Clinton, Mississippi. During her senior year in 1960, she won the local title of Miss Clinton. This victory enabled her to compete in the Miss Mississippi pageant in Vicksburg, making history as the first non-white contestant to ever participate in the statewide event.

== Career ==
=== Modeling ===
In the early 1960s, Wing transitioned into a commercial modeling and singing career. She achieved national recognition when she was selected as an official "Breck Girl" model, appearing in widespread advertisements for Breck Creme Rinse between 1962 and 1968. In 1965, she starred in an award-winning international advertisement campaign photographed by Melvin Sokolsky for the Guerlain perfume Mitsouko. Her modeling success and Southern roots led to multiple national television appearances, including being featured as a musical guest on The Tonight Show Starring Johnny Carson in 1962 and the SHOW STREET starring Phyllis Diller. In 1965 she sang and danced with Patrick Adiarte of The King and I.

=== Acting ===
Wing relocated to Los Angeles in the 1970's, expanding her work into opera, theater, television, and film. Her professional film career features notable supporting roles in major studio releases, including the crime film Charley Varrick (1973) directed by Don Siegel, and the action film Good Guys Wear Black (1978) starring Chuck Norris. Over more than six decades in show business, Wing accumulated more than 200 performing, playwriting, directing, and script analysis credits. Her theatrical achievements earned her a Best Actress nomination at the Hollywood NAACP Image Awards. After moving back to New York, Wing joined the cast of NYTW's THREE Sisters. In 2023, Wing performed in the off Broadway show Uncle Vanya alongside Tony winners David Cromer and Bill Irwin.

== Activism ==
She became an early, foundational contributor to the Inner City Cultural Center, the nation's first minority-owned, multi-racial performing arts institution. Throughout her theatrical career, she advocated strongly for authentic racial representation and openly criticized systemic stereotyping, sexism, and ageism in the entertainment industry.

== Legacy ==
A collection of her career artifacts, gowns, and personal memorabilia is preserved and displayed on public exhibition at the Mississippi Delta Chinese Heritage Museum located in Cleveland, Mississippi. Virginia's story is told through the documentary Who's Afraid of Virginia Wing? by Larissa Lam
