= Tad Horino =

American actor

Tadashi Horino
- Born: August 14, 1921; Seattle, Washington, U.S.
- Died: October 3, 2002 (aged 81); Los Angeles, California, U.S.
- Occupation: Actor
- Years active: 1966–2002

Tadashi Horino (August 14, 1921 — October 3, 2002) was an American film and television actor.

== Career ==
=== Selected filmography ===
Tadashi Horino had an impressive career in film and television. He appeared in such films as The Kentucky Fried Movie, Go Tell the Spartans, Oh, God! Book II, Bachelor Party, Red Sonja, Remote Control, Bill & Ted's Bogus Journey, Teenage Mutant Ninja Turtles III, Surf Ninjas, Brother, Mulholland Drive and Kung Pow! Enter the Fist. On television he appeared in the shows I Spy, The Wackiest Ship in the Army, several episodes of Kung Fu, M*A*S*H, Mannix, Charlie's Angels, Wonder Woman, Night Court, Amazing Stories, and Tour of Duty, Columbo.

== Death ==
Horino died in Los Angeles, California, at age 81.

== Filmography ==
Year	Title	Role	Notes
1966	Dimension 5	'Squeaky'	
1974	Airport 1975	Passenger	Uncredited
1977	The Kentucky Fried Movie	Technician	(segment "A Fistful of Yen")
1978	Go Tell the Spartans	One-Eyed Man	
1979	Pacific Inferno	Yamada	
1980	Galaxina	Sam Wo	
1980	Oh, God! Book II	Mr. Yamamoto	
1980	Hito Hata: Raise the Banner	Komatsu	
1983	Uncommon Valor	Mr. Ky	
1984	Bachelor Party	Japanese Businessman	
1985	Red Sonja	Swordmaster	
1986	Eliminators	Takada	
1988	Remote Control	Controller #1	
1989	Homer and Eddie	Mickey	
1990	Come See the Paradise	Mr. Noji	
1991	Bill & Ted's Bogus Journey	Confucius	
1991	Going Under	Japanese Captain	
1993	Teenage Mutant Ninja Turtles III	Grandfather	
1993	Surf Ninjas	Gum-Bey	
1998	Joint Venture	Harada	
2000	Brother	Coffee Shop Owner	
2001	Mulholland Drive	Taka	
2002	Kung Pow! Enter the Fist	Chew Fat Lip	(final film role)
