= Robert Anderson (artist) =

American portrait artist (born 1946)

- Born: January 26, 1946 (age 79)
- Occupation: portrait artist

Robert Alexander Anderson (born January 26, 1946) is an American portrait artist known for painting the official portraits of George W. Bush and Alan Greenspan as well as designing United States postage stamps.

== Early life and education ==
Anderson was born in 1946 in Wyandotte, Michigan. He graduated from Yale University in 1968 with an American Studies degree, and studied at the Boston School of the Museum of Fine Arts from 1972 through 1975. He served in the United States Naval Reserve between 1969 and 1972 where he saw combat duty in Vietnam. He began painting portraits in professionally in 1973. He has lived in Lexington, Massachusetts, Darien, Connecticut, and currently lives in South Dartmouth, Massachusetts.

== Career ==
Anderson's first job after art school was as an illustrator for the John H. Breck Company, helping relaunch the "Breck Girls" campaign, creating pastel portraits of women for print and television advertising.

Between 1984 and 1989 he worked under contract for the United States Postal Service creating U. S. postage stamps in the Great Americans series including portraits of John Harvard, Red Cloud and Sitting Bull. He has created thirteen U.S. postage stamps and over 250 commissioned portraits.

Anderson went to college with George W. Bush and reached out to the Yale Club about creating a portrait of him which was hung in the Yale Club in 2003. He later created the official portrait of Bush which hangs in the National Portrait Gallery. He has also created official portraits of Department of Homeland Security secretaries Tom Ridge and Michael Chertoff as well as official portraits of former Massachusetts governors William F. Weld and Edward J. King.
