= American Cinema Group =

- Founded: 1975; 51 years ago (as American Financial Resources); 1979; 47 years ago (American Communications Industries)
- Defunct: 1981; 45 years ago (American Communications Industries); July 2, 2019; 7 years ago (American Cinema Group)
- Fate: Bankruptcy, American Communications Industries' acquired by Bankers Trust of New York
- Headquarters: Los Angeles, California, United States
- Key people: Michael Leone (CEO); Alan Belkin (president)
- Products: Feature films
- Parent: American Communications Industries (1975-1981)
- Subsidiaries: American Cinema Productions; American Cinema Releasing

American Cinema Group was a film finance and intellectual property holding company founded by Michael Leone and Alan Belkin that financed the independent Hollywood film production company American Cinema Productions and its parent company, American Communications Industries. The company’s produced film catalogue is currently under the ownership of Amazon MGM Studios, with the films produced after the dissolution of American Communications Industries under the ownership of Disney via 20th Century Studios.

American Cinema Productions originated as Mar Vista Productions from 1975–1978, During this period, distribution of their films was handled by external distributors such as R.C. Riddell and Associates and AVCO Embassy Pictures. The release of Good Guys Wear Black was the first movie that American Cinema self-distributed. Following its commercial success, the Mar Vista Production label was rebranded as American Cinema Production alongside the incorporation of American Cinema Releasing for theatrical releases and the formation of the parent company, American Communications Industries.

American Cinema is credited with resurrecting and modifying the four-wall distribution method for theatrical releases, where a distributor rents the movie theatre for a window of time and reaps the full box-office receipts. When American Communications Industries fell into bankruptcy, the production and distribution company was dissolved and acquired by the Bankers Trust of New York in 1981. American Cinema Group was retained as the shell corporation to manage the American Cinema feature films. In April 2003, they licensed their catalogue to Chris Davis International for DVD distribution.

== History ==
Starting as American Financial Resources, American Cinema Group financed American Cinema Productions and acquired third-party film productions. Michael Leone started American Cinema Productions as Mar Vista Productions to shoot low-budget, tax-shelter genre movies as the production arm of American Cinema Group. Their offices started in a bank building in Torrance, California. He chose the location for its vicinity to the airport which made it easy for investors to fly in and out of the area. Many American Cinema projects were directly financed and overseen by producer Roger Riddell. After a number of early successes, American Cinema relocated to an office in Hollywood and began full production of its own projects under American Cinema Productions.

Mar Vista Productions started with Dogs. On 3 July 1977, it was reported that the film used 32 specially trained dogs. According to an interview with producer Allan F. Bodoh in 31 Jul 1977, Dogs was based on an actual news story about a pack of dogs near Palo Alto, California, that slaughtered cattle at night. Bodoh raised the film's $500,000 budget from a group of investors in Torrance, California. Mar Vista Productions posted a notice of foreclosure sale of Dogs on 21 Apr 1978, citing a "default . . . in the payment and performance of obligations." by La Quinta Film Partners, Ltd, General Partner Michael F. Leone, Jr., and American Cinema Group. The film, which Mar Vista held as collateral, was to be auctioned off to the highest bidder at 10 a.m. on 5 May 1978 on the Beverly Hills, CA, courthouse steps. La Quinta Film Partners' 1981 copyright was a supplement to an earlier 1977 copyright (LP47872); the new copyright included Mar Vista Productions as co-owner. "All animal sequences in this picture were filmed under the supervision of Cecil Higgins, American Humane Society".

With The Great Smokey Roadblock, the film underwent several title changes before it was officially released. The working title was The Last of the Cowboys in a 27 August 1976 news brief and later referred to the picture as Gentleman John in a 24 September 1976 report. On 12 October 1976, the project had been renamed “The Last of the Cowboys”. Following a screening of The Last of the Cowboys at the Cannes Film Festival in May 1977, none of the major studios made an offer to acquire the film from production company Mar Vista Productions; they considered its storyline of a truck driver dying of cancer so depressing that it would be difficult to market. Dimension Pictures agreed to distribute the film after Mar Vista ceded its creative rights. News items on 10 November 1977 and 23 November 1977 referred to the movie as “Elegant John and His Ladies”, and later, a full-page advertisement on 3 Feb 1978 called the film “Elegant John and the Ladies”. On 11 Feb 1978, Dimension Pictures changed the title to The Great Smokey Roadblock. Against star Henry Fonda’s wishes, Dimension re-edited the picture to capitalize on the popularity of Smokey and the Bandit. After the picture grossed $2 million during a limited run, Dimension deemed the film successful enough to release nationally. The Great Smokey Roadblock was one of five movies named in a foreclosure notice that producer Allan F. Bodoh served on executive producer Michael Leone. Bodoh claimed Leone owed approximately $15 million in mortgage payments on the films. The outcome of the foreclosure action is unknown.

A Different Story was developed over two years. On 16 January 1978, it was reported that the movie was originally rated R by the Motion Picture Association of America, the rating was altered to PG after edits were made. A Different Story went through three different investors before receiving financing from The Petersen Company on 14 June 1978. A Different Story marked the directorial debut of Paul Aaron, whose previous directing experience was in theater. Actress Susan Sarandon was originally set to play the female lead, as announced on 27 June 1977, but the part eventually went to Meg Foster on 16 January 1978. Both the U.S. Catholic Conference and the Gay Activists Alliance condemned the film. On 31 May 1978, the Catholic Conference denounced A Different Story as offensive to “just about everybody, perhaps homosexual most of all,”. The Gay Activist Alliance criticized the picture for suggesting that homosexuals cannot live “happily ever after” with a member of their own sex, as mentioned in the 19 Jun 1978 Village Voice review.

With Go Tell the Spartans, according to a 4 Oct 1977 New York Times article, the film took seven years to make with a $3 million budget, raised by Mar Vista Productions largely from doctors, lawyers, and real estate brokers. Before Burt Lancaster was cast as Barker, William Holden was attached to the role in 1972; at the time, the film was budgeted at $7 million, as stated in Kate Buford’s biography, Burt Lancaster: An American Life. However, Buford noted that the production ran out of money toward the end of filming and was almost forced to shut down. Costs were reduced to $1.5 million, with the last $150,000 needed to complete photography personally funded by Lancaster. According to Buford’s biography, Go Tell the Spartans was “barely distributed” by the failing Avco Embassy Pictures, and grossed $3 million. On 8 December 1978, Stanley Kauffman acknowledged the film’s limited release when he advised readers to “go try and find” this “spottily distributed” film, which he judged “the best so far” on the Vietnam War. In 1979, Wendell Mayes’s screenplay was nominated for the Writers Guild of America Award for “Best Drama Adapted from Another Medium.”

They also released Dirt (1979), a collection of off-road competition footage captured by Riddell who also appeared in the film.

Good Guys Wear Black was the first production distributed by American Cinema Releasing. The low-budget 1978 film featured Chuck Norris, a relative unknown outside martial arts circles, in top billing a year after he scored a box-office hit with Breaker, Breaker. Good Guys Wear Black grossed $18 million at the box office using a city-by-city rollout model which saw Norris spend nearly a year on the road on a publicity tour. He has estimated he conducted 2,000 interviews in that period and says at one point had laryngitis. On 25 May 1977, the movie was originally intended as the first film in a series featuring the character “John T. Booker,” Chuck Norris mentioned that his interpretation of the part was based on actor Clint Eastwood’s recurring film role “Dirty Harry,” fellow martial artist Bruce Lee, and the literary and motion picture character “James Bond.” Although American Cinema and their distribution arm released two more Chuck Norris action pictures, A Force of One and The Octagon, the role of John T. Booker was not continued as planned. The Expendables 2 referenced Chuck Norris’ early career by naming his character “Booker”. On 13 February 1980, film rentals totaled $8 million and the newly formed distributor, American Cinema Releasing (ACR), intended to capitalize on the success and Norris’ box-office appeal to interest exhibitors in the company’s expansion toward larger production budgets and nationwide releases. A 19 July 1996 HR legal brief reported that Chuck Norris filed a lawsuit against American Cinema Group (ACG) and executive producer Michael Leone, the studio’s owner, in regards to approximately $100,000 in unpaid income from the film’s revenue. The suit claimed that ACG was ordered to issue payment as a result of a 1987 Los Angeles Superior Court ruling, but failed to do so.

A Force of One marked the theatrical film debut of Bill Wallace, then Professional Karate Association middleweight world full-contact karate champion. On 27 August 1980, writer Elliot Hayden Parker sued Chuck Norris in Los Angeles County Superior Court for at least $15 million, claiming he originated the story for Good Guys Wear Black and A Force of One, in a five-page treatment. According to Elliot Hayden Parker, the films were conceived after he interviewed Chuck Norris for a March 1977 United Airlines magazine Mainliner article titled, “Good Guys Wear Black.” Although Parker was paid $5,000 and signed a contract, he alleged that he was “deceived” by Chuck Norris into releasing rights to the characters, title, and story outline. Elliot Hayden Parker maintained that he entered into an oral agreement with Chuck Norris to write a screenplay after penning a five-page outline based on his story. The complaint went on to say that Elliot Hayden Parker discovered that Chuck Norris had plans to make a movie using the same title as his article and outline without his participation. The men allegedly met, and Elliot Hayden Parker was paid $5,000 to sign an agreement that stipulated Chuck Norris would only use the title and the lead character from Elliot Hayden Parker’s outline for a first film, but then his services would be retained for a second film. In actuality, the agreement waived Elliot Hayden Parker’s rights of ownership, but he was not aware of this at the time. Elliot Hayden Parker alleged that Chuck Norris’ second film, released in Mar 1980 and referred by its working title, Force of One, was “substantially identical” to his original outline. The lawsuit also asked for financial disclosure of both films and sought an injunction against their distribution. The outcomes of the 27 August 1980 case by Elliot Hayden Parker and the 19 July 1996 case by Chuck Norris are currently not available in the Academy of Motion Picture Arts and Sciences library production files.

The American Cinema Group maintained its distribution structure for both its own films alongside select low-budget acquisitions that included Fade to Black, The Silent Scream, and Cheaper to Keep Her.

For The Octagon, director Eric Karson had screenwriter Leigh Chapman add the demise of the ninja training camp to the script because he did not want other film crews to use the unusual set before the film’s release. The secret terrorist octagonal training center was built at a cost of $300,000 and destroyed by fire and explosions for the picture’s climax. The controlled arson was supervised by firemen from the Los Angeles County Fire Department.

With Charlie Chan and the Curse of the Dragon Queen, inspired by the novels and literary characters of Earl Derr Biggers, the movie was the latest installment in the prolific Charlie Chan film franchise, which began in 1926 with the silent serial, The House Without A Key. An article from Village Voice from 5 May 1980 stated that before Charlie Chan and the Curse of the Dragon Queen was made, "An active Asian-American lobby had been instrumental in clearing the air not just of Charlie Chan remakes but of the original films." in response to the perceived negative depiction of Asian Americans. The Charlie Chan character had a long history of being played by Caucasian actors and that, even in 1980, a Caucasian actor had been cast in the title role, angered many. Asian Americans perceived Chan as "a yellow Uncle Tom."—a character who, for them, symbolized stereotypes they had struggled to escape. Groups were formed to oppose the production from the start, including the Coalition to Nix Charlie Chan (aka C.A.N. Charlie Chan), and staged protests and pickets throughout the making of the film. The Village Voice article reported that Chinese for Affirmative Action, a San Francisco group, met with Sherlock the week prior to 5 May 1980. Though the group demanded an "Asian-American play Chan." without the typical broken-English speech patterns, Jerry Sherlock defended the script and claimed he had shown it to "100 Asians before it was sold." Jerry Sherlock also defended the casting of Peter Ustinov, saying there were “no bankable Asian-American stars.” On 7 May 1980, it was reported that American Communications Industries would domestically distribute the film and had negotiated a deal for United Artists to distribute outside the U.S. and Canada. The film would be "The first Charlie Chan theatrical feature in nearly 30 years". A news item on the same day noted that the production had cancelled its plans to shoot in Chinatown the day before, possibly due to protests from Chinese-American groups. The story was developed by “avowed Chan fan” Jerry Sherlock, the producer of the film, who on 22 July 1980 considered himself "An expert on the Orient". Peter Ustinov performs a song as "Charlie Chan" over the opening credits. The song was written by composer Patrick Williams, with whom Peter Ustinov collaborated on the lyrics. Protests against the film continued upon its release. On 8 February 1981, the controversy surrounding the film was so strong that four television stations in Northern California willingly sacrificed an estimated $50,000 in advertising revenue by refusing to air commercials, as a way to show support for the Asian American groups. On 14 February 1981, it was reported that 50 Asian American protesters from C.A.N. Charlie Chan picketed the film’s premiere at the Pacific Theater in Hollywood, to voice their displeasure. Adding further fuel to the fire was the fact that “all the major roles and well over half the supporting parts went to whites,” as noted in a 4 March 1981 UCLA Daily Bruin article. Actress Rachel Roberts made her final onscreen appearance in the film as Mrs. Dangers. On 15 February 1981, a tie-in novel was written by Michael Avallone and published by Pinnacle Books to accompany the film’s release.

For Force: Five, Principal photography began 26 January 1981 in Los Angeles, CA. Production information in the Academy of Motion Picture Arts and Sciences library files reported the filmmakers assembled more than eighty-five martial arts stars for Force: Five, and the movie is said to include 200 fight sequences. On 21 April 1981, United Artists acquired foreign distribution rights, and American Cinema planned to release the film domestically on 10 July 1981. On 29 July 1981, Los Angeles, CA Mayor Tom Bradley declared a “Martial Arts Day” in recognition of the Los Angeles release of Force: Five, with the Mayor’s proclamation noting that most martial arts movies are filmed in the Los Angeles area. On 20 October 1982, Force: Five had resurfaced for distribution after being “shelved” for more than a year as a result of the shutdown of American Cinema Releasing. This would be the final film distributed under American Cinema Releasing.

I, the Jury, was wracked with production issues that included a looming Directors Guild of America strike in the summer of 1981 and a dispute with the screenwriter and original director Larry Cohen over its budget. Cohen was ultimately fired from the film after less than a week of production of principal photography for running the film $100,000 over budget and one day over schedule. By the time production wrapped under a new director, the film was almost double its original budget.Some employees say the strategic shifts made in the board room towards larger productions and marketing budgets are ultimately what led to company to falter. On 14 December 1981, it was announced that this film alongside The Entity and Tough Enough to be acquired by Twentieth Century-Fox.

On 19 Jul 1978, author Frank De Felitta had sold motion picture rights to his latest novel, The Entity, to Universal Pictures Corporation, with plans to write the screenplay and act as co-producer. The novel was published on 31 July 1978. On 9 Jan 1979, Publishers Weekly reported that Frank De Felitta, who was guaranteed $300,000 for his novel, was also being considered as a possible director or executive producer by producers Joe Wizan and Joyce Lukon. No further mention was made of Joe Wizan and Joyce Lukon in onscreen credits for the final film. On 7 February 1980, the Hollywood Reporter revealed that the project had been acquired by American Communications Industries (ACI). The $8.5 million production was to be executive produced by ACI chief executive officer Michael Leone and Alan Belkin, president of the ACI subsidiary, American Cinema Productions. On 21 Mar 1980, it was reported that The Entity would be filmed on location in Europe and the Middle East, along with two other ACI productions. The company’s first choice for director was Roman Polanski before Sidney J. Furie. Polanski’s refusal was reportedly prompted by the project’s sensitive subject matter and ACI’s reputation as an exploitation studio. It was later revealed by Variety on 24 February 1982 that ACI filed for bankruptcy in December 1981, and its assets had been seized by its primary debtor, Bankers Trust of New York. ACI was reportedly in debt for approximately $57 million.

The final film from American Cinema Productions, Tough Enough was referenced by its working title on 12 Nov 1980 as Toughman, an upcoming project from American Cinema Productions (ACP), a subsidiary of American Communications Industries, Inc. Principal photography was planned for summer 1981. On 26 Mar 1981, it was noted that the $5 million production had been renamed Tough Dreams. On 8 May 1981, it was announced that John Leone had been dismissed from the project one week into production, despite the fact that his brother, executive producer Michael Leone, was board chairman of American Communications Industries. John Leone was replaced by Richard Fleischer, who reported on 9 Jun 1981 that all footage from the first week would be discarded. The picture was referred to by its official title, Tough Enough. On 28 June 1981, executive producer Andrew D. T. Pfeffer defended his decision, saying he was unhappy with Leone’s directorial style. However, actors Dennis Quaid, Warren Oates and Stan Shaw argued that Pfeffer could not properly judge John Leone’s performance from 2,000 miles away. On the day Leone was fired, the production was within budget and ahead of schedule. The cast was further disgruntled by the presence of an unidentified, non-union writer, who was hired to revise the screenplay. The Writers Guild of America, which was on strike at the time, investigated the production for “‘scab’ activity.” This would be the final film from American Cinema Productions that would be acquired by Twentieth Century-Fox Film Corp.’s acquisition of domestic distribution rights on 24 February 1982, following ACP’s declaration of bankruptcy in December 1981.

On February 7, 2019, Metro-Goldwyn-Mayer acquired the underlying Mar Vista Productions/American Cinema Productions film catalogue from American Cinema Group. The movies that were trademarked under MGM include Acapulco Gold'', Dogs, The Great Smokey Roadblock, A Different Story, Good Guys Wear Black', Go Tell the Spartans, A Force of One, Dirt'', The Octagon, Charlie Chan and the Curse of the Dragon Queen and Force: Five. I, the Jury, The Entity and Tough Enough were distributed and retained by 20th Century Fox.

== Filmography ==
Release date	Title	Distributor
Acapulco Gold	June 1, 1976	American Cinema Releasing
Dogs	February 23, 1977	American Cinema Releasing
The Great Smokey Roadblock	May, 1977	Dimension Pictures
A Different Story	May 10, 1978	AVCO Embassy Pictures
Good Guys Wear Black	June 2, 1978	American Cinema Releasing
Go Tell the Spartans	June 14, 1978	AVCO Embassy Pictures
A Force of One	May 18, 1979	American Cinema Releasing
Dirt	May 25, 1979	American Cinema Releasing
The Late Great Planet Earth	January 17, 1979	American Cinema Releasing
The Silent Scream	November 15, 1979	American Cinema Releasing
Zulu Dawn	December 14, 1979	American Cinema Releasing
The Octagon	August 8, 1980	American Cinema Releasing
Fade to Black	October 17, 1980	American Cinema Releasing / Compass International Pictures
Charlie Chan and the Curse of the Dragon Queen	February 13, 1981	American Cinema Releasing
Cheaper to Keep Her	March 13, 1981	American Cinema Releasing
High Risk	May 6, 1981	Viacom
Force: Five	June 26, 1981	American Cinema Releasing
Beatlemania: The Movie	July 31, 1981	American Cinema Releasing
I, the Jury	October 9, 1982	20th Century Fox
The Entity	February 4, 1983	20th Century Fox
Tough Enough	May 20, 1983	20th Century Fox
