= Lawrence P. Casey =

American film, stage and television actor

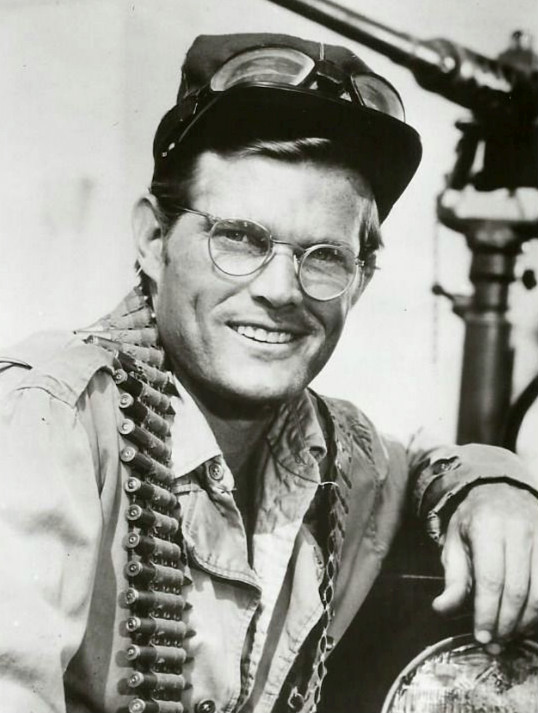
- Casey in The Rat Patrol, 1967
- Born: New York, U.S.
- Occupations: Film, stage and television actor
- Years active: 1958–1992
- Spouse: Katha Dees
- Children: 1

Lawrence P. Casey is an American film and television actor. He is best known for playing driver PFC Mark T. Hitchcock in the American adventure and drama television series The Rat Patrol.

== Life and career ==
Casey was born in Manhattan. He originally worked in construction and was a professional boxer. In 1958, he made his acting debut in the stage play The Visit. He made his screen debut in 1966 in the medical drama television series Dr. Kildare. Casey also guest-starred in an episode of the western television series Gunsmoke.

Casey joined the cast of the ABC action and drama television series The Rat Patrol, playing driver PFC Mark T. Hitchcock. During the series Casey and Christopher George, who played Sgt. Sam Troy, toured Vietnam meeting American troops. After the series ended in 1968 Casey guest-starred in the western television series Bonanza and co-starred as Elliot Crane in the 1969 film The Gay Deceivers.

Casey guest-starred in television programs including The Rockford Files, Ironside, The Love Boat, Knots Landing, Falcon Crest, The Mod Squad and Barnaby Jones. He played Rodney Harrington in the soap opera television series Return to Peyton Place. Casey appeared in films such as Good Guys Wear Black, Acapulco Gold, The Student Nurses, The Great Waldo Pepper and Borderline. He retired from acting in 1992. His last acting credit was an appearance on L.A. Law. He worked as a photographer and then started his own importing business.
