= John Wright (film editor) =

American film editor (died 2023)

- Born: 1943/1944
- Died: April 20, 2023 (aged 79); Calabasas, California, U.S.
- Occupation: Film editor
- Notable work: The Hunt for Red October; Speed
- Spouse: Jane Wright

John Wright (1943/1944 – April 20, 2023) was an ACE-certified film editor.

== Career ==
Wright received two Academy Award nominations for his work on The Hunt for Red October (1990) and Speed (1994). He worked twice with director Mel Gibson, editing The Passion of the Christ (2004) and Apocalypto (2006).

== Death ==
Wright died after battling prostate and bone cancer, on April 20, 2023, at the age of 79.

== Filmography ==
Editor
Year	Film	Director	Notes
1976	Acapulco Gold	Burt Brinckerhoff	First collaboration with Burt Brinckerhoff
1976	Dogs	Burt Brinckerhoff	Second collaboration with Burt Brinckerhoff
1978	Convoy	Sam Peckinpah	
1981	Separate Ways	Howard Avedis	
1981	Only When I Laugh	Glenn Jordan	First collaboration with Glenn Jordan
1982	Frances	Graeme Clifford	First collaboration with Graeme Clifford
1984	Mass Appeal	Glenn Jordan	Second collaboration with Glenn Jordan
1987	The Running Man	Paul Michael Glaser	
1989	Gleaming the Cube	Graeme Clifford	Second collaboration with Graeme Clifford
1990	The Hunt for Red October	John McTiernan	First collaboration with John McTiernan
1991	Teenage Mutant Ninja Turtles II: The Secret of the Ooze	Michael Pressman	
1991	Necessary Roughness	Stan Dragoti	
1993	Last Action Hero	John McTiernan	Second collaboration with John McTiernan
1994	Speed	Jan de Bont	
1995	Die Hard with a Vengeance	John McTiernan	Third collaboration with John McTiernan
1996	Broken Arrow	John Woo	
1998	Deep Rising	Stephen Sommers	
1999	The Thomas Crown Affair	John McTiernan	Fourth collaboration with John McTiernan
1999	The 13th Warrior	John McTiernan	Fifth collaboration with John McTiernan
2000	X-Men	Bryan Singer	
2002	Rollerball	John McTiernan	Sixth collaboration with John McTiernan
2004	The Passion of the Christ	Mel Gibson	First collaboration with Mel Gibson
2006	Glory Road	James Gartner	
2006	Apocalypto	Mel Gibson	Second collaboration with Mel Gibson
2008	The Incredible Hulk	Louis Leterrier	
2010	Secretariat	Randall Wallace	First collaboration with Randall Wallace
2013	A Belfast Story	Nathan Todd	
2014	Heaven Is for Real	Randall Wallace	Second collaboration with Randall Wallace

Editorial department
Year	Film	Director	Role
1976	The Bad News Bears	Michael Ritchie	Assistant film editor
1985	Explorers	Joe Dante	Editor: Alien spaceship sequence
1989	Sea of Love	Harold Becker	Additional editor
1992	Freejack	Geoff Murphy	Additional editor

Documentaries

Editor
Year	Film	Director
1977	Life Goes to War: Hollywood and the Home Front	Jack Haley Jr.

TV documentaries

Editor
Year	Film	Director
1973	Strange Creatures of the Night	David Saxon; Nick Cominos

Editorial department
Year	Film	Director	Role
1973	Strange Creatures of the Night	David Saxon; Nick Cominos	Assistant editor

TV movies

Editor
Year	Film	Director
1978	Cruise Into Terror	Bruce Kessler
1979	The Corn Is Green	George Cukor
1979	Sanctuary of Fear	John Llewellyn Moxey
1979	Blind Ambition	George Schaefer
1979	The Family Man	Glenn Jordan
1980	The Women's Room	Glenn Jordan
1981	Crisis at Central High	Lamont Johnson
1984	Heartsounds	Glenn Jordan
1987	Double Switch	David Greenwalt
1989	My Name Is Bill W.	Daniel Petrie
1991	Sarah, Plain and Tall	Glenn Jordan

TV series

Editor
Year	Title	Notes
1978	The Paper Chase	1 episode
1979	Blind Ambition	4 episodes
1986−87	Amazing Stories	2 episodes

Editorial department
Year	Title	Role	Notes
1973	Strange Creatures of the Night	Associate film editor	1 episode
1980	Hollywood	Assistant editor	1 episode
