= List of assets owned by Amazon MGM Studios =

The following is a list of major assets that are owned by Amazon MGM Studios.

== Assets ==
=== Film production and distribution ===
Logos of Metro-Goldwyn-Mayer, United Artists and Orion Pictures, the studio's primary film units.
- Metro-Goldwyn-Mayer
- United Artists
- Orion Pictures
  - Orion Classics
- American International Pictures
- Prime Movies
- Amazon Content Services
- Amazon MGM Studios Distribution

=== Television ===
- MGM Television
  - MGM Alternative Television
  - MGM International Television
  - MGM On Demand
  - MGM/UA Television
- Big Fish Entertainment LLC
  - Half Moon Pictures
- Evolution Media
- Gato Grande Productions (joint venture with Mexican entrepreneurs Miguel Aleman and Antonio Cué)
- Lightworkers Media
- Orion Television

==== Channels ====
- MGM+
  - MGM+ Marquee
  - MGM+ Hits
  - MGM+ Drive-In
  - MGM+ On Demand
- ScreenPix
  - ScreenPix Action
  - ScreenPix Westerns
  - ScreenPix Voices
  - ScreenPix On Demand
- MGM Sci-Fi (Roku linear channel)

=== Others ===
- Amazon MGM Studios Consumer Products
- MGM Home Entertainment
- MGM Music
- Prime Video Sport
- MGM On Stage

MGM Holdings directly or indirectly owns and controls about 160 affiliates, with the most notable being the following group companies:

=== Final holdings ===
==== Film Production and Distribution ====
- Metro-Goldwyn-Mayer
  - American International Pictures
  - Orion Pictures
    - Orion Classics

==== Television ====
- MGM Television
  - Big Fish Entertainment LLC
  - Evolution Media (Evolution Film & Tape, Inc.)
  - Gato Grande Productions (joint venture with Mexican entrepreneurs Miguel Aleman and Antonio Cué)
  - Orion TV Productions, Inc.
  - Lightworkers Media
- Channels
  - MGM+
    - MGM+ Marquee
    - MGM+ Hits
    - MGM+ Drive-In
    - MGM+ On Demand
  - ScreenPix
    - ScreenPix Action
    - ScreenPix Westerns
    - ScreenPix Voices
    - ScreenPix On Demand
- Impact (joint venture with Comcast)
  - Rede Telecine (Brazilian joint venture with Canais Globo, The Walt Disney Company, Paramount Pictures and Universal Pictures)
    - Telecine Action
    - Telecine Cult
    - Telecine Fun
    - Telecine Pipoca
    - Telecine Premium
    - Telecine Touch
    - Telecine Productions
    - Telecine On Demand
    - Telecine Play
- MGM Sci-Fi (Roku linear channel)

==== Other assets ====
- MGM Consumer Products
- MGM Music
- MGM Sports
- MGM On Stage

=== Former ===
==== Dormant or shuttered ====
- MGM Animation
- MGM Interactive
- MGM Networks
  - MGM Channel
- The Works
- LAPTV (Jointly owned by 20th Century Fox and Paramount Pictures)
  - Cinecanal
  - The Film Zone
  - Movie City
- Carolco Pictures (15%)
- Comet (owned by Sinclair Broadcast Group)
- Charge! (owned by Sinclair Broadcast Group)
- This TV
- Light TV
- MGM Home Entertainment
- MGM Digital
  - Stargate Command – streaming service
  - United Artists Digital Studios
- United Artists Releasing (distribution joint venture with Annapurna Pictures)

==== Divested ====
- Bravo, was acquired 20% share along with former sole owner Rainbow Media, later spun off, acquired by GE's NBC in 2002, afterwards merged with Universal Pictures and Vivendi Universal to become NBCUniversal.
- Rainbow Media, 20% share sold back to its sole owner.
- Motion Picture Corporation of America, spun off from Metro-Goldwyn-Mayer's core film studio divisions.
- Heatter-Quigley Productions, shut down afterwards.

==== MGM HD ====

MGM HD was an all high-definition television cable network owned by the MGM HD Productions subsidiary of Metro-Goldwyn-Mayer (MGM), a division of Amazon's MGM Holdings, Inc. It launched in December 2006 and featured movies from the Metro-Goldwyn-Mayer library of 1,200 movies mastered in a high-definition-compatible format.[2] The films were usually presented uncut and in their original aspect ratio, although some films were edited for content for daytime viewing and commercial breaks were often added during peak viewing hours. MGM HD offered programming like the MGM Channel which was available in 110 countries.

On October 25, 2022 it was confirmed that Amazon would shut down MGM HD on October 31; its assets were merged onto sister service Epix, which re-branded as MGM+ on January 15, 2023.

== See also ==
- Lists of corporate assets
- List of MGM Television programs
- List of Amazon Prime Video original programming
  - List of ended Amazon Prime Video original programming
- List of Amazon MGM Studios films
- List of Amazon Prime Video original films
- List of libraries owned by Metro-Goldwyn-Mayer
