= A Force of One =

1979 film by Paul Aaron

- Theatrical release poster
- Directed by: Paul Aaron
- Screenplay by: Ernest Tidyman
- Story by: Pat E. Johnson; Ernest Tidyman
- Produced by: Alan Belkin
- Starring: Jennifer O'Neill; Chuck Norris; Ron O'Neal; Clu Gulager; James Whitmore Jr.; Eric Laneuville; Bill Wallace
- Cinematography: Roger Shearman
- Edited by: Bert Lovitt; Anne Goursaud
- Music by: Dick Halligan
- Production company: American Cinema Productions
- Distributed by: American Cinema Releasing
- Release date: May 18, 1979
- Running time: 90 minutes
- Country: United States
- Language: English
- Budget: $2.5 million or $3.5 million
- Box office: $17 million or $20.2 million or $23 million

A Force of One is a 1979 American martial arts action-thriller film directed by Paul Aaron and starring Chuck Norris and Jennifer O'Neill, with Ron O'Neal, Clu Gulager, and martial artist Bill Wallace in his film debut. Norris plays karate champion Matt Logan, who is hired to assist an anti-narcotics police unit, who are being targeted by a killer. The screenplay by Ernest Tidyman was based on a story co-written with martial artist Pat E. Johnson.

This was the third film to feature Norris as the star, following Breaker! Breaker! (1977) and Good Guys Wear Black (1978). It was released by American Cinema Releasing on May 18, 1979, and received mixed reviews from critics, but was a financial success, grossing nearly five-times its production budget.

== Plot ==
While investigating a suspected drug den inside a sporting goods store, two plainclothes police officers are killed by a masked assailant using martial arts techniques. In response, Officer Mandy Rust and Lieutenant Sam Dunne approach full-contact karate champion Matt Logan to train their unit in unarmed combat techniques. Logan has a personal stake in the matter, his adopted son Charlie is the son of an addict who died of an overdose.

The drug ring is run by Melrose, who uses his chain of sporting goods store to stash and distribute narcotics to dealers. His chief enforcer, Jerry Sparks, is a ruthless fighter and Logan's martial arts rival. Following Sparks on a hunch, Charlie learns Melrose has a mole on the police force, Sgt. Rollins, but is caught by Sparks and killed, his death staged to look like an overdose. Logan is suspicious, because Charlie never used drugs, and vows to avenge his son's death. Mandy advises him to let the police find Charlie’s killer. She encourages him to win his match against Sparks.

Mandy and her partner, Moskowitz, search the sporting goods warehouse and encounter Rollins, who assures them that his search turned up nothing. Mandy later tells Lt. Dunne she suspects that there is a corrupt officer in the department. Meanwhile, Rollins asks Mandy to get him a ticket to Matt’s fight with Sparks. Before the fight, Mandy searches Rollins’ apartment and discovers cocaine, but Melrose appears, pointing a gun. Mandy manages to subdue Melrose and arrives at the arena.

Matt realizes Sparks is the masked assailant. Rollins is exposed, and arrested after trying to escape with a hostage. Matt and Mandy pursue Sparks in a stolen car as he tries to escape with $1 million in cocaine. In a final confrontation, Matt defeats Sparks in a hand-to-hand fight and kills him by breaking his neck. His body crumples to the ground as Matt and Mandy embrace.

== Cast ==
- Chuck Norris as Matt Logan
- Jennifer O'Neill as Officer Amanda "Mandy" Rust
- Clu Gulager as Lieutenant Sam Dunne
- Ron O'Neal as Sergeant Dan Rollins
- Bill Wallace as Jerry Sparks
- Eric Laneuville as Charlie Logan
- James Whitmore Jr as Moskowitz
- Clint Ritchie as Melrose
- Pepe Serna as Orlando
- Ray Vitte as Newton
- Taylor Lacher as Bishop
- Lisa James as Harriett
- Charles Cyphers as Dr. Eppis
- Rick Prieto as Rodriguez
- Donnie Williams as Josh Lawrence
- Guy Messenger as Skater
- Karen Oberdiear as Alice
- G.W. Bailey as Erwin
- Chu Chu Malave as Rudy
- Kevin Geer as Johnson
- Eugene Butler as Murphy
- Mel Novak as Fight Announcer
- Aaron Norris as Anderson
- Pat E. Johnson as Fight Referee
- Mike Norris as Pizza Deliveryman

== Production ==
A Force of One was the third film to feature Norris as the star, following Breaker! Breaker! (1977) and Good Guys Wear Black (1978). It was produced and distributed by American Cinema Productions, which had previously produced Good Guys Wear Black. In addition to playing the lead role, Chuck Norris was also the film's fight choreographer with his brother, Aaron Norris, was also the stunt coordinator.

The screenplay, written by Oscar-winner and Shaft creator Ernest Tidyman, was based on a story co-created by martial artist and Norris' longtime associate Pat E. Johnson. In a 1980 interview, Tidyman considered it his least successful effort as a craftsman. "I only wrote it to buy my mother a house." he said, although financially it was one of his biggest hits.

Good Guys Wear Black director Ted Post was originally attached to the film. However, he dropped out before filming started due to production delays. Paul Aaron, who was originally hired to rewrite the script, was brought in as a replacement. Aaron had only directed one previous film, A Different Story, but was a well-established theatre director.

This was the film debut of martial artist and undefeated professional kickboxer Bill "Superfoot" Wallace. At the time of filming, Wallace was the PKA World Middleweight Kickboxing Champion.

Filming was predominantly done in San Diego and Los Angeles, California. Many scenes were shot at San Diego Harbor. The kickboxing scenes were shot at the Grand Olympic Auditorium. The street festival scenes were shot at Chicano Park. Oscar-winner John Barry (A Clockwork Orange, Star Wars, Superman) was the production designer. A 15-year-old Keanu Reeves, who was the stepson of director Paul Aaron, worked on the film as an uncredited gofer.

== Release ==
=== Lawsuit ===
Writer Elliot Hayden Parker, a former editor with the United Airlines magazine Mainliner, filed a lawsuit in Los Angeles County Superior Court against actor Chuck Norris, seeking damages of $15 million for the alleged theft of his feature film concept. In March 1977, Parker wrote an article about Norris for his magazine titled “Good Guys Wear Black.” Parker maintained that he entered into an oral agreement with Norris to write a screenplay after penning a five-page outline based on his story. The complaint went on to say that Parker discovered that Norris had plans to make a movie using the same title as his article and outline without his participation. The men allegedly met and Parker was paid $5,000 to sign an agreement that stipulated Norris would only use the title and the lead character from Parker’s outline for a first film, but then his services would be retained for a second film. In actuality, the agreement waived Parker’s rights of ownership, but he was not aware of this at the time. Parker alleged that Norris’ second film, released in March 1980 and referred by its working title, Force of One, was “substantially identical” to his original outline. The lawsuit also asked for financial disclosure of both films and sought an injunction against their distribution. The outcome of the lawsuit has not been determined.

== Reception ==
=== Box Office ===
The film earned box office rentals of $9.98 million. The total gross was reported between $17 million and $23 million, five times the $2.5-3.5 million production budget.

=== Critical response ===
Todd McCarthy of Variety wrote, "Though plot is far-fetched and production values aren't much superior to tv fare, likable protagonists and strong karate sequences will carry the day with the intended audience." Kevin Thomas of the Los Angeles Times called it "a swift, taut, handsomely photographed thriller... made with more craftmanship than most martial arts movies." Gene Siskel of the Chicago Tribune gave the film two stars out of four and dismissed it "just a poor excuse for a lot of fighting." K.C. Summers of The Washington Post wrote, "It's pretty good. Not only does it move along at a faster clip than many a higher-budget film, but it's done without a lot of gore — no small feat in a martial arts movie ... Another plus is that the romantic leads, Jennifer O'Neill and Chuck Norris, actually seem to like one another; they're relaxed and at ease before the camera, and their scenes together are a pleasure to watch."

Chuck Norris said he was "ten times better in" the film than in his previous film Good Guys Wear Black (1978).

== See also ==
- Chuck Norris filmography
