= Daniel Ford =

American novelist

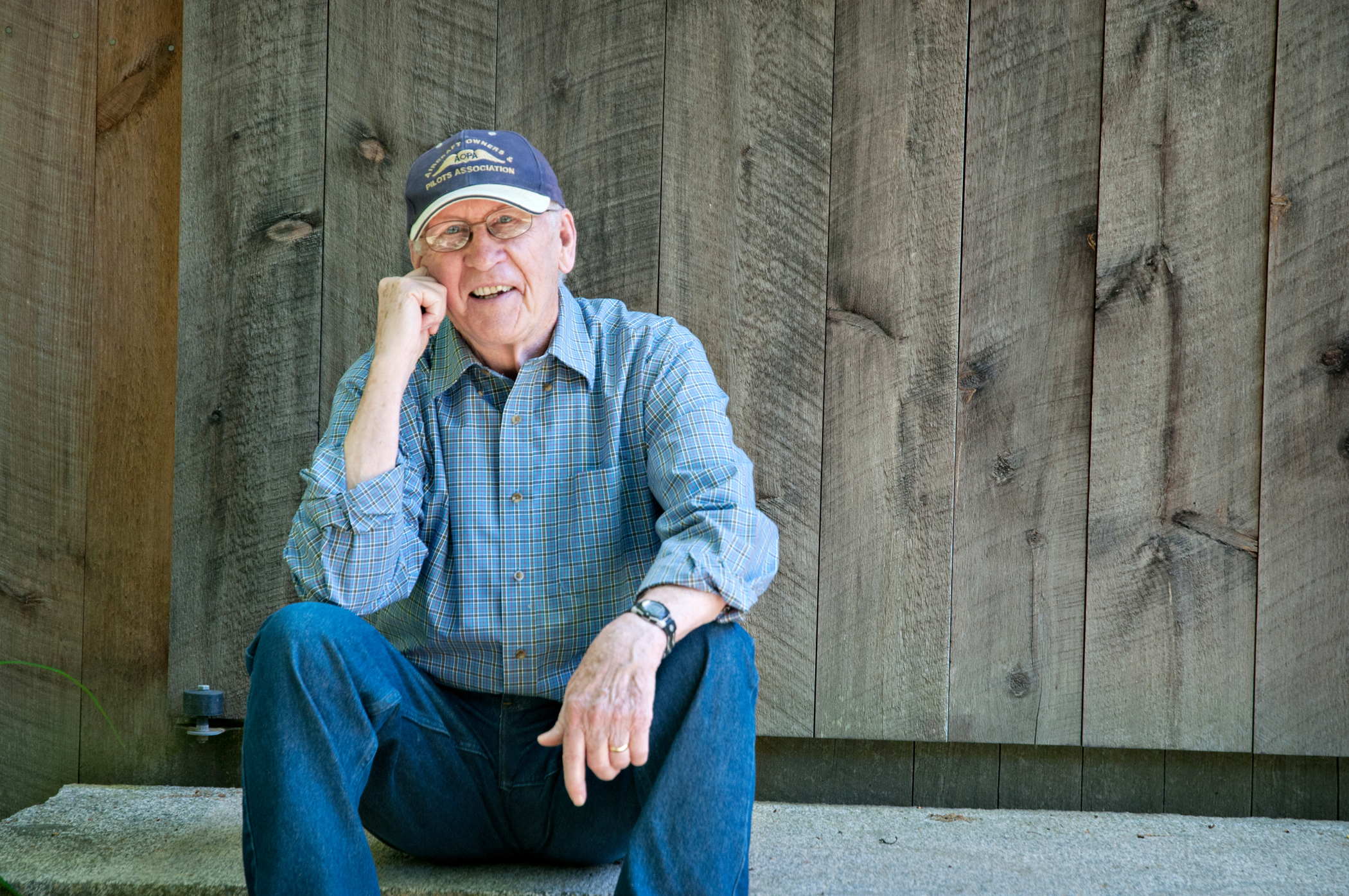
- Born: 1931 (age 94–95); Arlington, Massachusetts, U.S.
- Education: Brewster Academy; University of New Hampshire (AB); University of Manchester; King's College London (MA)
- Occupations: Journalist; novelist; historian
- Parent(s): Patrick Ford; Anne Ford

Daniel Ford (born 1931 in Arlington, Massachusetts) is an American journalist, novelist, and historian. The son of Patrick and Anne Ford, he attended public schools in New Hampshire and Massachusetts, graduating in 1950 from Brewster Academy in Wolfeboro, New Hampshire. He was educated at the University of New Hampshire (A.B. Political Science 1954), the University of Manchester (Fulbright Scholar, Modern European History 1954–55), and King's College London (M.A. War Studies 2010).

Ford served in the U.S. Army at Fort Bragg and in Orléans, France. Following an apprenticeship at the Overseas Weekly in Frankfurt, Germany, he became a free-lance writer in Durham, New Hampshire. He received a Stern Fund Magazine Writers' Award (1964) for his dispatches from South Vietnam, published in The Nation; a Verville Fellowship (1989–90) at the National Air and Space Museum to work with Japanese accounts of the air war in Southeast Asia; and an Aviation - Space Writers' Association Award of Excellence (1992) for his history of the Flying Tigers. He is best known for his Flying Tigers research, and for the 1967 Vietnam novel Incident at Muc Wa that became the Burt Lancaster film Go Tell the Spartans.

Ford is a resident scholar at the University of New Hampshire. He writes for The Wall Street Journal, Michigan War Studies Review, and Air&Space/Smithsonian magazine; maintains the Warbird's Forum and Reading Proust websites; and blogs on Daniel Ford's Blog. He soloed in a J-3 Piper Cub at the age of 68 and flew as a sport pilot until he turned 80.

== Non-fiction ==
- Looking Back From Ninety: The Depression, the War, and the Good Life That Followed (2021) ISBN 978-1732230026
- Cowboy: The Interpreter Who Became a Soldier, a Warlord, and One More Casualty of Our War in Vietnam (2018) ISBN 978-1732230002
- Editor: The Greater America: An Epic Journey Through a Vibrant New Country (1907, revised 2017) ISBN 978-1544938301
- Flying Tigers: Claire Chennault and His American Volunteers, 1941-1942 (1991, 2nd edition 2007, 3rd edition 2016; translated into Chinese) ISBN 978-0-69-273473-5
- Poland's Daughter: How I Met Basia, Hitchhiked to Italy, and Learned About Love, War, and Exile (2013) ISBN 978-1494729899
- A Vision So Noble: John Boyd, the OODA Loop, and America's War on Terror (2010) ISBN 978-1-4515-8981-8
- Editor: The Lady and the Tigers: Remembering the Flying Tigers of World War II, by Olga Greenlaw (1943, revised 2002) ISBN 978-0-595-22234-6
- The Only War We've Got: Early Days in South Vietnam (2001) ISBN 978-1479194728
- Glen Edwards: The Diary of a Bomber Pilot (1998) ISBN 978-1-56098-571-6
- The Country Northward (1976, 2010) ISBN 978-1-4528-3092-6

== Novels ==
- Michael's War: A Story of the Irish Republican Army (2003, 2015) ISBN 978-1508852001
- Remains: A Story of the Flying Tigers (2000, 2013) ISBN 978-1492779506
- The High Country Illuminator: A Tale of Light and Darkness and the Ski Bums of Avalon (1971, 2013) ISBN 978-1481854764
- Incident at Muc Wa: A Story of the Vietnam War (1967; translated into Dutch; filmed as Go Tell the Spartans, 1976; 2012) ISBN 978-1478178187
- Now Comes Theodora (1965, 2000) ISBN 978-0595089178
