= Opposing Force =

1986 film directed by Eric Karson

- Film poster
- Directed by: Eric Karson
- Written by: Linda J. Cowgill (as Gil Cowan)
- Produced by: Daniel Zelik Berk (as Daniel Jay Berk); Tamar E. Glaser
- Cinematography: Michael A. Jones
- Edited by: Mark Conte
- Music by: Marc Donahue
- Production company: Orion
- Release dates: July 23, 1986; (France); August 15, 1985 (U.S., limited)
- Running time: 99 minutes
- Country: United States
- Language: English

Opposing Force, also known as Hell Camp, is a 1986 American action film directed by Eric Karson.

== Plot ==
A group of trainees are brought to an island training camp to perform combat simulation exercises, where their overseer Stafford imprisons them and his boss Becker mistreats them, including raping Casey.

== Cast ==
- Tom Skerritt as Logan
- Lisa Eichhorn as Casey
- Anthony Zerbe as Becker
- Richard Roundtree as Stafford
- Robert Wightman as Gen. McGowan a.k.a. "Botts"
- John Considine as Gen. MacDonald
- George Cheung as Tuan (as George Kee Cheung)
- Paul Joynt as Ripkin
- Jay Louden as Stevenson
- Ken Wright as Conway
- Dan Hamilton as Ross
- Warren McLean as Dunn (as Warren MacLean)
- John Melcher as Jerrell
- Scott Sanders as De Carlo
- Jerald Williams as Fisher (as Jerald Williams)
- Steve Rogers as Brady (as Steven Rogers)
- David Light as Guard
- Bent Pederson as Guard
- Victor M. Ordonez as Guard (as Victor Ordoñez)
- Berto Spoor as Guard
- Ding Navasero as Guard
- Steve Cook as Guard
- Jim Gaines as Guard (as James Gaines)
- Bill Kipp as Guard
- Rohy Batliwala as Guard (as Roy Batiwala)
- Boy Ybanez as Guard (as Boy Ybañez)
- Rafael Shulz as Guard
- Tony "Satch" Williams as Guard (as Tony Williams)
- Renato Morado as Guard
- Jeff Moldovan as Guard (as Jeff Moldava)
- Dina Andrews as Young Casey (uncredited)
- Rick Bean as Extra (uncredited)
- Monty Jordan as Special Forces Captain (uncredited)
- Gerald McCoy as Restaurant Patron (uncredited)

== Production ==
Linda J. Cowgill wrote the script with under title Hell Camp. She ended up using the pen name "Gil Cowan" to conceal the fact that she was a woman.

Scenes of the film were shot in the Philippines as well as Southern California. In the commentary track on the Blu-ray from Scorpion Releasing, director Eric Karson praises the cast as well as the mix of shots from both the Philippines as well as Southern California.

Ricou Browning was the stunt coordinator for the "Miami unit".

== Release ==
The film was released in France on July 23, 1986, followed by a limited release in the United States on August 15, 1986. The film received a theatrical release in Sweden through AB Svensk Filmindustri.

== Reception ==
In the 1994 book Vietnam War Films: Over 600 Feature, Made-for-TV, Pilot and Short Movies, 1939–1992, from the United States, Vietnam, France, Belgium, Australia, Hong Kong, South Africa, Great Britain and Other Countries, Susan Jeffords writes, "With increasing numbers of women entering the U.S. military since the change to an all-volunteer force, the issue of woven holding combat positions has been a source of heated debate. As the service that has been most open to women, it is often presumed that the Air Force will be the first to test this barrier. Opposing Force takes on that debate by showing a woman who is more than competent to fight in combat. Casey wants to fight Becker's troops when Logan advises that they hide, she is shown as very effective with weapons; she is the only one of the three escapees not injured, and she kills Becker. In addition, she had withstood all of the training camp treatments, and remained clear-headed even after the rape. But Opposing Force does more than show a woman soldier; it takes on one of the most frequently stated fears about women's entrance into frontline combat: that they will be sexually assaulted by enemy troops. The film inverts the image though by showing that Casey is more at risk of sexual attack by her fellow soldiers than by a hypothetical enemy (a circumstance confirmed by the 1988 government study Sexual Harassment in the Military by Melanie Martindale, in which 64 percent of US military women imported instances of sexual harassment in their past year of service). But this is no military Thelma and Louise. Though Casey is shown as a more than competent soldier, and she finally kills the man who raped her, the film ends on an ambivalent note. The last shot is a freeze frame on Casey's face as her eyes and her gun aim off-screen. Her voiceover explains that 'They're still waiting for an answer about what I'm going to do. So am I.' Because Becker is depicted as a psychotic megalomaniac who finally goes over the edge, the military as an institution in never implicated in what happens to Casey. In fact, Logan's outrage, which surpasses Casey's, would seem to suggest that good military men exist who will fight to protect women from such harassments."

Reviewer David Nusair of Reel Film Reviews gave the film a rating of one out of four stars, writing, "It's an exceedingly silly premise that's employed to predominantly dull and tedious effect by Eric Karson, as the filmmaker, working from a script by Gil Cowan, delivers a slow-moving narrative that boasts very little in the way of compelling elements – with the less-than-engrossing vibe compounded by a distressing lack of engaging sequences and sympathetic characters. (This is, in terms of the latter, despite decent work from both Skerritt and Eichhorn, as the talented performers are trapped within the confines of barely-developed protagonists.) The often eye-rollingly implausible scenario ensures that Karson is never able to cultivate the suspense and tension he’s clearly striving for, which, when coupled with an action-packed yet thoroughly anticlimactic third act, confirms Opposing Force‘s place as a serious misfire that’s deservedly been forgotten in the decades since its release."

Reviewer Loron Hayed of reelreviews.com gave the film a rating of three out of five stars, writing, "While limited by its budget, Opposing Force is not messing around when it comes to its message of muscle over computers; however, this also means that its message is beyond obvious and therein lies the problem with this production when it comes to competing with the major studios: it's too obvious. Even the electronic music cues do little but cheapen the overall effect of watching the movie."

Reviewer Stunt Rock of thebetamaxrundown.com wrote, "The problem with Opposing Force is that it doesn't go far enough into the female experience. Skerrit's character seems written to take some heat off what could be female-driven scenes: Logan gets upset about the assault and starts the overthrow, going full-on Rambo in the jungle by killing a bunch of the opposing force. Casey could have handled all this, making for a much stronger movie."
