= Breck Shampoo =

American brand of shampoo

Breck
- Product type: Hair care
- Current owner: Henkel North American Consumer Goods
- Country: United States
- Introduced: 1930; 96 years ago
- Markets: North America
- Previous owners: John H. Breck, Inc. (1930-1963), Shulton (1963-1990)
- Ambassador: 10 ambassadors

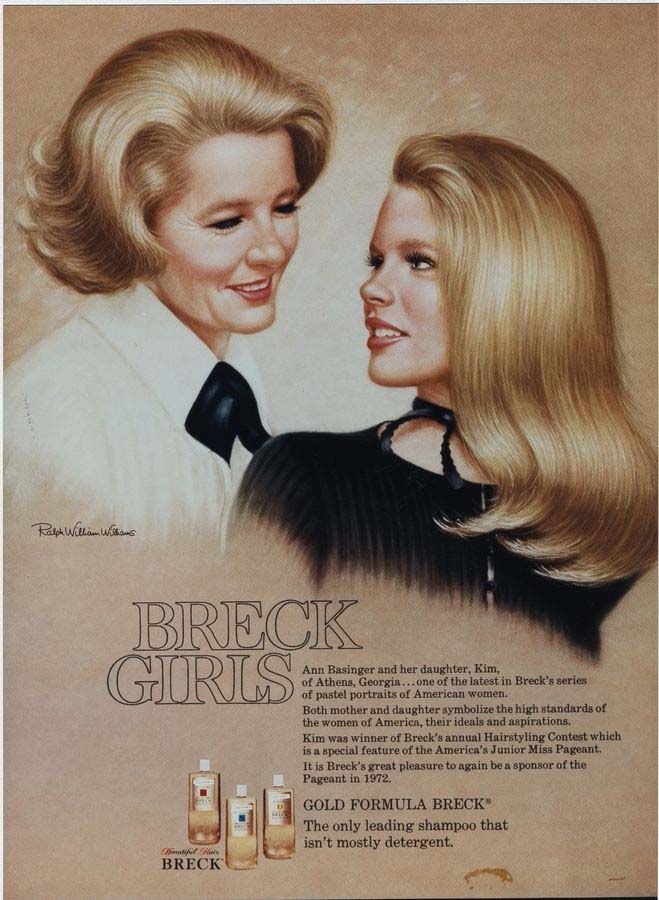
Ann Basinger and her daughter Kim Basinger, 1972

Breck Shampoo is an American brand of shampoo that is also known for its Breck Girls advertising campaign.

== History ==
In 1930, Dr. John H. Breck, Sr. (June 5, 1877 – February 1965) of Springfield, Massachusetts, founded Breck Shampoo. Advertising that "every woman is different," by the 1950s, the shampoo was available in three expressions, color-coded for easy identity:

- D (red label) "For Dry Hair"
- O (yellow label) "For Oily Hair"
- N (blue label) "For Normal Hair"

In 1963, Breck was sold to Shulton Division of American Cyanamid, a chemical company based in New Jersey.

Breck was sold to The Dial Corporation in 1990. In 2001, Dial licensed Breck to The Himmel Group and in 2006 it was licensed to Dollar Tree.

The Dial Corporation (now Henkel North American Consumer Goods) continues to market Breck shampoo in the institutional market.

== Breck Girls ==
In 1936, son Edward J. Breck (1907–1993) assumed management of Breck Shampoo and hired commercial artist Charles Gates Sheldon (1889 – 1961) to draw women for their advertisements. Sheldon's early portraits for Breck were done in pastels, with a soft focus and halos of light and color surrounding them. He created romantic images of feminine beauty and purity. He preferred to draw "real women" as opposed to professional models.

In 1957 Ralph William Williams succeeded Sheldon as the Breck artist. Unlike Sheldon, he often used professional women. Breck advertisements ran regularly in magazines such as Ladies Home Journal, Woman's Home Companion, Seventeen, Vogue, Glamour, and Harper's Bazaar. They were most often on the back cover of the magazine. During these years, Breck Girls were identified through the company's sponsorship of America's Junior Miss contests. After Williams' death in 1976, the advertising tradition stopped. It was relaunched in 1987 with portrait artist Robert Anderson. Celia Gouge from Atlanta was chosen as the 1987 Breck Girl. Joanne DeLavan O'Donnell, also from Atlanta, was chosen as the 1988 Breck Girl. In 1988, the then owner of the brand changed the name of the campaign spokesperson to The Breck Woman.

The Breck Girls ads are archived in the advertising history records in the Smithsonian National Museum of American History.

- 1937 Roma Whitney Armstrong at age 17, first Breck Girl
- 1937 Anya Taranda (1915–1970)
- 1937 Alice Anderson (1917–?)
- 1948 Marylin Skelton
- 1962 Virginia Wing
- 1962 Marie T. Kelly Hynes
- 1963 Ginny Guild
- 1965 Patti Boyd
- 1968 Cheryl Tiegs
- 1968 Cybill Shepherd
- 1971, 1973 Jaclyn Smith
- 1972, 1974 Kim Basinger
- 1974 Brooke Shields
- 1975 Farrah Fawcett
- 1976 Erin Gray
- 1978 Michelle Robin
- 1981 Christie Brinkley
- 1987 Cecilia Gouge (bringing back the Breck girl after a hiatus with a non-model career woman)
- 1988 Joanne DeLavan O'Donnell
