= Eric Karson =

American actor and filmmaker (1940–2026)

- Born: Eric George Karson; March 5, 1940; Phoenix, Arizona, U.S.
- Died: August 24, 2026 (aged 86); Henderson, Nevada, U.S.
- Occupations: Film director, producer, actor

Eric George Karson (March 5, 1940 – August 24, 2026) was an American film producer, director and actor.

== Life and career ==
Karson was born in Phoenix, Arizona on March 5, 1940. Lee Karson, his father, wrote for television shows including The Restless Gun, Wagon Train and The Detectives. Mary, his mother, was a theater actress turned homemaker.

He graduated from Cal State Northridge and began his career as director in Australia on commercials and documentaries. Karson was working for American Cinema Productions when he was offered to make his debut as director on film The Octagon (1980).

Karson died at a hospice in Henderson, Nevada, on August 24, 2026, at the age of 86.

== Filmography ==
- The Octagon (1980) (film director)
- Opposing Force (1986) (film director)
- Black Eagle (1988) (film director, actor)
- Angel Town (1990) (film director, producer)
- Lionheart (1990) (producer, actor)
- Nemesis (1992) (producer)
