= Charlie Chan and the Curse of the Dragon Queen =

1981 film directed by Clive Donner

- Theatrical release poster
- Directed by: Clive Donner
- Screenplay by: Stan Burns; David Axelrod
- Story by: Jerry Sherlock
- Produced by: Jerry Sherlock
- Starring: Peter Ustinov; Lee Grant; Brian Keith; Roddy McDowall; Rachel Roberts; Michelle Pfeiffer; Richard Hatch; Angie Dickinson
- Cinematography: Paul Lohmann
- Edited by: Walt Hannemann; Phil Tucker
- Music by: Patrick Williams
- Production company: Jerry Sherlock Productions
- Distributed by: American Cinema Releasing (United States and Canada); United Artists (International)
- Release date: February 13, 1981
- Running time: 97 minutes
- Country: United States
- Language: English
- Box office: $1.5 million

Charlie Chan and the Curse of the Dragon Queen is a 1981 comedy–mystery film directed by Clive Donner that stars Peter Ustinov, Angie Dickinson and Lee Grant. It is the last film to date to feature the titular character.

== Plot ==
Retired detective Charlie Chan is asked for his help by the San Francisco police to solve a new series of murders. This time his usual sidekick, "Number One Son" Lee Chan, has been replaced by Lee's own son, Lee Chan, Jr.

The prime suspect in the killings is a shadowy lady known as the Dragon Queen, but soon Chan's suspicions fall elsewhere. Among those at risk are Lee's maternal grandmother, Mrs. Lupowitz. Even though Lee Jr. is (as usual) rarely accurate in reading clues, he has the love and full support of his beautiful fiancée Cordelia Farenington.

== Cast ==
- Peter Ustinov as Charlie Chan
- Lee Grant as Mrs. Lupowitz
- Angie Dickinson as The Dragon Queen
- Richard Hatch as Lee Chan, Jr.
- Brian Keith as Police Chief Baxter
- Roddy McDowall as Gillespie
- Rachel Roberts as Mrs. Dangers
- Michelle Pfeiffer as Cordelia Farenington
- Paul Ryan as Masten
- Johnny Sekka as Stefan

== Reception ==
=== Critical response ===
On the review aggregator website Rotten Tomatoes, 33% of 6 critics' reviews are positive, with an average rating of 5.50/10. TV Guide gives Charlie Chan and the Curse of the Dragon Queen 0 out of 5 stars.

Roger Ebert and Gene Siskel loathed the movie, giving it two "no" votes on their public television series Sneak Previews, and later listing it as one of the worst movies of 1981.

Conversely, critic Vincent Canby of The New York Times wrote in his review: "Clive Donner's Charlie Chan and the Curse of the Dragon Queen... is loose-limbed, immensely good-natured entertainment that moves easily between parody and slapstick without ever doing damage to the memories of the character who, in the 1950s and 1960s, gained something of a following as a figure of camp."

== Release ==
Charlie Chan and the Curse of the Dragon Queen was released in theatres on February 13, 1981, by American Cinema Productions.

== Home media ==
The film was released on DVD on September 7, 2004, by Trinity Home Entertainment.
