= The Great Smokey Roadblock =

1977 film

- theatrical poster
- Directed by: John Leone
- Written by: John Leone
- Produced by: Allan F. Bodoh; Susan Sarandon
- Starring: Henry Fonda; Eileen Brennan; John Byner; Dub Taylor; Daina House
- Cinematography: Edward R. Brown
- Edited by: Corky Ehlers
- Music by: Craig Safan
- Production company: Mar Vista Productions
- Distributed by: Dimension Pictures
- Release date: May 1977 (Cannes)
- Running time: 104 minutes
- Country: United States
- Language: English

The Great Smokey Roadblock is a 1977 comedy road film written and directed by John Leone. It stars Henry Fonda, Eileen Brennan, John Byner, Dub Taylor and Daina House. The film is also known as The Goodbye Run and The Last of the Cowboys.

== Plot ==
While 60-year-old truck driver Elegant John Howard is in a Los Angeles hospital, his truck is repossessed by a finance company.

Deciding that it is time to make one last perfect cross-country run, he escapes from the hospital and steals back his truck. His first stop is a diner where he is well remembered. He then picks up Beebo, a hitch-hiker heading to Florida.

Meanwhile, in a Wyoming whorehouse, Madam Penelope and five other prostitutes entertain various men. However, one of the men is an undercover cop, and the place is given 48 hours to close down.

John finds it impossible to get a load, as firms checking his vehicle have it listed as stolen. He visits his old friend Penelope, who suggests that she and her girls head east with John and Beebo, helping them to earn money along the way. They head off into the night with the police on their tail.

En route in Missouri, they are ambushed by Harley Davidson, a renegade country cop who throws them all in jail and awaits the photographers for his moment of fame. The girls strip naked and lure the sheriff and his deputy into the cell, then all escape. They stop into another diner where they know John.

In the next eatery, a TV news program reports their flight from the law and shows sympathy. While there, they encounter a "duck toucher" and his journalist friend. The journalist gives them radio time and encourages them to run the growing blockade, naming them "Elegant John and the Sweet Mystery Six". A cavalcade of vehicles gathers and follows the tractor-trailer, which smashes through the blockade that has been set up on a bridge.

John's illness starts to kick in, so Beebo takes over the driving.

== Cast ==
- Henry Fonda as John Howard known as "Elegant John"
- Eileen Brennan as Penelope
- Austin Pendleton as Guido
- Robert Englund as Beebo Crozier
- Dub Taylor as Harley Davidson
- John Byner as Bobby Apples
- Susan Sarandon as Ginny
- Melanie Mayron as Lula
- Leigh French as Glinda
- Mews Small as Alice C. Smith
- Daina House as Celeste
- Gary Sandy as Charlie La Pere
- Valerie Curtin as Mary Agnes
- Johnnie Collins III as Jimmy
- Bibi Osterwald as Annie McCarigle

== Production ==
The Great Smokey Roadblock was filmed in Oroville, California. Fonda suffered from a number of illnesses during filming.

== Release ==
The film debuted at the May 1977 Cannes Film Festival as The Last of the Cowboys. Dimension Pictures acquired distribution rights and re-edited and retitled the film against Fonda's wishes. The Great Smokey Roadblock was previewed on February 3, 1978, in Texas, and had its premiere in Cincinnati on April 12, 1978, before opening in other states.
