= The Octagon (film) =

1980 film by Eric Karson

- Theatrical release poster
- Directed by: Eric Karson
- Written by: Leigh Chapman
- Story by: Leigh Chapman; Paul Aaron
- Produced by: Joel Freeman
- Starring: Chuck Norris; Lee Van Cleef; Karen Carlson; Art Hindle; Carol Bagdasarian
- Cinematography: Michel Hugo
- Edited by: Dann Cahn
- Music by: Dick Halligan
- Production company: American Cinema Productions
- Distributed by: American Cinema Releasing
- Release dates: August 8, 1980 (Dallas, Kansas City, St. Louis)
- Running time: 103 minutes
- Country: United States
- Language: English
- Budget: $4 million or $2.5 million
- Box office: $19 million (United States) or $25 million

The Octagon is a 1980 American action martial arts film starring Chuck Norris, Karen Carlson and Lee Van Cleef. It was directed by Eric Karson and written by Paul Aaron and Leigh Chapman. The film involves a martial artist (Chuck Norris) who must stop a group of terrorists trained in the ninja style by his foster brother (Tadashi Yamashita).

It was filmed in Los Angeles and released by the distribution wing of American Cinema Productions beginning August 15, 1980. It is notable for its inventive use of voice-over effects to portray the inner life of Norris' character, Scott James. This was actor Richard Norton's film debut.

== Plot ==
The film opens at a secret military training camp led by Katsumoto, who warns his recruits that betrayal will mean death for them and their families. Soon after, members of the group assassinate a diplomat, revealing their reach and brutality.

Scott James, a retired karate champion, attends a dance performance and meets Nancy, a dancer who blends martial arts into her routine. After dinner, they are attacked by ninjas at her home. Scott fights them off but is unable to save Nancy or her family. Seeking answers, he turns to his old mercenary friend McCarn, who denies knowing anything about ninjas and tries unsuccessfully to recruit Scott into his anti-terrorist operation.

Scott later meets a wealthy woman named Justine, who lures him into a confrontation with McCarn. She admits she’s been targeting terrorist leaders and wants Scott’s help to eliminate Seikura, the man responsible for her father’s death. Scott refuses, but his friend A.J., another martial artist, becomes involved with McCarn’s group and learns that Seikura is Scott’s estranged foster brother.

Through flashbacks, Scott remembers training with Seikura, who was disowned by their adoptive father after a violent rivalry. Meanwhile, Seikura trains assassins at a hidden camp called The Octagon. With help from Aura, a disillusioned recruit, Scott infiltrates the organization.

The final act takes place inside The Octagon, where Scott battles through a series of deadly opponents. He faces Seikura’s top enforcer and ultimately confronts his brother in a brutal showdown. As the compound burns around them, Scott kills Seikura, ending their lifelong feud.

== Cast ==
- Chuck Norris as Scott James
- Karen Carlson as Justine Wentworth
- Lee Van Cleef as McCarn
- Tadashi Yamashita as Seikura
- Carol Bagdasarian as Aura
- Richard Norton as Kyo / "Longlegs"
- Art Hindle as A.J.
- Kim Lankford as Nancy
- Kurt Grayson as Doggo
- Yuki Shimoda as Katsumoto
- Jack Carter as Sharkey
- Ernie Hudson as Quinine
- Larry D. Mann as Tibor
- Aaron Norris as "Hatband"
- John Fujioka as Master Isawa
- Michael Norris as Scott James At Eighteen
- Brian Tochi as Seikura At Eighteen
- Tracey Walter as Beatty (uncredited)

== Production ==
Eric Karson had just made the film Dirt (1979).

== Release ==
=== Theatrical ===
The Octagon opened on 244 screens in Dallas, Kansas City, and St. Louis on 8 August 1980, before expanding into Los Angeles on 22 August 1980.

It earned rentals of $9.8 million.

== Reception ==
=== Critical response ===
Variety noted that the film "ought to keep the fans happy. A bizarre plot involving the Ninja cult of Oriental assassins with international terrorism provides plenty of chances for Norris and other martial art experts to do their stuff, and pic has a nicely stylized look with excellent lensing and music. Subtleties of writing and performing are not this film's selling points, so it would be misleading to belabor those inadequacies." Gene Siskel of the Chicago Tribune gave the film two-and-a-half stars out of four and wrote, "It has an understandable story with a little bit of sophistication, which immediately places it head and shoulders above the typical kung-fu chop-socky flick. Unfortunately, 'The Octagon' gets a little too complicated for its own good. There are a bunch of supporting characters who really aren't that crucial to the story, once it gets going in a straight line toward the ultimate confrontation between Scott James and his Oriental relative." Linda Gross of the Los Angeles Times wrote, "What is deeply disturbing about this movie is its inherent cynicism and wholesale endorsement of and commitment to violence. The screenplay by Leigh Chapman from a story by Chapman and Paul Aaron is predicated on the notion that pacifism causes violence and the only way to stop terrorism is to become a better fighter than your enemy, who in this case happens to be the hero's half-brother. The film also implies that if there are no wars around to fight, it's necessary to invent some." Joseph McLellan of The Washington Post wrote, "Clearly 'The Octagon' is no real threat to 'War and Peace' or even 'Beau Geste,' but it will appeal to those who are still in mourning for Bruce Lee, who like carefully choreographed fight scenes and who enjoy standing in front of a mirror looking at their muscles." Tim Pulleine of the Monthly Film Bulletin referred to the film as "routine martial arts hokum, too disjointedly assembled to compel much interest."

== See also ==
- Chuck Norris filmography
- List of American films of 1980
- List of martial arts films
