= Daina House =

American Playboy model

Playboy centerfold appearance
- January 1976
- Preceded by: Nancie Li Brandi
- Succeeded by: Laura Lyons

Personal details
- Born: December 30, 1954 (age 71) Dallas, Texas, U.S.
- Height: 5 ft 7 in (1.70 m)

Daina House (born December 30, 1954) is a former model and actress. She was Playboy magazine's Playmate of the Month for its January 1976 issue. Her centerfold was photographed by Ken Marcus.

Daina was featured on the cover of the 1975 Black Oak Arkansas album, "X-Rated."

House, sometimes credited as "Dana" House, appeared in the short TV comedy film Off the Wall in 1977, and has had numerous smaller roles in other shows.

She is now a ministry leader at the Church on the Way in Van Nuys, California.

| Daina House | Laura Lyons | Ann Pennington | Denise Michele | Patricia McClain | Debra Peterson |
| Deborah Borkman | Linda Beatty | Whitney Kaine | Hope Olson | Patti McGuire | Karen Hafter |
