= Jerry Sherlock =

American film producer

Jerry Sherlock (1933–2015) was an American film and theater producer and educator known for The Hunt for Red October. He was also the founder of the New York Film Academy School of Film and Acting.

== Early life and background ==
Sherlock dropped out of school at the age of fourteen to join the carnival. From then on he was self-educated. After working with the circus he joined the United States Air Force, where he received an honorable discharge. He then started his career as a buyer for S. Klein On The Square, before eventually leaving to establish his own export business in Tokyo and Hong Kong. He returned to New York to start Amtec, a surplus textiles firm, where he became a partner.

He left textiles to establish his own film production company. Within six months of establishing his company he had produced his first film, Charlie Chan and the Curse of the Dragon Queen (1981), starring Michelle Pfeiffer, Peter Ustinov and Angie Dickinson. Later in 1981, he would produce an Edward Albee adaptation of Vladimir Nabokov's novel Lolita on Broadway at the Brooks Atkinson Theatre. The play starred Donald Sutherland as Humbert Humbert.

As an independent producer for film, stage, and television, he developed projects for Disney, Warner Brothers, United Artists, Paramount, and EMI. His credits include executive producer of The Hunt for Red October for Paramount Pictures and executive producer of the television production, Amahl and the Night Visitors, for CBS.

=== New York Film Academy ===
Founded in 1992 by Sherlock, the New York Film Academy originally established itself at the Tribeca Film Center as a film school where students could "learn by doing." The school occupied the Tammany Hall building in Union Square for 23 years. It now has campuses in Battery Park, Los Angeles, South Beach, and Sydney and Gold Coast Australia. NYFA programs include filmmaking, cinematography, acting, photography, producing, game design, graphic design, screenwriting, musical theatre, virtual reality, ESL, broadcast journalism, digital editing, music video, and documentary filmmaking.

== Personal life ==
Sherlock married a Japanese woman named Yumiko; their son Jean was CEO of the New York Film Academy as of 2018.

== Producing credits ==
=== Film ===
- Charlie Chan and the Curse of the Dragon Queen (1981)
- The Hunt for Red October (1990)

=== Television ===
- Amahl and the Night Visitors (1978)

=== Theater ===
- Lolita (1981, Broadway) - written by Edward Albee, novel by Vladimir Nabokov, starring Donald Sutherland, 12 performances.
