= Force: Five =

- Directed by: Robert Clouse
- Written by: Robert Clouse; Emil Farkas and George Goldsmith (based on their screenplay)
- Starring: Joe Lewis
- Cinematography: Gil Hubbs
- Edited by: Bob Bring
- Music by: William Goldstein
- Production company: American Cinema Productions
- Distributed by: American Cinema Releasing (United States and Canada); United Artists (International)
- Release dates: June 26, 1981 (Indianapolis, Minneapolis, St. Louis)
- Running time: 96 minutes
- Country: United States
- Language: English
- Budget: $3 million
- Box office: $4.6 million (U.S.A. Collection)

Force: Five is a 1981 film directed by Robert Clouse. Its stars are Joe Lewis and Bong Soo Han, and it is a loose remake of the 1976 Jim Kelly action film, Hot Potato.

== Plot ==
A top government agent assembles a force of five martial arts experts to carry out a near-impossible assignment. They must topple the corrupt organization behind one of the world's wealthiest and most powerful religious leaders.

== Cast ==
- Joe Lewis as Jim Martin
- Bong Soo Han as Rev. Rhee
- Sonny Barnes as Lockjaw
- Richard Norton as Ezekiel
- Benny Urquidez as Billy Ortega
- Ron Hayden as Willard
- Pam Huntington as Laurie
- Amanda Wyss as Cindy Lester (as Mandy Wyss)
- Joe Corley (uncredited)

== Home media ==
On February 11, 2014, Scorpion Releasing released Force: Five on DVD.
