= Acapulco Gold (1976 film) =

- Theatrical release poster
- Directed by: Burt Brinckerhoff
- Screenplay by: Don Enright; O'Brian Tomalin
- Story by: David Lees; Stan Berkowitz
- Produced by: Allan F. Bodoh; Mitchell Cannold; Bruce Cohn; Michael Leone; Joel Tator
- Starring: Marjoe Gortner; Robert Lansing; Ed Nelson; John Harkins; Randi Oakes; Lawrence P. Casey
- Cinematography: Robert Steadman
- Edited by: John Wright
- Music by: Craig Safan; Gregory Prestopino; John Caper Jr.
- Production companies: Bruce Cohn Productions; Mar Vista Productions
- Distributed by: American Cinema Releasing; R.C. Riddell and Associates
- Release date: June 1, 1976 (United States)
- Running time: 92 minutes
- Country: United States
- Language: English

Acapulco Gold is a 1976 crime film directed by Burt Brinckerhoff and starring Marjoe Gortner and Randi Oakes.

== Premise ==
Insurance salesman Ralph Hollio (Marjoe Gortner) gets arrested for heroin smuggling in Acapulco. Captain Carl Solborg (Robert Lansing) breaks him out of jail to get his help to sail a boat to Hawaii.

== Cast ==
Actor	Role
Marjoe Gortner	Ralph Hollio
Robert Lansing	Captain Carl Solborg
Ed Nelson	D.E.A. Hollister
John Harkins	Morgan Frye
Randi Oakes	Sally Cantrell
Lawrence P. Casey	Gordon
