= Ted Post =

American director (1918–2013)

- Born: Theodore Ian Post; March 31, 1918; Brooklyn, New York, U.S.
- Died: August 20, 2013 (aged 95); Santa Monica, California, U.S.
- Occupation: Director
- Spouse: Thelma Fiefel (m. 1940–2013) (his death)
- Children: 2, including Robert C. Post

Theodore Ian Post (March 31, 1918 – August 20, 2013) was an American film, television, and theatre director. He directed numerous episodes of well-known television series during the 1950s and '60s, and was nominated for a Primetime Emmy and two Directors Guild of America Awards for his work. His feature film directing credits included the Clint Eastwood films Hang 'Em High (1968) and Magnum Force (1973), the Planet of the Apes film Beneath the Planet of the Apes (1970), the Vietnam War film Go Tell the Spartans (1978), and the Chuck Norris action picture Good Guys Wear Black (also 1978).

== Early life ==
Post was born in Brooklyn, New York in 1918, the son of Jacob and Dena Post, Jewish emigrants from the Russian Empire. He started his career in 1938 working as an usher at Loew's Pitkin Theater in Brooklyn. He abandoned plans to become an actor after training with Tamara Daykarhanova, and turned to directing summer theater, where Post began his lengthy association in the director's chair.

== Career ==
=== Theatre ===
Post was a director at the American Negro Theatre during the 1940s. During the Second World War, Post he in the U.S. Army, directing entertainment productions for Special Services in Italy. After his discharge, he returned to directing theatre in New York. During the 1950s, taught acting and drama at New York's High School of Performing Arts in 1950. He persuaded his friend Sidney Lumet to do likewise. Later on in his career, he taught directing at University of California, Los Angeles,

Post directed the 2001–02 Festival of the Arts at American Jewish University.

=== Television ===
Success in the theater led to directorial work in television from the early 1950s, beginning with The Ford Television Theatre. Post directed episodes of many series, including Gunsmoke, Perry Mason, Wagon Train, Rawhide, The Twilight Zone, Combat!, Columbo and 178 episodes of Peyton Place. He also directed TV films (including the original Cagney & Lacey film-of-the-week).

=== Film ===
He also directed feature films, including the second installment of the Planet of the Apes film series, Beneath the Planet of the Apes (1970), Go Tell the Spartans (1978), Good Guys Wear Black (1978), starring Chuck Norris, and two Clint Eastwood films, Hang 'Em High, the movie which launched Clint Eastwood's career as a leading man in American pictures, and Magnum Force.

== Personal life ==
Post married the former Thelma Fiefel (born July 24 1920 died April 16 2026) in 1940. They had two children, one of whom is the law scholar and professor Robert Post.

=== Death ===
Post died aged 95 at the UCLA Medical Center, Santa Monica, California on August 20, 2013.

== Selected filmography ==
=== Film ===
- The Peacemaker (1956)
- The Legend of Tom Dooley (1959)
- Hang 'Em High (1968)
- Beneath the Planet of the Apes (1970)
- The Baby (1973)
- The Harrad Experiment (1973)
- Magnum Force (1973)
- Whiffs (1975)
- Good Guys Wear Black (1978)
- Go Tell the Spartans (1978)
- Nightkill (1980)
- The Human Shield (1991)
- 4 Faces (1999)

=== TV movies ===
- The Great Merlini (1951, pilot)
- Espionage: Far East (1961)
- Night Slaves (1970)
- Dr. Cook's Garden (1971)
- Do Not Fold, Spindle or Mutilate (1971)
- Yuma (1971)
- Five Desperate Women (1971)
- The Bravos (1972)
- Sandcastles (1972)
- The Girls in the Office (1979)
- Diary of a Teenage Hitchhiker (1979)
- Cagney & Lacey (1981)
- Stagecoach (1986)

=== Television ===
- Armstrong Circle Theatre (1952)
- The Ford Television Theatre (1953)
- Schlitz Playhouse of Stars (1953)
- Gunsmoke (1955)
- Medic (1955)
- Zane Grey Theatre (1956)
- Screen Directors Playhouse (1956)
- The 20th Century Fox Hour (1956)
- Sneak Preview (1956)
- Perry Mason (1957)
- Richard Diamond, Private Detective (1957)
- West Point (1957)
- Westinghouse Desilu Playhouse (1958)
- The Rifleman (1958)
- Law of the Plainsman (1959)
- The Westerner (1960)
- Checkmate (1960)
- Startime (1960) (The Young Juggler)
- Wagon Train (1960)
- Insight (1960)
- Alcoa Premiere (1961)
- The Defenders (1961)
- Route 66 (1961)
- The Virginian (1962)
- Combat! (1962)
- Empire (1962)
- Thriller (1961–1962)
- General Electric Theater (1962)
- Bus Stop (1962)
- Rawhide (1960–1962)
- Peyton Place (1964)
- The Twilight Zone (1960–1964)
- Bracken's World (1969)
- Monty Nash (1971)
- Baretta (1975)
- Ark II (1976)
- Columbo (1976)
- Future Cop (1977)
- Beyond Westworld (1980)
- B.A.D. Cats (1980)

=== Short films ===
- The Return of Phileas Fogg (1957)
