= Dogs (1977 film) =

- Film poster
- Directed by: Burt Brinckerhoff
- Written by: O'Brian Tomalin
- Produced by: Allan F. Bodoh; Mitchell Cannold; Bruce Cohn; Michael Leone; Joel Taylor
- Starring: David McCallum; Sandra McCabe; George Wyner; Eric Server; Linda Gray; Dean Santoro; Holly Harris; Sterling Swanson; Barry Greenberg; Michael Davis; Russ Grieve; Cathy Austin; Paul Paolasso; Elizabeth Kerr; Lance Hool; Debbie Davis; Jimmy Stathis; R. A. Rondell
- Cinematography: Robert Steadman
- Edited by: John Wright
- Music by: Alan Oldfield
- Production companies: Bruce Cohn Productions; La Quinta Partnership; Mar Vista Productions
- Distributed by: R.C. Riddell and Associates (United States); Warner-Columbia Filmverleih (Germany); Columbia Pictures (Australia)
- Release date: February 23, 1977
- Running time: 90 minutes
- Country: United States
- Languages: English; French

Dogs is a 1977 American natural horror film directed by Burt Brinckerhoff about a pack of dogs that go on a killing spree.

== Plot ==
Harlan Thompson (David McCallum) is the head of the biology department at Southwestern University, a small school located in an isolated southern California town. Though he dresses casually and socializes with the students, he is frequently at odds with his fellow professors and the administrators, viewing them as shallow, elitist snobs who are more interested in status than education. However, he takes a semi-liking to a young and newly hired biology professor, Michael Fitzgerald (George Wyner), and tries to stop him from being sucked into the system. The only other SU employee whom Harlan seems to have any use for is his ex-girlfriend Caroline Donaghue (Sandra McCabe). The two have recently broken up, but remain on good terms.

Recently, several cows belonging to local rancher Larry Ludecky (Larry Gene Darnell) have been found dead. Harlan suspects that they have been killed by coyotes, but rules that out upon examining the cows. Larry says that he is going to wait with a rifle and shoot the animals who have been killing his cows if they return. Disregarding a warning from Harlan, Larry goes ahead with his plan and is killed by a pack of dogs. Shortly afterward, dogs also kill an SU student and an elderly lady.

Harlan and Michael discuss the evidence and conclude that the killings were committed by dogs, who have formed packs via Michael's theory that pheromones cause animals of a particular species to unite and act as one. The pheromones may be coming from a top-secret government experiment being conducted at a linear accelerator near the school. Harlan and Michael share their conclusion with the SU president, Dr. Martin Koppelman (Sterling Swanson), and ask him to warn people to keep their dogs home at night. Koppelman, believing that Harlan and Michael are wrong, declines their request. Harlan says he will give them a warning himself, and Koppelman threatens him with firing if he does.

However, at the same time, a local kindergarten class is having a dog show, at which the dogs pack and attack the people. While no one is seriously injured, the town now becomes aware of the dog packs. Several men form a posse to hunt the dogs. Sheriff Jimmy Goodman (Eric Server) discourages them, but they insist, and he ends up joining them.

Harlan and Michael attempt to perform a pheromone experiment on a dog inside a plastic encasement. If it works, they plan to have a stronger pheromone sprayed into the area to stop the packs. But as they are about to start the experiment, the dog breaks through the plastic amid a nearby pack. Meanwhile, the posse is attacked by a pack, killing everyone but Jimmy, who flees the scene. But before he gets to his car, he is attacked also, dropping his gun. After suffering severe injuries, he stops the attack by picking up his gun and shooting the dog, but collapses and dies upon reaching his car.

Meanwhile, SU professor Dr. Charles Aintry (Dean Santoro), brings fellow professor Charlotte Ingle (Linda Gray) home from a date. He asks to go inside, but she declines, and he expresses suspicion that she does not want to see him anymore. She implies that she is not romantically interested in him and goes inside, while he leaves, feeling dejected. Then, while taking a shower, she is killed by a dog.

Harlan and Michael arrive at the police station and find a man dead. They call Jimmy on the radio. Getting no response, they each grab a rifle and leave. As they pass Koppelman's house, they see him being attacked by a dog. Seeing Harlan and Michael, Koppelman asks them to shoot the dog. Michael shoots, but accidentally shoots and kills Koppelman. Harlan then shoots and kills the dog. Michael is traumatized upon realizing that he killed Koppelman, but Harlan calms Michael down. The two then find Mrs. Koppelman (Holly Harris) dead in the swimming pool.

Michael says that he will warn the students and tells Harlan to check on Caroline, and that Harlan and Michael will later meet at the dorm. Harlan tells Michael to take Koppelman's car, which he does.

Harlan arrives at Caroline's house and tells her that they need to evacuate. A few seconds later, as the howling of dogs is heard in the far distance, her dog begins trembling.

Back at SU, Michael gathers the students in the lobby of the dorm. He tells them about the dog attacks, that he will walk them over to the library in five minutes, and that the campus will be evacuated in the morning. The students do not take Michael seriously, but grudgingly agree to his orders. One of the students named Cory tells Michael that Cory's roommate, the overweight Howard Kaplan (Barry Greenberg), was hungry and went to the cafeteria. There, Howard finds milk and rolls, but is quickly confronted by some barking dogs. Michael arrives and tells the panicked Howard to throw the food to the dogs, which he does. Two of the dogs goes after the food and Michael attempts to shoot the other. He turns out to be out of bullets, but he disables the dog by striking it with the rifle. He and Howard leave and head for the dorm.

Back at the dorm, the students, having concluded that Michael has forgotten about them, walk to the library themselves.

Back at Caroline's house, as Caroline goes to get dressed, she screams. A dog walks into the living room, and is quickly shot and killed by Harlan. However, several more dogs enter within a few seconds. Harlan and Caroline, holding her dog, exit the house.

Michael and Howard arrive back at the dorm, finding it abandoned. Meanwhile, the other students are attacked by a pack of dogs and most of them barely escape into the library.

In Caroline's garage, Harlan and Caroline board the door into the house. As they get into Caroline's car to leave, along with her dog, Caroline realizes that she left the keys in the house. Harlan tries to hotwire the car, but before he succeeds, the sound of the dogs stop. Harlan and Caroline go to the door from the garage to the house, but Harlan then decides that they should not go in. A few seconds later, a dog starts to enter through a doggy door. Harlan boards it, but then dogs try to enter through another doggy door. One of the dogs grabs Harlan by the leg and starts to pull on him, but he is rescued by Caroline and the two take refuge in the car. One of the dogs then tears through the wall and the pack enters.

Back at SU, Michael and Howard are close to the library when they find two of the students dead. Howard panics and runs toward the library. Michael warns him to watch out. Howard desperately begs the students to let him in. However, a large dog jumps on him, knocking him through the glass door, and allowing the pack to enter. They presumably kill all the students. After the dogs leave, Michael finds the dead students in and near the library and looks resigned and realizing that he failed to evacuate the students.

Harlan and Caroline are chased by the dogs but they are able to drive away. Seeing a college police car on the side of the road, they stop and see three dead bodies, one of them being Michael. And now Harlan looks resigned too. Harlan and Caroline drive away in their car, and the man on the radio tells them that dog attacks very similar are happening in neighboring communities and that dogs were the only species in the attacks. While they are driving away, however, a cat makes a threatening sound.

== Production ==
Principal photography began at Chula Vista, California and was completed in June 1976.

== Critical reception ==
Gene Siskel of the Chicago Tribune gave the film zero stars out of four, noting that every dog attack scene was "photographed the same way" and writing that "we are supposed to believe that our own little pets can become unhinged killers when they smell something. I didn't buy it the film is bad and It's not real." Kevin Thomas of the Los Angeles Times called it "the latest exploitation picture in which beasts turn upon men. Along with the obligatory grisly special effects this efficiently made little film generates a fair amount of tension and is reasonably diverting. It's one of the better efforts in the genre."

== Home video releases ==
Dogs was released on VHS in 1988 under the alternate title Slaughter. On July 25, 2006, Dogs was released on DVD by Scorpion Releasing under its original title. The DVD also includes a newly filmed 19-minute documentary on the film, including interviews with director Burt Brinckerhoff and actors George Wyner and Eric Server. Also included are the theatrical trailer and a TV spot.

The film was released on Blu-ray on March 11, 2014, by the same company and with the same bonus materials as the 2006 DVD release.
