= Go Tell the Spartans =

1978 film directed by Ted Post

- Theatrical poster
- Directed by: Ted Post
- Written by: Wendell Mayes
- Based on: Incident at Muc Wa (1967 novel) by Daniel Ford
- Produced by: Allan F. Bodoh; Mitchell Cannold
- Starring: Burt Lancaster; Craig Wasson; Marc Singer; Jonathan Goldsmith
- Cinematography: Harry Stradling Jr.
- Edited by: Millie Moore
- Music by: Dick Halligan
- Production companies: Mar Vista Productions; Spartan Productions
- Distributed by: AVCO Embassy Pictures (US/Canada); United Artists (International)
- Release date: June 14, 1978
- Running time: 114 minutes
- Country: United States
- Language: English
- Budget: $1.5 million

Go Tell the Spartans is a 1978 American war film directed by Ted Post, from a screenplay by Wendell Mayes, and starring Burt Lancaster, Craig Wasson, Marc Singer and Jonathan Goldsmith. The film is based on Daniel Ford's 1967 novel Incident at Muc Wa about U.S. Army military advisors during the early part of the Vietnam War in 1964, when Ford was a correspondent in Vietnam for The Nation.

The film was released by Avco Embassy Pictures on June 14, 1978. Despite limited publicity, it received generally positive reviews, and has been noted for its antiwar themes. Critic Stanley Kauffmann considered it "the best [film] so far on the Vietnam War," and David Thomson wrote that it is "a pitiless survey of an insane, inept, and criminal incursion on history."

== Plot ==
In 1964, Major Asa Barker, a weary veteran of World War II and the Korean War, is given command of a poorly-manned US Army advisor outpost overlooking three villages in South Vietnam. He is ordered to reoccupy a nearby deserted hamlet named Muc Wa on the Da Nang-to-Phnom Penh highway where a massacre of French colonial troops had occurred a decade before, during the First Indochina War.

Barker and his executive officer, the career-oriented Captain Olivetti, order four replacements to accomplish the mission. Second Lieutenant Hamilton hopes that volunteering for Vietnam is an opportunity for promotion. Burnt-out First Sergeant Oleozewski served with Barker in Korea, and has already done three tours in Vietnam. Corporal Abraham Lincoln is a combat medic and a drug addict. The fourth man mystifies Barker. Draftee Corporal Courcey is a demolitions expert who extended his enlistment by six months to serve in Vietnam. Barker sends the new men with Corporal Ackley, a communications expert, to garrison Muc Wa with a half-French, half-Vietnamese interpreter/interrogation specialist named "Cowboy" Nguyen, and a squad of Hmong mercenaries and twenty South Vietnamese Popular Force troops.

The group encounters a booby-trapped roadblock on the road to Muc Wa, and captures a lone Viet Cong soldier who refuses to divulge information and is killed by Cowboy. At the hamlet, Hamilton follows Oleozewski's advice so the unit can be resupplied by helicopter. Courcey discovers a graveyard containing 302 French soldiers killed by the Viet Minh. He translates a French inscription at the entrance as "Go, tell the Spartans, stranger passing by, that here, obedient to their laws, we lie" which references the Battle of Thermopylae. Courcey spots a one-eyed VC soldier scouting the area.

A patrol led by Courcey unexpectedly finds Vietnamese women and children, despite intelligence denying the presence of civilians in the area. Lincoln is wounded that evening by a VC attack on Muc Wa, and Courcey leads an ambush patrol that kills a VC mortar crew. One of the female civilians is among the dead. When Barker meets Colonel Minh, the regional military leader, in Saigon, he requests three hundred ARVN troops for Muc Wa. Minh refuses, claiming that the troops are needed to prevent a potential coup in Saigon. He then offers the reinforcements, in exchange for 1,500 artillery shells.

Muc Wa is attacked again, and Lieutenant Hamilton is killed after ignoring Oleonozski's warnings against trying to rescue a wounded man left behind by a combat patrol. Oleonozski commits suicide the next day. Barker requests a withdrawal of the US advisors from Muc Wa, but General Harnitz refuses, and Barker reluctantly sends Olivetti to take command at Muc Wa. The outpost is hit again by an unexpectedly strong Viet Cong attack. Only the arrival of US helicopter gunships saves the outpost from being overrun.

Harnitz finally orders Barker to withdraw all American troops from Muc Wa, as it's believed to soon be besieged by the 1,000-strong 507th Viet Cong battalion. The South Vietnamese and walking wounded are to be abandoned. Barker volunteers to stay and help evacuate these people. Cowboy kills some Vietnamese civilians who Courcey brought into the base camp after they stole weapons and tried to escape. A teenage girl who Courcey tried to befriend escapes and informs the VC of the Americans' evacuation plans. Barker and Courcey begin the withdrawal after dark, while under cover of artillery fire. The group is ambushed and Barker is killed by the waiting VC, who are led by the teenaged girl. A wounded Courcey, the only survivor, is hidden in bushes by an elderly militiaman.

The next day, Courcey finds Barker and the South Vietnamese soldiers stripped of their uniforms and weapons. Courcey staggers into the French graveyard where he encounters the one-eyed VC scout. The badly wounded VC raises his rifle at Courcey, then drops it, exhausted. Courcey wanders out of the graveyard onto the dirt road leading away from the ruins of Muc Wa.

== Cast ==
- Burt Lancaster as Maj. Asa Barker
- Craig Wasson as Cpl. Courcey
- Jonathan Goldsmith as CSM Oleonowski
- Marc Singer as Capt. Olivetti
- Joe Unger as Lt. Hamilton
- Dennis Howard as Cpl. Abraham Lincoln
- David Clennon as Lt. Finley Wattsberg
- Evan C. Kim as Cpl. "Cowboy" Nguyen
- John Megna as Cpl. Ackley
- Hilly Hicks as Signalman Toffee
- Dolph Sweet as Gen. Harnitz
- Clyde Kusatsu as Col. "Lard Ass" Minh
- James Hong as Pvt. "Old Man"
- Denice Kumagai as "Butterfly"
- Tad Horino as "One-eyed Charlie" (Vietcong scout)
- Phong Diep as Minh's Interpreter
- Ralph Brannen as Col. Minh's ADC
- Mark Carlton as Capt. Schlitz
- Dabney Coleman as Helicopter Pilot (uncredited)

== Production ==
=== Development and writing ===
Screenwriter Wendell Mayes was fascinated with the Vietnam War. He optioned the novel with his own money and tried to finance it as a film, but was rejected by all major studios, including Paramount and 20th Century Fox. "This was the first thing that I optioned that finally did go," he said. "It was also one that I was in love with. I could see how the relationships of the people who were in the novel could be turned into a story, a war picture that could really get hold of you."

The story was inspired by a futile 1964 special-forces operation at Tan Hoa in the Central Highlands of Vietnam, an objective that turned out to be an abandoned settlement containing only a field, an abandoned airstrip, and three or four French gravestones. The graves inspired the film's title, taken from Simonides's epitaph to the 300 soldiers killed in the Battle of Thermopylae against the Persians in 480 B.C.: "Go tell the Spartans, stranger passing by, that here, obedient to their laws, we lie." The film's name is a foreshadowing of the narrative arc, as the soldiers–like the Spartans at Thermopylae–are sent to their deaths.

Unlike the elite US Army Special Forces of Ford's original novel, whom he called the "US Army Raiders," Mayes' screenplay involving Military Assistance Advisory Group military advisors focuses on a collection of misfits. A female reporter character in the novel was removed from the screenplay. Mayes later said "The script isn't faithful to the book at all, incidentally, but the novelist loved the movie. I sent him the script, and he wrote me a little note, saying he wished his novel was as good as my screenplay."

In 1977, the producers sought assistance from the U.S. Army, which responded that assistance would only be forthcoming if modifications to the script and characters were made. The Army insisted that its advisors in South Vietnam in 1964 were "virtually all outstanding individuals, handpicked for their jobs, and quite experienced ... [I]n presenting an offhand collection of losers, it is totally unrealistic of the Army in Vietnam in that period".

=== Casting ===
Various older leading men such as Robert Mitchum, William Holden and Paul Newman were also offered the role of Major Asa Barker.

Director Ted Post persuaded Avco Embassy Pictures to produce the film on a limited budget. He sent the script to a friend of Burt Lancaster, then 65 years old, who was recuperating from a knee injury (his character limps throughout the film). Calling the script brilliant, Lancaster agreed to star in it, and when the 31-day production budget ran short, he paid $150,000 to complete it.

The younger actors cast were Marc Singer as infantry Captain Al Olivetti, a gung-ho career officer seeking to earn the Combat Infantryman Badge, and Craig Wasson as Corporal Courcey, the idealistic college-educated draftee who wants to see what a real war is like.

=== Filming ===
The film was made on-location in Valencia, California. 60 local Vietnamese refugees were hired to play Vietcong and South Vietnamese soldiers.

The production ran out of budget near the end of filming, and Burt Lancaster used his own money to complete the picture.

== Release ==
Go Tell the Spartans was released in the United States on June 14, 1978. In the Philippines, the film was released by Transamerica on November 14, 1978.

Eight years after its release, the film gained renewed attention after the release of Oliver Stone's Platoon, and it was re-released on September 7, 1987.

=== Home media ===
The film was released on VHS cassette on May 13, 1992. It was released on DVD by HBO Home Video (through Warner Home Video) on August 30, 2005 and as a limited-edition Blu-ray by Scorpion Releasing in June 2016.

== Reception ==
=== Critical response ===
Though the film had a limited release in the United States, critics, especially those opposed to the Vietnam War, praised it: "In sure, swift strokes", wrote Arthur Schlesinger Jr. in the Saturday Review, "it shows the irrelevance of the American presence in Vietnam, the corruption wrought by that irrelevance, and the fortuity, cruelty, and waste of an irrelevant war." Stanley Kauffmann of The New Republic wrote in June 1978- 'This is the best film I've seen to date about the Vietnam War excepting two documentaries. Roger Grooms, in the Cincinnati Enquirer, judged it to be "one of the noblest films, ever, about men in crisis". On Rotten Tomatoes, the film has a score of 67% based on 6 reviews.

Over time, the previously overlooked film became an antiwar classic. At one of its revivals, it was described as:

A cult fave – and deservedly so – Go Tell the Spartans was hard-headed and brutally realistic about our dead-end presence in Vietnam; released the same year as Coming Home (United Artists) and The Deer Hunter (EMI Films released by Universal Pictures), the film won critical admiration, but audiences preferred individualised sagas, sentiment, and romantic melodrama. Rather than tackle the effects of the war on physically and emotionally wounded vets, this brave film exposed the fundamental, tactical lunacy of the war as perceived by an American officer (Burt Lancaster) who knows better, but must follow through on stupid, self-destructive orders from above. This is one of Lancaster's best performances: embittered, a cog in the military juggernaut, this good man foresees the killing waste to come.

In 2023, film critic David Thomson wrote that the film "remains exemplary as a pitiless survey of an insane, inept, and criminal incursion on history."

=== Awards and nominations ===
In 1979, Wendell Mayes' screenplay was nominated for the Writers Guild of America Award for "Best Drama Adapted from Another Medium (Screen)".
