= Dinny =

Dinny is a given name. Notable people with the name include:

- Dinny Allen (born 1952), retired Gaelic football manager and former dual player
- Dinny Barry-Murphy (1904–1973), famous Irish sportsperson
- Dinny Cahill (born 1952), Irish hurling manager and former player
- Dinny Campbell or John Campbell (rugby) (1889–1966), national representative for Australia in rugby union
- Chuck "Dinny" Dinsmore or Charles Dinsmore (1903–1982), Canadian professional ice hockey player
- Dinny Doyle or Denis Doyle (born 1900), Irish football wing half
- Dinny Falvey, Gaelic footballer from Annascaul in County Kerry
- Dinny Hannon, Irish footballer who played as an inside-right
- Dinny Kelleher (born 1902), Australian rules footballer
- Dinny Lacey (1890–1923), Irish Republican Army officer during the Irish War of Independence
- Dinny Long (born 1949), Irish retired sportsperson
- Dinny Love or Eden Love (1909–1991), Australian Rugby Union player
- Dinny Lowry (1934–2025), Irish soccer player
- Dinny Lutge or Denis Lutge (1879–1953), pioneer Australian rugby league and rugby union player
- Dinny McGinley (born 1945), Irish Fine Gael politician
- Dinny McNamara (1905–1963), American football and baseball player and coach
- Dinny Meehan (1889–1920), the leader of the White Hand Gang in the 1910s
- Dinny O'Brien or Denis O'Brien (1898–1942), veteran of the Easter Rising, the Irish War of Independence, and the Irish Civil War
- Dinny Pails (1921–1986), former Australian tennis champion
- Denis Ryan (footballer) (1916–1980), Australian rules footballer
- Dinny Ryan (hurler) (1927–2009), Irish hurler for Tipperary

== See also ==
- Dinny and the Witches, satirical comedy written by William Gibson in 1948
- Dinny the Dinosaur or Cabazon Dinosaurs, enormous, sculptured roadside attractions located in Cabazon, California

- Dennis
- DYNY (disambiguation)
- Dienné
- Dinay
- Donnay
- Denis (disambiguation)
- Danny (disambiguation)
- Denney (disambiguation)
- Denny (disambiguation)
- Dini (disambiguation)
- Tinney (disambiguation)
