= Light of the Diddicoy =

Light of the Diddicoy is a 2014 historical novel. It is the first in a series called Auld Irishtown by author Eamon Loingsigh. It was published by Three Rooms Press.

== Plot ==
The novel is told by William "Liam" Garrihy many years after his time as a teenage member of a Brooklyn longshoremen gang. Garrihy's father listens to a stirring speech given at Glasnevin Cemetery in August 1915 for the Fenian rebel Jeremiah O'Donovan Rossa. Realizing that an uprising is coming soon, he sends his younger son to New York to work with his brother Joseph, a recruiter for the International Longshoremen's Association in Brooklyn.

After a tumultuous journey by sea in steerage of a transport steamer, Liam's last name is changed from Garrihy to Garrity at Ellis Island. He immediately becomes sick in Brooklyn and, at his uncle Joseph's beckoning, drinks mulled ale and home-brewed poteen. After vomiting, his drunken uncle throws him out in the cold.

Homeless in Brooklyn, Liam squats in an abandoned building on Flatbush Avenue with other children and meets a member of Richie "Pegleg" Lonergan's gang, who steals his coat. Starving and cold, Liam attempts to steal from a dray and is taken away by Vincent Maher, a member of the White Hand Gang. The two go to the wake of Maher's friend, McGowan. There, Liam meets Dinny Meehan, leader of the White Hand Gang.

Liam is then initiated into the gang and learns that it is under attack by many elements including the local police in William Brosnan, the New York Dock Company, the South Brooklyn Italian Black Hand as well as "Wild Bill" Lovett, a dockboss who wants to take the gang over from Meehan. Since the ILA is also an enemy of the gang, Meehan wants to use Liam's relationship to "get" his uncle Joseph, who is an ILA recruiter.

In April 1916, Liam is in Greenwich Village with Meehan when news of the Easter Rising in Dublin reaches him. He fears for the safety of his mother and sisters. Meehan then promises to help him get them to New York as long as Liam provides access to his uncle. Meehan then strikes out against the gang's enemies in a series of violent attacks which secure the White Hand Gang's status at the top of the labor racket.
