= Two for the Seesaw =

Two for the Seesaw may refer to:

- Two for the Seesaw (play), a 1958 play by William Gibson
- Two for the Seesaw (film), a 1962 film based on the play
