= William Lovett (disambiguation) =

William Lovett may refer to:

- William Lovett (1800–1877), British activist
- Bill Lovett (1894–1923), Irish American gangster, also known as Wild Bill
- Billy Lovett (1894–1965), English footballer for Blackpool and numerous other clubs (see List of Rochdale A.F.C. players (25–99 appearances))
