= Anthony Carfano =

American gangster

- Born: November 1895; Manhattan, New York, U.S.
- Died: September 25, 1959 (aged 63); Queens, New York, U.S.
- Cause of death: Assassination by gunshot.
- Other name: Little Augie Pisano
- Allegiance: Luciano crime family

Details
- States: Florida, New York

Anthony Carfano (November 1895 – September 25, 1959), also known as "Little Augie Pisano", was a New York gangster who became a caporegime (captain) in the Luciano crime family under mob bosses Charles "Lucky" Luciano and Frank Costello.

== Early life ==
Anthony Carfano was born in November 1895 on Oliver Street in Manhattan, the son of Giovanni Carfagno and Dongetta Visocchi, both immigrants from Naples, Italy.

== Criminal career ==
By 1920, he had become a hoodlum for Frankie Yale in Yale's south Brooklyn empire. Yale's organization eventually allied with and was finally absorbed by Joe Masseria's Mafia family, making Yale a caporegime, or crew leader, under Masseria. When Yale was assassinated in 1928, Carfano took over and became a Masseria caporegime. In the late 1930s, Costello and Joe Adonis sent Carfano to South Florida to expand family operations in that region. Based in Miami, Carfano successfully organized both illegal gambling operations and legitimate spas and hotels, including Miami's Wofford Hotel.

At this time, mob associate and Florida gambling operator Meyer Lansky persuaded the Mafia Commission that both Miami and Miami Beach should be considered "open cities", places in which any crime family in the country could set up operation. Despite Carfano's objections, Costello persuaded him to cooperate with Lansky. By the late 1950s, Carfano had carved out a multi-million dollar gambling empire in South Florida. Florida crime boss Santo Trafficante Sr., based in Tampa, controlled the majority of the state, but was closely aligned with the New York bosses and his counterparts in New Orleans. In a show of support for Costello, Carfano flew to New York from Florida to meet with him. In retaliation for supporting Costello, Vito Genovese ordered his right-hand-man and caporegime Anthony "Tony Bender" Strollo to murder Carfano.

In 1946 he attended the Havana Conference in Cuba.

== Assassination ==
On the night of September 25, 1959 (some sources incorrectly claim September 29), Strollo invited Carfano to dinner at Marino's restaurant and Carfano accepted. Earlier that night, Carfano relaxed at the Copacabana nightclub and later that evening, left to meet with Strollo. At Marino's, Carfano ran into mutual friends, among them Janice Drake, a former Miss New Jersey and the wife of comedian Allan Drake. Drake had been previously called in as a witness to testify on gangland slayings of Manhattan Nathan Nelson and Gambino crime family boss Albert Anastasia. Carfano offered to drive Janice home after supper to her apartment in Rego Park, Queens, where her 13-year-old son, Michael, was sleeping.

In the middle of the meal, Carfano allegedly received a phone call. After hanging up, Carfano told his group that he and Drake had to leave; he had been called away "on urgent business". Carfano and Drake left Marino's and drove away in his Cadillac. Police later theorized that this phone call was from Costello warning Carfano about the hit. When Carfano and Drake left the restaurant, they were allegedly heading to La Guardia Airport in Queens to board a flight to Miami. However, according to this theory, Strollo had anticipated such a move and had hidden gunmen in the back seat of the Cadillac. Once on the road, the gunmen forced Carfano to drive to a quiet location near the airport. At 10:30 that evening, 45 minutes after Carfano and Drake left Marino's, their bodies were found in Carfano's car near the airport. Both had been shot in the head.

=== Alternate assassination theory ===
Another theory regarding Carfano's death lies with his vast gambling empire in South Florida and a belief he was making moves to invest in Cuban casinos at the time of his death. With the emergence of Genovese as the new leader of the Luciano crime family in late 1957, former boss Luciano lost a great deal of underworld influence in New York and America. No longer in control of his crime family, longtime Luciano ally and supporter Meyer Lansky, who had vast gambling interests across America, along with casino interests in Las Vegas and Cuba, was in need of a new sponsor and ally within the former Luciano family. Luciano and Costello had given Lansky underworld protection for decades. Now Lansky sought an alliance with new boss Vito Genovese.

Underworld rumor has it that after Costello was deposed as boss of the Luciano crime family in late 1957, Carfano took it upon himself to show disregard and even contempt for the new leadership. He apparently spent most of his time overseeing his criminal and legitimate interests in South Florida and traveled to New York only when necessary, and by 1959 had begun making plans to expand his gambling operations into Cuba. The theory goes that Carfano, who was not a Genovese supporter, began to encroach on the Havana casino operations of Meyer Lansky and the new Genovese crime family.

Carfano's prior, blatant disrespect for his new boss, Genovese, and now his encroachment onto Genovese and Lansky territory without permission sealed Carfano's fate. This, along with the added bonus that Lansky would take over all the Carfano gambling interests in Florida where Lansky was also based gave the two New York Mob bosses all the excuse they needed to have Carfano hit. The fact that Lansky's criminal association with Genovese strengthened after his takeover of the Luciano crime family and that Lansky did in fact take over Carfano's Southern Florida gambling interests after his death is likely the catalyst for this theory surrounding Carfano's murder and Lansky's involvement.
