= List of compositions by André Previn =

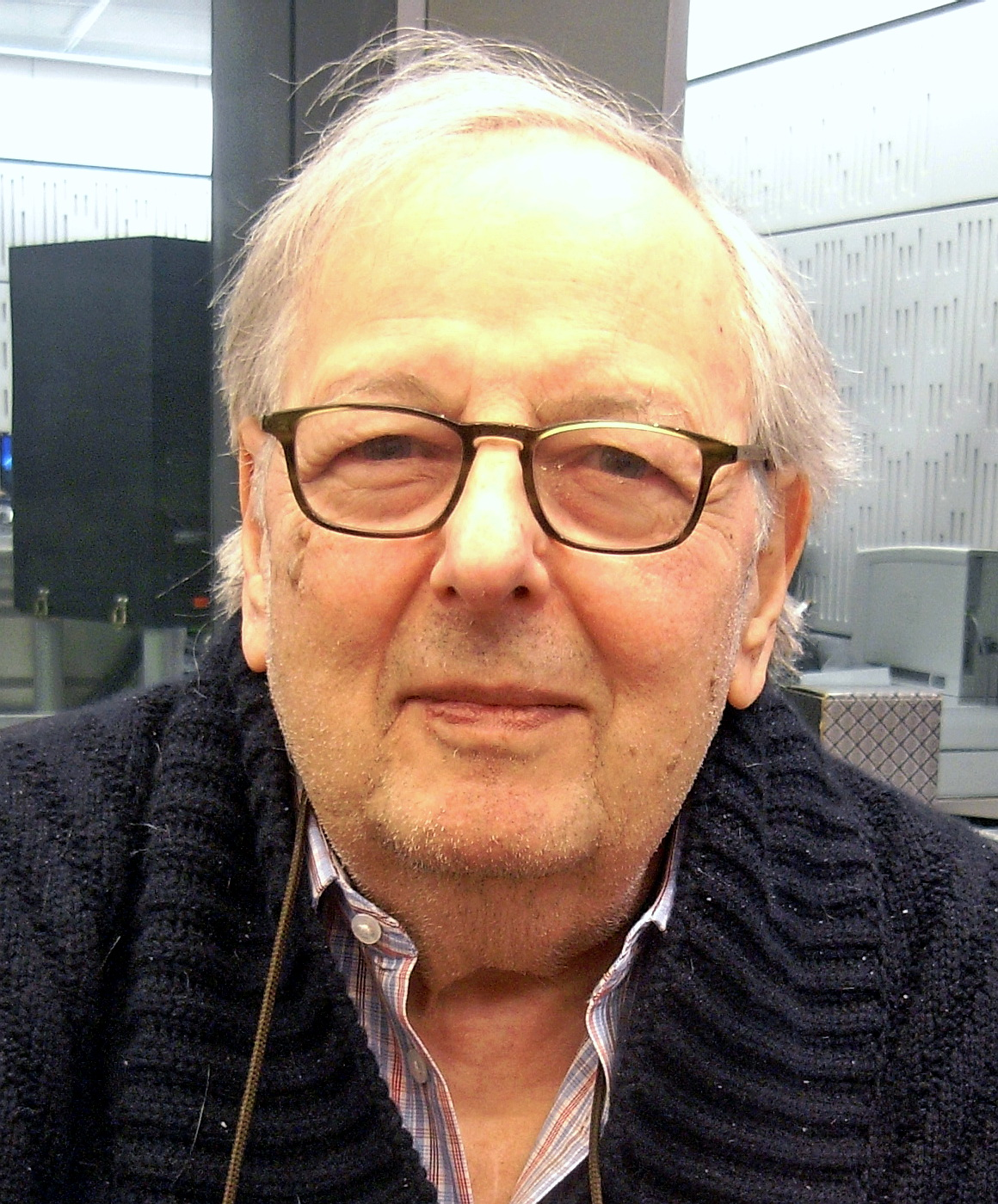
Previn in 2012.

André Previn (1929–2019) had composed film scores (including songs), jazz pieces and contemporary classical music. His earliest compositions known at least by name/type are student works from the mid-1940s (a clarinet sonata, a string quartet, a rhapsody for violin and orchestra and some art songs). They were written at the same time as he did his first work for the movies (1946) and his first jazz recordings (1945).

He composed the music for the film musical It's Always Fair Weather (1955), and music for five new songs written with Alan Jay Lerner for the film Paint Your Wagon (1969).

In Hollywood between 1946 and 1969, Previn also worked extensively as an adaptor, winning his four Academy Awards (out of 13 nominations) for works in this category: Gigi (Original score by Frederick Loewe for the film), Porgy and Bess (stage-to-film adaptation of George Gershwin's opera score), Irma la Douce (the film used the score of the stage musical by Marguerite Monnot, but the songs themselves were omitted) and My Fair Lady (stage-to-film adaptation of Fredrick Loewe's musical score). While working as an adaptor, Previn regularly modified the original compositions. At times, he was adding some own music, orchestrating, conducting and playing piano, as well.

In later years, he had concentrated on composing contemporary classical music. In this field, Previn's works as a composer "combine expressionistic harmony with a strong tendency towards tonality. They are rhythmic and metrically complex, marvelously orchestrated, and include flashes of idioms associated with jazz and symphonic film music. Despite the crossover appeal that Previn's art music provokes in the ears of many commentators, Previn does not see himself as a postmodern musician, trying to mix musical styles and elements to create new kinds of aesthetic experiences." For example, he collaborated with Tom Stoppard on Every Good Boy Deserves Favour, a play with substantial musical content, which was first performed in London in 1977 with Previn conducting the LSO. His first opera, A Streetcar Named Desire, premiered at the San Francisco Opera in 1998. It quickly developed into one of the most widely played contemporary operas. His second opera, Brief Encounter, based on the 1945 movie of the same name, was premiered at Houston Grand Opera on May 1, 2009. His numerous other contemporary classical works include vocal, chamber, and orchestral music. His contemporary classical music was premiered by artists like Vladimir Ashkenazy, Janet Baker, Yuri Bashmet, Renée Fleming, Yo-Yo Ma, Anne-Sophie Mutter, Itzhak Perlman, John Williams, the Emerson String Quartet, the Boston Symphony Orchestra, the Leipzig Gewandhaus Orchestra, the London Symphony Orchestra, the New York Philharmonic, the Philadelphia Orchestra, the Pittsburgh Symphony Orchestra and the Vienna Philharmonic. The closest working relationships with regard to Previn's contemporary classical music are with violinist Anne-Sophie Mutter, having premiered eight works between 2001 and 2015, and with the Boston Symphony Orchestra, having premiered (as an ensemble or with smaller groups or soloists from its ranks) nine works between 1996 and 2012.

== Catalog raisonné ==
For a full catalog raisonné containing the dates, places and participants of premieres as well as the names and sources for lost works (especially the early chamber and orchestral music), abandoned works (like the opera Silk or the film score to Goodbye, Mr. Chips), rejected works (like the film score to See No Evil) and withdrawn works (like the Cello Concerto No. 1) see Frédéric Döhl: André Previn. Musikalische Vielseitigkeit und ästhetische Erfahrung, Stuttgart 2012, p. 279-294.

== Opera ==
- A Streetcar Named Desire (written in 1995, premiered and filmed in San Francisco in 1998)
- Brief Encounter (2007, premiered and recorded by Deutsche Grammophon in Houston in 2009)

== Theater ==
- A Party with Betty Comden & Adolph Green (1958) – a revue with Previn as featured songwriter
- Coco (premiered in New York 1969) – a musical with lyrics and book by Alan Jay Lerner
- The Good Companions (premiered in London 1974) – a musical with a book by Ronald Harwood and lyrics by Johnny Mercer
- Incidental Music for Every Good Boy Deserves Favour (premiered in London 1977) – a play for actors and orchestra with words by Tom Stoppard

== Orchestral music (selection) ==
- Overture to a Comedy (premiered in Los Angeles in 1963)
- Cello Concerto No. 1 (written possibly as early as 1960; premiered in Houston in 1968; later withdrawn by the composer)
- Violin Concerto No. 1 (1969, never published)
- Guitar Concerto (written in 1970; premiered in London the next year)
- Principals for Orchestra (premiered in Pittsburgh in 1980)
- Reflections for English Horn (or Cello) and Orchestra (premiered at Saratoga Springs in 1981)
- Piano Concerto (written in 1984; premiered in London the next year)
- Diversions for Orchestra (premiered in Salzburg, Austria, in 2000)
- Violin Concerto No. 2 "Anne-Sophie" (written in 1999, published in 2001 and premiered in Boston in 2002)
- Night Thoughts for Orchestra (premiered in Sacramento in 2006)
- Double Concerto No. 1 for Violin, Double Bass and Orchestra (2004; premiered in Boston in 2007)
- Harp Concerto (premiered in Pittsburgh in 2007)
- Owls for Orchestra (premiered in Boston in 2008)
- Double Concerto No. 2 for Violin, Viola and Orchestra (premiered in New York in 2009)
- Cello Concerto No. 2 (premiered in Leipzig in 2011)
- Triple Concerto for French Horn, Trumpet and Tuba (premiered in Pittsburgh in 2012)
- Music for Boston for Orchestra (premiered at Tanglewood in 2012)
- Violin Concerto No. 3 with two Harpsichord Interludes (requires only a string orchestra; published in 2010 and premiered by Anne-Sophie Mutter in Trondheim, Norway, two years later)
- Music for Wind Orchestra (No Strings Attached) (premiered in Rochester, NY, in 2014)
- Double Concerto No. 3 for Violin, Cello and Orchestra (premiered in Cincinnati in 2014)
- Can Spring Be Far Behind? for Orchestra (premiered in Greensboro, NC, in 2016)
- Concerto for Orchestra (written in 2016; premiered in Kalamazoo in 2022)
- Almost an Overture for Orchestra (premiered in Newport, RI, in 2017)

== Chamber music (selection) ==
- Violin Sonata No. 1 (ca. 1960, possibly rejected by the composer)
- Four Outings for Brass (premiered in London in 1974)
- Two Little Serenades for Violin and Piano (premiered in New York in 1974)
- Peaches for Flute and Piano (ca. 1978)
- Triolet for Brass (ca. 1985)
- A Wedding Waltz for 2 Oboes and Piano (ca. 1986)
- Sonata for Cello and Piano (premiered in Amsterdam in 1993)
- Trio for Piano, Oboe and Bassoon (premiered in New York in 1996)
- Sonata (No. 2) Vineyard for Violin and Piano (written in 1994, premiered in New York in 1996)
- Sonata for Bassoon and Piano (premiered in New York in 1999)
- Tango, Song and Dance, for Violin and Piano (premiered in Luzern, Switzerland, in 2001)
- String Quartet with Soprano (premiered in New York in 2003)
- Trio for Piano, Violin and Cello (premiered in New York in 2009)
- Sonata for Clarinet and Piano (premiered in Prague, Czech Republic, in 2010)
- Octet for Eleven (premiered in Boston in 2010)
- Quintet for Clarinet and String Quartet (premiered in Boston in 2011)
- Trio (No. 2) for Piano, Violin and Cello (premiered in New York in 2012)
- Sonata (No. 3, publ. as "No. 2") for Violin and Piano (premiered in New York in 2013)
- Nonet (premiered in Edinburgh in 2015)
- Morning Rain and Warm Evening for Violin and Piano (not yet premiered)

== Solo piano music (selection) ==
- Impressions for Piano (20 pieces for students) (ca. 1964)
- Paraphrase on a Theme of William Walton (premiered in London, United Kingdom, in 1973)
- Invisible Drummer. Five Preludes (premiered in Liverpool, United Kingdom, in 1974)
- Five Pages from My Calendar (ca. 1978)
- Matthew's Piano Book (10 pieces for students) (ca. 1979)
- Variations on a Theme by Haydn (ca. 1990)

== Songs and song cycles ==
- Five Songs, Texts by Philip Larkin (premiered in London, United Kingdom, in 1977)
- Honey and Rue for Soprano, Jazz Band and Orchestra, Texts by Toni Morrison (premiered in New York in 1992)
- Sallie Chisum Remembers Billy the Kid, Texts by Michael Ondaatje (premiered in Tanglewood in 1994)
- Four Songs, Texts by Toni Morrison (premiered in New York in 1994)
- Vocalise (premiered in Tanglewood in 1995)
- Three Dickinson Songs, Texts by Emily Dickinson (premiered in Quebec, Canada, in 1999)
- The Giraffes Go to Hamburg, Text by Karen Blixen (premiered in Newark in 2000)
- Four Songs, Texts by Philip Larkin and William Carlos Williams (premiered in New York in 2004)
- Sieben Lieder (Seven Songs), Texts by Theodor Storm (US premiere in San Francisco in 2006)

== Film scores (selection) ==
=== Original scores ===
- Border Incident (1949)
- Scene of the Crime (1949)
- The Sun Comes Up (1949)
- Kim (1950)
- The Outriders (1950)
- Tension (1950)
- Cause for Alarm! (1951)
- The Girl Who Had Everything (1953)
- Bad Day at Black Rock (1954)
- It's Always Fair Weather (1955)
- The Catered Affair (1956)
- The Fastest Gun Alive (1956)
- Invitation to the Dance (1956 – original music for scene two, Ring Around the Rosy, by Previn)
- Designing Woman (1957)
- Elmer Gantry (1960)
- The Subterraneans (1960)
- All in a Night's Work (1961)
- The Four Horsemen of the Apocalypse (1961)
- One, Two, Three (1961)
- Long Day's Journey into Night (1962)
- Two for the Seesaw (1962)
- Dead Ringer (1964)
- Goodbye Charlie (1964)
- Kiss Me, Stupid (1964)
- Inside Daisy Clover (1965)
- The Fortune Cookie (1966)

=== Adaptation of original scores or songs by others ===
- The Secret Garden (1949) – adaptation of Bronislau Kaper's music
- Three Little Words (1950) – based on songs by composer Harry Ruby
- Gigi (1958) – adaptation of Frederick Loewe's original music for the film
- Thoroughly Modern Millie (1967) – based on songs by composers Harry Akst, Zez Confrey, Benny Davis, George Gershwin, Georg Friedrich Handel, James F. Hanley, Jimmy Van Heusen, Raymond Hubbell, M.K. Jerome, Sylvia Neufeld, Jay Thompson and Harry Warren, with additional incidental music by Elmer Bernstein

=== Adaptation for film of stage musical or opera by others ===
- Kiss Me, Kate (1953) – after Porter's musical
- Kismet (1953) – after Wright's/Forrest's musical
- Silk Stockings (1957) – after Porter's musical
- Porgy and Bess (1959) – after Gershwin's opera
- Bells Are Ringing (1960) – after Styne's musical
- Irma la Douce (1963) – after Monnot's Musical
- My Fair Lady (1964) – after Loewe's musical
- Paint Your Wagon (1969) – after Loewe's Musical, also additional music for new songs written with Alan Jay Lerner
- Jesus Christ Superstar (1973) – after Lloyd Webber's musical

=== Adaptation for film of classical music by others ===
- The Music Lovers (1970) – arrangement of Peter Tchaikovsky's music
- Rollerball (1975) – arrangement of music by Johann Sebastian Bach, Dmitri Shostakovich, and Peter Tchaikovsky (with some original music by Previn: Executive Party and Executive Party Dance)

== Television Theme Music ==
- Jennie: Lady Randolph Churchill (1974 7-part Thames Television mini-series)

== Notable jazz and pop songs (from soundtracks or jazz records – selection) ==
- Like Young, lyric of vocal version: Paul Francis Webster (1959, for Previn's record Like Young. Secret Songs for Young Lovers – recorded amongst others by Ella Fitzgerald and Perry Como)
- Why Are We Afraid?, lyric of vocal version: Dory Previn (1960, for The Subterraneans – recorded amongst others by André Previn (for the soundtrack) and Art Pepper)
- The Faraway Part of Town and That's How It Went, All Right, lyrics by Dory Previn (1960, for Pepe – The Faraway Part of Town was performed by Judy Garland in the movie, Academy Award Nomination for Best Original Song of 1960; That's How It Went, All Right was performed by Bobby Darin in the movie, with Previn at the piano on screen)
- A Second Chance, lyric by Dory Previn (1962, for Two for the Seesaw, Academy Award Nomination for Best Original Song of 1962)
- You're Gonna Hear from Me, The Circus Is a Wacky World, lyric by Dory Previn (1965, for Inside Daisy Clover – You're Gonna Hear From Me recorded among others by Shirley Bassey, Bill Evans (twice), Ella Fitzgerald, André Previn (twice), Diana Ross and the Supremes, Frank Sinatra, Barbra Streisand, Stanley Turrentine, Scott Walker and Andy Williams)
- Livin' alone, lyric of vocal version: Dory Previn (1966, for Harper – recorded amongst others by André Previn (for the soundtrack))
- (Theme from) Valley of the Dolls, It's Impossible, Come Live with Me, I'll Plant My Own Tree and Give a Little More, lyrics by Dory Previn (1967, for Valley of the Dolls – (Theme from) Valley of the Dolls recorded amongst others by Dionne Warwick and Burt Bacharach, Gladys Knight and the Pips and Smokey Robinson and the Miracles)
- The First Thing You Know, A Million Miles Away Behind the Door, The Gospel of No Name City, Best Things and Gold Fever, lyrics by Alan Jay Lerner (1969, for Paint Your Wagon)
