= Can Spring Be Far Behind? =

Orchestral work by André Previn

Can Spring Be Far Behind? is an orchestral composition written in 2016 by the American composer André Previn. The work was commissioned by the Eastern Music Festival. Its world premiere was given by the Eastern Festival Orchestra conducted by Gerard Schwarz in Greensboro, North Carolina, on July 23, 2016. The piece is dedicated to Janet James, Hillie Mahoney, Lynn McAtee, and Sandra Thompson and was one of Previn's last major works before his death in 2019.

== Composition ==
Can Spring Be Far Behind? is cast in a single movement and lasts about 15 minutes.

=== Instrumentation ===
The work is scored for an orchestra consisting of piccolo, two flutes, two oboes, two clarinets, bass clarinet, two bassoons, three horns, two trumpets, trombone, bass trombone, timpani, one percussionist, harp, and strings.

== Reception ==
Can Spring Be Far Behind? has been praised by music critics. Ken Keaton of the Palm Beach Daily News said that it "opens and closes sprightly, with a language more gestural than melodic, but has a long, lyric center section with plenty of chances for the orchestral soloists to shine." Mark Swed of the Los Angeles Times similarly described the piece as having "the quality of an incomparable raconteur's ramble, a kind of improvisation for orchestra by a once-great improviser." Swed added, "He put in bits of his Hollywood days. He turned small thematic motifs around the way he did fooling around at the piano, and the way he could in conversation. The past sounded like it was flooding in. The orchestral treatment, little solos coming in and out, were the work of a natural. Previn didn't worry about whether he had something to say, he just said."

Jim Farber of the Los Angeles Daily News was somewhat more critical of the piece, however, describing it as "essentially a pastiche of orchestral moods, influences and techniques stitched together like a harmonic patchwork quilt. Well crafted, but without an overall sense of message or magnitude, it combines the diverse musical styles that were all part of Previn's repertory."

== See also ==
- List of compositions by André Previn
