= Basilica of Regina Pacis =

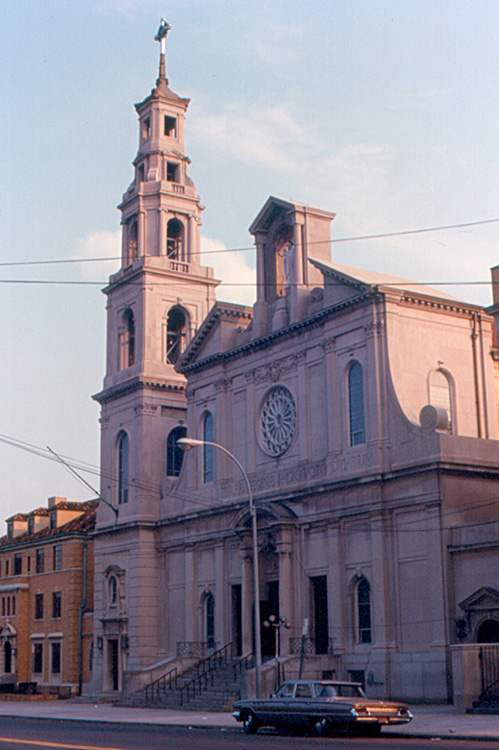

- Location within New York City
- 40°37′36″N 74°0′13″W
- Location: 1230 65th Street; Brooklyn, New York
- Country: United States
- Denomination: Roman Catholic
- Website: basilicaofreginapacis.org

History
- Status: Minor Basilica
- Founder: Rt. Rev. Msgr. Angelo R. Cioffi
- Dedication: Mary, Queen of Peace
- Dedicated: August 15, 1951

Architecture
- Functional status: parish church
- Architect: Anthony J. DePace
- Architectural type: shrine
- Style: Italian Renaissance
- Groundbreaking: October 3, 1948
- Construction cost: $2,000,000

Administration
- Diocese: Brooklyn
- Parish: Parish of St. Rosalia-Regina Pacis

Clergy
- Bishop: His Excellency Most Rev. Robert J. Brennan
- Pastor: Rev. Sebastien Tarcisio Andro

The Basilica of Regina Pacis (Latin for Queen of Peace) is a Catholic parish church located in the Bensonhurst section of Brooklyn, New York, under the Roman Catholic Diocese of Brooklyn. The church was built as a votive shrine, within the then-Parish of St. Rosalia (later renamed St. Rosalia-Regina Pacis Parish). The original parish church, built in 1905, was considered the "Mother Church of Italian immigrants" of the diocese.

The church was raised to the status of a minor basilica by Pope Benedict XVI in November 2012.

In June 2017, the diocese closed the Church of St. Rosalia, establishing the basilica as the parish church.

== History ==
At a Sunday Mass in May 1942--during the course of World War II, the pastor, Angelo R. Cioffi, urged his congregation to build a shrine dedicated to Mary, under her title of Queen of Peace, for the safe return of the men of the parish and country from the battlefields of the war and for a just and lasting peace. The parishioners accepted the challenge and vowed to erect the church. A building fund was then established which included plans for the projected shrine, as well the construction of a new convent, and the enlargement of the parish school.

Ground was broken for the construction of the church on October 3, 1948, with the cornerstone being blessed on October 29 of the following year by Raymond Kearney, auxiliary bishop of the diocese. Originally one of the few air-conditioned churches in America, the church was completed in 1950, built in the style of the Italianate Renaissance Revival architecture, and an image of Mary was enthroned over the main altar. It was built entirely in marble from various parts of Italy, with two pulpits, after the manner of Italian cathedrals. The 52 foot high ceiling mural shows the Coronation of Our Lady Regina Pacis in Heaven. It is a huge creation, 60 by 27 feet, painted by the distinguished Italian artist Ignacio LaRussa over the course of three years in Rome and New York. In the lower part we see the image of Pope Pius XII, the reigning Pope at the time the Church was built, symbolically blessing the Shrine of Peace in the presence of Prelates and a large congregation that looks up ecstatically at the Coronation of the Blessed Mother. Further up, resting on the clouds and in a semi-circular formation, we see the various saints who particularly distinguished themselves for their devotion to Mary. Above these saints, a choir of Angels with St. Michael the Archangel. Then, still further up, the glorious image of Our Lady Regina Pacis in the act of being crowned Queen of Heaven and Earth by the Eternal Father and Her Divine Son while the Holy Spirit is streaming down beams of light and graces upon her. LaRussa also completed two flanking oval paintings portraying the Assumption of Mary into Heaven and the Resurrection of Jesus. A large painting of the church's patron saint done by the noted artist Ilario Panzironi was installed over the main altar. The shrine was dedicated on August 15, 1951, by the Bishop of Brooklyn, Archbishop Thomas E. Molloy.

After the blessing of the cornerstone of the church in 1949, Cioffi had asked the people to donate their own personal jewelry in order to give thanks for the successful conclusion of the war by the creation of two gold crowns to honor further the planned image of the church's patroness and her son. The parishioners and other faithful began to donate wedding rings and other types of jewelry to the project. The collected valuables were entrusted to the firm of DeNatale Brothers in Manhattan so that the crowns and stars could be made, a process which took three years. The image was honored on May 24, 1952, by the addition of two diamond-studded crowns attached to it, which had been personally blessed by Pope Pius XII in Rome when they were presented to him in a special audience by Cioffi and the jeweler, Mr. DeNatale.

=== The Miracle ===
Just eight days after the coronation of the image, the crowns were found to have been stolen. People flocked to the church to pray for their safe return. The number of visitors was estimated at the time to have reached some 12,000 people. The crowns were returned a week later through the postal system. The people of the parish have always held this to have been a miracle. The jewels were allegedly returned at the behest of local organized crime figure Joseph Profaci.

The crowns were stolen again on January 10, 1973. They were recovered 12 days later from a locker in the East Side Airlines Terminal after the Federal Bureau of Investigation received a tip from a phone call.

== Current status ==
Over the decades the population of the neighborhood surrounding the church has undergone a marked change, with new immigrant groups, primarily from Latin America and Asia, replacing the original Italian residents. Today Mass is offered at the church not only in English but in Spanish and Chinese.

=== Basilica ===
In 2011 the Bishop of Brooklyn, Nicholas DiMarzio, made a request of the Congregation for Divine Worship in the Vatican that the church be honored by designation as a basilica. In November 2012, while the New York City region was recovering from the effects of Hurricane Sandy, the bishop received notice that the Holy See had approved this request.

A Mass to mark this honor was celebrated at the church on December 8, 2012, presided over by the bishop.
