= Owls (composition) =

Owls is a symphonic poem by the German-American composer André Previn. The work was commissioned by the Boston Symphony Orchestra under James Levine. The world premiere was given by the Boston Symphony Orchestra under Previn on October 2, 2008.

== Composition ==
Owls is composed in a single movement and has a duration of roughly 15 minutes. Previn was inspired to write the piece after seeing a pair of young owls near his home in England. The owls had fallen from a tree behind his house, were nursed back to health, and were eventually returned to the wild.

=== Instrumentation ===
The work is scored for an orchestra comprising two flutes (2nd doubling piccolo), two oboes (2nd doubling English horn), two clarinets, bass clarinet, two bassoons, four horns, two trumpets, timpani, percussion, celesta, harp, and strings.

== Reception ==
Reviewing the world premiere, of The Boston Globe called it an "easily accessible, openly lyrical" piece and wrote, "In his score, Previn runs with the idea of animals spotted in groups of two, dispensing woodwind instruments in pairs. The strings often speak in one massed voice, swelled up in lush sonorities..." Timothy Mangan of the Orange County Register described it as "a real charmer, a pastoral and nocturnal tone poem with the instruments featured in harmonized pairs, like the forest creatures they evoke." He added, "The piece is medium tempoed, barely bothers with climax, and ambles amiably. Its pleasures are quiet."

== See also ==
- List of compositions by André Previn
