= Billy Gray (comedian) =

American comedian, comedy club owner and actor

Billy Gray (born William Victor Giventer, March 17, 1904, New York City, New York – January 4, 1978, Los Angeles, California) was an American comedian, comedy club owner and an actor.

== Career ==
Gray was studying law when he won a dance contest, and decided to enter show business instead. He and his diminutive partner Jerry Bergen appeared in the MGM two-reel short subject The Little Maestro in 1937. They split up in 1940.

Gray appeared on The Abbott and Costello Show from 1942 until 1943. He played a girl named Matilda, whose catchphrase was "I'm only three-and-a-half years old." He also appeared on stage with Abbott and Costello in their appearances at military bases during World War II.

== Billy Gray's Band Box ==
Gray is perhaps best known for his long-term operation of a comedy club in West Hollywood, Billy Gray's Band Box. In 1942 Lou Costello had purchased the property at 123 North Fairfax Avenue from Pete and Billy Snyder. Costello ran The Band Box as a conventional nightclub, with a house orchestra for dancing, and musical and comedy performers entertaining the guests. The club's master of ceremonies was celebrity impersonator Jackie Greene; Costello installed Billy Gray as Greene's replacement. Among the performers were Maxie Rosenbloom, Buddy Hackett, Polly Bergen, Alan King, Billy Barty, Don Rickles, and Jackie Gleason. Gray later took over the club himself, renaming it Billy Gray's Band Box and emphasizing comedy.

Comedy songwriter Sid Kuller and composer Hal Borne composed a topical novelty song, "Everybody Wants a Little Peace", which Gray recorded as a party record for De Luxe Records in 1948. In 1956 Billy Gray presented Sid Kuller's parody of the Lerner and Loewe musical, My Fair Lady, entitled My Fairfax Lady. The show, featuring Kuller's new lyrics to the original Lerner and Loewe show tunes, ran for five years at the Band Box until Gray recorded a soundtrack album. What had been a strictly local attraction now became a national offering, compelling Lerner and Loewe to sue for infringement. Gray was forced to withdraw the album.

Gray appeared in two feature films: he played the Yiddish-speaking agent of Jack Lemmon and Tony Curtis in Billy Wilder's famous comedy Some Like It Hot (1959) and appeared in Two for the Seesaw (1962) with Robert Mitchum, as Mr. Jacoby.

He also appeared in a 1966 episode of the TV series That Girl.

== Death ==
The Band Box closed in 1973 and Gray, who drank heavily, died in poverty in 1978. His club is commemorated in the name of a sandwich at Canter's, a nearby Fairfax Avenue deli.

== Filmography ==
Year	Title	Role	Notes
1946	Specter of the Rose	Jack Jones	
1956	The Scarlet Hour	Tom Rycker	
1959	Some Like It Hot	Sig Poliakoff	
1962	Two for the Seesaw	Mr. Jacoby	
