= Bill Lovett =

Irish American gangster

- Born: July 15, 1894
- Died: November 1, 1923 (aged 29); New York City, New York, USA
- Other name: Wild Bill
- Spouse: Anna Lonergan (m. 1923; died 1923)
- Allegiance: White Hand Gang (after 1920); Jay Street Gang
- Military career
- Allegiance: United States
- Branch: Army
- Unit: 77th Infantry Division
- Conflicts: World War I
- Awards: Distinguished Service Cross

William J. "Wild Bill" Lovett (July 15, 1894 – November 1, 1923) was an Irish American gangster in early 20th century New York.

== Beginnings ==
Lovett was brought to New York City as a child and first fell in with the local Irish gangs around the Brooklyn waterfront as a teenager. The day after America's entry into World War I, Lovett enlisted in the United States Army. He was assigned to Company C, 13th Machine Gun Battalion, 77th Infantry Division. During fierce combat on the Western Front, Lovett was awarded the Distinguished Service Cross for bravery. Upon his return to Brooklyn, he resumed his place as head of the Jay Street Gang, a group of toughs who sparred with Dinny Meehan's rival White Hand Gang for control of Brooklyn's lucrative waterfront rackets.

== Rise to prominence ==
Lovett was labeled by the media as the new "leader" of the White Hand Gang after he took control of the waterfront rackets upon the killing of Dinny Meehan, who was shot while sleeping at his home with his wife at his side on the afternoon of March 31, 1920 (the press lumped both Lovett's and Meehan's gang together). While Italian gangster Frankie Yale is long thought to have arranged the murder, Meehan's killers casually entered his apartment in broad daylight, even stopping to chat with his young son, something rival Italian mobsters were unlikely to have done. Police at the time, in fact, believed that Meehan was probably killed by his arch-rival, Bill Lovett.

Despite being well-educated and articulate, Wild Bill was a temperamental alcoholic who made even his own men nervous (he shot one of them for pulling a cat's tail; Lovett loved animals and couldn't stand to see them suffer). Rather than move his gang into the new business of bootlegging, Lovett's main income came from dockside extortion, burglary, and other crimes. Although Lovett is long thought by urban legend to have fought a desperate gang war with Italian mobster Frankie Yale, the greatest threat to Lovett's power was from rival Irish gangsters who wanted a bigger piece of the waterfront action. Lovett was suspected by police of killing Samuel DeAngelo in September 1919 and Dan Gillen in September 1920; in both cases, he beat the rap.

While walking after a court appearance in late 1921, a gunman darted from an alley and tried unsuccessfully to shoot Lovett. The alleged attacker, Meehan gangster Garry Barry, was found stabbed to death on a Brooklyn street corner not long after. Lovett came close to death on 3 January 1923, when he was shot three times in the chest and dangerously wounded. When police questioned him as to who shot him, Wild Bill replied, "I got mine. Don't ask any questions." Later he added, "Don't try to pump me. It's give and take. When we get it, we take it and say nothing." Soon after his recovery, Lovett's alleged attacker, Eddie Hughes, was found shot to death. Lovett was suspected in the murder but never charged.

Lovett was next suspected of luring the Quilty brothers, James and Timmy, to Thomas Sand's saloon on 3 May 1923. During the subsequent attack, Timmy Quilty was killed and James severely injured. A few weeks later, on May 21, Lovett mobster Frank Healy was murdered at Jay and Plymouth streets in retaliation. Just five days later, Healy's alleged shooter, Frank Byrne, was walking near Nassau and Gold streets with James Martin when they were ambushed. Byrne managed to escape but Martin was killed. Lovett and several of his men were arrested, but no one was charged.

== Retirement and death ==
After the failed attempt on his life and the subsequent gang violence attached to it, Lovett began courting Anna Lonergan, sister of his top lieutenant Richard "Pegleg" Lonergan. After their marriage on June 26, 1923, Lovett vowed to his wife that he would not only quit drinking but quit the criminal rackets as well. Wild Bill turned over command of the gang to new brother-in-law Pegleg Lonergan and bought a new house in Little Ferry, New Jersey. For three months, Lovett managed to stay clear of trouble.

On October 30, 1923, Lovett went into New York City for the purpose of attending a job interview for the position of foreman of a silk factory. Evidently not trusting himself, he asked his wife Anna to accompany him, which she declined to do. Instead of going to the interview, Lovett found his way back to his old haunts along the Brooklyn waterfront and began carousing with old pals. The next morning, Anna Lovett managed to track her husband to Thomas Sand's saloon (the same place where Timmy Quilty had been killed months before). Lovett got on the phone and asked his wife to come pick him up. Angry that her husband had broken his promises, Anna refused. Lovett stayed in the neighborhood and continued drinking, spending most of Halloween with an old friend named Joseph Flynn. Later that night, both Flynn and Lovett staggered into the rear of an abandoned store at 25 Bridge Street to sleep off their drunks. Flynn later told police he awoke in the middle of night and went home while Lovett was still asleep. Police later determined that sometime between 2 and 3 that morning, two men entered the rear of the store to attack Lovett. As one beat him about the head with a blunt instrument, the other shot Lovett three times in the head and neck. Lovett's dead body was found several hours later. He was buried in Cypress Hills Cemetery with full military honors."

While it has long been said that Bill Lovett was surprised in a speakeasy and killed by gangsters working for Frankie Yale (specifically Willie "Two-Knife" Altieri), the police investigation indicated that Lovett was most probably killed by fellow Irish gangsters for one reason or another, just as his old adversary Dinny Meehan had been.
