= Shinnick =

Shinnick is an English-language surname of Irish origin. Notable people with the surname include:

- Don Shinnick (1935-2004), American football player
- Pete Shinnick (born 1965), American football coach and former player
- Phil Shinnick (born 1943), American track and field athlete
- Thomas Shinnick (1833-?), Irish American politician
- Tim Shinnick (1867–1944), American baseball player

== See also ==
- Tinney, a similar Gaelic origin, Anglicized differently
