= Frankie Yale =

Italian American mob boss (1893–1928)

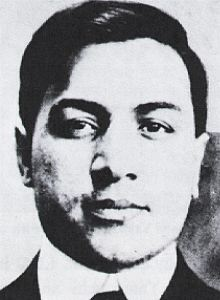
- Yale's 1912 mugshot
- Born: Francesco Ioele; January 22, 1893; Longobucco, Calabria, Italy
- Died: July 1, 1928 (aged 35); New York, New York, U.S.
- Cause of death: Gunshot wounds
- Resting place: Holy Cross Cemetery, Brooklyn, U.S.
- Other name: Frankie Uale
- Occupation: Mobster
- Spouses: Maria Delapia (m. 1918; div. 1927) Lucita Ioele (m. 1927)
- Children: 3
- Allegiance: Masseria crime family

Francesco Ioele (Italian: [franˈtʃesko joˈɛːle]; January 22, 1893 – July 1, 1928), known as Frankie Yale or Frankie Uale, was an American gangster based in Brooklyn and the second employer of Al Capone.

== Early life ==
Yale was born in Longobucco, Italy, on January 22, 1893, to Domenico and Isabella (née DeSimone) Ioele. He had an older brother, John, and two younger siblings, Assunta and Angelo. He and his family arrived in the United States c. 1900. As a teenager, Ioele was befriended by John Torrio, who ushered him into the Five Points Gang and groomed him for a life of crime. Shortly after Torrio left for Chicago, in 1909, Ioele "Americanized" his last name to Yale. Despite his medium height and chubby build, Yale was a fearsome fistfighter and thief. In 1910, at age 17, Yale and a friend, a wrestler named Bobby Nelson, severely beat several men during a fight in the Coney Island pool hall, which involved cracking pool cues and hurling billiard balls. One of his early arrests, in October 1912, was on suspicion of homicide.

== Brooklyn crime boss ==
Like his mentor Johnny Torrio, Yale was one of a new breed of gangster who believed in putting business ahead of ego. After getting started with some basic racketeering, Yale took control of Brooklyn's ice delivery trade by selling "protection" and creating monopolies. In 1917, with the proceeds from these rackets, Yale opened the Harvard Inn bar on Seaside Walk in Coney Island. Hoping to capitalize on the collegiate name of his bar, he began using the name Yale. It was at the Harvard Inn that a young bouncer named Al Capone got his famous facial scars in a dispute with Frank Galluccio, after Capone flirted with Galluccio's sister. After two years in Yale's employ, Capone was shipped off west to Chicago by Yale, and joined Torrio's organization.

Yale's gang engaged in Black Hand extortion activities and ran a string of brothels. Their gang became the first new-style Mafia "family" which included Italians from all regions and could work in partnership with other ethnic groups if it was good for business. Yale's "services" to his customers included offering "protection" to local merchants and controlling food services for restaurants, as well as ice deliveries for Brooklyn residents. Yale's notorious sideline was his line of cigars, foul-smelling stogies packaged in boxes that bore his smiling face. Yale also owned and operated Uliano & Yale funeral home at 6604 14th Avenue (he and his family lived across the street). When asked about his profession, Yale wryly commented that he was an "undertaker". At the beginning of Prohibition, Yale became one of Brooklyn's biggest bootleggers.

In addition to Capone, other gangsters who worked under Yale at one time or another included Joe Adonis, Anthony "Little Augie" Carfano, and Albert Anastasia. Yale's top assassin was Willie "Two-Knife" Altieri, nicknamed as such due to his preferred method of dispatching a victim.

== Personal life ==
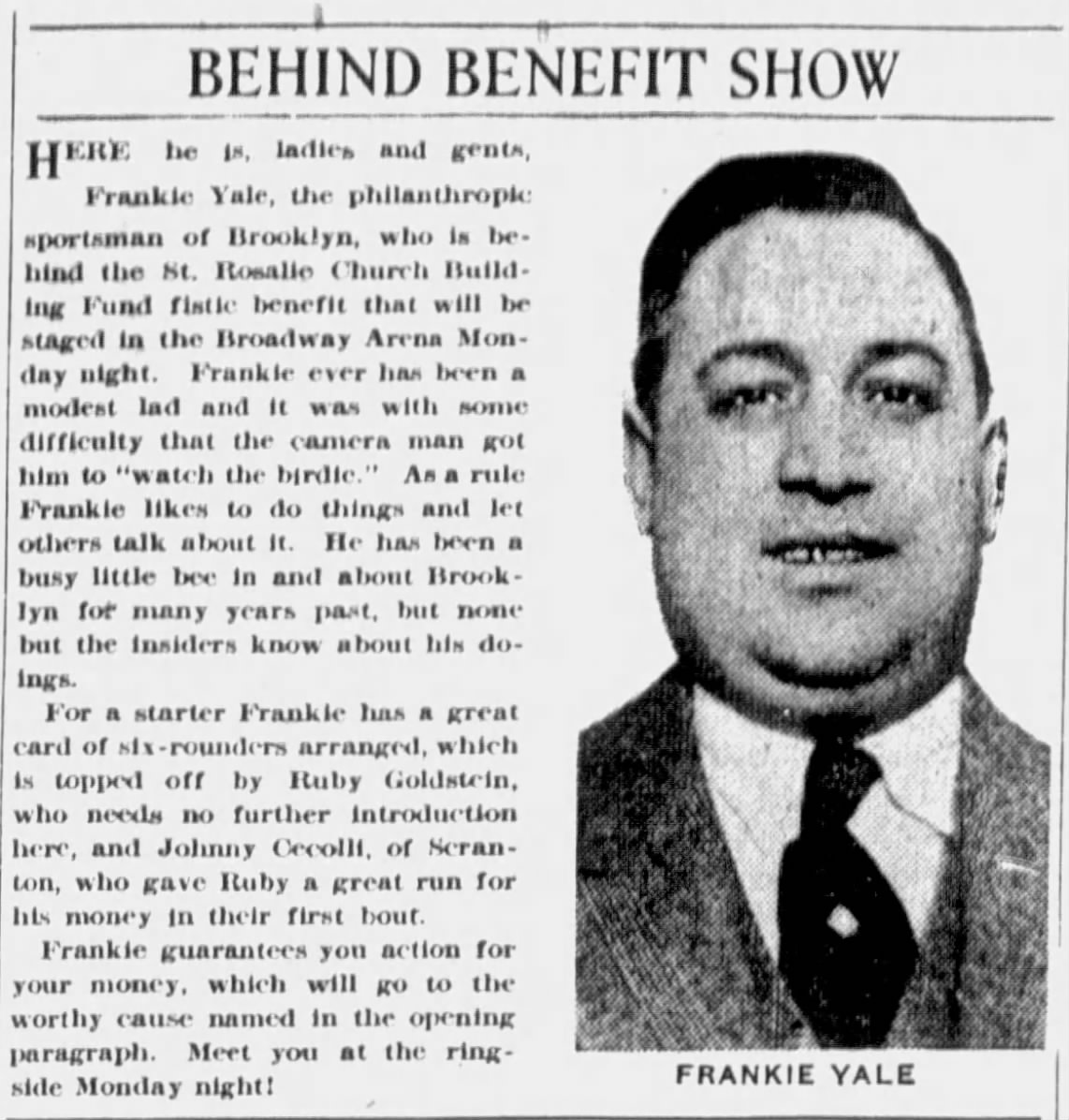
Yale cultivated a populist public image as a philanthropic sporting event promoter. In a 1927 Brooklyn Daily Times profile, he promoted a charitable boxing card to benefit the building fund of St. Rosalia's Church.

Soon after the Harvard Inn opened, Yale married Maria Delapia, with whom he had two daughters, Rosa and Isabella. They later separated, he married a younger woman called Lucita in 1927 and they had a daughter, Angelina. Yale was also noted as a stylish dresser, favoring expensive suits and diamond jewelry. One newspaper reporter called him the "Beau Brummell of Brooklyn". Yale was also known for generosity toward the less fortunate people in his neighborhood, who often approached him and requested financial assistance. After a local delicatessen owner was robbed, Yale replaced his lost cash. When a fish peddler lost his cart, Yale gave him $200 with an admonition: "Get a horse, you're too old to walk". Yale was dubbed the "Prince of Pals".

Conversely, Yale was a violent man who did not hesitate to inflict pain on others. When angered by his younger brother Angelo, Yale beat him so badly that he wound up in the hospital. When two extortionists attempted to shake down the popular hat-check operator of a neighborhood restaurant, Yale battered the two unconscious. In May 1920, Yale traveled to Chicago and personally killed longtime gang boss Big Jim Colosimo at the behest of Chicago Outfit friends Torrio and Capone. Colosimo was allegedly murdered because he stood in the way of his gang making huge bootlegging profits in Chicago. Although suspected by Chicago police, Yale was never officially charged.

== Rivals ==
Tradition has long claimed that Yale fought a desperate gang war for control of the Brooklyn docks with the Irish White Hand Gang. Recent research has called much of that into question and indicated that Yale's worst enemies were not the Irish waterfront racketeers but rival Italian crime families who were constantly jockeying for power in Brooklyn during the 1920s.

The first known attempt on Yale's life occurred on February 6, 1921, when he and two of his men were ambushed in Lower Manhattan after they stepped from their car in order to attend a banquet. One of Yale's bodyguards was killed and the other wounded, with Yale himself sustaining a severe lung wound. Yale pulled through after an extended recovery.

Five months after Yale's injury, on July 15, 1921, he, his brother Angelo, and four men were driving on Cropsey Avenue in Bath Beach when another car filled with rival gunmen overtook them and opened fire. Angelo and one of Yale's men were wounded. This attack was believed to have been carried out in revenge for the June 5 killing of a Manhattan mobster named Ernesto Melchiorre, who had been murdered after a late-night visit to the Harvard Inn. Melchiorre's brother Silvio was believed to have been the driving force behind the unsuccessful attack. Eight days later, Yale's men gunned down Silvio Melchiorre in front of his Little Italy cafe.

Yet another attempt on Yale's life took place on July 9, 1923. Yale's chauffeur, Frank Forte, had taken the Yale family to a christening at a nearby church. While Yale decided to walk back to his 14th Avenue home, Forte drove Maria Yale and her two daughters back. As the women exited the vehicle a carload of four gangsters rolled past, mistook Frank Forte for his boss, and shot him.

== O'Banion murder ==
In November 1924, Yale was asked once again to come to Chicago to assist Capone and Torrio, who needed another rival murdered. On November 10, 1924, Yale, John Scalise, and Albert Anselmi reportedly entered the Schofield Flower Shop and killed North Side Gang leader Dean O'Banion. Eight days later, the Chicago Police arrested Yale and Sam Pollaccia at Chicago's Union Station as they were about to depart for New York. Yale said he had come to town for the funeral of Unione Siciliana president Mike Merlo and stayed to see old friends. Yale further claimed to be having lunch at the time of O'Banion's murder. Police could not shake his alibi and were compelled to release him.

== The Adonis Club incident ==
In the early morning hours of December 26, 1925, White Hand gang boss Richard "Pegleg" Lonergan and a few of his men were attacked at Brooklyn's Adonis Club by a handful of Yale's men and a visiting Al Capone (Capone's son Sonny had just had an operation for a mastoid infection in New York). Lonergan planned on leading his men into the club to attack the Yale crew as they gathered for their annual Christmas party. Instead, Yale had Al Capone and his men set up an ambush and open fire on Lonergan, Aaron Harms, James "Ragtime" Howard, Paddy Maloney, Cornelius "Needles" Ferry, and James Hart. Lonergan, Ferry, and Harms were all killed while Hart was severely wounded.

An examination of the original police reports and witness accounts does not support this version. According to author Patrick Downey, the Adonis Club shootings were most probably a spur-of-the-moment reaction to a drunken argument that Needles Ferry had engaged in with Capone and his companions.

== Downfall ==
By the mid-1920s, Yale was noted as one of the most powerful gangsters in Brooklyn. In addition to his numerous rackets, Yale made inroads into labor racketeering and dockside extortion as well. In the spring of 1927, however, Yale's long friendship with Capone began to fray. As a major importer of Canadian whisky, Yale supplied much of Capone's whiskey. Yale would oversee the landing of the booze and make sure the Chicago-bound trucks made it safely through New York. Soon, many of the trucks began being hijacked before they left Brooklyn. Suspecting a double cross, Capone asked an old pal, James "Filesy" DeAmato, to keep an eye on his trucks. DeAmato reported that Yale was indeed hijacking his booze. Soon after this, Capone's spy realized that his cover had been blown and tried unsuccessfully to shoot Yale on the night of July 1, 1927. Six nights later, DeAmato was gunned down on a Brooklyn street corner.

In a last-ditch effort to mend the relationship with his longtime friend, Capone invited Yale to Chicago to view the Dempsey-Tunney heavyweight title rematch at Soldier Field on September 22, 1927. While their visit was civil enough, the pair's friendship began to rapidly deteriorate after Yale returned to New York. Distracted by a gang war with rival mobster Joe Aiello, a brief exile from Chicago, and the 1928 Republican primary election, Capone had to wait until the spring of 1928 to plan retaliation.

On July 1, 1928, a Sunday afternoon, Yale was in his Sunrise Club, located at 14th Avenue and 65th Street, when he received a cryptic phone call. The caller said something was wrong with Yale's new wife Lucy, who was at home looking after their year-old daughter. Refusing Joseph Piraino's offer to drive him, Yale dashed out to his brand new, coffee-colored Lincoln coupe and took off up New Utrecht Avenue, where a Buick sedan carrying four armed individuals stopped next to him. While Yale's new Lincoln was fashioned with armor plating, the dealer had neglected to bullet-proof the windows. Recognizing his peril, when the light changed, Yale took off. After a chase up New Utrecht, Yale swerved west onto 44th Street, with the Buick close behind. Yale's car was soon overtaken by the Buick, whose occupants opened fire at close range. A shotgun blast struck the Brooklyn gang boss on the left side of the head while a submachine gun bullet sliced through his brain. Either wound would have killed Yale instantly. The now out-of-control Lincoln veered to the right, hopped the curb, and crashed into the stoop of a brownstone at No. 923. This was the first time a submachine gun had been used in a gangland killing in New York City. On August 2, 1928, it was reported that two men were being sought for the murder of Yale, but his murderers have never been identified.

== Aftermath ==
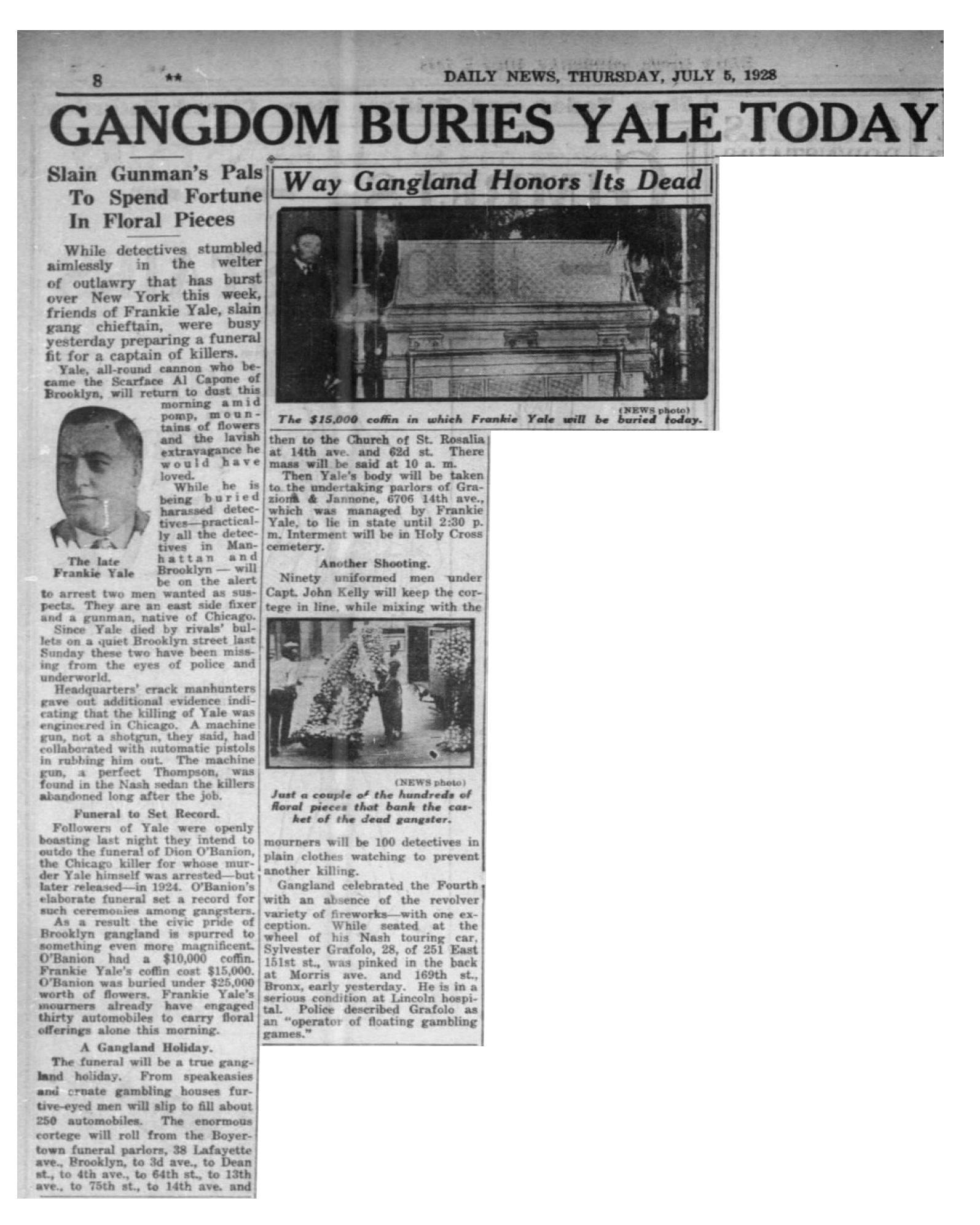
The July 5, 1928 New York Daily News describes preparations for Frankie Yale's opulent funeral following his murder.

The abandoned Buick was later discovered a few blocks away from the murder site. Inside the car police found a .38 caliber revolver, a .45 automatic, a sawed-off pump shotgun and a Thompson submachine gun. The handguns were eventually traced to Miami, the car itself was traced to Knoxville, Tennessee, and the submachine gun to a Chicago sporting goods dealer named Peter von Frantzius. Police noted that at the time of murder, Yale was wearing a four-carat diamond ring, as well as a belt buckle engraved with his initials. The letters on the buckle held a total of 75 diamond chips. Capone was said to give such belt buckles to those he admired very much.

Police repeatedly questioned Capone about the Yale murder, but nothing came of the inquiries. Yale's murder represented the first time that the Thompson submachine gun was used in New York gangland warfare. Yale's killers were theorized to be Capone mob gunmen Tony "Joe Batters" Accardo, Fred "Killer" Burke, Gus Winkler, George "Shotgun" Ziegler, and Louis "Little New York" Campagna. Most of these hitmen are believed to have participated in the St. Valentine's Day Massacre seven months later. One of the submachine guns used in the Massacre was later ballistically linked to Yale's murder.

Yale received one of the most impressive gangland funerals in American history, at which thousands of Brooklynites lined the streets to watch the procession. He was buried wearing evening clothes, holding grey suede gloves and a gold rosary. Thirty-eight cars were required to bear all the floral arrangements while 250 Cadillac limousines carried the mourners. Yale's $15,000 silver casket rested on an open hearse with a podium. At Holy Cross Cemetery, there was additional drama when two different women claimed to be Yale's wife. As the casket was lowered, 112 mourners simultaneously tossed roses into the grave. Yale's funeral set a standard of opulence for American gangsters that has been seldom matched over the years.

== Legacy ==
While Yale is somewhat overlooked in crime histories, he was one of New York's leading gangsters in the 1920s. In the initial aftermath of Yale's murder, leadership of his family was taken over by Anthony Carfano. Four months later Joe Masseria orchestrated the murder of mobster Salvatore D'Aquila. The December 1928 Hotel Statler meeting in Cleveland was most probably called to head off a potential New York gang war. Roughly half of Yale's men and territory were absorbed by the D'Aquila crime family, which was now led by Al Mineo, while the rest remained under Carfano. Yale's murder turned out to be the first in a series of events that facilitated Masseria's attempt to consolidate all of New York's Mafia families under his control, which eventually resulted in the Castellammarese War.

== In popular culture ==
- Yale is mentioned in Arthur Miller's play A View from the Bridge.
- Yale's story was given the comic book treatment in All True Detective Cases No. 2, Avon Comics April/May 1954.
- Yale is portrayed by John Cassavetes in the 1975 film Capone.
- Yale is played by Robert Ellenstein in the TV series The Lawless Years and by Al Ruscio in the original The Untouchables television series. A much more simplified depiction of his murder was featured in the opening scene of an episode of the remake series.
- He is portrayed by Joseph Riccobene in the HBO Series Boardwalk Empire.
