= Richard Lonergan =

Leader of the White Hand Gang (1900–1925)

- Born: January 16, 1900; Brooklyn, New York City, New York, U.S.
- Died: December 26, 1925 (aged 25); South Brooklyn, New York City, New York, U.S.
- Cause of death: Murdered
- Other names: Peg Leg Lonergan; Pegleg Lonergan
- Occupation: Mobster
- Known for: Leader of the White Hand Gang
- Parent: John Lonergan
- Relatives: Anna Lonergan (sister); Bill Lovett (brother-in-law); Matty Martin (brother-in-law)

Richard Joseph "Peg Leg" Lonergan (January 16, 1900 - December 26, 1925) was an American underworld figure and labor racketeer. He was a high-ranking member and the final leader of the White Hand Gang. He succeeded Bill Lovett after his murder in 1923 and, under his leadership, led a two-year campaign against Frankie Yale over the New York waterfront until he and five of his lieutenants were killed in South Brooklyn during a Christmas Day celebration at the Adonis Social Club in 1925.

== Biography ==
Richard Lonergan was one of fifteen children, among them being Anna Lonergan known as "Queen of the Irishtown docks", born to local prize fighter and bare-knuckle boxer John Lonergan. Raised in Irishtown, an Irish-American enclave between the Manhattan and Brooklyn waterfront, he later lost his right leg in a trolley car accident as a child from which his underworld nickname "Peg Leg" originated. A childhood friend and later brother-in-law of Bill Lovett, Lonergan had earned a fearsome reputation in Irishtown and on the Brooklyn waterfront as a vicious street brawler after killing a Sicilian drug dealer in a Navy Street bike shop. Believed by authorities to have been involved in at least a dozen murders during his criminal career, he was reportedly well known for his hatred of Italian-Americans and would occasionally lead "guinea hunting" expeditions in saloons and dive bars along the waterfront. He became the leader of the White Hand Gang shortly after the murder of its leader Bill Lovett in 1923. Lonergan spent the next two years battling Frankie Yale over control of the New York waterfront.

On the night of December 25, 1925, Lonergan and five of his men entered the Adonis Social Club during a Christmas celebration. Lonergan and the other White handers, according to witnesses, were intoxicated and being unruly to other patrons. Lonergan himself loudly and openly called nearby customers "wops", "dagos" and other ethnic slurs. When three local Irish girls entered the club escorted by their Italian dates, Lonergan chased them out supposedly yelling at them to "Come back with white men, fer chrissake!" It was at that moment that the lights went out and gunfire was heard. Customers rushed for the exits in a panic as glass was shattered as well as tables and chairs being overturned. As police arrived, they found one of Lonergan's men, his best friend Aaron Harms, dead in the street and they followed a blood trail into the club where they found Lonergan and drug addict Cornelius "Needles" Ferry on the dance floor near a player piano shot execution style. A fourth member, James Hart, managed to escape, having been found a few blocks away crawling on the sidewalk after being shot in the thigh and leg. He was taken to the Cumberland Street Hospital where he eventually recovered but refused to cooperate with police. He denied being at the club claiming he had been shot by a stray bullet from a passing car. The two other members, Joseph "Ragtime Joe" Howard and Patrick "Happy" Maloney, were apparently unaccounted for leaving no witnesses willing to testify. Although seven men had been arrested in connection to the shooting, including a visiting Al Capone, all the men were released on bail ranging from $5,000 to $10,000 and the case was eventually dismissed.

Anna Lonergan publicly blamed the gangland shooting on "foreigners" commenting "You can bet it was no Irish American like ourselves who would stage a mean murder like this on Christmas Day". The killings are generally attributed to Capone, in partnership with Frankie Yale, although these often colorful accounts are sometimes vague and inconsistent but allege that the incident was prearranged. It is with the death of Lonergan however that the White Hand Gang disappeared from the Brooklyn waterfront allowing Frankie Yale and eventually the Five Families to take control.
