= Concerto for Orchestra (Previn) =

2016 composition by André Previn

André Previn's Concerto for Orchestra was written in 2016 on a commission by then Executive Director Peter H. Gistelinck on behalf of the Kalamazoo Symphony Orchestra underwritten by the Robert and Marianne Denes Fund in celebration of the ensemble's centennial 2020–2021 concert season. Its world premiere was given by the Kalamazoo Symphony Orchestra conducted by Julian Kuerti in Kalamazoo, Michigan, on June 4, 2022. The piece was Previn's last composed concerto before his death in 2019 at the age of 89.

== Structure ==
The concerto has a duration of approximately 25 minutes as is cast in four movements:

1. Prologue
2. Duets
3. Remember
4. Finale

== Instrumentation ==
The work is scored for a large orchestra comprising three flutes (3rd doubling piccolo), two oboes (2nd doubling English horn), English horn, two clarinets (1st doubling A♭ clarinet; 2nd doubling E♭ clarinet), bass clarinet, two bassoons, contrabassoon, four horns, three trumpets, two trombones, bass trombone, tuba, timpani, three percussionists, celesta, harp, and strings.

== See also ==
- List of compositions by André Previn
