= Tinney =

Tinney is an English-language surname of Irish origin, anglicised from Mac an tSionnaigh, "son of fox", or a toponymic surname derived from any places named "Tinney" or similar. Notable people with the surname include:

- Al Tinney (1921–2002), American jazz pianist
- Chris Tinney, Australian astronomer
- Claus Tinney, German actor, screenwriter and film director
- Daisy Tinney (1893 – 1962), New Zealand photographer
- Frank Tinney (1886–1940), vaudeville entertainer
- Hugh Tinney (born 1958), Irish pianist
- Hugh Tinney (footballer), Scottish footballer
- James Tinney (c. 1941 – 1988), American historian and minister
- Jessica Tinney, Miss Alabama
- Joel Tinney, Canadian Lacrosse Player
- John Tinney (d. 1761), English engraver and printseller
- John Tinney McCutcheon
- Joseph E. Tinney (April 24, 1910 – May 13, 2006), American attorney and politician
- Mary Catherine Tinney, Irish diplomat
- Matt Tinney (21st century), reporter and weekend newsreader
- Mike Tinney, American game designer
- Niall Tinney, Fermanagh Gaelic footballer
- Phillip Tinney, Scottish footballer
- Robert Tinney (1947–2026), American contemporary illustrator
- Sheila Tinney, Irish mathematical physicist
- Stuart Tinney (born 1964), Olympic-level equestrian rider
- Hugh Tinney (footballer), Scottish footballer
- The Tinney Family, owners of Belcourt Castle in Newport, Rhode Island, United States

== See also ==
- Shinnick, a similar Gaelic origin, Anglicized differently
