= William Gibson (playwright) =

American playwright and novelist

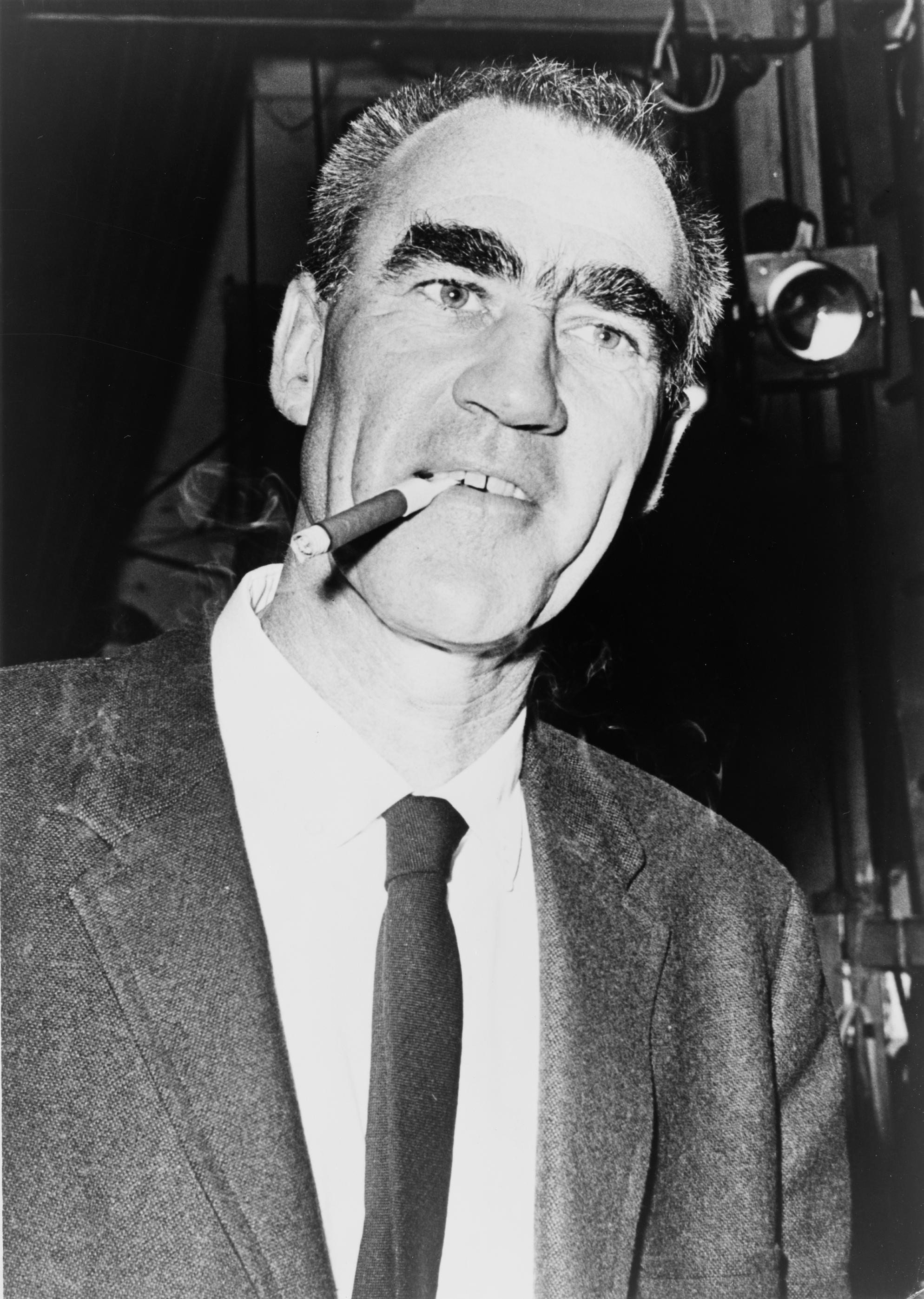
Gibson in 1964

William Gibson (November 13, 1914 – November 25, 2008) was an American playwright and novelist. He won the Tony Award for Best Play for The Miracle Worker in 1960, which he later adapted for a film version in 1962.

== Early life and education ==
Gibson graduated from the City College of New York in 1938. He was of Irish, French, German, Dutch, Russian, and Greek ancestry.

== Work as playwright ==
Gibson made his Broadway debut with Two for the Seesaw in 1958, a critically acclaimed two-character play, which starred Henry Fonda and, in her own Broadway debut, Anne Bancroft. It was directed by Arthur Penn. Gibson published a chronicle of the vicissitudes of rewriting for the sake of this production with The Seesaw Log, a nonfiction book. His most famous play is The Miracle Worker (1959), the story of Helen Keller's childhood education, which won him the Tony Award for Best Play after he adapted it from his original 1957 telefilm script. He adapted the work again for the 1962 film version, receiving an Academy Award nomination for Best Adapted Screenplay. Arthur Penn directed both the stage and film versions.

His other works include Dinny and the Witches (1948, revised 1961), in which a jazz musician incurs the wrath of three Shakespearean witches by blowing a riff which stops time; the book for the musical version of Clifford Odets' Golden Boy (1964), which earned him yet another Tony nomination; A Mass for the Dead (1968), an autobiographical family chronicle; A Cry of Players (1968), a speculative account of the life of young William Shakespeare (with Anne Bancroft starring for Gibson, this time as Shakespeare's wife, Anne Hathaway); American Primitive (1969), a verse play adapted from the letters of John and Abigail Adams, premiered at Williamstown Theatre Festival, directed by Frank Langella and starring Anne Bancroft; Goodly Creatures (1980), about Puritan dissident Anne Hutchinson; and Monday After the Miracle (1982), a continuation of the Helen Keller story. His ill-received Golda (1977), a work about Golda Meir became so popular in its revised version, titled Golda's Balcony (2003), that it set a record as the longest-running one-woman play in Broadway history on January 2, 2005.

1984 marked the debut of Raggedy Ann: The Musical Adventure, a dark fantasy about a sickly little girl who's whisked away on a quest to evade death, featuring the titular doll from popular children's stories, and songs by Sesame Street's Joe Raposo. The show traveled to Russia, where it was a smash-hit the following year under the title Rag Dolly, and then it closed on Broadway in 1986 with only 15 previews and 5 performances. Thanks to bootleg recordings, the show went on to garner a cult reputation on the internet.

== Other published works ==
In 1973, Gibson published A Season in Heaven, an account of his studies with Maharishi Mahesh Yogi in Punta Umbria and La Antilla, Spain. In 1954, Gibson published the novel The Cobweb, set in a psychiatric hospital resembling the Menninger Clinic; in 1955, the novel was adapted as a movie by Metro-Goldwyn-Mayer.

== Family and later life ==
Gibson married Margaret Brenman-Gibson, a psychotherapist and biographer of Clifford Odets, in 1940. After 1954, the couple moved from Topeka, Kansas, to Stockbridge, Massachusetts, where Margaret took a position as a psychoanalyst. She died in 2004.
