= Dinny and the Witches =

Play by William Gibson

Dinny and the Witches is a satirical comedy written by William Gibson in 1948, revised in 1961. It is a parody of the Cold War and nuclear scares of the 1960s, although the actual play takes place in the early 1950s in New York City, namely in Central Park. The show includes some singing, but not enough to warrant it musical status.

== Plot ==
In the very beginning of the play comes the curtain call, where characters enter "in order of their disappearance." (The audience is told that, in light of recent military developments - the invention of the nuclear weapon - the cast may not make it to the end of the performance.)

The play begins when three Shakespearean witches who run the world, Zenobia, Ulga, and Luella, try to take the life of a young musician Dinny. However, Dinny accidentally takes control of the world by playing his trumpet, which seduces the witches and stops the clock of time. A jump 100 years forward in time finds the world in turmoil. Finally, the witches manage to trick Dinny into agreeing to hand over the deed to the world while telling him that they will make his love, Amy, a perfect woman. Perfection, in the form of the seven deadly sins, kills her and the second act ends in Dinny's agony at seeing his dead lover on the ground.

The third act begins with Amy's burial. After paying his last respects, Dinny is surprised to see the three witches emerge from Amy's grave. Finally, the witches retrieve the deed to the world and try to kill Dinny, but only succeed in turning back time to 100 years ago, the beginning of the play. The future unfolds in a final singing number, with Dinny and Amy arguing lovingly over the life of their future baby.

== List of characters, in order of their disappearance ==
- Dawn, Chloe, and Bubbles (Algonquin 4-6099): Three devil-made, beautiful young women who come to Dinny because of one of his wishes.
- Ben: A blind man, one of the first whom Dinny helps.
- Jake: A homeless man, another one of the first whom Dinny helps.
- Stonehenge: The banker/controller of all the funds of the world, recognized in some interpretations as the devil.
- Tom, Dick, and Harry: The three kings of the world, from Atlantis, Ninevah, and Jersey City.
- Dinny: The main character, a young musician who accidentally wins the world from the witches by playing his trumpet.
- Amy: A waitress whom Dinny learns to love throughout the play.
- Luella: The youngest of the three witches in charge of life.
- Ulga: The middle, death witch who hates humans.
- Zenobia: The eldest main witch, in charge of the other two.
