= Dinny Meehan =

American gang leader

- Born: Dennis L. Meehan; June 5, 1889; Brooklyn, New York, USA
- Died: March 31, 1920 (aged 30); Red Hook, Brooklyn, New York, USA
- Cause of death: Assassination by gunshot
- Allegiance: White Hand Gang
- Criminal charges: Robbery, hijacking

Details
- Imprisoned at: Elmira Reformatory; Blackwell's Island; City Workhouse

Dennis L. Meehan (June 5, 1889 – March 31, 1920) was the leader of the White Hand Gang in the 1910s. Dinny Meehan was described by the police as "the most desperate gang leader in Brooklyn."

== Biography ==
Born in Brooklyn, Meehan apparently joined the White Hand Gang in his late teens. In 1912, he was arrested for shooting and killing John "Christie" Maroney, who led a faction of White Handers from the Navy Yard section of Brooklyn. After a sensational trial where police reserves were called in for fear of rioting if Meehan was convicted, Meehan was surprisingly acquitted, adding to his criminal reputation. Over the years he had served time in the Elmira Reformatory, Blackwell's Island, and the City Workhouse. Dinny often boasted that he would never see the inside of a state penitentiary.

Unlike some crime bosses, Dinny Meehan often joined his men on criminal jobs. By 1920, there were a total of three cases pending against him; he was out of jail on a $5,000 bond for robbing a man on Fifth Avenue, leading his men in the hijacking of a truckload of shoes worth $10,000, and overseeing the theft of $10,000 worth of silk from a Red Hook warehouse.

On the afternoon of March 31, 1920, Dinny Meehan and his wife Sadie were asleep in bed at their apartment at 452 Warren Street in Red Hook. Their four-year-old son played in the living room while Sadie's mother, Rose Leighton, dozed in a recliner. Neither of them knew that five strange men were in the apartment until the last second. As the men made for the bedroom, the young boy admonished them not to wake his parents. The leader of the group playfully patted the youngster's head and said they just wanted to look in. A total of five shots were fired; one passed through Dinny Meehan's head and then lodged in the shoulder of his wife, who later recovered from her wounds. The gunmen dashed from the building and made their escape in an automobile truck.

Meehan's murder has been traditionally thought to have been arranged by Brooklyn Black Hand boss Frankie Yale and carried out by Yale's underboss, Augie Pisano, and two hitmen from Cleveland, Ralph DeSarno and Giovanni Sciacca. At the time of the killing, however, police believed that a possible motive was the gang leader's role in supplying strikebreakers to take the places of employees of the United Fruit Company on piers along the Hudson and East Rivers. These employees had recently walked out when their demands for higher wages were turned down. The arrest of a Frank Madden, an associate of the International Longshoremen's Association Local 856 and his subsequent plea of Not Guilty for the charge of Meehan's murder confirms this. It was also rumored that there was internal strife in the White Hand Gang. Just before his murder, Meehan was acquitted in a robbery case while one of his henchman, Edward Gilchrist, was convicted. Dinny was said to have "double-crossed" Gilchrist, causing resentment within his gang. Sadie Meehan told police in November 1923 that her husband's killer was, in fact, Wild Bill Lovett, head of the arch-rival Jay Street Gang. Meehan's murder has remained officially unsolved.
