= White Hand Gang =

Collection of Irish American gangs in New York City

- Founder: Dinny Meehan
- Years active: Early 1900s–1925
- Ethnicity: Irish American
- Activities: protection money
- Rivals: Black Hand gangs Italian gangsters
- Notable members: Bill Lovett; Richard Lonergan

The White Hand Gang was a collection of various Irish American gangs on the New York City, Brooklyn, and Red Hook waterfronts from the early 1900s to 1925 who organized against the growing influence of Italian gangsters. Their name was chosen in response to the Sicilian Black Hand gangs and carried the implication that the Irish gang was the "white" counter to the growing presence of what they considered "non-white" Italian gangsters and Italian immigrants. They were known to be virulently anti-Italian and particularly violent, with members killing each other, contributing to the unstable leadership which led to the gang's demise.

== History ==
The gang was founded by Dinny Meehan, who was shot and killed while sleeping in his home with his wife at his side. His successor, Bill Lovett, aggressively confronted the Italian gangs until his death on November 1, 1923. The most known story of his death goes like this: While passed out at a bar, Lovett was shot several times before Sicilian assassin Willie "Two-Knife" Altieri killed him with a meat cleaver. However, this is unproven. The facts are that Lovett drunkenly stumbled into the back room of an abandoned store with an old gang associate and fell asleep. Police believe sometime during the night two men entered and Lovett was beaten in the head with a blunt instrument and then shot 3 times in the head. When questioned, his associate told police he had conveniently awoken at 2 or 3 o'clock in the morning and returned home. The police believe that the true murderers were probably connected with Lovett's own gang, or a rival Irish gang.

Lovett's brother-in-law Richard Lonergan, who had become leader before Lovett was killed, began an even more aggressive attack against Vincent Mangano, Albert Anastasia, and Joe Adonis, who had begun moving in on the waterfront. On the night of December 25, 1925, Lonergan and five of his men (Aaron Harms, James "Ragtime" Howard, Paddy Maloney, Cornelius Ferry, and James Hart) entered the Adonis Social Club, a Mafia-owned South Brooklyn speakeasy, during a Christmas celebration. Lonergan and the other White Handers, according to witnesses, were intoxicated and being unruly with the Italian patrons. Lonergan himself loudly and openly called nearby customers "wops", "dagos" and other ethnic slurs. When three local Irish girls entered the club escorted by their Italian dates, Lonergan chased them out supposedly yelling at them to "Come back with white men, fer chrissake!". It was at that moment that the lights went out and gunfire was heard. When the lights came on Lonergan, Harms, and Ferry lay shot to death on the dance floor. Police suspected visiting Al Capone, who had been forced to leave New York in 1921 after an altercation with a White Hand gang member, but there was no evidence and the case was dropped. Without strong leadership, the White Hand disappeared, and by 1928, the Mafia completely controlled the waterfront.
