= Two for the Seesaw (film) =

1962 film by Robert Wise

- Original film poster by Mitchell Hooks
- Directed by: Robert Wise
- Screenplay by: Isobel Lennart
- Based on: Two for the Seesaw; 1958 play by William Gibson
- Produced by: Walter Mirisch
- Starring: Robert Mitchum; Shirley MacLaine
- Cinematography: Ted D. McCord
- Edited by: Stuart Gilmore
- Music by: André Previn
- Distributed by: United Artists
- Release date: November 21, 1962
- Running time: 119 minutes
- Country: United States
- Language: English
- Budget: $3 million
- Box office: $1,750,000 (US/ Canada rentals)

Two for the Seesaw is a 1962 American romantic-drama film directed by Robert Wise and starring Robert Mitchum and Shirley MacLaine. It was adapted from the 1958 Broadway play written by William Gibson with Henry Fonda and Anne Bancroft (who was awarded the 1958 Tony Award for Best Featured Actress in a Play) in the lead roles.

== Plot ==
Jerry Ryan (Mitchum) is a lawyer from Nebraska who has recently separated from his wife, Tess, and moved into a shabby apartment in New York City. He is struggling with the divorce, which is still being finalized, and takes long walks at night.

At a party, he meets Gittel Mosca (MacLaine), a struggling dancer. They instantly get along and begin to fall in love. But the relationship is hampered by their differences in background and temperament, and Jerry has difficulty separating himself emotionally from his wife.

Jerry gets a job with a New York law firm and prepares to take the bar examination. He helps Gittel rent a loft for a dance studio, which she rents out to other dancers, and they prepare to move in together.

Gittel becomes upset when she learns that Jerry's divorce from Tess has been finalized and he did not tell her about it. Jerry explains that even though he is divorced from his ex-wife on paper, they remain bonded in many ways. Jerry and Gittel break up, and Jerry decides to return to Nebraska to make up with Tess. Later, Jerry calls Gittel to say goodbye and they admit that they love each other.

== Cast ==
- Robert Mitchum as Jerry Ryan
- Shirley MacLaine as Gittel Mosca
- Edmon Ryan as Frank Taubman
- Elisabeth Fraser as Sophie
- Eddie Firestone as Oscar
- Billy Gray as Mister Jacoby

== Production ==
The play was acquired by Seven Arts Productions for $350,000 plus a percentage of its earning. Another account said the purchase price was $600,000.

Elizabeth Taylor was signed to star with the possibility of Gregory Peck co-starring. Later, Paul Newman was slated to star opposite Taylor in the film but when Taylor was forced to drop out because of shooting overruns on Cleopatra, Newman was free to take the role of 'Fast Eddie' Felson in The Hustler.

"Second Chance", the title tune, became a pop music and jazz standard, recorded by Sammy Davis Jr. and other artists. At the 35th Academy Awards, the "Song From Two for the Seesaw (Second Chance)" from Two for the Seesaw – Music by André Previn; Lyric by Dory Langdon was nominated for Best Original Song but lost to Days of Wine and Roses. The movie was also nominated for Best Cinematography, Black and White (Ted D. McCord). However, The Longest Day (Jean Bourgoin and Walter Wottitz) triumphed over it.

MacLaine later said that she and Mitchum began a relationship during the filming of this movie that lasted three years.

The film was due to be shot over 60 days at the Samuel Goldwyn Studio in West Hollywood, California plus location shooting in New York.

== See also ==
- List of American films of 1962
