= Two for the Seesaw (play) =

Play by William Gibson

- Original language: English
- Written by: William Gibson
- Characters: Jerry Ryan; Gittel Mosca
- Subject: Love and marriage
- Genre: Drama
- Setting: 1957/58, between Fall and Spring, in two New York City rooms - Jerry's and Gittel's.

Premiere
- Date: January 16, 1958
- Place: Booth Theatre, Manhattan
- Directed by: Arthur Penn
- Original run: January 16, 1958 — October 31, 1959

Two for the Seesaw is a three-act, two-person play written by William Gibson. The play opened on Broadway on January 16, 1958, at the Booth Theatre in New York and ran for 750 performances, closing on October 31, 1959. With the opening cast of Henry Fonda (Jerry Ryan) and Anne Bancroft (Gittel Mosca), the play was directed by Arthur Penn and produced by Fred Coe. A surprise hit, Two for the Seesaw earned Anne Bancroft, making her Broadway debut, her first Tony Award for Best Featured Actress in a Play. The play was adapted into a film of the same name in 1962, directed by Robert Wise and starring Robert Mitchum and Shirley MacLaine, and was later adapted into the musical Seesaw in 1973. The play marked the Broadway debut of writer William Gibson, who would later collaborate with Penn and Coe on the play and film adaptations of The Miracle Worker, which also featured Bancroft in the lead role.

Published in 1959, a year after Two for the Seesaw opened on Broadway, The Seesaw Log, Gibson's production notes on the development of Two for the Seesaw from his point of view as its author, provides a detailed history of the play from its formation to its opening night and subsequent reception.

== Plot summary ==
=== Act I ===
Jerry Ryan, a recently divorced middle-aged attorney, moves from Omaha, Nebraska, to New York in order to separate himself from his ex-wife, Tess. Gittel Mosca, eccentric Bronx native, is a freewheeling dancer who struggles with ailments to her stomach. The play opens in September, with Ryan calling Mosca after an off-screen chance meeting. The two arrange a date, and the first act ends with Ryan and Mosca becoming romantically involved.

=== Act II ===
Time has passed. It is now October, and the differences between Ryan and Mosca are becoming more pronounced as the two spend more time together. Mosca, who is characterized as someone who eternally gives and never receives, serves as a direct contrast to Ryan, who eternally leans on others. As Ryan tries to find work as an attorney, Mosca falls victim to a bleeding ulcer. The second act ends in February, with Ryan ushering Mosca off to a hospital.

=== Act III ===
The third act opens in March, with Mosca healing from her bleeding ulcer and Ryan taking care of her. During this act, Ryan's out-of-town calls with his ex-wife Tess become more frequent, leading him to reveal to Mosca that he is still in love with her. Ryan moves back to Nebraska to heal his relationship with Tess, while Mosca remains in New York. The play ends in May, with a final phone call between Ryan and Mosca, thanking each other for a brief, but meaningful, relationship.

== Production history ==
=== The Seesaw Log ===
In The Seesaw Log, the lifespan of Two for the Seesaw from its inception in 1953 to its opening night in January 1958 is recalled, through production anecdotes, by playwright William Gibson. The book divulges a comprehensive financial history of the play and Gibson's frustrations with writing and rewriting to please an audience and his production team as a first-time Broadway playwright, as well as what seemed, for Gibson, the hollow victory of the play's eventual commercial success. The Seesaw Log also voices Gibson's challenges in accommodating the man's role to suit the standards of Henry Fonda, who served as the primary financial beneficiary of the production, as well as the discovery and casting of Anne Bancroft in what became her star-making role as Gittel Mosca. The book has been praised as a “uniquely honest, as well as informative, statement of what it means to have a play produced on Broadway at the present time."

=== Inception ===
Gibson claimed that the image for the play came to him in early 1953, as he was in the middle of writing his novel, The Cobweb. The first act of the play was finished in summer 1955, and Gibson recalled that the first person he read the act to was Arthur Penn, then working as a television director, who would later become the director of the stage production. By mid-November 1956, Gibson had completed his three-act play, Two for the Seesaw, which, by then, had a director, Penn, and producer, Fred Coe, attached to the project.

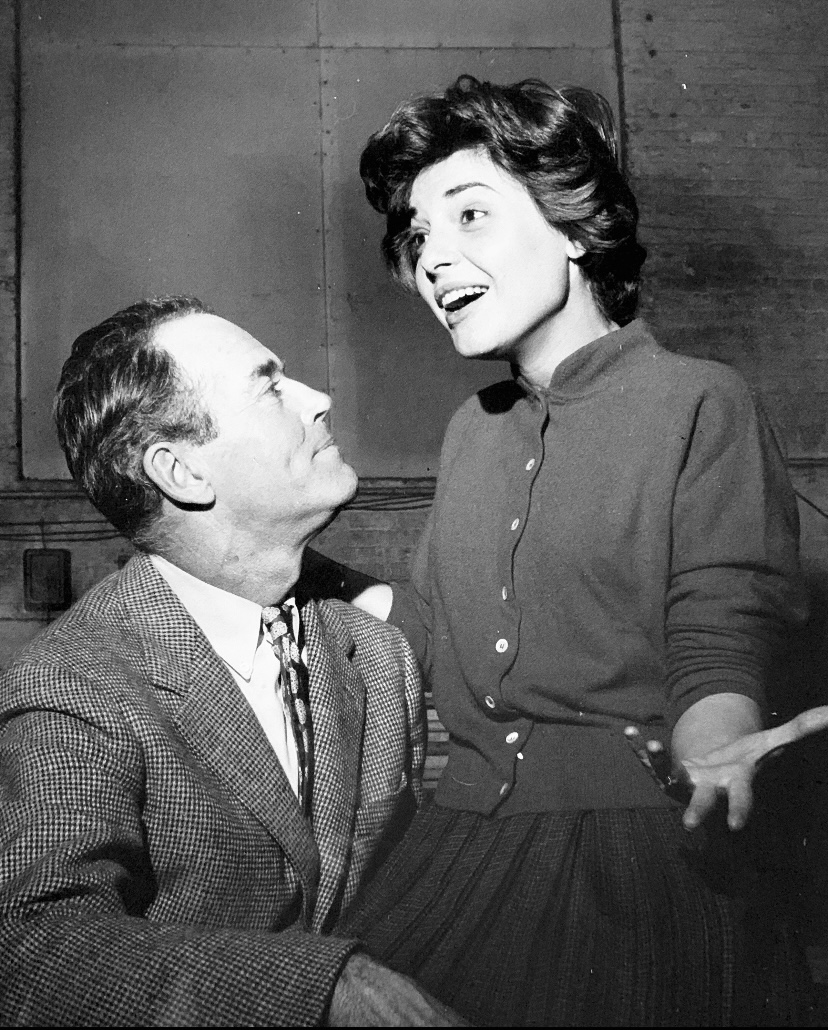
Anne Bancroft and Henry Fonda rehearsing for the Broadway play, Two for the Seesaw, c. 1957. Photographed by Arthur Cantor.

=== Casting ===
During the beginning stages of the play's production, Gibson detailed difficulties with casting the two lead roles. Actresses considered for the role of Gittel Mosca included Gwen Verdon, Lee Grant, Gaby Rodgers, Julie Harris, and Kim Stanley. According to Gibson, “the difficulty in casting the girl was that she was very specifically written, a Jewish gamin from the Bronx, and not one of the eminent actresses we named had anything of her quality.” The role of Gittel Mosca eventually went to a then-minor movie and television actress, Anne Bancroft. Of his first impression of Bancroft as Gittel Mosca, Gibson noted, “my mind blinked; she could’ve walked off my pages.” With the part of Gittel Mosca cast, the production team turned their focus to the part of the man, Jerry Ryan. Copies of Two for the Seesaw were sent to Barry Nelson, Eli Wallach, Don Murray, Robert Preston, Jack Lemmon, Van Heflin, and Paul Newman, who either declined the role outright or eventually declined. Henry Fonda, who was also sent the play, showed enthusiasm for the role of the man, and agreed to talk with Gibson, Penn, and Coe. After a table reading with Bancroft, Fonda signed onto the project with the caveat of additional rewrites on behalf of his character. Fonda, an experienced actor of the stage and screen, became the primary selling point and financial beneficiary of Two for the Seesaw.

Due to his six month contract, Henry Fonda left the production on June 28, 1958, and was replaced by Dana Andrews, making his Broadway debut in the role of Jerry Ryan. Andrews and Bancroft remained with the production until June 27, 1959. On leaving the play, in an interview with Larry Swindell for The Herald Statesman, Bancroft noted,

I have mixed emotions. I am happy for the relief, the change. But I have misgivings because I haven't solved all the acting problems. At first it was a matter of learning to meet them. During the first year I fell into all the traps; only more recently have I learned that you can't deny the life process of growth itself. My performances have grown as I've learned to solve the same problems in different ways. So, in the same role, I'm still progressing as an actress, but I'm leaving the play when I still am troubled by new problems of characterization.

Lee Grant then replaced Bancroft in the role of Gittel Mosca. Hal March replaced Andrews as Jerry Ryan until September 5, 1959, when he was then replaced by Jeffrey Lynn. Grant and Lynn remained with the production until it closed on October 31, 1959.

=== Development ===
In a breakdown of production expenses, Gibson provided that it cost $74,179.38 to get the play mounted. The production of Two for the Seesaw was riddled with hardships, including Gibson's troubled relationship with one of its stars, Henry Fonda, and the playwright's struggle to rewrite the play to accommodate an audience as well as Fonda's expectations. Reflecting on the process of bringing Two for the Seesaw to the Broadway stage, Gibson wrote, "In one word, the play is, in the image of its maker, imperfect." Though the playwright and the production team of Two for the Seesaw encountered difficulties throughout rehearsals and out-of-town tryouts, the play itself as well as Gibson's prosaic account of its production in The Seesaw Log were heralded for championing “metropolitan audiences by clever accommodation to their standards of taste, interest, and value.”

== Reception ==
Upon its opening night, Two for the Seesaw was met with mixed to positive reviews, heralded as “one of those simple, pleasant plays that obviously belong in the theatre, since they are almost always highly popular.” Following the fifth week after the play opened on Broadway at the Booth Theatre, the total expenses of the production resulted in $15,826.35, with an operating profit of $8,597.73.

Anne Bancroft's Broadway debut was praised, as a review from John Chapman of the Daily News from January 18, 1958, claimed, “her timing of movement and speech are flawless, and her warmth of personality is more than considerable.” Tony Award nominations for Two for the Seesaw included Best Play, Arthur Penn for Best Director, and Anne Bancroft for Best Featured Actress in a Play, which she won. Bancroft also was the recipient of a Theatre World Award for her performance during the 1958 Broadway season.

== Adaptations ==
=== Film ===
A film version of Two for the Seesaw was released in 1962 to mixed reviews and earned a fraction of its budget in box office sales. The film was directed by Robert Wise and starred Shirley MacLaine as Gittel Mosca and Robert Mitchum as Jerry Ryan. Rights to the play were acquisitioned by The Mirisch Company for Elizabeth Taylor, who originally expressed interest in playing the role of Gittel Mosca. Paul Newman was originally slated to be her co-star, but due to scheduling conflicts with Taylor filming Cleopatra, Newman joined the cast of The Hustler, and the lead roles went to MacLaine and Mitchum. Though Gibson is credited as a writer, he was not a creative consultant on the film, and Isobel Lennart was credited for adapting the play for the screen.

The film holds a 43% critics score on Rotten Tomatoes based on seven reviews.

=== Musical ===
The play was adapted into a musical named Seesaw, which opened at the Gershwin Theatre (then known as the Uris Theatre) on March 18, 1973, and closed after a total run of 296 performances and 25 previews. The musical book was written by Michael Bennett, and the stage production featured music by Cy Coleman with lyrics by Dorothy Fields.

== Awards and nominations ==
=== Original Broadway production ===
Year	Award	Category	Nominee	Result
1958	Tony Award	Best Play		Nominated
1958	Tony Award	Best Featured Actress in a Play	Anne Bancroft	Won
1958	Tony Award	Best Director	Arthur Penn	Nominated
1958	Theatre World Award		Anne Bancroft	Won
