= Dinny Falvey =

Irish Gaelic footballer

Personal information
- Born: Tralee, County Kerry

Sport
- Sport: Gaelic football
- Position: Full-forward
Club
- Years: Club
- 1940s-1960s: Kerins O'Rahilly's
Club titles
- Kerry titles: 3
Inter-county
Years	County	Apps (scores)
1951-1961	Kerry	26 (1-22)
Inter-county titles
- Munster titles: 6
- All-Irelands: 2
- NFL: 2

Dinny Falvey was a Gaelic football player from Annascaul in County Kerry. At club level with the local Kerins O'Rahilly's and later Annascaul.

He played intercounty football with Kerry at minor, junior and senior level. He never played championship football at senior level but played in the league. At minors. he won a Munster Minor Football Championship in 1949; Kerry went on to make it to the All-Ireland Minor Football Championship final but lost out to Aramagh GAA. At junior level he won a Munster Championship in 1961.

He had much success with Kerins O'Rahilly's winning three Kerry Senior Football Championship medals in 1953, 1954 and 1957. He also played with West Kerry in the 1960 but lost to John Mitchels. His son Tim also won a Kerry Senior Football Championship in 1990 with West Kerry and played with Annascaul during the 90's. His other son Brendan also won All-Ireland Vocational Schools Championship in 1991 with Tralee Community College.
