= St. Rosalia Church (Brooklyn) =

Church of St. Rosalia
- Location within New York City
- 40°37′36″N 74°0′13″W
- Location: 6301 14th Avenue; Brooklyn, New York
- Country: United States
- Denomination: Roman Catholic
- Website: basilicaofreginapacis.org

History
- Status: closed
- Founded: 1902
- Founder: Rev. P. Sapienza
- Dedication: Saint Rosalia

Architecture
- Architectural type: parish church
- Completed: 1905
- Closed: June 2016

Administration
- Diocese: Brooklyn
- Parish: Parish of St. Rosalia-Regina Pacis

Clergy
- Bishop: Most Rev. Nicholas DiMarzio
- Pastor: Rev. Msgr. Ronald T. Marino

The Church of St. Rosalia (Italian: Chiesa Cattolica Italiana Romana di St. Rosalia) was a parish church in the Borough Park neighborhood of Brooklyn, New York. The parish was founded to serve the needs of Italian Catholics in the area by the then-Bishop of Brooklyn, Charles McDonnell, in 1902. It was placed under the patronage of Saint Rosalia, the patron saint of Palermo, Italy, a region from which many of the Italian-born parishioners hailed. The founding pastor was P. Sapienza, who conducted the first Masses in a converted three-story clapboard house on 62nd Street near 13th Avenue. Within a few years, a small permanent church was constructed to serve the congregation. The parish came to be considered the "Mother Church of Italian immigrants" of the diocese.

In 1923 Angelo Raffaelle Cioffi, a native of Cervinara in the Italian Province of Avellino, who had emigrated to the United States in 1907 as a seminarian, was appointed pastor of the parish by Thomas Edmund Molloy, then Bishop of Brooklyn. He stayed in the parish until his death in 1979.

In 1972, the parish obtained an organ built in 1928 by the Skinner Organ Company, which had originally served a Congregational church in Connecticut.

== Shrine Church of Regina Pacis ==
At a Sunday Mass in May 1942—during the course of World War II, Cioffi urged his congregation to build a shrine dedicated to Mary, under her title of Queen of Peace, for the safe return of the men of the parish and country from the battlefields of the war and for a just and lasting peace. The parishioners accepted the challenge and vowed to erect the church. A building fund was then established which included plans for the projected shrine, as well the construction of a new convent, and the enlargement of the parish school. The Shrine of Regina Pacis was completed and dedicated in August 1951.

Within a week, a pair of gold crown created from the jewelry of the faithful to honor the image of the patroness of the shrine had been stolen. The theft made national headlines. Very shortly, the objects were returned through the mail, leading the pastor and others to declare it a miracle.

== Closure ==
With the passing of the years, the Italian population of the area came to be replaced by members of other ethnic groups, most noticeably Spanish and Chinese. By 2016 most of the services had moved to the shrine church, now a minor basilica, and the Diocese of Brooklyn had determined that the expenses of running the original church were not sustainable. The decision was made to close St. Rosalia Church permanently and to move its operations to the basilica. This was done in June of that year and many of the church furnishings were transferred to other churches. The marble altar of the church and its main image of St. Rosalia were moved to the basilica, along with its vestments and memorial plaques.

In March 2018, the current pastor, Ronald T. Marino, announced that the site was to be sold as an empty lot, leading to the assumption that the church was to be demolished. Residents of the neighborhood united to oppose the demolition of the church. It was demolished in mid 2018.
