= Willie "Two-Knife" Altieri =

American mobster

Willie "Two-Knife" Altieri, also called Willie "Two Gun" Altieri, was an American gangster who served as the chief enforcer for Frankie Yale's Italian-American "Black-Hand" gang, one of the most powerful criminal organizations in 1920s New York City. He got his nickname after his preferred method of dispatching a victim. Willie had killed dozens of rival gangsters during the 1920s and was considered an important figure in the "Black-Hand" gang.

== Background ==
Little background information is known about Altieri, including his date of birth, background, or how he died although it is known that an attempted assassination by Pegleg Lonergan led to "Willie" jumping through a window, narrowly escaping death. He was described as standing 5 feet 7 inches, weighing 170 pounds, and having blond hair and blue eyes. Altieri's hands were described as "soft", like a woman's, and he would often be found using his knives to clean his fingernails. Altieri was known for preferring to dispatch his victims via the use of two knives, which he kept in leather scabbards around his waist. His passion was so great for these weapons that he would apparently even sleep with the knives still on his person.

Altieri killed his victims with the same modalities: a rape choking, or a Colt's gunshot close-up to the head of the victim. Each time he threw away the corpse, burying it in the surroundings of New Jersey.

== Criminal career ==
Mob boss Yale used Altieri on many occasions to commit murders. In 1919, Yale sent Altieri to silence an informer within the gang. Altieri stabbed the informer in the torso with both knives, then broke off blades in the victim's body. Altieri later presented the handles to Yale, who mounted them on a plaque and hung it up in his office.

At one point, Altieri himself narrowly avoided being assassinated. The White Hand Gang tried to kill Altieri because they suspected he was responsible for killing gang member Petey Behan. However, the White Hand hitmen accidentally killed Angelo Gibaldi, the father of Vincenzo Gibaldi. Vincenzo Gibaldi later became famous as a Capone gunman and a chief organizer of the Saint Valentine's Day massacre by another name, Jack "Machine Gun Jack" McGurn. In retaliation, Gibaldi with Frankie Yale's consent killed the three hitmen responsible and thus avenged his father's death.

== Yale murder ==
On July 1, 1928, Yale was murdered on the streets of Brooklyn. His killing was reportedly due to a falling out with Chicago mob boss Al Capone, Yale's former underling. After Yale's murder, Altieri slipped into obscurity.

Very little is known as to the whereabouts of Willie "Two-Knife" Altieri after the murder of Frankie Yale in 1928.
