= Daisy Tinney =

Early New Zealand woman photographer

- Born: April 27, 1893; Wellington, New Zealand
- Died: May 17, 1962 (aged 69); Wellington, New Zealand
- Known for: photography

Daisy Tinney (27 April 1893 – 17 May 1962) was a New Zealand photographer who lived in Hataitai, Wellington, New Zealand. Tinney's photography engaged with varied subject matter: she captured landscapes and landmarks from her travels around New Zealand, still lifes, and formal and informal portraits of her friends and family. She lived with her life-long partner Kath Whelan, and her mother, Elizabeth Tinney.

== Photography ==
The earliest records of Tinney's photographic practice date to the 1910s. She was part of an uptake in "amateur" photography made possible by Eastman Kodak's introduction, in the 1880s, of technology such as mass-produced dry plate glass negatives and handheld cameras. These technological innovations made photography less expensive, less complex and more accessible.

Tinney participated widely in the burgeoning photography culture of early twentieth-century New Zealand. She was a well-known member of the Wellington Camera Club, and entered various photography competitions around New Zealand. She won many prizes for her photographs of diverse subjects. Tinney was also one of four New Zealanders whose work was exhibited in the 1934 photography exhibition at the Athenaeum Gallery in Melbourne, as part of the broader Melbourne Centenary celebrations.

Tinney also undertook commercial photography work. In 1948, her calendar of photographs of dogs was advertised for sale at the Kodak store on Lambton Quay.

== Legacy ==
Although the whereabouts of much of Tinney's original photographs are unknown, three of her photographic albums were gifted to the Museum of New Zealand Te Papa Tongarewa in 2022.

Tinney's extant photography albums hold queer historical value as records of the relationship between Tinney and her partner Kath Whelan.
