= DYNY =

DYNY may refer to the following stations in Iloilo City:

- DYNY-FM, an FM station branded as Win Radio
- DYNY-TV, a television station branded as UNTV
