= Joe Adonis =

Italian-American mobster (1902–1971)

Joseph Adonis
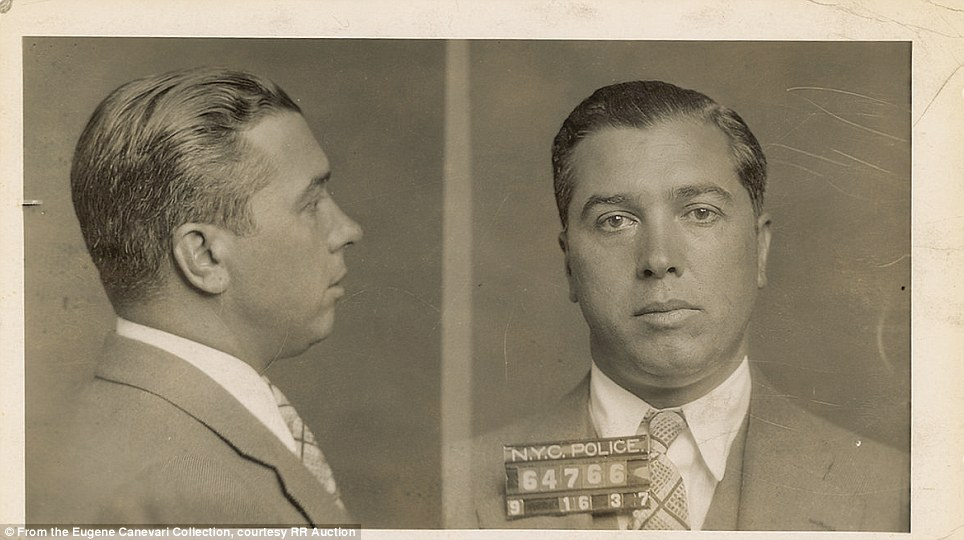
- Adonis' mugshot (1937)
- Born: Giuseppe Antonio Doto; November 22, 1902; Montemarano, Campania, Kingdom of Italy
- Died: November 26, 1971 (aged 69); Ancona, Marche, Italy
- Resting place: Madonna Cemetery, Fort Lee, New Jersey, U.S.
- Other names: Joey A. Joey Adonis; Joe Adone; Joe Arosa; James Arosa; Joe DeMio
- Occupation: Mobster
- Spouse: Jean Montemorano (m. 1932)
- Children: 4
- Allegiance: Genovese crime family
- Conviction: Illegal gambling (1951)
- Penalty: 2 to 3 years' imprisonment

Joseph Anthony Doto (born Giuseppe Antonio Doto, Italian: [dʒuˈzɛppe anˈtɔːnjo ˈdɔːto]; November 22, 1902 – November 26, 1971), known as Joe Adonis, was an Italian-American mobster who was an important participant in the formation of the modern Cosa Nostra crime families in New York City and the National Crime Syndicate. Doto became a powerful caporegime in the Luciano crime family.

== Early life ==
Adonis was born Giuseppe Antonio Doto on November 22, 1902, in the small town of Montemarano, Campania, Italy, to Michele Doto and Maria De Vito. He had three brothers, Antonio, Ettore and Genesio Doto.

In 1909, Adonis and his family immigrated to the United States, in New York City. As a young man, Adonis supported himself by stealing and picking pockets. While working on the streets, Adonis became friends with future mob boss Charles "Lucky" Luciano and mobster Settimo Accardi, who were involved in illegal gambling. Adonis developed a loyalty to Luciano that lasted for decades.

At the beginning of Prohibition, Luciano, Adonis, Meyer Lansky and Bugsy Siegel started a bootlegging operation in Brooklyn. This operation soon began supplying large amounts of alcohol to the show business community along Broadway in Manhattan. Doto soon assumed the role of a gentleman bootlegger, socializing with the theater elite.

In the early 1920s, Doto started calling himself "Joe Adonis" (Adonis was the Greek god of beauty and desire). It is uncertain as to what inspired his nickname. One story states that Adonis received this nickname from a Ziegfeld Follies chorus girl who was dating him. Another story says that Adonis adopted the name after reading a magazine article on Greek mythology.

Extremely vain, Adonis spent a great deal of time in personal grooming. On one occasion, Lucky Luciano saw Adonis combing his thick, dark hair in front of a mirror and asked him, "Who do you think you are, Rudolph Valentino?" Adonis replied, "For looks, that guy's a bum!". Adonis was a cousin of Luciano crime family capo Alan Bono, who supervised Adonis's operations in Greenwich Village, Manhattan.

Adonis married Jean Montemorano, and he had four children: Joseph Michael Doto, Jr., Maria Dolores Olmo, Ann Marie Arietta, and Elizabeth Doto. His son Joseph Doto, Jr., became a made member of the Genovese family and operated criminal rackets in Bergen county, New Jersey.

== Castellammarese War ==
In the 1920s, Adonis became an enforcer for Frankie Yale, the boss of some rackets in Brooklyn. While working for Yale, Adonis briefly met future Chicago Outfit boss Al Capone, who was also working for Yale. Meanwhile, Luciano became an enforcer for Giuseppe "Joe the Boss" Masseria.

Masseria soon became embroiled in the vicious Castellammarese War with his archrival, Salvatore Maranzano. Maranzano represented the Sicilian clans, most of which came from Castellammare del Golfo, Sicily. As the war progressed, both bosses started recruiting more soldiers. By 1930, Adonis had joined the Masseria faction. As the war turned against Masseria, Luciano secretly contacted Maranzano about switching sides. When Masseria heard about Luciano's betrayal, he approached Adonis about killing Luciano. However, Adonis instead warned Luciano about the murder plot.

On April 15, 1931, Adonis allegedly participated in Masseria's murder. Luciano had lured Masseria to a meeting at a Coney Island, Brooklyn, restaurant. During the meal, Luciano excused himself to go to the restroom. As soon as Luciano was gone, Adonis, Vito Genovese, Albert Anastasia, and Bugsy Siegel rushed into the dining room and shot Masseria to death. No one was ever indicted in the Masseria murder.

With the death of Masseria, the war ended, and Maranzano was the victor. To avoid any future wars, Maranzano reorganized all the Italian American gangs into the Five Families and anointed himself as capo di tutti capi ("boss of all bosses"). Luciano and his loyalists quickly became dissatisfied with Maranzano's power grab. When Luciano discovered that the suspicious Maranzano had ordered his murder, Luciano struck first. On September 10, 1931, several gunmen attacked and killed Maranzano in his Manhattan office.

== Criminal empire ==
Adonis and Luciano soon controlled bootlegging in Broadway and Midtown Manhattan. At its height, the operation grossed $12 million in one year and employed 100 workers. Adonis also bought car dealerships in New Jersey. When customers bought cars from his dealerships, the salesmen would intimidate them into buying "protection insurance" for the vehicle. Adonis soon moved into cigarette distribution, buying up vending machines by the hundreds and stocking them with stolen cigarettes. Adonis ran his criminal empire from Joe's Italian Kitchen, a restaurant that he owned in Brooklyn. By 1932, Adonis was also a major criminal power in Brooklyn. Despite his wealth, Adonis still participated in jewelry robberies, a throwback to his early criminal career on the streets.

In 1932, Adonis allegedly participated in the kidnapping and brutal beating in Brooklyn of Isidore Juffe and Issac Wapinsky. In 1931, Adonis had lent the two men money for investment and kidnapped them in 1932 after deciding that he should be receiving a higher profit. Two days after the kidnappings, Adonis released Juffe and Wapinsky after receiving a $5,000 ransom payment. A month later, Wapinsky died of internal injuries from being assaulted.

Adonis placed many politicians and high-ranking police officers on his payroll. Adonis used his political influence to assist members of the Luciano crime family, such as Luciano and Genovese, and mob associates such as Meyer Lansky and Louis "Lepke" Buchalter, the head of Murder, Inc. As a syndicate board member, Adonis, along with Buchalter, may have been responsible for assigning some murder contracts to Murder, Inc.

== Government scrutiny ==
In 1936, prosecutors convicted Luciano on pandering charges and sent him to state prison for 30 years. Underboss Vito Genovese was the acting boss in charge of the family until he fled to Italy in 1937 to avoid a murder prosecution. Luciano now left Frank Costello, an Adonis ally, in charge of the Luciano family and Adonis in charge of the Syndicate.

On April 27, 1940, Adonis was indicted in Brooklyn on charges of kidnapping, extortion, and assault in the 1932 Juffe/Wapinsky case. However, on February 24, 1941, the prosecutor requested a dismissal for lack of evidence.

In the 1940s, Adonis moved his gambling rackets to New Jersey after New York City Mayor Fiorello LaGuardia's campaign against illegal gambling had made it too difficult for him to do business in New York. Adonis also moved his family to a luxurious house in Fort Lee, New Jersey. Adonis set up a casino in Lodi, New Jersey, and provided limousine service there from New York City. During the same period, Adonis became partners with Meyer Lansky in an illegal casino in Hallandale Beach, Florida.

On February 10, 1946 Luciano was deported to Italy. In December 1946, Adonis and Luciano met at the famous Havana Conference of US organized crime bosses in Cuba. It was Luciano's goal at the conference to regain his mob influence, using Cuba as a base. Being a loyal supporter, Adonis willingly agreed to turn over his power in the syndicate to Luciano. However, the US government soon discovered Luciano's presence in Havana and pressured the Cuban government to expel him. On February 24, 1947, Luciano was placed on a ship by Cuban authorities for deportation back to Italy.

On December 12, 1950, Adonis was summoned before the US Senate Kefauver Commission on organized crime. Adonis repeatedly refused to testify, citing his right against self-incrimination under the Fifth Amendment to the United States Constitution. Although Adonis escaped contempt charges, he suffered undesirable national exposure as a mobster.

In late May 1951, Adonis and several associates pleaded no contest to charges of operating three gambling rooms in Lodi, New Jersey, and Fort Lee, New Jersey. On May 28, 1951, Adonis was sentenced in Hackensack, New Jersey to two to three years in state prison.

== Deportation and death ==
On August 6, 1953, at a hearing in Adonis's prison, the United States Department of Justice sought Adonis's deportation to Italy, arguing that Adonis was born in Italy and had never petitioned to become a naturalized U.S. citizen, and was therefore subject to deportation because he had re-entered the United States seven years ago after his visit to Cuba for the Havana Conference without the required permit, had failed to register under the Alien Registration Act, and had been convicted of a crime since his most recent entry. Adonis fought deportation, claiming that he was a native-born American citizen.

On August 9, 1953, Adonis was released from prison in New Jersey. His deportation was held in abeyance pending his appeal from that order.

On January 3, 1956, Adonis voluntarily left New York City on an ocean liner for Naples, Italy. His wife and children stayed behind in New Jersey.

Once in Italy, Adonis moved into a luxurious apartment in the center of Milan. Adonis may have met with Luciano in Naples, but there is no proof of it. Over time, the financially struggling Luciano grew angry at the wealthy Adonis for not helping him. On January 26, 1962, Luciano died of a heart attack in Naples at age 64. Adonis attended the funeral service in Naples, bringing a huge floral wreath with the words, "So Long, Pal".

In June 1971, the Italian government forced Adonis to leave his Milan residence and move to Serra de' Conti, a small town near the Adriatic Sea. Adonis was one of 115 suspected mobsters relocated to Serra de' Conti after the assassination in May of Pietro Scaglione, the public prosecutor of Palermo, Sicily. In late November 1971, Italian police forces transported Adonis to a small hillside shack near Ancona, Italy, for interrogation. During the lengthy questioning and some abusive treatment, Adonis suffered a heart attack. He was taken to a regional hospital in Ancona, where he died several days later on November 26, 1971.

=== Burial ===
The U.S. government allowed Adonis's family to bring his body back to the United States for burial. Adonis' funeral Mass was held at the Church of the Epiphany in Cliffside Park, New Jersey, attended only by his immediate family.

He is buried in Madonna Cemetery in Fort Lee, New Jersey under his family name of Joseph Antonio Doto.

== In popular culture ==
- Adonis is mentioned in The Valachi Papers (1972), starring Charles Bronson.
- Adonis is portrayed by James Purcell in the film Gangster Wars (1981) and in 1981 TV Series The Gangster Chronicles.
- In Bugsy (1991), Adonis is portrayed by Lewis Van Bergen.
- Adonis is portrayed in the television movie Lansky (1999) by Sal Landi, and Casey McFadden as Young Adonis.
- Adonis is featured in the television documentary series American Justice, which aired on A&E, and The Making of the Mob: New York (2015), which aired on AMC.
