= List of Playhouse 90 episodes =

The following is an episode list of the American CBS television anthology drama series Playhouse 90 that aired from 1956 to 1960, totaling 133 episodes within four seasons.

The network began airing hour-long teleplays broadcast live, with the intention to present the more unusual, hour-and-a-half-long dramas, thus the "90" in the show's title. Later shows in 1957 were taped, rather than live.

== Series overview ==
Season	Episodes	Originally released		Day / Time
Season	Episodes	First released	Last released	Day / Time
1	39	October 4, 1956	June 27, 1957	Thursday, 9:30 p.m. ET
2	40	September 12, 1957	August 7, 1958	Thursday, 9:30 p.m. ET
3	38	September 25, 1958	June 25, 1959	Thursday, 9:30 p.m. ET
4	16	October 1, 1959	May 18, 1960	Thursday at 9:30 pm (October 1, 1959 - January 21, 1960); Tuesday at 9:30 pm (February 9, 1960; March 22, 1960); Wednesday at 8:00 pm (February 24, 1960; May 18, 1960); Monday at 9:30 pm (March 7, 1960; May 2, 1960); Sunday at 9:30 pm (April 3, 1960); Friday at 9:30 pm (April 22, 1960)

== Episodes ==
=== Season 1 (1956–57) ===
No. overall	No. in season	Title	Directed by	Written by	Original release date	Ref.
1	1	"Forbidden Area"	John Frankenheimer	Rod Serling	October 4, 1956	
2	2	"Requiem for a Heavyweight"	Ralph Nelson	Rod Serling	October 11, 1956	
3	3	"Sizeman and Son"	Vincent J. Donehue	Elick Moll	October 18, 1956	
4	4	"Rendezvous in Black"	John Frankenheimer	Novel by : Cornell Woolrich; Teleplay by : James P. Cavanagh	October 25, 1956	
5	5	"The Country Husband"	James Neilson	Short story by : John Cheever; Teleplay by : Paul Monash	November 1, 1956	
6	6	"The Big Slide"	Ralph Nelson	Edmund Beloin, Dean Riesner	November 8, 1956	
7	7	"Heritage of Anger"	Vincent J. Donehue	Harold Jack Bloom	November 15, 1956	
8	8	"Eloise"	John Frankenheimer	Leonard Spigelgass	November 22, 1956	
9	9	"Confession"	Anton M. Leader	Devery Freeman	November 29, 1956	
10	10	"Made in Heaven"	Ralph Nelson	Hagar Wilde	December 6, 1956	
11	11	"Sincerely, Willis Wade"	Vincent J. Donehue	Novel by : John P. Marquand; Adapted by : Frank Gilroy	December 13, 1956	
12	12	"The Family Nobody Wanted"	John Frankenheimer	Memoir by : Helen Doss; Teleplay by : George Bruce	December 20, 1956	
13	13	"Massacre at Sand Creek"	Arthur Hiller	William Sackheim	December 27, 1956	
14	14	"Snowshoes: A Comedy of People and Horses"	Unknown	Unknown	January 3, 1957	
Cast : Barry Sullivan, Marilyn Maxwell, John Carradine, Harpo Marx, Kenny Delmar, and Stuart Erwin
15	15	"The Ninth Day"	Unknown	Unknown	January 10, 1957	
icon
16	16	"So Soon to Die"	Unknown	Unknown	January 17, 1957	
icon
17	17	"The Star Wagon"	Unknown	Unknown	January 24, 1957	
icon
18	18	"The Greer Case"	Ralph Nelson	Unknown	January 31, 1957	
icon
19	19	"The Miracle Worker"	Unknown	Unknown	February 7, 1957	
icon
20	20	"The Comedian"	John Frankenheimer	Story by : Ernest Lehman; Teleplay by : Rod Serling	February 14, 1957	
21	21	"One Coat of White"	Ralph Nelson	Unknown	February 21, 1957	
icon
22	22	"The Blackwell Story"	James Neilson	Mel Barr, Lloyd C. Douglas	February 28, 1957	
23	23	"Invitation to a Gunfighter"	Unknown	Unknown	March 7, 1957	
icon
24	24	"The Last Tycoon"	Unknown	Unknown	March 14, 1957	
icon
25	25	"The Hostess with the Mostes'"	Paul Nickell	Speed Lamkin, Hagar Wilde	March 21, 1957	
26	26	"Charley's Aunt"	Unknown	Unknown	March 28, 1957	
icon
27	27	"Clipper Ship"	Unknown	Unknown	April 4, 1957	
icon
28	28	"If You Know Elizabeth"	Unknown	Unknown	April 11, 1957	
icon
29	28	"Three Men on a Horse"	Unknown	Unknown	April 18, 1957	
icon
30	30	"Four Women in Black"	Unknown	Unknown	April 25, 1957	
icon
31	31	"Child of Trouble"	Unknown	Unknown	May 2, 1957	
icon
32	32	"Homeward Borne"	Arthur Hiller	Novel by : Ruth Chatterton; Teleplay by : Halsted Welles	May 9, 1957	
33	33	"Helen Morgan"	George Roy Hill	Leonard Spigelgass, Paul Monash	May 16, 1957	
34	34	"Winter Dreams"	Unknown	Unknown	May 23, 1957	
icon
35	35	"Circle of the Day"	Unknown	Unknown	May 30, 1957	
icon
36	36	"Without Incident"	Charles Marquis Warren	Story by : Charles Marquis Warren; Teleplay by : David Victor, Herbert Little Jr	June 6, 1957	
37	37	"Clash by Night"	Unknown	Unknown	June 13, 1957	
icon
38	38	"Ain't No Time for Glory"	Unknown	Unknown	June 20, 1957	
icon
39	39	"The Fabulous Irishman"	John Frankenheimer	Elick Moll	June 27, 1957	

=== Season 2 (1957–58) ===
No. overall	No. in season	Title	Directed by	Written by	Original release date	Ref.
40	1	"The Death of Manolete"	John Frankenheimer	Barnaby Conrad, Paul Monash	September 12, 1957	
41	2	"The Dark Side of the Earth"	Arthur Penn	Rod Serling	September 19, 1957	
42	3	"Topaze"	Vincent J. Donehue	Play by : Marcel Pagnol; Adapted by : Ellis St. Joseph	September 26, 1957	
43	4	"A Sound of Different Drummers"	John Frankenheimer	Robert Alan Aurthur	October 3, 1957	
44	5	"The Playroom"	Franklin Schaffner	Tad Mosel	October 10, 1957	
45	6	"Around the World in 90 Minutes"	Byron Paul	Unknown	October 17, 1957	
46	7	"The Mystery of Thirteen"	Robert Mulligan	Story by : Robert Graves; Adapted by : David Shaw	October 24, 1957	
47	8	"The Edge of Innocence"	Arthur Hiller	Berne Giler	October 31, 1957	
48	9	"The Clouded Image"	Franklin J. Schaffner	Story by : Josephine Tey; Adapted by : James P. Cavanaugh	November 7, 1957	
49	10	"The Jet Propelled Couch"	Burgess Meredith and James Clark	Story by : Robert M. Lindner; Adapted by : Stanley Roberts	November 14, 1957[	
50	11	"The Troublemakers"	John Frankenheimer	Adapted by : George Bellak	November 21, 1957	
51	12	"Panic Button"	Franklin Schaffner	Rod Serling	November 28, 1957	
52	13	"Galvanized Yankee"	Paul Wendkos	Novel by : Gordon D. Shirreffs; Adapted by : Russell S. Hughes	December 5, 1957	
53	14	"The Thundering Wave"	John Frankenheimer	Robert Alan Aurthur	December 12, 1957	
54	15	"For I Have Loved Strangers"	Franklin Schaffner	Story by : Don Murray, Fred Clasel; Adapted by : Elick Moll	December 19, 1957	
55	16	"The Lone Woman"	Unknown	Al C. Ward	December 26, 1957	
56	17	"Reunion"	Allan Reisner	Merle Miller	January 2, 1958	
57	18	"The Last Man"	John Frankenheimer	Aaron Spelling	January 9, 1958	
58	19	"The 80 Yard Run"	Franklin Schaffner	Story by : Irwin Shaw; Adapted by : David Shaw	January 16, 1958	
59	20	"Before I Die"	Arthur Hiller	Berne Giler	January 23, 1958	
60	21	"The Gentleman From Seventh Avenue"	Allen Reisner	Elick Moll	January 30, 1958	
61	22	"The Violent Heart"	John Frankenheimer	Short story by : Daphne du Maurier; Adapted by : Leslie Stevens	February 6, 1958	
62	23	"No Time at All"	David Swift	David Swift, Charles Einstein	February 13, 1958	
63	24	"Point of No Return"	Franklin Schaffner	Novel by : John P. Marquand; Adapted by : Frank D. Gilroy	February 20, 1958[	
64	25	"Portrait of a Murderer"	Arthur Penn	Story by : Abby Mann; Adapted by : Leslie Stevens	February 27, 1958	
65	26	"The Last Clear Chance"	George Roy Hill	A. E. Hotchner	March 6, 1958	
66	27	"The Male Animal"	Unknown	Play by : James Thurber, Elliott Nugent; Adapted by : Helene Hanff	March 13, 1958	
67	28	"The Right Hand Man"	Franklin Schaffner	Story by : Garson Kanin; Adapted by : Dick Berg	February 28, 1958	
68	29	"Turn Left at Mount Everest"	Unknown	Play by : Lowell Barrington; Adapted by : Del Reisman	April 3, 1958	
69	30	"The Dungeon"	David Swift	David Swift	April 17, 1958	
70	31	"Verdict of Three"	Buzz Kulik	Novel by : Raymond Postgate; Adapted by : James P. Cavanagh	April 24, 1958	
71	32	"Rumors of Evening"	John Frankenheimer	Story by : F.W. Durkee; Adapted by : Leslie Stevens	May 1, 1958	
72	33	"Not the Glory"	Robert Mulligan	Novel by : Pierre Boulle; Adapted by : David Shaw	May 8, 1958	
73	34	"Nightmare at Ground Zero"	Franklin Schaffner	Book by : John C. Clark, Robert Cahn; Teleplay by : Rod Serling, Paul Monash	May 15, 1958	
74	35	"Bomber's Moon"	John Frankenheimer	Rod Serling	May 22, 1958	
75	36	"Natchez"	David Lowell Rich	Story by : E. A. Ellington; Teleplay by : Martin M. Goldsmith	May 29, 1958	
76	37	"The Innocent Sleep"	Franklin Schaffner	Tad Mosel	June 5, 1958	
77	38	"A Town Has Turned to Dust"	John Frankenheimer	Rod Serling	June 19, 1958	
78	39	"The Great Gatsby"	Franklin Schaffner	Novel by : F. Scott Fitzgerald; Adapted by : David Shaw	June 26, 1958	
79	40	"A Bitter Heritage"	Paul Wendkos	Joseph Landon	August 7, 1958	

=== Season 3 (1958–59) ===
No. overall	No. in season	Title	Directed by	Written by	Original release date	Ref.
80	1	"The Plot to Kill Stalin"	Delbert Mann	David Karp	September 25, 1958	
81	2	"Days of Wine and Roses"	John Frankenheimer	JP Miller	October 2, 1958	
82	3	"The Time of Your Life"	Tom Donovan	Play by : William Saroyan; Adapted by : A. J. Russell	October 9, 1958	
83	4	"The Long March"	Delbert Mann	Novel by : William Styron; Adapted by : Roger O. Hirson	October 16, 1958	
84	5	"Shadows Tremble"	Herbert Hirschman	Ernest Kinoy	October 23, 1958	
85	6	"Word From a Sealed-Off Box"	Franklin Schaffner	Book by : Henriette Roosenburg; Adapted by : Mayo Smith	October 30, 1958	
86	7	"Heart of Darkness"	Ronald Winston	Stewart Stern	November 6, 1958	
87	8	"Old Man"	John Frankenheimer	Novel by : William Faulkner; Adapted by : Horton Foote	November 20, 1958	
88	9	"The Return of Ansel Gibbs"	Ralph Nelson	Novel by : Frederick Buechner; Adapted by : David Davidson	November 27, 1958	
89	10	"Free Weekend"	Fielder Cook	Steven Gethers	December 4, 1958	
90	11	"Seven Against the Wall"	Franklin J. Schaffner	Story by : Howard Browne; Adapted by : David Davidson	December 11, 1958	
91	12	"The Nutcracker"	Ralph Nelson	Music by : Pyotr Ilyich Tchaikovsky	December 25, 1958	
92	13	"Face of a Hero"	John Frankenheimer	Novel by : Pierre Boulle; Adapted by : Robert L. Joseph	January 1, 1959	
93	14	"The Wings of the Dove"	Robert Stevens	Book by : Henry James; Adapted by : Meade Roberts	January 8, 1959	
94	15	"The Blue Men"	John Frankenheimer	Alvin Boretz	January 15, 1959	
95	16	"The Velvet Alley"	Franklin Schaffner	Rod Serling	January 22, 1959	
96	17	"A Quiet Game of Cards"	Alex Segal	Reginald Rose	January 29, 1959	
97	18	"Child of Our Time"	George Roy Hill	book by : Michel del Castillo; Adapted by : Irving Gaynor Neiman	February 5, 1959	
98	19	"The Second Man"	Unknown	Book by : Edward Grierson; Adapted by : Leslie Stevens	February 12, 1959	
99	20	"The Raider"	Franklin Schaffner	Loring Mandel	February 19, 1959	
100	21	"The Dingaling Girl"	Fielder Cook	JP Miller	February 26, 1959	
101	22	"Made in Japan"	Herbert Hirschman	Leslie Stevens	March 5, 1959	
102	23	"For Whom the Bell Tolls"	John Frankenheimer	Novel by : Ernest Hemingway; Teleplay by : A. E. Hotchner	March 12, 1959	
103	24	"For Whom the Bell Tolls"	John Frankenheimer	Novel by : Ernest Hemingway; Teleplay by : A. E. Hotchner	March 19, 1959	
104	25	"A Trip to Paradise"	Buzz Kulik	Adrian Spies	March 26, 1959	
105	26	"In Lonely Expectation"	Franklin Schaffner	Mayo Simon	April 2, 1959	
106	27	"The Day Before Atlanta"	Ralph Nelson	John Gay	April 9, 1959	
107	28	"Judgment at Nuremberg"	George Roy Hill	Abby Mann	April 16, 1959	
108	29	"A Corner of the Garden"	Robert Stevens	Tad Mosel	April 23, 1959	
109	30	"Dark December"	Franklin Schaffner	Merle Miller	April 30, 1959	
110	31	"Diary of a Nurse"	David Greene	Arthur Hailey	May 7, 1959	
111	32	"A Marriage of Strangers"	Alex Segal	Reginald Rose	May 14, 1959	
112	33	"Out of Dust"	Unknown	Play by : Lynn Riggs; Adapted by : John Gay	May 21, 1959	
113	34	"The Rank and File"	Franklin Schaffner	Rod Serling	May 28, 1959	
114	35	"The Killers of Mussolini"	Buzz Kulik	A. E. Hotchner	June 4, 1959	
115	36	"Project Immortality"	Fielder Cook	Loring Mandel	June 11, 1959	
116	37	"Dark as the Night"	Terence Young	Story by : James Hadley Chase; Adapted by : Marc Brandel	June 18, 1959	
117	38	"The Second Happiest Day"	Ralph Nelson	Novel by : John Phillips; Adapted by : Steven Gethers	June 25, 1959	

=== Season 4 (1959–60) ===
No. overall	No. in season	Title	Directed by	Written by	Original release date	Ref.
118	1	"Target for Three"	Robert Stevens	David Davidson	October 1, 1959	
119	2	"The Sounds of Eden"	Buzz Kulik	George Bellak	October 15, 1959	
120	3	"Misalliance"	Robert Stevens	Meade Roberts	October 29, 1959	
121	4	"The Hidden Image"	Unknown	David Karp	November 12, 1959	
122	5	"The Grey Nurse Said Nothing"	Ron Winston	Sumner Locke Elliott	26 November 1959	
123	6	"The Tunnel"	Delbert Mann	David Shaw	December 10, 1959	
124	7	"The Silver Whistle"	Franklin Schaffner	Robert McEnroe	December 24, 1959	
125	8	"A Dream of Treason"	Robert Stevens	David Davidson	January 21, 1960	
126	9	"To the Sound of Trumpets"	Buzz Kulik	John Gay	February 9, 1960	
127	10	"The Cruel Day"	Franklin Schaffner	Reginald Rose	February 24, 1960	
128	11	"Tomorrow"	Robert Mulligan	Horton Foote	March 7, 1960	
129	12	"The Hiding Place"	Sidney Lumet	Adrian Spies	March 22, 1960	
130	13	"Alas, Babylon"	Robert Stevens	David Shaw	April 3, 1960	
131	14	"Journey to the Day"	John Frankenheimer	Roger O. Hirson	April 22, 1960	
132	15	"The Shape of the River"	Boris Sagal	Horton Foote	May 2, 1960	
133	16	"In the Presence of Mine Enemies"	Fielder Cook	Rod Serling	May 18, 1960	
