= Sincerely, Willis Wayde =

- Playhouse 90 episode
- Episode no.: Season 1 Episode 11
- Directed by: Vincent J. Donehue
- Written by: Frank Gilroy (TV adaptation), John P. Marquand (novel)
- Original air date: December 13, 1956

Guest appearances
- Peter Lawford as Willis Wayde; Charles Bickford as Henry Harcourt; Sarah Churchill as Bess Harcourt; Jeff Donnell as Sylvia; Jane Darwell as Mrs. Jacoby; Walter Abel as Mr. Wayde

Episode chronology
← Previous "Made in Heaven"	Next → "The Family Nobody Wanted"

"Sincerely, Willis Wayde" is an American television play broadcast on December 13, 1956, as part of the CBS television series, Playhouse 90. It is the eleventh episode of the first season of Playhouse 90.

== Plot ==
An ambitious and ruthless young man utilizes duplicity to climb from poverty to wealth and power. Wayde becomes the protege of a mill operator, Henry Harcourt, and courts his daughter, Bess Harcourt.

== Cast ==
- Peter Lawford as Willis Wayde
- Charles Bickford as Henry Harcourt
- Sarah Churchill as Bess Harcourt
- Jeff Donnell as Sylvia
- Jane Darwell as Mrs. Jacoby
- Walter Abel as Mr. Wayde

== Production ==
John P. Marquand's novel, Sincerely, Willis Wade, chronicling the rise of its ambitious and ruthless protagonist from boyhood to the presidency of a great industrial corporation, was released in early 1955.

CBS acquired the television rights to Marquand's novel in June 1956. Frank D. Gilroy was hired to adapt the story for television, and Martin Manulis was the producer. Vincent J. Donehue was the director.

Manulis tried to sign Van Heflin for the title role, but Peter Lawford ultimately cast in the role. Sarah Churchill, the daughter of Winston Churchill, played the role Bess Harcourt. Rudy Vallee had been signed to play the part of Roger Harcourt, but he withdrew in the days prior to the broadcast.

The program was first broadcast on the CBS television series Playhouse 90 from 9:30 p.m. to 11:00 p.m. on Thursday, December 13, 1956.

== Reception ==
In The New York Times, J.P. Shanley called it "gratifying television" and "a drama of unusual substance". The Times also praised Donehue's intelligent direction and the performances of Lawford, Churchill, and Bickford.

In The Boston Globe, Mary Cremmen wrote that Lawford "decidedly arrived" as he "commanded the role of the clever, conniving son of a millhand."

Another critic praised the expressiveness of "Lawford's eyes -- the viewer could read joy, hate and coolness in them."
