= Topaze (Playhouse 90) =

- Playhouse 90 episode
- Sheree North and Ernie Kovacs in "Topaze"
- Episode no.: Season 2 Episode 3
- Directed by: Vincent J. Donehue
- Written by: Ellis St. Joseph (adaptation), Marcel Pagnol (play)
- Original air date: September 26, 1957

Guest appearances
- Ernie Kovacs as Topaze; Carl Reiner as Regis

Episode chronology
← Previous "The Dark Side of the Earth"	Next → "A Sound of Different Drummers"

"Topaze" was an American television play broadcast on September 26, 1957, as part of the second season of the CBS television series Playhouse 90. Ellis St. Joseph wrote the teleplay based on Marcel Pagnol's 1928 play, Topaze. Vincent J. Donehue directed, Martin Manulis was the producer, and Robert Drasnin composed the music. Sterling Hayden was the host, and Ernie Kovacs and Carl Reiner starred.

The program's commercial sponsors were the American Gas Association, Theradan anti-dandruff shampoo, Marlboro cigarettes, and Ipana toothpaste.

== Plot ==
Topaze, an idealistic teacher in a small French school, is fired for refusing to adjust the grades of the son of an influential and corrupt politician. The politician then hires Topaze as the head of a dummy corporation, serving as bagman and money launderer. After realizing that he has been taken advantage of, Topaze embraces the corruption to achieve his own fortune.

== Cast ==
The following performers received screen credit for their performances:

- Ernie Kovacs - Topaze
- Carl Reiner - Regis
- Richard Haydn - Muche
- Sheree North - Suzy
- Stephen Wooton - Young Castel-Benac
- Roxanne Arlen - Germaine
- Moira Turner - Ernestine
- William Roerick - the Count
