= Rendezvous in Black =

- Playhouse 90 episode
- Laraine Day, Boris Karloff and Franchot Tone in "Rendezvous in Black"
- Episode no.: Season 1 Episode 4
- Directed by: John Frankenheimer
- Written by: James P. Cavanagh (teleplay), Cornell Woolrich (novel)
- Original air date: October 25, 1956

Guest appearances
- Franchot Tone as Johnny Marr; Laraine Day as Florence Strickland; Boris Karloff as Ward Allen

Episode chronology
← Previous "Sizeman and Son"	Next → "The Country Husband"

"Rendezvous in Black" was an American television play broadcast live on October 18, 1956, as part of the CBS television series, Playhouse 90.

== Plot ==
Johnny Marr's fiancee is killed by a whisky bottle thrown from an airplane. Marr seeks revenge by killing the loved ones of the passengers on the flight.

== Cast ==
- Franchot Tone as Johnny Marr
- Laraine Day as Florence Strickland
- Boris Karloff as Ward Allen
- Tom Drake as Johnny Mark
- Viveca Lindfors as Johnny Mark
- Elizabeth Patterson as Mrs. Middleton

Additionally, Frank Lovejoy hosted the program.

== Production ==
Martin Manulis was the producer and John Frankenheimer the director. It was Frankenheimer's second directing credit on Playhouse 90 following Forbidden Area.

James P. Cavanagh wrote the teleplay based on the novel, Rendezvous in Black (1948), by Cornell Woolrich.

== Reception ==
In The New York Times, Jack Gould wrote that Playhouse 90 had reverted to "grade B movie material."
