= Bomber's Moon (disambiguation) =

Bomber's Moon is a 1943 American wartime propaganda film.

Bomber's Moon may also refer to:

- "Bomber's Moon" (Inspector George Gently), a 2008 television episode
- "Bomber's Moon" (Playhouse 90), a 1958 American television play
- Bomber's Moon, a 1984 album and its title track, by Mike Harding
