= Confession (Playhouse 90) =

- Playhouse 90 episode
- Episode no.: Season 1 Episode 9
- Directed by: Anton M. Leader
- Written by: Devery Freeman
- Cinematography by: Gert Andersen
- Original air date: November 29, 1956

Guest appearances
- Dennis O'Keefe as Ben Birch; June Lockhart as Amy Mathewson; Paul Stewart as Martin Hoeffer

Episode chronology
← Previous "Eloise"	Next → "Made in Heaven"

"Confession" is an American television play broadcast on November 29, 1956, as part of the CBS television series, Playhouse 90. It was the ninth episode of the first season of Playhouse 90.

== Plot ==
A reporter, Ben Birch, is assigned to write about the life a recently deceased civic leader. He ends up uncovering a major public fraud perpetrated by the deceased man and wins the hand of the man's daughter, Amy Mathewson.

== Cast ==
Robert Preston hosted the broadcast, which included the following cast.

- Dennis O'Keefe as Ben Birch
- June Lockhart as Amy Mathewson
- Paul Stewart as Martin Hoeffer
- Romney Brent as Toby Mathewson
- Henry Daniell as Hubbel
- Ivan Triesault as Carl Kersch
- Charles Watts as Emerson Fricke
- John Crawford as Gunman
- Chet Stratton as Bergstrom
- Jason Johnson as Watchman

== Production ==
The film was produced by Screen Gems. It was the second film that Screen Gems made for Playhouse 90 (the first being The Country Husband).

Eva Wolas was the producer and Anton M. Leader the director. Devery Freeman wrote the script. Gert Andersen was the director of photography and Henry Batista the editor.

The film was broadcast on Thursday, November 29, 1956, from 9:30 p.m. to 11 p.m.

== Reception ==
In The New York Times, Richard F. Shepard wrote that it "displayed activity enough to avoid being characterized as a familiar complete bore. But it surely was familiar."
