= The Innocent Sleep (Playhouse 90) =

- Playhouse 90 episodes
- Hope Lange in "The Innocent Sleep"
- Episode nos.: Season 2 Episodes 37
- Directed by: Franklin Schaffner
- Written by: Tad Mosel
- Original air date: June 5, 1958
- Running time: 1:28:15

Guest appearances
- Hope Lange as Alex Winter; John Ericson as Leo West; Buster Keaton as Charles Blackburn

Episode chronology
← Previous "Natchez"	Next → "A Town Has Turned to Dust"

"The Innocent Sleep" is an American television play broadcast live on June 5, 1958, as part of the second season of the CBS television series Playhouse 90. Tad Mosel wrote the teleplay, and Franklin Schaffner directed. Hope Lange, John Ericson, and Buster Keaton starred, and Raymond Burr was the host.

== Plot ==
Alex Winter is the young bride of a wealthy elderly man, Clyde Winter. She marries the elderly man after the breakup of her relationship with Leo West who later returns to woo her. The man's longtime housekeeper, Mrs. Downey, is suspicious of Alex's motives. The play concerns "patterns of guilt among the characters."

== Cast ==
Raymond Burr was the host and Dick Joyce the announcer. The following cast received screen credit for their performances.

- Hope Lange as Alex Winter
- John Ericson as Leo West
- Buster Keaton as Charles Blackburn
- Hope Emerson as Mrs. Downey
- Dennis King as Clyde Winter
- Peg Hillias as Mrs. Mowle

== Production ==
Martin Manulis was the producer, and Franklin Schaffner directed. Tad Mosel wrote the teleplay, a project he had been working on for three years. The production was broadcast on June 5, 1958. It was part of the second season of Playhouse 90, an anthology television series that was voted "the greatest television series of all time" in a 1970 poll of television editors.

The program's commercial sponsors were the American Gas Association, Ipana toothpaste, Allstate insurance, Camel cigarettes, and Kleenex.
