= Galvanized Yankee (Playhouse 90) =

- Playhouse 90 episode
- Martha Vickers and Lloyd Nolan in "Galvanized Yankee"
- Episode no.: Season 2 Episode 13
- Directed by: Paul Wendkos
- Written by: Russell S. Hughes (adaptation), Gordon D. Shirreffs (novel)
- Original air date: December 5, 1957

Guest appearances
- Lloyd Nolan as Capt. Kuyper; James Whitmore as Capt. Miles Shay; Victor Jory as Capt. Hume

Episode chronology
← Previous "Panic Button"	Next → "The Thundering Wave"

"Galvanized Yankee" was an American television movie broadcast on December 9, 1957, as part of the second season of the CBS television series Playhouse 90. Russell S. Hughes wrote the teleplay as an adaptation of Gordon D. Shireff's novel Massacre Creek. Paul Wendkos directed, Winston O'Keefe was the producer, and George Diskant was the director of photography. Lloyd Nolan, James Whitmore, and Victor Jory starred.

== Plot ==
During the American Civil War, the commander of a Northern prisoner of war camp orders the execution of a Confederate soldier. The brother of executed soldier then seeks revenge on the commander.

== Cast ==
- Lloyd Nolan as Capt. Kuyper
- James Whitmore as Capt. Miles Shay
- Victor Jory as Capt. Hume
- Neville Brand as Sgt. Duggan
- Chuck Courtney as Bob Shay
- Martha Vickers
- William Boyette
