= Reunion (Playhouse 90) =

- Playhouse 90 episode
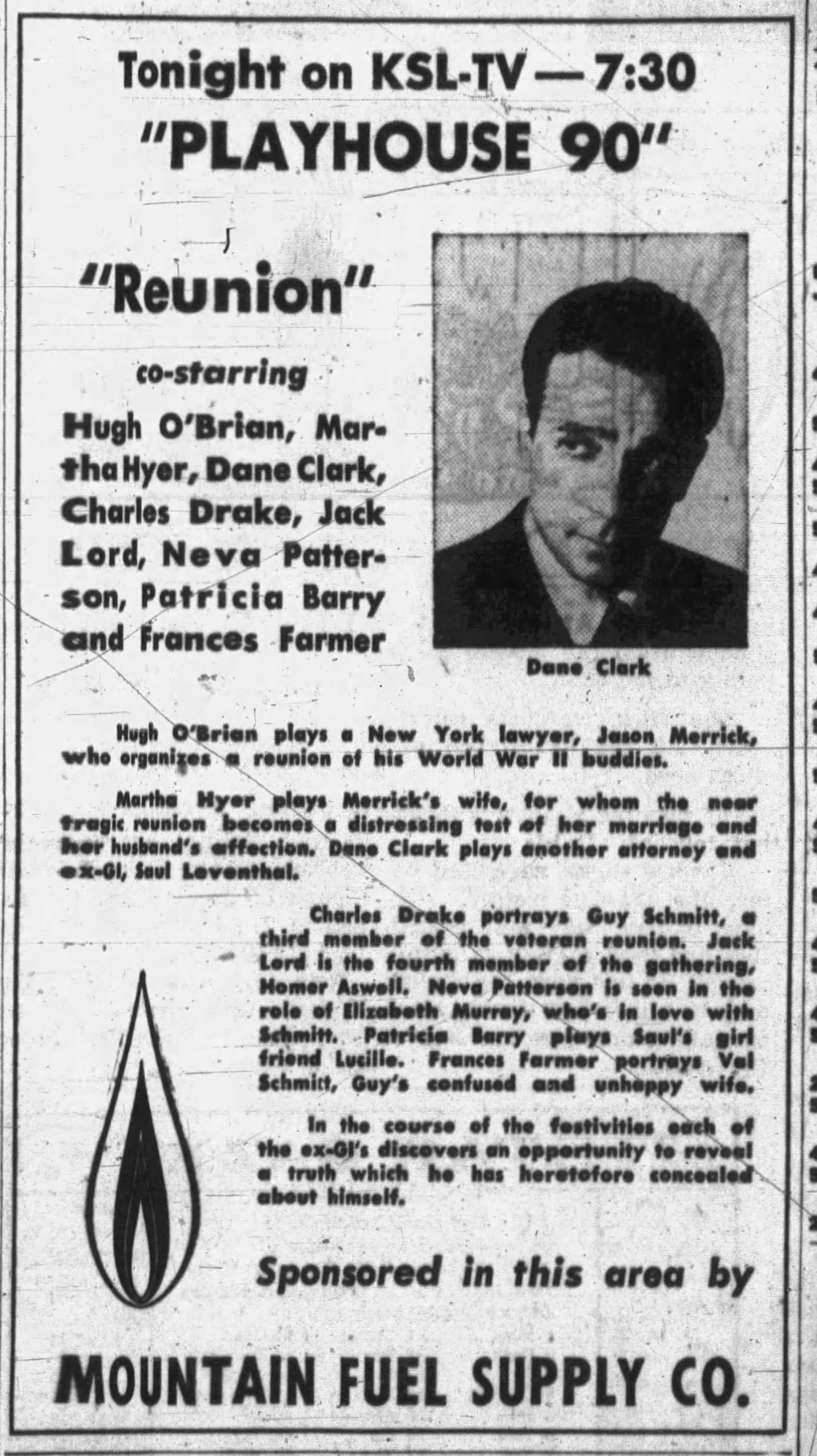
- Episode no.: Season 2 Episode 17
- Directed by: Allan Reisner
- Written by: Merle Miller (teleplay and novel)
- Original air date: January 2, 1958

Guest appearances
- Hugh O'Brian as Jason Merrick; Martha Hyer as Louise Merrick; Dane Clark as Saul Leventhal; Charles Drake as Guy Schmitt

Episode chronology
← Previous "The Lone Woman"	Next → "The Last Man"

"Reunion" was an American television play broadcast live from CBS Television City in Hollywood on January 2, 1958, as part of the second season of the CBS television series Playhouse 90. Merle Miller wrote the teleplay based on his novel of the same name. Allan Reisner directed. Hugh O'Brian, Martha Hyer, Dane Clark, and Charles Drake starred.

== Plot ==
A New York lawyer, James Merrick, organizes a reunion for his World War II comrades. Each tells a life secret. The reunion becomes a test of the relationship between Merrick and his wife.

== Cast ==
The following cast received screen credit for their performances.

- Hugh O'Brian as Jason Merrick
- Martha Hyer as Louise Merrick
- Dane Clark as Saul Leventhal
- Charles Drake as Guy Schmitt
- Jack Lord as Homer Aswell
- Neva Patterson as Elizabeth Murray
- Patricia Barry as Lucille
- Frances Farmer as Val Schmitt
- Robert Paget as Bell Boy
