= The Gentleman from Seventh Avenue =

- Playhouse 90 episode
- Episode no.: Season 2 Episode 21
- Directed by: Allen Reisner
- Written by: Elick Moll
- Cinematography by: Joseph F. Biroc
- Original air date: January 30, 1958

Guest appearances
- Walter Slezak as Mr. Golden; Patricia Neal as Rena Menken; Sylvia Sidney as Mrs. Golden

Episode chronology
← Previous "Before I Die"	Next → "The Violent Heart"

"The Gentleman From Seventh Avenue" was an American television play broadcast on January 30, 1958, as part of the second season of the CBS television series Playhouse 90. Elick Moll wrote the teleplay, Allen Reisner directed, Martin Manulis was the producer, and Albert Heschong was the art director. Walter Slezak, Patricia Neal, and Sylvia Sidney starred.

== Plot ==
A dress manufacturer, Mr. Golden, discovers his attractive designer in tears and takes her to dinner where he learns that she has fallen for the company's playboy salesman. Mr. Golden's paternal actions are misinterpreted by his wife and others.

== Cast ==
- Walter Slezak as Mr. Golden
- Patricia Neal as Rena Menken
- Sylvia Sidney as Mrs. Golden
- Robert Alda as Morris Kogen
- Lawrence Dobkin as Elbaum
- Joyce Jameson as Miss Cooper
- Howard Dayton as Sidney
- Peggy Maley as Shelley
- Judy Nugent as Jenny
- Don Washbrook as Marvin
- Amanda Randolph as Gladys
- Leo Fuchs as Bianco
- Carol Morris as Model, Miss Universe
- Ingrid Goude as Model, Miss Sweden
