= Panic button (disambiguation) =

A panic button is an electronic device designed to assist in alerting somebody (usually the Emergency Services) in emergency situations.

Panic Button may also refer to:

- Panic Button (1964 film), a comedy starring Jayne Mansfield
- Panic Button, a 2007 TV film starring Holly Marie Combs
- Panic Button (2011 film), a British horror thriller
- Panic Button (Playhouse 90), an American television play
- Panic Button Records, an American record label
- Panic Button (company), a video game development studio based in Austin, Texas
- Panic Button, a 2013 program broadcast by TruTV
- PanicButton, a Mozilla Firefox boss key
