= The Dark Side of the Earth =

- Playhouse 90 episode
- Kim Hunter and Van Heflin in "The Dark Side of the Earth"
- Episode no.: Season 2 Episode 2
- Directed by: Arthur Penn
- Written by: Rod Serling
- Original air date: September 19, 1957

Guest appearances
- Van Heflin as Col. Sten; Earl Holliman as Capt. Volodney; Dean Jagger as Anton Rojas; Kim Hunter as Anna Rojas

Episode chronology
| ← Previous "The Death of Manolete" | Next → "Topaze" |

"The Dark Side of the earth" was an American television play broadcast live on September 19, 1957, as part of the CBS television series, Playhouse 90. It was the second episode of the second season. Rod Serling's teleplay told the story of a band of Hungarian freedom fighters captured by the Soviets in 1956.

== Plot ==
The play tells the story of Russia's suppression of the Hungarian Revolution of 1956.

== Cast ==
- Van Heflin as Col. Sten, a Red Army officer charged with suppressing revolution
- Earl Holliman as Capt. Volodney, Sten's uncompromising subordinate
- Dean Jagger as Anton Rojas, a Hungarian communist collaborator
- Kim Hunter as Anna Rojas, wife of the collaborator
- Jerry Paris as Chevak
- Ian Wolfe as General Kerch

== Production ==
Martin Manulis was the producer and Arthur Penn the director. Rod Serling wrote the teleplay. It was the first live television appearance for both Van Heflin and Dean Jagger.

== Reception ==
The television critic in The Philadelphia Inquirer praised the "literate script", the "talented cast", Arthur Penn's restrained direction, and believable if not admirable characters.

Arthur Grace in The Miami News called it "a beautifully written dramatic play" and "a timeless play, appropriate at any time and any place when, in war or revolution, men must slaughter each other." He also praised the superb character development and superb performances of Jagger, Van Heflin, and Hunter.
