= Made in Heaven (Playhouse 90) =

- Playhouse 90 episode
- Episode no.: Season 1 Episode 10
- Directed by: Ralph Nelson
- Written by: Hagar Wilde
- Original air date: December 6, 1956

Episode chronology
← Previous "Confession"	Next → "Sincerely, Willis Wayde"

"Made in Heaven" was an American television play broadcast on December 6, 1956, as part of the CBS television series, Playhouse 90. It is the tenth episode of the first season of Playhouse 90.

== Plot ==
A zany comedy in which a married couple, Zachary and Elsa Meredith, separates due to a series of misunderstandings and begins to date others.

== Cast ==
- Imogene Coca as Elsa Meredith
- Robert Preston as Zachary Meredith
- Phyllis Kirk as Nancy Tennant
- Jacques Bergerac as Laszlo Vertes
- Eddie Mayehoff as Philip Dunlap
- Sheila Bond as June
- Benay Venuta as Marian Hunt
- Mark Roberts as Mr. Tennant
- Benny Baker as Bartender

Additionally, Peter Lawford hosted the broadcast.

== Production ==
Martin Manulis was the producer and Ralph Nelson the director. Hagar Wilde wrote the teleplay, based on her 1946 stage play, Made in Heaven. The production was broadcast live on December 6, 1956.
