= For I Have Loved Strangers =

- Playhouse 90 episode
- Episode no.: Season 2 Episode 15
- Directed by: Franklin Schaffner
- Written by: Elick Moll (adaptation), Don Murray and Fred Clasel (story)
- Original air date: December 19, 1957

Guest appearances
- Don Murray as Bob Munson; Hope Lange as Raiya; Robert Flemyng as Dr. Farlo

Episode chronology
| ← Previous "The Thundering Wave" | Next → "The Lone Woman" |

"For I Have Loved Strangers" was an American television play broadcast on December 19, 1957, as part of the second season of the CBS television series Playhouse 90. Elick Moll wrote the teleplay based on a story by Don Murray and Fred Clasel. Franklin Schaffner directed, Martin Manulis was the producer, and Hedda Hopper hosted. Don Murray and Hope Lange starred. The story was based on Murray's personal experience working with European refugees. Both Murray and Lange donated their salaries from the production to the Homeless European Land Program (HELP) founded by Murray.

== Plot ==
An American is hired to work for a displaced persons camp in Italy. He falls in love with a Czechoslovak refugee, but he is confronted with obstacles when he decide to marry and bring his bride back to the United States.

== Cast ==
The following performers received screen credit for their performances:

- Don Murray as Bob Munson
- Hope Lange as Raiya
- Robert Flemyng as Dr. Farlo
- Vladimir Sokoloff as Bartok
- Werner Klemperer as Boris
