= Sizeman and Son =

- Playhouse 90 episode
- From left, Farley Granger, Eddie Cantor, and Mona Freeman in "Sizeman and Son"
- Episode no.: Season 1 Episode 3
- Directed by: Vincent J. Donahue
- Written by: Elick Moll
- Original air date: October 18, 1956

Guest appearances
- Eddie Cantor as Morris Sizeman; Mona Freeman as Marie Sizeman; Farley Granger as Harold Sizeman; Peter Lorre as Karp

Episode chronology
← Previous "Requiem for a Heavyweight"	Next → "Rendezvous in Black"

"Sizeman and Son" was an American television play broadcast on October 18, 1956, as part of the CBS television series, Playhouse 90.

== Plot ==
Morris Sizeman is a successful garment manufacturer in New York City. His son, Harold Sizeman, returns from the Korean War with new ideas about human rights, believing that the quest for wealth is the cause of the world's difficulties.

== Cast ==
- Eddie Cantor as Morris Sizeman
- Mona Freeman as Marie Sizeman
- Farley Granger as Harold Sizeman
- Peter Lorre as Karp
- Carol Morris as Francine
- Lawrence Dobkin as Rosenzweig
- Dan Blocker as Lewis

== Production ==
In September 1956, CBS announced that it had signed the noted comedian Eddie Cantor to play the lead in "Seidman & Son". Martin Manulis was the producer with Vincent J. Donahue directing. The teleplay was written by Elick Moll.

== Reception ==
In The New York Times, J. P. Shanley called the production "shallow and unsatisfying" and Elick Moll's script "an undistinguished product from the ready-to-wear rack."

In The Pittsburgh Press, Fred Remington rated the program "way above average" and praised Peter Lorre's "wonderfully humorous performances" as an aging worker "who's not having any young whippersnapper telling him he's downtrodden."
