= The Playroom (Playhouse 90) =

- Playhouse 90 episode
- Tony Randall, Mildred Dunnock, and Marilyn Erskine in "The Playroom"
- Episode no.: Season 2 Episode 5
- Directed by: Franklin Schaffner
- Written by: Tad Mosel
- Original air date: October 10, 1957

Guest appearances
- Tony Randall as Kenneth Rutherford; Nina Foch as Mrs. Dorothy Kelly; Patricia Neal as Margaret Flood

Episode chronology
← Previous "A Sound of Different Drummers"	Next → "Around the World in 90 Minutes"

"The Playroom" was an American television play broadcast on October 10, 1957, as part of the second season of the CBS television series Playhouse 90. Tad Mosel wrote the teleplay. Franklin Schaffner directed, Martin Manulis was the producer, Dominick Dunne was the assistant to the producer, and Albert Heschong was the art director. Mike Todd was the host, and Tony Randall, Nina Foch, and Patricia Neal starred.

== Plot ==
Three children, a lawyer, an actress, and the founder of a college, return home when their mother wins a "Mother of the Year" award from a magazine.

== Cast ==
- Tony Randall - Kenneth Rutherford
- Nina Foch - Mrs. Dorothy Kelly
- Patricia Neal - Margaret Flood
- Marilyn Erskine - Katherine Rutherford
- Charles Drake - George Rutherford
- Mildred Dunnock - Mrs. Millie Rutherford
- Nora Marlowe - Mrs. Beal
- Lewis Martin - Toastmaster
- Florida Freibus - Woman Reporter
- Dennis King Jr. - Clerk
- Therese Lyon - Messenger
- Julia Meade
- Robert Ruark
- Doak Walker
