= The Hostess with the Mostes' =

- Playhouse 90 episode
- Episode no.: Season 1 Episode 25
- Directed by: Paul Nickell
- Written by: Speed Lamkin, Hagar Wilde
- Original air date: March 21, 1957

Guest appearances
- Shirley Booth as Perle Mesta; Hedda Hopper as Maizie Weldon

Episode chronology
← Previous "The Last Tycoon"	Next → "Charley's Aunt"

"The Hostess with the Mostes'" is an American television play broadcast live on March 21, 1957, as part of the CBS television series, Playhouse 90. It is the twenty-fifth episode of the first season. Shirley Booth played the part of socialite Perle Mesta.

== Plot ==
The play tells the story of socialite Perle Mesta, who was known for her lavish social parties. She grew up in Oklahoma, married the president of a steel company, and served as the U.S. Ambassador to Luxembourg. She was also the inspiration for Irving Berlin's musical, Call Me Madam.

== Cast ==
Perle Mesta hosted and narrated the broadcast, which included performances by the following cast.

- Shirley Booth as Perle Mesta
- Hedda Hopper as Maizie Weldon
- Perle Mesta as Herself
- Shepperd Strudwick as Charley Potter
- Robert Lowery as George Mesta
- Frank Milan as Philip Caldwell
- Joan Wetmore as Emily Caldwell
- Louise Beavers as Mattie Mae
- Peter Votrian as Mac
- Evelyn Rudie as Young Perle
- Fred Essler as Professor Froelich
- Emily Lawrence as Reverend Mother
- Caren Lenay as Countess Bellefonte
- Carol Veazie as Mrs. Kreeger
- Howard Wendell as Senator Kreeger
- Edgar Barrier as Count Bellefonte
- Lewis Martin as Mr. MacBride
- Peter Brocco as French Chef
- Paul Millard as Mr. Forbes
- James Gavin as Mr. Skirvin
- Werner Klemperer as Mr. Kolosoff
- Helen Hatch as Sister Euprasia
- Mavis Neal as Nurse
- Tony Romano as The Guitarist

== Production ==
Martin Manulis was the producer. Paul Nickell directed. The teleplay was written by Speed Lamkin and Hagar Wilde. Albert Heschong was the art director.

== Reception ==
In The New York Times, Jack Gould called it "a bewildering bouillabaisse of cliche and corn" and proclaimed: "Unreservedly, it was the worstes'."

Jack O'Brian of the International News Service called it "a long, friendly, slow, patient explanation of Perle Mesta, virtually a 90-minute commercial setting the record straight through Mrs. Mesta's rose-colored memory."
