= The Second Man (Playhouse 90) =

- Playhouse 90 episode
- Margaret Leighton and Kenneth Haigh in "The Second Man"
- Episode no.: Season 3 Episode 19
- Written by: Leslie Stevens (adaptation), Edward Grierson (book)
- Original air date: February 12, 1959

Guest appearances
- James Mason as Hesketh; Margaret Leighton as Miss Kerrison

Episode chronology
← Previous "Child of Our Time"	Next → "The Raider"

"The Second Man" was an American television play broadcast live on February 12, 1959, as the 100th episode of the CBS television series, Playhouse 90. The cast was led by James Mason. The teleplay was written by Leslie Stevens as an adaptation of the novel, The Second Man, by Edward Grierson.

== Plot ==
A woman barrister at a prestigious London chambers tries to save a young man accused of murdering his wealthy aunt.

== Cast ==
The cast includes the following.

- James Mason as Hesketh
- Margaret Leighton as Miss Kerrison
- Hugh Griffith as Jaggers
- Diana Wynyard as Jane Birman
- Kenneth Haigh as Maudsley

== Production ==
The program was presented live from Television city in Hollywood on February 19, 1959, on the CBS television series Playhouse 90. The teleplay was written by Leslie Stevens as an adaptation of the novel, The Second Man (1956), by Edward Grierson.

== Reception ==
Television critic William Ewald of the UPI wrote: "The play was the sort of thing I believe Britons refer to as jolly good theater. It is dead-end theater -- predictable, fully charted, bounded by convention -- but even so, it is a joy to watch when it's parceled attractively. . . . The players bit into this chunk with enormous relish and I must say I enjoyed every minute of it."
