= Massacre at Sand Creek =

- Playhouse 90 episode
- Episode no.: Season 1 Episode 13
- Directed by: Arthur Hiller
- Written by: William Sackheim
- Cinematography by: Ray Cory
- Original air date: December 27, 1956

Guest appearances
- Everett Sloane as Col. John Templeton; John Derek at Lt. Norman Tucker; Gene Evans as Sgt. Maddox

Episode chronology
← Previous "The Family Nobody Wanted"	Next → "Snowshoes: A Comedy of People and Horses"

"Massacre at Sand Creek" is an American television film broadcast on December 27, 1956, as part of the CBS television series, Playhouse 90. It is the thirteenth episode of the first season.

== Plot ==
The film tells the story of the Sand Creek massacre, an 1864 massacre of Cheyenne and Arapaho people by the U.S. Army during the American Indian Wars.

== Cast ==
- Everett Sloane as Col. John Templeton
- John Derek at 2nd Lt. Norman Tucker
- Gene Evans as 1st Sgt. Maddox
- Roy Roberts as Col. Collery
- Ken Mayer as Major Downing
- William Schallert as Defense Attorney
- Haim Winant as Free Horse
- Marshall Bradford as Presiding Officer
- Rick Vallin as Henshaw
- Ben Wright as Prosecuting Attorney
- Michael Granger as Little River
- Anthony Lawrence as Reed
- William Bryant as Calhoun

== Production ==
Arthur Hiller was the director in his first production for Playhouse 90. William Sackheim was the producer and also wrote the teleplay. Ray Cory was the director of photography, and Henry Batista was the editor. The film was produced by Screen Gems for Playhouse 90. It was the third Playhouse 90 film produced by Screen Gems.

Steve Drumm, a Blackfoot Indian, served as the makeup and hair expert for the actors playing the parts of the Indians. He was in charge of ensuring the use of authentic haircuts, applying war paint, and overseeing scalpings.

The production used approximately 75 horses. Actor John Derek emphasized the importance of the horses: "Any western star is only as good as his horse. Put a dashing hero on a drooping, plodding horse and even the most cityfied youngster would pelt the television screen . . . A spirited, prancing hunk of horseflesh is as necessary as the camera."

== Reception ==
Donald Kirkley in The Baltimore Sun criticized the film for its historical "changes and inventions." In addition to changing the villain's name from John Chivington to Templeton, Kirkley noted that the production radically altered the details of the massacre as well as the motive. The real Chivington, wrote Kirkley, was a former minister motivated by a fervent belief that Indians "were no better than wild beasts, to be exterminated when found." The script changed the fictional Templeton's motive to one of personal ambition.

FilmInk wrote "Derek plays a decent lieutenant who winds up blamed for the whole thing; once more, he’s effective as a weak and passive person."
