= The Fabulous Irishman =

- Playhouse 90 episode
- Katharine Bard and Art Carney from "The Fabulous Irishman"
- Episode no.: Season 1 Episode 39
- Directed by: John Frankenheimer
- Written by: Elick Moll
- Original air date: June 27, 1957

Guest appearance
- Art Carney as Robert Briscoe

Episode chronology
← Previous "Ain't No Time Glory"	Next → "The Death of Manolete"

"The Fabulous Irishman" is an American television play broadcast live on June 27, 1957, as part of the CBS television series, Playhouse 90. It is the thirty-ninth episode of the first season.

== Plot ==
The play begins in 1918 when Robert Briscoe, a young Orthodox Jew living in Dublin under British-rule, defies his father's wishes and joins the IRA during the Irish War of Independence. He smuggles arms past the Black and Tans and becomes the subject of a "shoot on sight" order.

== Cast ==
- Art Carney as Robert Briscoe
- Katharine Bard as Lillian Isaacs
- Michael Higgins as Jamie Farrow
- Charles Davis as Sean O'Brien
- Eli Mintz as Mr. Isaacs
- George Mathews as Mellows
- David Opatoshu as Briscoe's Father
- Berta Gersten
- Peter Lorre

Additionally, Eddie Cantor hosted the broadcast.

== Production ==
Martin Manulis was the producer and John Frankenheimer the director. Elick Moll wrote the teleplay. The play was presented live on June 27, 1957.

== Reception ==
In The New York Times, J. P. Shanley called it "a splendid tribute to a colorful patriot" and "a most creditable conclusion" to Playhouse 90's first season. Shanley wrote that Carney was "ideal" for the title role and that Carney has proven himself "a versatile and brilliant actor."

In The Boston Globe, Elizabeth W. Driscoll called it "one of the most heartwarming offerings of the season and "a story that had all the authenticity and much of the impact of 'The Informer' without its great tragedy." She praised the absence of "sanctimonious little speeches" and wrote that Carney gave a performance that "helps convince you television is a wonderful thing."
