= The 80 Yard Run =

- Playhouse 90 episode
- Paul Newman in "The 80 Yard Run"
- Episode no.: Season 2 Episode 19
- Directed by: Franklin Schaffner
- Written by: David Shaw
- Based on: story by Irwin Shaw
- Original air date: January 16, 1958

Guest appearances
- Paul Newman as Christian Darling; Joanne Woodward as Louise Darling

Episode chronology
← Previous "The Last Man"	Next → "Before I Die"

"The 80 Yard Run" is an American television play broadcast on January 16, 1958, as part of the second season of the CBS television series Playhouse 90. Paul Newman and Joanne Woodward co-starred. Franklin Schaffner directed, and David Shaw wrote the teleplay as an adaptation of a story written by his brother Irwin Shaw.

== Plot ==
A college freshman, Christian Darling, runs 80 yards for a touchdown to establish himself as a star. His girlfriend, Louise, is a rich and beautiful girl. The two marry, but Christian's football career falters after an injury. Louise's career working at a magazine is very successful. Christian is frustrated by his inability to support Louise, and the marriage fails.

== Cast ==
The following cast received screen credit for their performances.

- Paul Newman as Christian Darling
- Joanne Woodward as Louise Darling
- Darryl Hickman as Herbie
- Robert F. Simon as Sam
- Richard Anderson as Pete
- Red Sanders as Coach (UCLA football coach)

== Production ==
David Shaw wrote the teleplay, as an adaptation of a story by his brother, Irwin Shaw. The story originally appeared in the May 1955 issue of Playboy magazine. Franklin Schaffner directed. Paul Newman and Joanne Woodward starred.

Prior to the broadcast, Woodward expressed concern about the production: "We agreed to do it because Paul loved the story so much. But I think they have stretched it too much, padded it."

On January 29, 1958, 13 days after their appearance in The 80 Yard Run, Newman and Woodward were married by a judge in a bungalow at the El Rancho Hotel and Casino in Las Vegas. They also appeared on screen later in the year in the film The Long, Hot Summer.

UCLA football head coach Red Sanders made his acting debut in the production. He played the part of a college football coach.

== Reception ==
In The New York Times, John P. Shanley praised that the "sensitive and effective" performances of Newman and Woodward, and opined that the "expert direction" of Franklin Schaffner, "gave distinction to what might otherwise have been a routine presentation."

United Press television critic William Ewald rated it as the best offering from Playhouse 90's second season. He was especially effusive in his praise of Newman and Woodward: "I don't think it would be possible to heap too much praise upon Paul Newman and Joanne Woodward . . . Newman and Miss Woodward turned out a team performance that spoke of deep respect for each other's craft, a meshing together that indicated understanding of their parts and, I imagine, lots or rehearsal sweat."

A review in the Los Angeles Times called it a "remarkable story" with the "ingredients of a great show."
