= The Raider =

- Playhouse 90 episode
- Episode no.: Season 3 Episode 20
- Directed by: Franklin Schaffner
- Written by: Loring Mandel
- Original air date: February 19, 1959
- Running time: 1:30

Guest appearances
- Frank Lovejoy as Arthur Hennicut; Donald Crisp as Samuel Harman; Rod Taylor as Robert Castillo

Episode chronology
← Previous "The Second Man"	Next → "The Dingaling Girl"

"The Raider" was an American television play broadcast on February 19, 1959 as part of the CBS television series, Playhouse 90. The cast included Frank Lovejoy, Donald Crisp, and Rod Taylor. Franklin Schaffner was the director and Loring Mandel the writer.

== Plot ==
The Harman Corp. is the subject of a takeover attempt by a corporate raider.

== Cast ==
The cast includes the following.

- Frank Lovejoy as Arthur Hennicut
- Donald Crisp as Samuel Harman
- Leif Erickson as James Mayberry
- Rod Taylor as Robert Castillo
- Leon Ames as Leland Wolff
- Louis Jean Heydt as Marvin Tannis
- Carl Benton Reid as Mr. Church
- Paul Douglas as David Ringler
- George Mitchell as Corey Palmer
- Jennifer Howard as Rona Ringler
- Raymond Bailey as Mr. Stern
- Douglas Evans as Mr. Lassiter
- John Conwell as Mr. Leech
- Jean Inness as Mrs. Hurst
- Louise Vincent as Receptionist
- Ella Ethridge as Mrs. Harman
- James McCallon as Mr. Juster
- Helen Kleeb as Mrs. Juster

== Production ==
The program aired on February 19, 1959, on the CBS television series Playhouse 90. Loring Mandel was the writer and Franklin Schaffner the director.
