= Free Weekend =

- Playhouse 90 episode
- Nina Foch and Charles Bickford in "Free Weekend"
- Episode no.: Season 3 Episode 10
- Directed by: Fielder Cook
- Written by: Steven Gethers
- Original air date: December 4, 1958
- Running time: 1:19:15

Guest appearances
- Charles Bickford as Marvin; Jim Backus as Jerry; Buddy Ebsen as Phil; James Whitmore as Guy Cato

Episode chronology
← Previous "The Return of Ansel Gibbs"	Next → "Seven Against the Wall"

"Free Weekend" was an American television play broadcast on December 4, 1958, as part of the CBS television series, Playhouse 90.

== Plot ==
During "parents' weekend" at Camp Mojave, parents maneuver to aid their children in winning the camp's awards.

== Cast ==
The cast includes the following.

- Charles Bickford as Marvin
- Jim Backus as Jerry
- Buddy Ebsen as Phil
- Ned Glass as Lester Green
- Henny Backus as Mrs. Green
- James Whitmore as Guy Cato
- Kim Hunter as Shirley Cato
- Nina Foch as Wanda Newton
- Jack Albertson as Herbert Sands
- Nancy Marchand as Sylvia Sands
- Paul Langton as Paul Newton
- Lee Kinsolving as Richard Cato
- June Dayton as Dorothy Gordon
- Michael Landon as Victor Gordon
- Dee Pollock as Larry Newton
- Peter Votrian as Neil Sands

== Production ==
The program aired on December 4, 1958, on the CBS television series Playhouse 90. It was written by Steven Gethers. John Houseman was the producer and Fielder Cook the director.
