= Made in Japan (Playhouse 90) =

- Playhouse 90 episode
- Episode no.: Season 3 Episode 22
- Directed by: Herbert Hirschman
- Written by: Leslie Stevens
- Original air date: March 5, 1959
- Running time: 1:30

Guest appearances
- Harry Guardino as Lt. Michael Largo; E.G. Marshall as Capt. Jules Kilby; Dean Stockwell as Roy Riverlee

Episode chronology
← Previous "The Dingaling Girl"	Next → "For Whom the Bell Tolls"

"Made in Japan" was an American television play broadcast on March 5, 1959, as part of the CBS television series, Playhouse 90. The cast included Harry Guardino, E.G. Marshall, and Dean Stockwell. Herbert Hirschman was the director and Leslie Stevens was the writer.

== Plot ==
An American soldier in postwar Japan has an affair with a Japanese woman. When he decides to break it off, she reveals that she had called off her engagement to a Japanese man and expects him to do the same with his American fiancée.

== Cast ==
The cast includes the following.

- Harry Guardino as Lt. Michael Largo
- E. G. Marshall as Capt. Jules Kilby
- Dean Stockwell as Roy Riverlee
- Robert Vaughn as Earl Randolph
- Nobu McCarthy as Song Mayonaka
- George Takei as Kenji-Kimura

== Production ==
The program aired on March 5, 1959, on the CBS television series Playhouse 90. Leslie Stevens was the writer and Herbert Hirschman the director.
