= The Return of Ansel Gibbs (Playhouse 90) =

- Playhouse 90 episode
- Melvyn Douglas in "The Return of Ansel Gibbs"
- Episode no.: Season 3 Episode 9
- Directed by: Ralph Nelson
- Written by: David Davidson (adaptation), Frederick Buechner (novel)
- Original air date: November 27, 1958
- Running time: 1:27:59

Guest appearances
- Melvyn Douglas as Ansel Gibbs; Diana Lynn as Anne; Mary Astor as Sylvia

Episode chronology
← Previous "Old Man"	Next → "Free Weekend"

"The Return of Ansel Gibbs" was an American television play broadcast on November 27, 1958, as part of the CBS television series, Playhouse 90.

== Plot ==
A retired diplomat, Ansel Gibbs, accepts a position in Washington, D.C., as "Special Assistant to the President for Disarmament". He is invited onto a television show where the host seeks to humiliate him. Gibbs contemplates withdrawing from the nomination but elects to proceed to the Senate confirmation hearing and is approved.

== Cast ==
The cast includes the following.

- Melvyn Douglas as Ansel Gibbs
- Diana Lynn as Anne
- Mary Astor as Sylvia
- Earl Holliman as Robin Tripp
- Loring Smith as Sen. Farwell
- Ilka Chase as Louise
- John Hoyt as Porter Hoye

== Production ==
The program aired on November 27, 1958, on the CBS television series Playhouse 90. It was written by David Davidson based on Frederick Buechner's 1958 novel. John Houseman was the producer and Ralph Nelson the director.

== Reception ==
John P. Shanley in The New York Times found the production to be melodramatic, artificial, and unsatisfactory.
