= The Blackwell Story =

- Playhouse 90 episode
- Joanne Dru in "The Blackwell Story"
- Episode no.: Season 1 Episode 22
- Directed by: James Neilson
- Written by: Mel Barr, Lloyd C. Douglas
- Cinematography by: Gert Andersen
- Original air date: February 28, 1957

Guest appearances
- Joanne Dru as Elizabeth Blackwell; Dan O'Herlihy as Dr. Keller; Charles Korvin as Dr. Von Neff

Episode chronology
← Previous "One Coat of White"	Next → "Invitation to a Gunfighter"

"The Blackwell Story" is an American television film broadcast live on February 28, 1957, as part of the CBS television series, Playhouse 90. It is the twenty-second episode of the first season of Playhouse 90. Joanne Dru played the role of Elizabeth Blackwell.

== Plot ==
The play examines the life of Elizabeth Blackwell who became America's first woman doctor in 1849.

== Cast ==
- Joanne Dru as Elizabeth Blackwell
- Dan O'Herlihy as Dr. Keller
- Charles Korvin as Dr. Von Neff
- Marshall Thompson as David
- Keith Larsen as Howard
- Wilton Graff as Samuel Blackwell
- Philip Tonge as Dean Parkington
- Paul Keast as Dean Robertson
- Damian O'Flynn as Dr. McKay
- Joanna Barnes as Ellen Blackwell
- Harvey Stephens as Dr. Adams

Additionally, Frank Lovejoy hosted the show.

== Production ==
The film was produced by Screen Gems for Playhouse 90. It was Screen Gems' fifth production for the series.

Eva Wolas was the producer, and James Neilson was the director. Mel Barr wrote the teleplay based on an unproduced script ("The First Woman Doctor") by Lloyd C. Douglas. Gert Andersen was the director of photography.

== Reception ==
Walter Ames in the Los Angeles Times called it a "TV triumph" and praised Dru's "sterling performance".

In the New York Daily News, Ben Gross called it an "interesting play" and praised Dru for "an appealing and forceful portrayal."
