= Before I Die (Playhouse 90) =

- Playhouse 90 episode
- Jay C. Flippen and Coleen Gray from "Before I Die"
- Episode no.: Season 2 Episode 20
- Directed by: Arthur Hiller
- Written by: Berne Giler
- Cinematography by: Gert Andersen
- Original air date: January 23, 1958

Guest appearances
- Richard Kiley as Dr. David Del Vecchio; Kim Hunter as Joyce McClure

Episode chronology
← Previous "The 80 Yard Run"	Next → "The Gentleman From Seventh Avenue"

"Before I Die" was an American television film broadcast on January 23, 1958, as part of the CBS television series, Playhouse 90. It aired as the twentieth episode of the second season.

== Plot ==
A surgeon becomes convinced of the innocence of a convicted murderer based on the convict mumbling while under anesthesia. He risks his reputation to save the convict from the electric chair.

== Cast ==
- Richard Kiley as Dr. David Del Vecchio
- Kim Hunter as Joyce McClure
- Skip Homeier as George Weaver
- Coleen Gray as Carol Dennison
- Jay C. Flippen as Lester Carr
- Joe De Santis as Dr. Max Bronstein
- John Hoyt as Dr. Gordon Harper
- Dayton Lummis as Dr. Engle
- Fred Eisley as Anesthetist

== Production ==
Arthur Hiller was the director and William Froug the producer. Berne Giler wrote the script based on a story by William Sackheim and Daniel B. Ullman. Gert Andersen was the director of photography and Richard Brockway the editor. The film was produced by Screen Gems for Playhouse 90.
