= The Troublemakers (Playhouse 90) =

- Playhouse 90 episodes
- Barbara Rush and Ben Gazzara in "The Troublemakers"
- Episode nos.: Season 2 Episodes 11
- Directed by: John Frankenheimer
- Written by: George Bellak (adaptation)
- Original air date: November 21, 1957

Guest appearances
- Ben Gazzara as Stanley Carr; Barbara Rush as Clara Gerrity; Keenan Wynn as Mr. Sprock

Episode chronology
← Previous "Jet Propelled Couch"	Next → "Panic Button"

"The Troublemakers" was an American television play broadcast on November 21, 1957, as part of the second season of the CBS television series Playhouse 90. John Frankenheimer directed. Ben Gazzara, Barbara Rush, and Keenan Wynn starred.

== Plot ==
A group of university students beat and kill an outspoken journalist for the school newspaper. One of the students struggles with his conscience over his vow to remain silent about the event.

== Cast ==
The following cast received screen credit for their performances.

- Ben Gazzara as Stanley Carr
- Barbara Rush as Clara Gerrity
- Keenan Wynn as Mr. Sprock
- Mary Astor as Mattie Gerrity
- Jackie Coogan as Sgt. Bender
- Harry Guardino as Ralph Como
- Nick Adams as Sandy Remington
- Robert Vaughn as Steve Sprock
- Jack Mullaney as Torin Gerrity
- Malcolm Atterbury as Otis Gerrity

== Production ==
John Frankenheimer was the director and Martin Manulis the producer. George Bellak wrote the teleplay. It was originally broadcast on November 21, 1957. It was part of the second season of Playhouse 90, an anthology television series that was voted "the greatest television series of all time" in a 1970 poll of television editors.
