= The Family Nobody Wanted =

1954 book by Helen Doss

- First edition
- Author: Helen Doss
- Language: English
- Publisher: Little, Brown
- Publication date: 1954
- Publication place: United States
- Pages: 267

The Family Nobody Wanted is a 1954 memoir by Helen Doss (née Grigsby). It retells the story of how Doss and her husband Carl, a Methodist minister, adopted twelve children of various ethnic backgrounds (White Americans, Chinese, Japanese, Filipino, Korean, Mexican, and Native American).

== Summary ==
"I didn't yearn for a career or maids and a fur coat or a trip to Europe. All in the world I wanted was a happy, normal little family. Perhaps, if God could arrange it, Carl and I could have a boy first and after that, a little girl. God didn't arrange it."

Thus opens the story of the Doss family. After Helen and Carl are told they cannot have biological children, Carl suggests adopting an infant. After some initial obstacles, they adopt a six-week-old, blonde, blue-eyed baby boy, who actually looks like Carl. After Donny joins the family, they try to adopt another child, hoping for a little girl this time. They face a lot of resistance from the agencies due to their financial situation as well as the fact that they already have a child. They pursue private adoption for a time, but after failure, they return to the agencies.

A social worker makes a stray comment about a Turkish-Portuguese baby that they cannot place, saying "That's what happens with those mixed-blood children...Nobody wants them. They are classed as unadoptable, same as any child with a defect." Helen and Carl are shocked and horrified that anyone would reject a child and offer to adopt him. The agency refuses to place the child with them, claiming that they "would rather see a child raised in an orphanage, than by parents who look so different." Helen and Carl realize that other agencies may not feel the same way and decide to pursue adoption of "unadoptable children."

Finally, they are contacted about a two-month-old baby girl. The birth parents are Filipino-Chinese and English-French. Helen names her Laura after Carl's mother. Two weeks later they adopt Susie, who is blond with blue eyes, but considered unadoptable because she is frail/sickly and has a birth mark on her face.

When Donny gets older, he wants a brother "just his size." Many of the subsequent adoptions occur as a by-product of trying to find Donny's missing brother. The Dosses adopt a total of 12 children. In their final adoption, when Donny is 9, they gain baby Gregory, 9-year-old Dorothy, and Richard, age 9, Donny's long awaited brother. Through the years, they deal with racism and prejudice from neighbors, family members, and the children's classmates.

== The children ==
- Donny – one of the "triplets"; first adopted
- Laura – one of the "quads"; second adopted, two weeks before Susie
- Susie – one of the "quads"; third adopted, two weeks after Laura
- Teddy – one of the "quads"; fourth adopted
- Rita – one of the "twins"; fifth adopted
- Timmy – sixth adopted
- Alex – seventh adopted
- Elaine – one of the "quads"; eighth adopted
- Diane – one of the "twins"; ninth adopted
- Richard – one of the "triplets"; tenth adopted, the brother the size of Donny
- Dorothy – one of the "triplets"; eleventh adopted
- Gregory – twelfth adopted

== In popular culture ==
The couple appeared on a 1954 episode of You Bet Your Life with Groucho Marx, where they talked about their story.

The story was also featured in "The Family Nobody Wanted", a 1956 episode of Playhouse 90 directed by a young John Frankenheimer and made into a 1975 ABC Movie of the Week starring Shirley Jones of The Partridge Family fame.
