= The Violent Heart (Playhouse 90) =

- Playhouse 90 episodes
- Dana Wynter and Ben Gazzara in "The Violent Heart"
- Episode nos.: Season 2 Episodes 22
- Directed by: John Frankenheimer
- Written by: Leslie Stevens (adaptation), Daphne du Maurier (short story)
- Original air date: February 6, 1958

Guest appearances
- Dana Wynter as Catherine D'Alencon; Ben Gazzara as Paul; Charles Korvin as Edouard D'Alencon

Episode chronology
← Previous "The Gentleman From Seventh Avenue"	Next → "No Time at All"

"The Violent Heart" is an American television play broadcast on February 6, 1958, as part of the second season of the CBS television series Playhouse 90. John Frankenheimer directed. Dana Wynter and Ben Gazzara starred.

== Plot ==
Set on the Riviera, a young marquise buys a camera from a photographer. She returns to the studio to visit the photographer.

== Cast ==
The following cast received screen credit for their performances.

- Dana Wynter as Catherin D'Alencon
- Ben Gazzara as Paul
- Charles Korvin as Edouard D'Alencon
- Pamela Brown as Baronesse von Heinrich
- Vivian Nathan as Annette
- William Roerick as the Hotel Manager
- Mimi Gibson as Celeste D'Alencon

== Production ==
John Frankenheimer was the director and Martin Manulis the producer. It was originally broadcast on February 6, 1958. It was part of the second season of Playhouse 90, an anthology television series that was voted "the greatest television series of all time" in a 1970 poll of television editors.

The commercial sponsors were Kimberly-Clark (Delsey bathroom tissue and Kleenex tissues), Marlboro cigarettes, Bristol-Myers (Ban deodorant, Bufferin pain reliever, Vitalis hair tonic, and Ipan toothpaste), and the American Gas Association.
