= A Sound of Different Drummers =

- Playhouse 90 episode
- Diana Lynn and Sterling Hayden in "A Sound of Different Drummers"
- Episode no.: Season 2 Episode 4
- Directed by: John Frankenheimer
- Written by: Robert Alan Aurthur
- Original air date: October 3, 1957

Guest appearances
- Sterling Hayden as Gordon Miller; Diana Lynn as Susan Ward; John Ireland as Ben Hammond; David Opatoshu as Ellis

Episode chronology
| ← Previous "Topaze" | Next → "The Playroom" |

"A Sound of Different Drummers" was an American television play broadcast live on October 3, 1957, as part of the CBS television series, Playhouse 90. It was the fourth episode of the second season. John Frankenheimer directed, and Sterling Hayden starred.

== Plot ==
A young security police officer in a future totalitarian state is assigned to suppress illegal intellectual activity, including executing book readers. He catches a librarian hiding a banned book and joins her in reading books.

== Cast ==
- Sterling Hayden as Gordon Miller, the young security police officer
- Diana Lynn as Susan Ward, the idealist librarian
- John Ireland as Ben Hammond, a satisfied conformist
- David Opatoshu as Ellis, the chief trial judge and secret reader

Additionally, Tony Randall hosted the broadcast.

== Production ==
Martin Manulis was the producer and John Frankenheimer the director. The teleplay was written by Robert Alan Aurthur.

== Reception ==
In The New York Times, Jack Gould called it "the boldest and most stimulating" play of the season, an "intellectually compelling narrative", and "a powerful drama protesting the disease of conformity." He also praised the futuristic settings and sensitive direction of John Frankenheimer.
