= A Quiet Game of Cards =

- Playhouse 90 episode
- Gary Merrill and Barry Sullivan in A Quiet Game of Cards
- Episode no.: Season 3 Episode 17
- Directed by: Alex Segal
- Written by: Reginald Rose
- Original air date: January 29, 1959

Guest appearances
- Barry Sullivan as Sturbridge; Franchot Tone as Raymondd; Gary Merrill as McBurnie

Episode chronology
← Previous "The Velvet Alley"	Next → "Child of Our Time"

"A Quiet Game of Cards" was an American television play broadcast on January 29, 1959 as part of the CBS television series, Playhouse 90. The cast included Barry Sullivan and Franchot Tone.

== Plot ==
A group of wealthy, bored poker buddies decide to commit murder.

== Cast ==
The cast includes the following.

- Barry Sullivan as Sturbridge
- Franchot Tone as Raymondd
- Gary Merrill as McBurnie
- E. G. Marshall as Merrill
- William Bendix as Wales
- Irene Hervey as Mrs. McBurnie

== Production ==
The program aired on January 29, 1959, on the CBS television series Playhouse 90. Reginald Rose was the writer and Alex Segal the director.
