= The Family Nobody Wanted (Playhouse 90) =

- Playhouse 90 episode
- Nanette Fabray, Lew Ayres, and Tim Hovey
- Episode no.: Season 1 Episode 12
- Directed by: John Frankenheimer
- Written by: George Bruce (teleplay), Helen Doss (memoir)
- Original air date: December 20, 1956

Guest appearances
- Nanette Fabray as Helen Doss; Lew Ayres as Carl Doss; Tim Hovey as Donny

Episode chronology
← Previous "Sincerely, Willis Wayde"	Next → "Massacre at Sand Creek"

"The Family Nobody Wanted" is an American television play broadcast on December 20, 1956, as part of the CBS television series, Playhouse 90. It is the twelfth episode of the first season of Playhouse 90.

== Plot ==
The teleplay is based on a true story about a divinity student, Carl Doss, and his wife, Helen Doss, of Redlands, California, who adopt 12 children of various ancestries.

== Cast ==
Dale Evans hosted the broadcast, which featured:

- Nanette Fabray as Helen Doss
- Lew Ayres as Carl Doss
- Tim Hovey as Donny
- Cherylene Lee as Asian Child
- Dick Kay Hong as Timmy, Adopted Kid

== Production ==
Martin Manulis was the producer and John Frankenheimer the director. George Bruce wrote the teleplay based on the memoir, The Family Nobody Wanted, by Helen Doss.

== Reception ==
J. P. Shanley of The New York Times credited the "excellent performances" of Fabray and Ayres and called it "charming entertainment."
