= Panic Button (Playhouse 90) =

- Playhouse 90 episode
- Episode no.: Season 2 Episode 12
- Directed by: Franklin Schaffner
- Written by: Rod Serling
- Original air date: November 28, 1957

Guest appearances
- Robert Stack as Jerry Cook; Vera Miles as Carolyn Cook; Lee J. Cobb as Al Bengsten

Episode chronology
← Previous "The Troublemakers"	Next → "Galvanized Yankee"

"Panic Button" was an American television play broadcast on November 28, 1957, as part of the second season of the CBS television series Playhouse 90. Rod Serling wrote the teleplay. Franklin Schaffner directed, Martin Manulis was the producer, and Dominick Dunne was the executive assistant. Robert Stack, Vera Miles, and Lee J. Cobb starred.

== Plot ==
The investigation into a plane crash concludes that it was caused by pilot error. At the inquiry, the co-pilot (Robert Stack) seeks to place the blame on the captain who died in the crash. In the end, the co-pilot is found to have been responsible for the crash, and his pilot's license is revoked.

== Cast ==
- Robert Stack as Jerry Cook
- Vera Miles as Carolyn Cook
- Lee J. Cobb as Al Bengsten
- Leif Erickson as Paul Henderson
- Marian Seldes as Kate Sullivan

== Reception ==
Television reviewer Harriet Van Horne praised Serling's story and cited it as proof that television drama had grown up, no longer having the need for a happy ending. She also praised the performances of Stack, Cobb, Seldes and Miles as valiant and true.

San Francisco Examiner reviewer Dwight Nelson praised the performances of Cobb and Stack but opined that Serling's story was "neither dull nor exciting. Just average for this year's "Playhouse 90" plays which have been distinguished for length than for content."
