= Natchez (Playhouse 90) =

- Playhouse 90 episodes
- Cliff Robertson and Felicia Farr in Natchez
- Episode nos.: Season 2 Episodes 36
- Directed by: David Lowell Rich
- Written by: Martin M. Goldsmith (teleplay), E.A. Ellington (story)
- Cinematography by: Gert Andersen
- Original air date: May 29, 1958

Guest appearances
- Cliff Robertson as Danny Carson; Macdonald Carey as Alexander Lamar; Thomas Mitchell as Mr. Carson

Episode chronology
← Previous "Bomber's Moon"	Next → "The Innocent Sleep"

"Natchez" is an American television play broadcast live on May 29, 1958, as part of the second season of the CBS television series Playhouse 90. Martin M. Goldsmith wrote the teleplay based on a story by E.A. Ellington. David Lowell Rich directed. Cliff Robertson, Macdonald Carey, and Thomas Mitchell starred.

== Plot ==
A Confederate prisoner of war returns to Mississippi after the end of the American Civil War. His father is viewed as a traitor because he did not participate in scorched-earth practices. The former POW falls in love with the wife of a man who operates a Mississippi River gambling boat.

== Cast ==
- Cliff Robertson as Danny Carson
- Macdonald Carey as Alexander Lamar
- Thomas Mitchell as Mr. Carson
- Felicia Farr as Valerie Lamar
- Ted de Corsia as Jenkins
- Dan Blocker
- Chubby Johnson
- Keith Vincent

== Production ==
William Froug was the producer, and David Lowell Rich directed. Martin M. Goldsmith wrote the teleplay based on a story by E.A. Ellington. The production was broadcast on May 29, 1958. It was part of the second season of Playhouse 90, an anthology television series that was voted "the greatest television series of all time" in a 1970 poll of television editors.
