= The Velvet Alley =

- Playhouse 90 episode
- Katharine Bard and Art Carney in The Velvet Alley
- Episode no.: Season 3 Episode 16
- Directed by: Franklin Schaffner
- Written by: Rod Serling
- Original air date: January 22, 1959

Guest appearances
- Art Carney as Ernie Pandish; Leslie Nielsen as Eddie Kirkley; Jack Klugman as Max Salter

Episode chronology
← Previous "The Blue Men"	Next → "A Quiet Game of Cards"

"The Velvet Alley" was an American television play broadcast on January 22, 1959 as part of the CBS television series, Playhouse 90. Rod Serling was the writer and Franklin Schaffner the director. The cast included Art Carney and Leslie Nielsen.

== Plot ==
A freelance writer in New York sells a script to Playhouse 90 and moves to Los Angeles. He becomes a success financially but neglects his wife and ends up being divorced and losing the respect of his father.

== Cast ==
Barry Sullivan hosted the broadcast. The cast includes the following.

- Art Carney as Ernie Pandish
- Leslie Nielsen as Eddie Kirkley
- Katharine Bard as Pat Pandish
- Jack Klugman as Max Salter
- Bonita Granville as Mrs. Kirkley
- George Voskovec as Steve Pandish
- Alexander Scourby as Harvey Diedrich
- David White as Freddie Henderson
- Micky Braddock, a.k.a. Micky Dolenz, as Melvin
- Eddie Ryder as Julius
- Martha Wentworth as Mrs. Cowznoski
- John Conwell as Kirkley's associate
- Dianne Cannon as Gloria
- Burt Reynolds as the Actor

== Production ==
The program aired on January 22, 1959, on the CBS television series Playhouse 90. Rod Serling wrote the teleplay. Franklin Schaffner was the director and Herbert Brodkin the producer.

== Reception ==
Jack Gould of The New York Times wrote that it lacked the searching insight of some of Serling's works, "but it was still a ninety-minute play of fairly consistent interest and the uncompromising final curtain carried its own power." Gould also praised Jack Klugman for an "exceptionally good" performance as the writer's agent.
