= The Lone Woman =

- Playhouse 90 episode
- Episode no.: Season 2 Episode 16
- Written by: Al C. Ward
- Original air date: December 26, 1957

Guest appearances
- Kathryn Grayson as Lone Woman; Scott Brady as William Bent; Vincent Price as Jesse White; Raymond Burr as Charles Bent

Episode chronology
← Previous "For I Have Loved Strangers"	Next → "Reunion"

"The Lone Woman" was an American television film broadcast on December 26, 1957, as part of the second season of the CBS television series Playhouse 90. Al C. Ward wrote the teleplay. Kathryn Grayson, Scott Brady, Vincent Price, and Raymond Burr starred. The production was filmed on location in Tucson, Arizona.

== Plot ==
Set in Colorado in 1830, the owner of a trading post seeks to annul the interracial marriage between his brother and a Cheyenne woman.

== Cast ==
The following cast received screen credit for their performances.

- Kathryn Grayson as Lone Woman
- Scott Brady as William Bent
- Vincent Price as Jesse White
- Raymond Burr as Charles Bent
- Jack Lord as Jim Kester
- Buddy Baer as Angel
- Harry Carey Jr. as Cliff Eastland

== Reception ==
Television critic Dwight Nelson wrote that the production was "occasionally tedious", but praised the "brawl" in the performance of Kathryn Grayson. Nelson also wrote that Vincent Price "had the most fun as an evil character."

Another critic, Richard Milne, called it a "high-class program" and opined that "the cast was excellent."
