= The Dingaling Girl =

- Playhouse 90 episode
- Episode no.: Season 3 Episode 21
- Directed by: Fielder Cook
- Written by: J.P. Miller
- Original air date: February 26, 1959
- Running time: 1:26:25

Guest appearances
- Diane Varsi at Lurene Dawson; Eddie Albert as Leroy Dawson; Mort Sahl as Dettering Rohn

Episode chronology
← Previous "The Raider"	Next → "Made in Japan"

"The Dingaling Girl" was an American television play broadcast on February 26, 1959 as part of the CBS television series, Playhouse 90. The cast included Diane Varsi, Eddie Albert, and Mort Sahl. Fielder Cook was the director and J.P. Miller the writer.

== Plot ==
A woman is offered a movie contract but prefers to stay at home with her children. Her husband pressures the woman to act and moves the family to Hollywood where she becomes a star.

== Cast ==
The cast includes the following.

- Eddie Albert as Leroy Dawson
- Diane Varsi as Lurene Dawson
- Edward S. Brophy as Gato Barch
- Sam Jaffe as Grandy
- Mort Sahl as Dettering Rohn

== Production ==
The program aired on February 26, 1959, on the CBS television series Playhouse 90. J.P. Miller was the writer and Fielder Cook the director.
