= The Thundering Wave =

- Playhouse 90 episodes
- Joan Bennett, Susan Oliver, and Franchot Tone in "The Thundering Wave"
- Episode nos.: Season 2 Episodes 14
- Directed by: John Frankenheimer
- Written by: Robert Alan Aurthur
- Original air date: December 12, 1957

Guest appearances
- James Mason as Sidney Lowe; Franchot Tone as Allen Grant; Joan Bennett as Vickie Maxwell

Episode chronology
← Previous "Galvanized Yankee"	Next → "For I Have Loved Strangers"

"The Thundering Wave" was an American television play broadcast on December 12, 1957, as part of the second season of the CBS television series Playhouse 90. John Frankenheimer directed. James Mason, Franchot Tone, and Joan Bennett starred.

== Plot ==
A separated couple are asked to perform together in a play. They disagree as to whether their daughter should be married.

== Cast ==
The following cast received screen credit for their performances.

- James Mason as Sidney Lowe
- Franchot Tone as Allen Grant
- Joan Bennett as Vickie Maxwell
- Pamela Mason as Marcia Lowe
- Susan Oliver as Louise Grant
- Jack Klugman as Lew Downs

== Production ==
John Frankenheimer was the director and Robert Alan Aurthur the writer. It was originally broadcast on December 12, 1957. It was part of the second season of Playhouse 90, an anthology television series that was voted "the greatest television series of all time" in a 1970 poll of television editors.
