= The Blue Men (Playhouse 90) =

- Playhouse 90 episode
- Newspaper advertisement for "The Blue Men"
- Episode no.: Season 3 Episode 15
- Directed by: John Frankenheimer
- Written by: Alvin Boretz
- Original air date: January 15, 1959

Guest appearances
- Edmond O'Brien as Roy Brenner; Jack Warden as Joe Cushing

Episode chronology
| ← Previous "The Wings of the Dove" | Next → "The Velvet Alley" |

"The Blue Men" was an American television play broadcast on January 15, 1959, as part of the CBS television series Playhouse 90. John Frankenheimer was the director and Alvin Boretz the writer. The cast included Edmond O'Brien and Jack Warden.

== Plot ==
The career of veteran New York police detective Roy Brenner is put on a departmental trial after he refuses to file charges against a boy accused of theft and an influential businessman questions his integrity.

== Cast ==
The cast includes the following.

- Edmond O'Brien as Roy Brenner
- Jack Warden as Joe Cushing
- Eileen Heckart as Rose
- Cameron Prud'homme as Capt. Marshak
- James Westerfield as Mack Harris
- David Lewis as Lanier
- Rafael Campos as Jules Roman
- Richard LePore as Ernie
