= The Last Man (Playhouse 90) =

- Playhouse 90 episode
- Sterling Hayden, Carolyn Jones, and Lee Philips in "The Last Man"
- Episode no.: Season 2 Episode 18
- Directed by: John Frankenheimer
- Written by: Aaron Spelling
- Original air date: January 9, 1958

Guest appearances
- Sterling Hayden as Mitch Barrett; Carolyn Jones as Julie

Episode chronology
← Previous "Reunion"	Next → "The 80 Yard Run"

"The Last Man" was an American television play broadcast live from CBS Television City in Hollywood on January 9, 1958, as part of the second season of the CBS television series Playhouse 90. Aaron Spelling wrote the teleplay, John Frankenheimer directed, and Paul Newman hosted. Sterling Hayden, Carolyn Jones, and Wallace Ford starred. It was later made into a feature film, One Foot in Hell.

== Plot ==
Set in the old West, Mitch Barrett's wife dies during childbirth. Barrett blames the heartlessness of the town's leaders who failed to assist. He seeks revenge by robbing the bank where the rich cattleman who runs the town has deposited his money.

== Cast ==
The following cast received screen credit for their performances.

- Sterling Hayden as Mitch Barrett
- Carolyn Jones as Julie
- Wallace Ford as Mule Rogers
- Hurd Hatfield as Ivers
- Mark Richman as Stu
- Lee Philips as Dan
- Malcolm Atterbury
- Stafford Repp
- Byron Foulger
- Douglas Henderson
- Burt Mustin
- Woodrow Chambliss
- Paul Bryar
- Michael Ross
- Jason Johnson
- James McCallion
- Tess Landess
- Bob Cross
- Garry Walberg
- Claudia Bryar
- Louise Fletcher
- Julia Meade
- Earl Parker
- Helen Richman as Mrs. Barrett
- Charles Bail as Cavalry Sergeant
