= Bomber's Moon (Playhouse 90) =

- Playhouse 90 episode
- Robert Cummings in "Bomber's Moon"
- Episode no.: Season 2 Episode 35
- Directed by: John Frankenheimer
- Written by: Rod Serling
- Original air date: May 22, 1958
- Running time: 90 minutes

Guest appearances
- Robert Cummings as Col. Culver; Rip Torn as Lt. Harrison; Hazel Court as Mary Jarvis; Martin Balsam as Capt. Mantell; Larry Gates as Major; J. Pat O'Malley as Pub keeper

Episode chronology
← Previous "Nightmare at Ground Zero"	Next → "Natchez"

"Bomber's Moon" is an American television play broadcast live on May 22, 1958, as part of the CBS television series, Playhouse 90. It is the thirty-fifth episode of the second season of Playhouse 90.

Rod Serling wrote the teleplay about American fliers stationed in England during World War II. John Frankenheimer directed. Robert Cummings, Rip Torn, Hazel Court, and Martin Balsam starred.

== Plot ==
An American bomber wing is stationed in England during World War II. The commanding officer, Col. Culver, is emotionless. He accuses a young flier of cowardice.

== Cast ==
- Robert Cummings as Col. Culver
- Rip Torn as Lt. Harrison
- Hazel Court as Mary Jarvis
- Martin Balsam as Capt. Mantell
- Larry Gates as Major
- J. Pat O'Malley as Pub keeper

Additionally, Cliff Robertson hosted the show.

== Production ==
Martin Manulis was the producer and John Frankenheimer the director. Rod Serling wrote the teleplay.

Frankenheimer said of Cummings: "Bobby's a really fine dramatic actor, but people usually associate him only with comedy. Naturally enough I suppose. Directing an actor like this who feels immediately what the script wants and what the director wants makes you love this business."

== Reception ==
In The New York Times, John P. Shanley praised Serling's dialogue as "fresh and striking", though occasionally "ornate and labored." He also praised the performances of Cummings, Torn, and Balsam.
