= Roger O. Hirson =

American dramatist and screenwriter (1926–2019)

- Born: Roger Overholt Hirson; May 5, 1926; Manhattan, New York City, U.S.
- Died: May 27, 2019 (aged 93); Manhattan, New York City, U.S.
- Occupations: Playwright, screenwriter
- Spouse: Alice Hirson (div.)
- Children: David Hirson (son)

Roger Overholt Hirson (May 5, 1926 – May 27, 2019) was an American dramatist and screenwriter best known for his books of the Broadway musicals, Pippin, for which he was nominated for a Tony Award, and Walking Happy. He contributed extensively for original television anthology series episodes since the 1950s and also wrote the screenplays or stories for several prominent films such as The Bridge at Remagen (1969).

== Early life ==
Hirson graduated from Friends Seminary in 1943.

== Filmography ==
- Alcoa Hour: "The Big Build-Up"
- Alcoa Hour: "Man on a Tiger"
- Goodyear Television Playhouse: "End of the Mission"
- Goodyear Television Playhouse: "Doing Her Bit"
- Goodyear Television Playhouse: "Mr. Dorothy Allen"
- Hallmark Hall of Fame: "A Bell for Adano"
- Kraft Television Theatre: "The Glass Wall"
- Playhouse 90: "The Long March"
- Playhouse 90: "Journey to the Day"
- Studio One: "Trial by Slander"
- Studio One: "The Weston Strain"
- Studio One: "Kurishiki Incident"
- Sunday Showcase: "One Loud Clear Voice"
- The Armstrong Circle Theatre: "The Zone of Silence" (1959)
- The Armstrong Circle Theatre: "Ghost Bomber: The Lady Be Good"
- The Armstrong Circle Theatre: "And Bring Home a Baby"
- The Armstrong Circle Theatre: "Thirty Days to Reconsider"
- The Armstrong Circle Theatre: "Money for Sale"
- The Armstrong Circle Theatre: "Terror at My Heels"(1956)
- The Armstrong Circle Theatre: "Error in Judgment: The Case of Prisoner #16688" (1957)
- The DuPont Show of the Week: "The Outpost"
- The DuPont Show of the Week: "Don't Go Upstairs"
- The DuPont Show of the Week: "Windfall"
- The Philco Television Playhouse: "The Basket Weaver" (1947)
- The Philco Television Playhouse: "The Miss America Story" (1947)
