= The Comedian (Playhouse 90) =

- Playhouse 90 episode
- Episode no.: Season 1 Episode 20
- Directed by: John Frankenheimer
- Written by: Rod Serling (teleplay); Ernest Lehman (story)
- Production code: 030
- Original air date: February 14, 1957

Guest appearances
- Mickey Rooney; Edmond O'Brien; Kim Hunter; Mel Tormé; Constance Ford

Episode chronology
← Previous "The Miracle Worker"	Next → "One Coat of White"

"The Comedian" is a 1957 live television drama written by Rod Serling from a novella by Ernest Lehman, directed by John Frankenheimer, and starring Mickey Rooney, Edmond O'Brien, Kim Hunter, Mel Tormé and Constance Ford.

Rooney's portrayal of a lecherous, vicious comedian who tears down everyone around him was widely praised.

The 90-minute drama was part of the anthology series Playhouse 90 on February 14, 1957. The show was captured on kinescope and is available on DVD.

== Opening narration and introduction by Claudette Colbert ==
"Live — from Television City in Hollywood — Playhouse 90 — Tonight starring Mickey Rooney, Edmond O'Brien, Kim Hunter, Mel Tormé, Constance Ford. On Playhouse 90, to introduce tonight's show, Miss Claudette Colbert." [Claudette Colbert stars in the February 21 episode, "One Coat of White". Many installments of Playhouse 90 were introduced by stars of episodes scheduled for the following week.]

"Good Evening. Tonight, Playhouse 90 presents "The Comedian", the story of a ruthless, but fascinating entertainer. "The Comedian" is the work of two writers, the author of the original story, Ernest Lehman, who has written the screenplays for such popular motion pictures as The King and I, Somebody Up There Likes Me and Executive Suite. The adapter, Rod Serling, whose long list of original television dramas includes the award-winning Patterns, Forbidden Area and Requiem for a Heavyweight. And now, "The Comedian."

== Plot summary ==
Egomaniacal television comedian Sammy Hogarth (Rooney) routinely makes fun of his brother Lester (Tormé) on the air, and is constantly bullying his writers for better material. Lester's wife Julie (Hunter) leaves Lester because of his cowardice. Unscrupulous columnist Ellwell (Bissell) publishes a column hinting at an affair between Sammy and Julie, deepening the humiliation.

Chief writer Al Preston (O'Brien), to keep his job, steals material from a writer who died during World War II. Preston is fired after confessing to the theft. Lester slaps Sammy during a performance, but returns to the role of the servile brother.

== Cast ==
- Mickey Rooney as Sammy Hogarth
- Edmond O'Brien as Al Preston
- Kim Hunter as Julie Hogarth
- Mel Tormé as Lester Hogarth
- Constance Ford as Connie
- Whit Bissell as Elwell
- King Donovan as the Director
- Eddie Ryder as Jake
- H. M. Wynant as Sonny
- Mike Ross as the Masseur

== Production ==
Rooney was cast in the role after a half-dozen other actors turned down the part. According to Frankenheimer, Mel Tormé was cast as Lester at the suggestion of Edmond O'Brien. Kim Hunter later recalled that during rehearsals Rooney often varied his performance dramatically, so that "no two days were alike," which might create problems during a live broadcast. However, Frankenheimer, then only in his twenties, was able to work with him to extract a memorable performance. Frankenheimer described him as "the most talented man I ever worked with," while also citing his "huge ego problems" and being "terribly temperamental" and "totally unpredictable." Frankenheimer said that Rooney "stunned everybody" by nailing the performance from the very first reading, while other actors were just getting used to the script.

The model for the central character has been a subject of much speculation over the years, and has included Milton Berle, Red Buttons and Arthur Godfrey. The film has parallels to Sweet Smell of Success, also originating from an Ernest Lehman story, with the same milieu and including one of the same characters in both works, columnist Otis Ellwell. It is most likely, however that Berle was the primary model. Lehman wrote a profile of Berle during his days hosting Texaco Star Theater, a time when Berle was notorious for his overbearing, dictatorial style, directing considerable venom at his brother, who worked on the show. The magazine that assigned Lehman considered the profile unprintable, fearing a lawsuit. Lehman then wrote a fictionalized treatment as The Comedian. Berle's only reaction to the production tends to confirm its origins with Lehman's article. "I wasn't that bad," he was reported to have said.

== Critical reaction ==
In his New York Times review, TV critic Jack Gould praised the performances, singling out Rooney as "extraordinary." He faulted the "long interludes of rudimentary and melodramatic sub-plots that tended to get in one another's way," but said that the "lasting over-all impression was a most powerful commentary.

== Awards ==
The Comedian won two Emmy Awards. It won an Emmy Award as Outstanding Single Program of the Year, while Serling received an Emmy for Best Teleplay Writing – One Hour or More. Rooney was nominated for an Emmy, his first. Tormé was nominated for a Best Supporting Actor Emmy but the category was cancelled.
