= Forbidden Area (Playhouse 90) =

- Playhouse 90 episode
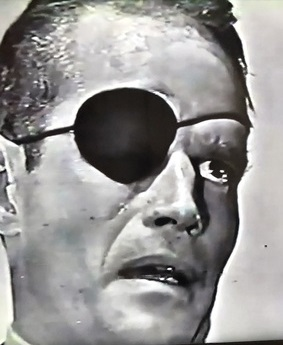
- Charlton Heston as Col. Jesse Price
- Episode no.: Season 1 Episode 1
- Directed by: John Frankenheimer
- Written by: Rod Serling
- Original air date: October 4, 1956

Guest appearances
- Charlton Heston as Col. Jesse Price; Tab Hunter as Stanley Smith; Diana Lynn as Catherine Hume; Vincent Price as Clark Simmons; Victor Jory as Rear Admiral Batt; Charles Bickford as General Keaton; Jackie Coogan as The Cook

Episode chronology
← Previous —	Next → "Requiem for a Heavyweight"

"Forbidden Area" was an American television play broadcast live on October 4, 1956, as part of the CBS television series, Playhouse 90. It was the premiere episode of the series. The play concerns efforts to thwart a massive, Christmastime nuclear attack from a fleet of Russian submarines located off the coast of the United States. Rod Serling wrote the screenplay, and John Frankenheimer directed. Charlton Heston, Tab Hunter, Diana Lynn, and Charles Bickford starred.

== Plot ==
Stanley Smith, a Soviet agent and explosives expert (played by Tab Hunter), prepares at "Little Chicago" outside Moscow for an undercover assignment. He is then transported by submarine to the coast of Florida and secures himself a post in the Air Force, serving at a kitchen on an air base in Florida.

At the "Forbidden Area" within the Pentagon, the "intentions of the enemy group" plans to defend a Soviet nuclear attack. The group includes Clark Simmons, the senior member (played by Vincent Price), Col. Jesse Price (played by Charlton Heston), the newest member, and Katharine Hume, the secretary (played by Diana Lynn). Price discloses plans for a new program of automatic retaliation using ICBMs with pre-set targeting. Intelligence reports suggest there may be a submarine-based Soviet nuclear attack.

Five American B-99 long-range bombers disappear suddenly from radar. General Keaton (played by Charles Bickford) leads the investigation, and a survivor mumbles about coffee. The planes were destroyed because Smith concealed pressure bombs, set to explode at 25,000 feet, in coffee thermoses used by the airmen on the B-99s. Smith murders a cook (played by Jackie Coogan) after the cook notices his Russian tooth filling.

Price believes the enemy seeks to have the B-99s grounded in order to open a window to attack while the American retaliatory ability is ineffective. He concludes the Soviet attack is coming on Christmas Eve. Simmons rejects Price's prediction as a fairy tale.

A fleet of 600 Soviet submarines approaches as America is "busy with its Christmas trees."

Hume professes her love for Price and urges him to flee with her. Price instead flies to Florida to brief Gen. Keaton. Keaton reverses the grounding the B-99s and pilots one of the planes as the crew searches for the pressure bomb.

Price becomes suspicious when Smith seeks to retrieve a coffee thermos from the control tower. He confronts Smith and learns that the canisters also explode when opened. Price warns Keaton, who is about to open a thermos, that it contains a bomb.

Smith is given truth serum, and American air and naval forces destroy the Soviet submarines as they approach the coast. The President addresses the country and reports that the country's bombers are approaching the Soviet Union. The Soviet Presidium resigns, and the new Soviet Premier agrees to withdraw its naval forces and ground its air forces. Keaton urges the President to continue with the retaliatory strike, but the President orders the return of the American bombers.

== Cast ==
Jack Palance served as the show's host. The following performers received screen credit for their performances:

- Charlton Heston as Col. Jesse Price
- Tab Hunter as Stanley Smith
- Diana Lynn as Catherine Hume
- Vincent Price as Clark Simmons
- Victor Jory as Rear Admiral Batt
- Charles Bickford as General Keaton
- Jackie Coogan as The Cook
- Tyler McVey as Brig. Gen. Cragey
- David Lewis as Felix Fromberg
- John Gallaudet as Gen. Cummings
- Eddie Ryder as Joe
- Harold Dyrenforth as Capt. Schiller
- Howard Price as Clint
- Richard Gaines as Admiral
- Thomas Palmer as Senator
- Arthur Batanides as Fensky
- William Schallert as Commentator
- Robin Morse as Bartender
- Don Donaldson as Operations Officer
- Don Lutz as Control Operator
- Jason Wingreen as The Captain
- Gil Frye as Radar Man
- Marland Messner as The Survivor
- Joel Fluellen as Mechanic

== Production ==
In May 1956, Martin Manulis, producer of a new CBS series, Playhouse 90, announced he had acquired television rights to Pat Frank's novel Forbidden Area. CBS later announced that Forbidden Area, with the story adaptation for television by Rod Serling, would air as the premiere installment of Playhouse 90.

Manulis had previously produced the Climax! series and brought director John Frankenheimer with him from that series. Frankenheimer was tabbed to direct Forbidden Area. Manulis also assembled an all-star cast for Forbidden Area, including Charlton Heston, Tab Hunter, and Vincent Price. He noted that Hunter, who usually played a hero, was cast against type playing a villain. Rehearsals began during the week of September 16.

The aspect of Forbidden Area that fascinated Manulis was the idea that the Russians had developed an American town in the heart of Russia where future spies were immersed in American culture, speaking only English, and following baseball. Manulis hired teen idol Hunter to play a young Russian training in the spy village.

The production was staged on October 4, 1956, at CBS Television City in Los Angeles. The program opened with host Jack Palance announcing that it was "opening night" as television took a "giant step" with an important new series of 90-minute dramas performed each week.

Forbidden Area was the first installment in the four-year run of the series. Playhouse 90 was voted "the greatest television series of all time" in a 1970 poll of television editors.

== Reception ==
In The New York Times, Jack Gould wrote that the production "ran the gamut of hokum" and employed "every cliche in the book of elementary video dramaturgy."

The Washington Post called it a "superb production ... brilliantly produced" in which Hunter was "splendid."

John Crosby of the New York Herald Tribune wrote that the production, depicting Russia on the march with planes and submarines, "all groaning with hydrogen bombs, intent on knocking out this country", had its moments "as a thriller." Crosby also praised John Frankenheimer's skill in jumping back and forth between the Pentagon and the saboteurs. However, he found that the script was "slipshod" and that the production suffered from "grave weaknesses" as a drama.

Hunter said, "I got good notices for my performance but critics were lukewarm overall. It was the following week's installment... Requiem for a Heavyweight that scored the knockout".
