= The Country Husband (Playhouse 90) =

- Playhouse 90 episode
- Kerwin Mathews and Felicia Farr in "The Country Husband"
- Episode no.: Season 1 Episode 5
- Directed by: James Neilson
- Written by: Paul Monash (teleplay), John Cheever (short story)
- Original air date: November 1, 1956

Guest appearances
- Frank Lovejoy as William Wiley; Barbara Hale as Julia Wiley; Felicia Farr as Anne Murchison

Episode chronology
← Previous "Rendezvous in Black"	Next → "The Big Slide"

"The Country Husband" was an American television movie broadcast on November 1, 1956, as part of the CBS television series, Playhouse 90.

== Plot ==
After a car crash and the arrival of a beautiful babysitter, a young businessman, William Wiley, considers leaving his wife for the babysitter.

== Cast ==
- Frank Lovejoy as William Wiley
- Barbara Hale as Julia Wiley
- Felicia Farr as Anne Murchison
- Kerwin Mathews as Clay Farrell
- Herbert Rudley as Farrell Sr.
- Jeanne Cooper as Shirl
- John Zaremba as Mr. Murchison
- Hugh Sanders as Robert Guinness
- S. John Launer as Passenger

Additionally, Red Skelton hosted the program.

== Production ==
The film was produced by Screen Gems beginning in June 1956. Eva Wolas was the producer and James Neilson the director. Paul Monash wrote the teleplay based on a short story ("The Country Husband") by John Cheever.
