= James P. Cavanagh =

American television writer (1922–1971)

James P. Cavanagh (1922 – September 25, 1971) was an American television writer. He wrote numerous episodes for Alfred Hitchcock Presents and won a Primetime Emmy in 1957 for his teleplay Fog Closing In. Cavanagh wrote the first script for the 1960 film Psycho. Though the script was rejected by Hitchcock it contained many similarities with the final version, written by Joseph Stefano.

== Biography ==
Cavanagh was born in 1922. His work on teleplays included The Opposite Virtues, a 1962 episode of Bus Stop, and the 1963 Miss Marple film Murder at the Gallop.

Cavanagh worked frequently on the Alfred Hitchcock Presents television series including the 1956 episodes The Hidden Thing and The Creeper, which were praised by producer Joan Harrison for their macabre comedy. Cavanagh won a 1957 Primetime Emmy for "Best Teleplay Writing, Half Hour or Less" for his episode Fog Closing In.

Cavanagh wrote the first screenplay for Hitchcock's 1960 film Psycho. He had been recommended to Hitchcock by Harrison and was appointed on June 8, 1959. It was Cavanagh's first movie script. Cavanagh's script bore striking similarities to Cavanagh's Alfred Hitchcock Presents 1957 teleplay One More Mile to Go about a henpecked husband who, after his wife dies, packs her body into the trunk of his car and goes on the run, intending to dispose of her body in a lake. He is pursued by a dogged police officer. Hitchcock's script supervisor Peggy Robertson thought Cavanagh's writing for Psycho was dull and it was rejected by Hitchcock, who paid Cavanagh a severance of $7,166 on July 27. Robert Philip Kolker writing in 2004 considered that Cavanagh's script was caught between a television episode and a feature-length film and lacked the "self-confidence, insouciance and black wit" that Cavanagh had demonstrated in his television work.

The final Psycho script was written by Joseph Stefano though it included elements of Cavanagh's work such as the theft of money by Marion Crane to allow her to marry her boyfriend, the car journey she makes (including trading in the vehicle) and stopping the night at the motel run by Norman Bates. Cavanagh also wrote Crane dining with Bates before deciding to return the money, much of the iconic shower murder scene and Bates' disposal of Crane's car in a swamp. Much of Cavanagh's dialogue between Crane and Bates is preserved in the finished film.

His later teleplays for Alfred Hitchcock Presents included the episodes Coming, Mama (1961) and Where Beauty Lies (1962). Cavanagh adapted Susan Glaspell's 1917 play Trifles for the series, as the episode A Jury of Her Peers. The move was described as surprising given that the play was thought to be critical of patriarchy and the legal system. Cavanagh had experience in adapting plays for television through work on Playhouse 90 and Kraft Television Theatre. Cavanagh retained very little of Glaspell's dialogue, renamed some characters and inserted additional scenes.

Cavanagh died on September 25, 1971.
