= Merle Miller =

American novelist (1919-1986)

Merle Dale Miller (May 17, 1919 – June 10, 1986) was an American writer, novelist, and author, who gained notability with his best-selling biography of Harry S. Truman, and as a pioneer in the gay rights movement.

Miller came out of the closet in an article in the New York Times Magazine on January 17, 1971, "What It Means to Be a Homosexual." The response of over 2,000 letters to the article, more than ever received by that newspaper, led to a book publication later that year. The book was reprinted by Penguin Classics in 2012, with a new foreword by Dan Savage and a new afterword by Charles Kaiser.

== Life and career ==
Merle Miller was born in Montour, Iowa, and raised in Marshalltown, Iowa, attending the University of Iowa and the London School of Economics. Before World War II, he was a Washington correspondent for the late Philadelphia Record. During the war, Miller served both in the Pacific and in Europe as a war correspondent and editor for Yank, The Army Weekly.

Following his discharge from the Army, he was an editor at Harper and Time magazines. He also worked as a book reviewer for The Saturday Review of Literature and as a contributing editor for The Nation. His work appeared frequently in the New York Times Magazine.

During the course of a writing career that spanned several decades, Miller wrote numerous novels, including the best-selling classic post war novel, That Winter (1948). His other novels are Island 49 (1945); The Sure Thing (1949); Reunion (1954); A Day in Late September (1956); A Secret Understanding (1956); A Gay and Melancholy Sound (1961); and What Happened (1972). He also wrote the novel The Warm Feeling, but since the publisher did not give him the opportunity to read and edit the manuscript, he publicly disowned the novel and would not have anything to do with it.

His works of non-fiction include We Dropped the A-Bomb (1946), a book he wrote in collaboration with Abe Spitzer, a radioman who was on the bomber The Great Artiste, one of the three B-29s that participated in the atom bombing of Hiroshima and Nagasaki; The Judges and The Judged (1952); Only You Dick Daring (1964), Miller's scathing account of trying to make a show with CBS for the 1963-1964 television season; and On Being Different: What It Means To Be a Homosexual (1971). Miller was a contributor to A Treasury of Great Reporting; The Best of Yank; and Yank: The GI Story of the War.

In 1967 he signed the "Writers and Editors War Tax Protest," vowing to refuse to pay taxes raised to fund the Vietnam War.

Miller wrote many television plays and was the author of the screenplays for The Rains of Ranchipur (1955), which starred Richard Burton and Lana Turner, and Kings Go Forth (1958), featuring Frank Sinatra and Natalie Wood. He wrote several drafts of a screenplay for Walk on the Wild Side but by the time the screen version was being shot it was so far removed from what he had written or had in mind that he refused any screen credit. His postwar career as a television script writer and novelist was interrupted by the advent of Senator Joseph McCarthy and Miller's inclusion on the Hollywood blacklist. He did not re-enter TV until the late 1950s and early 60s.

After the success of Plain Speaking, Miller wrote two more biographies, Lyndon, A Biography of President Lyndon Baines Johnson, and Ike the Soldier, a biography of General Dwight D. Eisenhower. He had completed all the interviews and research with the intention of writing a second volume, to be titled Ike the President, but died just after finishing the first volume Ike the Soldier.

Miller died on June 10, 1986, in Danbury Hospital in Connecticut, from peritonitis following surgery to remove a ruptured appendix.

Merle Miller Special Collections containing all of his taped interviews, research material, notes and correspondence are housed at three presidential libraries in Missouri, Texas and Kansas, as well as the University of Iowa and Boston University. They are all open and available to the public.

== Plain Speaking: An Oral Biography of Harry S. Truman ==
In 1962, Miller was hired by producer Robert Alan Aurthur as part of a team to interview and write the script for a proposed series on ex-President Harry Truman. He spent hundreds of hours with Truman both at the Truman Library in Independence, Missouri, and at the Carlyle Hotel in New York City, but all three of the major networks were not interested in the series and turned it down. Miller felt that perhaps the time was not right, that many people were not aware of the greatness of the man, and that it was possible that the country was not ready to look back at the Truman years. He also felt one of the reasons it was never shown on television, even as late as 1962, was that he had been a blacklisted writer.

Miller did not know what to do with the interviews, some on tape and some taking up four full-sized file cabinets. He wanted to write a book about Truman, but he did not want it to be a biography. Truman died in 1972, and Miller was asked to appear on television and tell some Truman stories, some of which he had been entertaining friends with over the years. Someone at the station suggested that he should write a book that made use of some of the stories. He still had the tapes and the mountains of notes he had made after each conversation, and so he went home and put together a thirty-page proposal. It was turned down by at least eight publishers before it was picked up by G. P. Putnam's Sons.

Plain Speaking is a book based on conversations between Miller and the 33rd president of the United States, as well as others who knew Truman over the years. Robert A. Aurthur said, "No one will ever study or write about the time of Truman again without a bow of gratitude to Merle Miller. Never has a President of the United States, or any head of state for that matter, been so totally revealed, so completely documented...."

In October 1974, on a stop in Independence, Missouri, promoting the book, Miller was presented the key to the city by Mayor Richard King, who stated: "You captured the spirit of Harry S. Truman, and President Truman represents the spirit of Independence." While there Miller was interviewed by the editor of a local newspaper and asked if he had received any serious criticism of his treatment of the Truman tapes. "Only minor criticism," Miller replied. "One of the controversial points was Mr. Truman's interpretation of the meeting with MacArthur at Wake Island. I'm satisfied that the account Mr. Truman gave me is correct."

The book received generally positive reviews, although one later critic—Dr. Robert Ferrell of Indiana University—has questioned the authenticity and accuracy of some of the statements that Miller attributed to Truman.

Within a short time of publication, Plain Speaking was listed as number one on the New York Times best-selling list where it remained for over a year. It stayed in print, either in hard or soft cover for many years and, as late as 2004, was published as a "Classic Bestseller" by Black Dog and Leventhal.

Plain Speaking was adapted for television in 1976 by the Public Broadcasting Service, for which Ed Flanders received an Emmy Award for his portrayal of Truman.

=== Controversy ===
In 1995 Plain Speaking became the focus of a controversy. Robert H. Ferrell, a historian who had also published a biography of Truman, asserted that Miller had fabricated many of the quotes in his book.

In Plain Speaking, Miller quoted Truman as referring to General Douglas MacArthur as a "dumb-son-of-a-bitch" and quoted Truman as asserting that Dwight Eisenhower, his successor in the Oval Office, tried to divorce his wife Mamie in order to marry Kay Summersby, his English chauffeur and secretary during World War II. In Miller's recounting, Truman claimed that General George C. Marshall wrote Eisenhower a letter threatening to ruin his career if he divorced his wife. According to Ferrell, Truman never actually said any of this, and he accused Miller of simply making up Truman's quotes to make his book more interesting and lively. A similar issue occurred with comments that Miller claimed Truman said about his former attorney general and later Supreme Court appointee, Justice Tom C. Clark. Ferrell claimed that Miller's papers on file in the Truman presidential library include no references to a number of Truman's quotes in Plain Speaking, and in his opinion the quotes are most likely forgeries created by Miller, and are not real Truman quotes or statements. Ferrell also noted that Miller waited until nearly two years after Truman's death to publish Plain Speaking. In 1963 Truman wrote a letter to Miller which read: "I thank you for sending me the article which you [Miller] proposed for the Saturday Evening Post. I am not in favor of such articles, especially this one which has so many misstatements of fact in it. I am sorry that that is the case and if you publish it I shall make that statement public." According to Ferrell, Truman did not mail the letter to Miller, but instead chose to hire a law firm and threatened to sue, which forced Miller to withdraw the proposed article for the Saturday Evening Post, and, in Ferrell's view, led him to wait until after Truman's death to publish Plain Speaking to avoid the possibility of any legal action.

Truman biographer David McCullough also criticized the historical accuracy of Plain Speaking, noting that in Truman's famous meeting with General MacArthur on Wake Island in 1950, "MacArthur [in the book] would be pictured deliberately trying to upstage Truman by circling the airstrip, waiting for Truman to land first, thus putting the President in the position of having to wait for the general. But it did not happen that way. MacArthur was not only on the ground, he had arrived the night before." McCullough also wrote that "[in] many of his observations to Miller, [Truman] was more harsh than he meant or that he indicated at the time."

With regard to any criticism of the book, Miller had this to say in the preface to Plain Speaking: "Truman told it the way he remembered it. So as I think Mr. Truman would have said, the hell with the purists. There are already hundreds of books and there will be hundreds more to clear up those small details that Mr. Truman and his friends may have misremembered...."
