= Russell S. Hughes =

American screenwriter

Russell Sheldon Hughes (January 15, 1910 – April 16, 1958) was an American screenwriter who was raised in Cincinnati. He began his career as a writer in the 1930s working on radio programs for WLW in Cincinnati. He later spent two years in New York City before moving to Hollywood. His motion picture credits included Thunder Over the Plains (1953), Them! (1954, adaptation), The Yellow Mountain (1954), The Last Frontier (1955), and Jubal (1956). He also wrote extensively for television, including episodes of Maverick, Perry Mason, Zane Grey Theater, and Have Gun – Will Travel. He died of a heart attack in 1958 at his home in North Hollywood, California.
