= Requiem for a Heavyweight =

- Playhouse 90 episode
- Episode no.: Season 1 Episode 2
- Directed by: Ralph Nelson
- Teleplay by: Rod Serling
- Original air date: 1956
- Running time: 90 minutes

Guest appearances
- Jack Palance; Keenan Wynn

Episode chronology
← Previous "Forbidden Area"	Next → "Sizeman and Son"

"Requiem for a Heavyweight" is a teleplay written by Rod Serling and produced for the live television show Playhouse 90 on 11 October 1956. Six years later, it was adapted into the 1962 feature film of the same name starring Anthony Quinn, Jackie Gleason, Mickey Rooney, and Julie Harris.

The teleplay won a Peabody Award, the first given to an individual script in television, and helped establish Serling's reputation. The broadcast was directed by Ralph Nelson and is generally considered one of the finest examples of live television drama in the United States, as well as being Serling's personal favorite of his own work. Nelson and Serling won Emmy Awards for their work.

== Plot ==
Keenan Wynn, Jack Palance and Ed Wynn, in character

Harlan "Mountain" McClintock is a once-promising but now washed-up boxer who faces the end of his career after he is savagely defeated by a younger boxer. McClintock is managed by Maish, while Army serves as his cut man.

McClintock is suffering from punch drunk syndrome, a form of brain damage caused by his career. A fight doctor refuses to certify McClintock for further boxing, saying that another rough match could blind or even kill him. Boxing is all McClintock has ever known, and he is both terrified of trying something new and intensely loyal to Maish, who has nurtured him from his youth. Maish has troubles of his own, however: he owes money to the Mafia and tried to raise funds by betting that McClintock would be knocked out early by the young boxer, but lost a fortune when McClintock gamely and bravely took a beating, refusing to go down.

Grace Carney is an employment agency worker who tries to help McClintock make a transition to a new career. Maish persuades the unflinchingly loyal McClintock to turn to professional wrestling, though McClintock is proud that he never had a fixed fight and is uncomfortable with the staged, predetermined wrestling match.

Army disapproves of Maish's plans and refuses to be a part of them. Just before he is scheduled to go into the wrestling ring in a humiliating mountain man costume, McClintock learns Maish bet against him in his last match and parts ways with his manager and mentor. Though he feels that boxing can ruin men's lives, Maish finds another promising young boxer to train. McClintock takes a chance on working with children at summer camp.

== Cast ==
- Jack Palance as Harlan "Mountain" McClintock
- Keenan Wynn as Maish
- Kim Hunter as Grace Carney
- Ed Wynn as Army
- Joe Abdullah as Fight Announcer
- Max Baer as Mike
- Eddie Cantor as Host
- Ted Christy as Wrestler
- Karl "Killer" Davis as Wrestler
- Ned Glass as Bartender
- Young Jack Johnson as Champ
- Lyn Osborn as Photographer
- Ivan Rasputin as Wrestler
- Frank Richards as Fighter in Bar
- Abe Simon as Fighter in Bar
- Max Rosenbloom as Steve

== Background ==
Because Serling and Palance were both experienced boxers, they brought a level of authenticity to Requiem for a Heavyweight, although there was very little boxing depicted in the broadcast. Requiem for a Heavyweight was the beginning of what became one of the new medium's most successful creative teams, writer Rod Serling and director Ralph Nelson.

== Adaptations ==
=== British television version ===
BBC Television in the United Kingdom screened a version of the play in their regular Sunday Night Theatre anthology strand on March 31, 1957. Sean Connery, five years before portraying James Bond, starred as McClintock, while Alvin Rakoff produced and, with Serling's approval, also wrote some new material to cover costume changes that took place during commercial breaks on US television, but could not do so on the non-commercial BBC. Co-starring with Connery were Warren Mitchell and Rakoff's future wife Jacqueline Hill, who had recommended Connery for the leading part. Michael Caine was featured in a small role in a new scene written by Rakoff.

This production was reviewed in The Times newspaper the following day, which gave it a generally positive assessment, with some reservations. "It is unfortunate that Mr. Serling has allowed a saccharine romance to intrude into this self-sufficient and wholly masculine situation. Otherwise his touch is sure. Although physically miscast as the fighter, Mr. Sean Connery played with a shambling and inarticulate charm that almost made the love affair credible." This version has not survived, although the discovery of a complete recording of the soundtrack was announced in 2014. It had been in possession of Rakoff, who had made a recording at the time of transmission for posterity.

=== Dutch television version ===
In 1959 Dutch television adapted the story as Requiem voor een zwaargewicht starring Ko van Dijk as Malloy, Ton van Duinhoven as Manager, and Jan Blaaser as Verzorger.

=== American feature film version ===
The play was adapted into the 1962 feature film of the same name starring Anthony Quinn, Jackie Gleason, Mickey Rooney, and Julie Harris.

=== Italian television version ===
In 1970 Italian television RAI Radiotelevsione Italiana adapted the story as Requiem per un peso massimo, starring Massimo Foschi as McClintock.

=== Yugoslav television version ===
In 1974 Radio Television Belgrade adapted the story as Rekvijem za teškaša.

=== Broadway version ===
In 1985, it was adapted into a short-lived Broadway version at the Martin Beck Theatre starring John Lithgow as Harlan and George Segal as Maish.

=== The Man in the Funny Suit ===
In 1960, Ralph Nelson wrote and directed The Man in the Funny Suit, a dramatic account of Keenan Wynn's travails in helping his father, comedian Ed Wynn, play such a serious role on live television in Requiem for a Heavyweight.

== See also ==
- List of boxing films
