= Vincent J. Donehue =

American film director

Vincent Julian Donehue (September 22, 1915 – January 17, 1966) was an American director noted mainly for his theater work, with occasional film and television credits.

== Biography ==
Vincent Donehue was born in Whitehall, New York. He was a graduate of the Christian Brothers Academy and the New York State Teachers' College, now University at Albany, both in Albany, New York. He served in the Army Air Force for 5 years.

His early theatre credits include playing the role of Cinna the Poet in the Mercury Theatre's 1938 touring production of Caesar.

His Broadway credits as director include The Trip to Bountiful (1953) starring Lillian Gish, Jo Van Fleet and Eva Marie Saint, The Traveling Lady (1954) with Kim Stanley, Tennessee Williams' 27 Wagons Full of Cotton (1955) with Maureen Stapleton, Sunrise at Campobello (1958) which won him the Tony Award for Best Direction, the Richard Rodgers and Oscar Hammerstein II musical The Sound of Music (1959) starring Mary Martin, which earned him another Tony nomination, Daughter of Silence (1961), Lord Pengo (1962) with Charles Boyer and Agnes Moorehead, Jennie (1963) with Mary Martin and Catch Me if You Can. He also restaged the 1954 Mary Martin Peter Pan for television in 1960, the third telecast of the Broadway stage musical.

His film credits include Lonelyhearts (1958) with Montgomery Clift, Robert Ryan and Myrna Loy and Sunrise at Campobello (1960) which won Greer Garson the Golden Globe for Best Actress and several Academy Award nominations. The film was also entered into the 2nd Moscow International Film Festival.

He directed television plays in the 1950s.

He died in New York of Hodgkin's disease, age 50.
