= Martin Manulis =

American film, television and theatre producer (1915–2007)

- Manulis in 2004
- Born: Martin Ellyot Manulis; May 30, 1915; Park Slope, Brooklyn, New York, U.S.
- Died: September 28, 2007 (aged 92); Los Angeles, California, U.S.
- Education: Columbia University
- Occupations: Film, television and theater producer
- Spouse: Katharine Bard (m. 1939; died 1983)
- Children: 3

Martin Ellyot Manulis (May 30, 1915 – September 28, 2007) was an American television, film, and theatre producer. Manulis was best known for his work in the 1950s producing the CBS Television programs Suspense, Studio One Summer Theatre, Climax!, The Best of Broadway and Playhouse 90. He was the sole producer of the award-winning drama series, Playhouse 90, during its first two seasons from 1956 to 1958.

After leaving Playhouse 90, Manulis was the "head of television" for 20th Century Fox Television where he was responsible for creating and producing the series, The Many Loves of Dobie Gillis, Adventures in Paradise, and Five Fingers. In 1962, he produced the film Days of Wine and Roses starring Jack Lemmon and Lee Remick.

== Early years ==
Manulis was born and raised in the Park Slope neighborhood of Brooklyn, New York. His father, Abraham "Gus" Manulis, immigrated to the United States from Russia in 1897, became a naturalized U.S. citizen in 1911, and operated a drug store in Park Slope. His mother, Anna, was born in New York, the daughter of Russian immigrants. His older brother, Frederick, became a doctor and moved to Palm Beach, Florida.

Manulis attended public schools in Brooklyn and graduated from Manual Training High School in Park Slope. At age 16, Manulis enrolled at Columbia College, Columbia University, majoring in English literature with aspirations to become a journalist. While at Columbia, he became involved in a student theater production. After receiving a favorable review from Lucius Beebe, Manulis continued to perform in all-male varsity stage productions. For three years, he played leading female roles. He spent one summer while still in college performing in summer stock in Bar Harbor, Maine. In 1935, he played the lead role as a night club performer in Columbia's production of "Flair Flair, the Idol of Paree."

== Live theater ==
Manulis graduated from Columbia in 1935 and began working as an assistant for Ben Boyer, the business manager for producer Max Gordon, at a salary of $25 a week. Manulis also produced summer stock at Bass Rocks in Gloucester, Massachusetts, in partnership with Henry Levin. They invited John C. Wilson, a producer who was then affiliated with Noël Coward, to attend one of their productions. Wilson attended the performance and hired Manulis to work in his Broadway office. While employed by Wilson, Manulis directed rehearsals of understudies and reviewed scripts.

Manulis was married in 1939 to Katherine Bard, an actress and the daughter of Ralph Austin Bard, who served as Assistant Secretary of the Navy during World War II. The couple had three children. Also in 1939, he acted in a short-lived Broadway production of They Walked Alone with Elsa Lanchester. This was Manulis's last acting performance. He later joked that his character died at the end of Act II, and a critic panned his performance and suggested that the production could be improved if Manulis's character were killed instead at the end of Act I.

By 1940, Manulis was living on East 9th Street in Manhattan with his wife. He was a theater director and she was an actress. In June 1940, he was hired as a regular director at the Bass Rocks Theatre in Gloucester.

In early 1942, after the United States entered World War II, Manulis served as a lieutenant in the U.S. Navy and was stationed in London, England, censoring mail for war sensitive information. He met and became friends with Noël Coward while stationed in London during the war. After the war, Manulis became associated with the Westport Country Playhouse in Connecticut. He was the managing director at Westport for the summers from 1946 through 1950. By 1950, he had developed a reputation as the "superb manager-director" of the Westport Playhouse.

Manulis's stage productions in the post-war years include the following:

- In February 1946, Manulis directed The Duchess Misbehaves at the Adelphi Theatre.
- In September 1946, Manulis directed It's a Man's World at Westport.
- In October 1946, Manulis directed his wife in the lead role in Made in Heaven! at the Henry Miller Theatre.
- In January 1948, Manulis directed Shirley Booth in The Survivors at the Playhouse.
- During the summer of 1950, Manulis directed his wife in The Long Days in the Theatre Guild's experimental course at Westport.
- In November 1950, Manulis was the director of Pride's Crossing, a play starring Mildred Dunnock and co-starring his wife at Broadway's Biltmore Theatre.
- In January 1951, Manulis produced Springtime for Henry starring Edward Everett Horton and Manulis's wife at the winter stock season in the Bahamas.
- In January 1952, Manulis co-produced the winter stock season at the Bahama Playhouse at the British Colonial Hotel in Nassau. He directed two of the productions, including Goodbye Again starring Tom Ewell and Manulis's wife.

== Television producer ==
In 1951, Manulis was hired by Charles Underwood as a staff producer for CBS Television. Although his wife had acted on television, Manulis had no personal experience in television and did not even own a television at the time. He was trained in television production by Worthington Miner at CBS Television. Manulis was then assigned to take over as the producer of Casey, Crime Photographer, a half hour primetime drama. Manulis worked on Casey for approximately six months and hired Darren McGavin to take over the lead role.

After the Casey program, Manulis was assigned to take over from Robert Stevens as the producer of Suspense, a weekly primetime half-hour anthology. Manulis worked on Suspense for about a year from 1952 to 1953 and worked with casts that included Christopher Plummer. In 1953, Manulis was assigned to produce Studio One Summer Theatre, the summer version of CBS' 60-minute dramatic anthology series.

=== The Best of Broadway ===
In the fall of 1954, Manulis created and produced a new, once-a-month, 60-minute anthology series for CBS called The Best of Broadway. The show featured adaptations of former Broadway hits and was broadcast live in color from New York City. Manulis later recalled the challenge of producing one of the first television shows in color, including the unwieldy color cameras and lighting problems. From September 1954 through February 1955, Manulis produced the first six episodes of the series, as follows:

- The Royal Family of Broadway starring Helen Hayes, Fredric March, and Claudette Colbert (September 1954);
- The Man Who Came to Dinner starring Monty Woolley, Merle Oberon, and Joan Bennett (October 1954);
- Panama Hattie starring Ethel Merman, Jack E. Leonard, and Art Carney (November 1954);
- The Philadelphia Story starring Dorothy McGuire, John Payne, and Mary Astor (December 1954);
- Arsenic and Old Lace starring Edward Everett Horton, Peter Lorre, and Orson Bean (January 1955); and
- The Show-Off starring Jackie Gleason and Thelma Ritter (February 1955).

While working on The Best of Broadway, Manulis hired a young Sidney Lumet to direct The Philadelphia Story and The Show-Off.

=== Climax! ===
In February 1955, after production problems with its new anthology series Climax! culminating with an extra playing the part of a murder victim standing up and dusting himself off in full view of the audience, CBS fired the producer and director and sent Manulis to Los Angeles to take over as the show's producer. Manulis brought John Frankenheimer with him to Los Angeles to work as the director of Climax! The show broadcast live every four weeks from CBS Television City in the Fairfax District of Los Angeles. Manulis produced 18 episodes of the series, including adaptations of A Farewell to Arms and Adventures of Huckleberry Finn.

=== Playhouse 90 ===
Manulis is most remembered for his work as the producer of Playhouse 90, a weekly anthology series broadcast live on Thursday nights from CBS Television City in Los Angeles. In 1956, CBS executive, Frank Stanton, decided to air a 90-minute drama series with high production values. The initial concept was to have a troika of producers divide the work, but Manulis was dissatisfied with the arrangement and withdrew. Ultimately, CBS relented and agreed to have Manulis produce every episode with Dominick Dunne and two others assisting him on production.

Manulis produced the series for its first two seasons, hiring high quality talent to appear in the productions and using talented young writers and directors, including Rod Serling, John Frankenheimer, Arthur Penn, Arthur Hiller, and George Roy Hill. Each show had a three-week production cycle, meaning that Manulis regularly had three 90-minute dramas in varying stages production simultaneously. In a 1957 interview with The New York Times, Manulis said he viewed his job on Playhouse 90 as a combination of "mother, wet nurse and psychiatrist". In 1996, he recalled the hectic schedule as follows: “It's simple. You rehearse three weeks, do the dress and make the changes sponsors and the network demand, you do the performance for the East Coast, you go home and watch the kinescope for the West Coast, you cut your throat and go to bed!"

Playhouse 90 won six Emmy Awards in its first season, including an Emmy for best single program of the year for Requiem for a Heavyweight written by Rod Serling, directed by Ralph Nelson, and starring Jack Palance, Keenan Wynn and Ed Wynn. The show also won five Emmy Awards in its second season and was voted the greatest television series of all time in a 1970 poll of television editors.

The episodes that Manulis produced from 1956 to 1958 included:

- Forbidden Area directed by John Frankenheimer, adapted by Rod Serling and starring Charlton Heston (Episode 1, October 4, 1956);
- Requiem for a Heavyweight (Episode 2, October 11, 1956);
- The Ninth Day directed by John Frankenheimer and starring Piper Laurie (Episode 15, January 10, 1957)
- The Miracle Worker directed by Arthur Penn (Episode 19, February 7, 1957);
- The Comedian written by Rod Serling, directed by John Frankenheimer and starring Mickey Rooney and Mel Tormé (Episode 20, February 14, 1957);
- Three Men on a Horse directed by Arthur Hiller and starring Johnny Carson and Carol Channing (Episode 29, April 18, 1957);
- The Helen Morgan Story directed by George Roy Hill and starring Polly Bergen (Episode 33, May 16, 1957).
- The Eighty Yard Run starring Paul Newman and Joanne Woodward (Season 2, January 16, 1958);

Manulis later recalled that the quality of some of the productions declined in the second season. Asked to pick the worst "clinker" in his run as producer of Playhouse 90, Manulis chose the season two premiere episode, The Death of Manolete, starring Jack Palance in ill-fitting bullfighter clothes and model Suzy Parker as the love interest. He later wondered how a group of sophisticated men (including himself and John Frankenheimer) could have gone forward with a live show featuring a bull that was "played by a fake bull's head with a couple of stage hands jerking the head up and down in the middle of people and between things lying below the camera."

=== Fox Television ===
In 1958, Manulis left Playhouse 90 and took a three-month break to tour Europe with his family. He returned in the fall of 1958 as the "head of television" at 20th Century Fox Television. He later recalled that, as soon as he arrived at Fox, he knew it was wrong. None of his directors or writers followed him to Fox. Manulis tried to quit shortly after arriving, but Spyros Skouras refused to release him. Manulis stayed, and he discovered a proposal for a series that he developed as The Many Loves of Dobie Gillis, starring Dwayne Hickman and Bob Denver. The show was co-produced by Martin Manulis Productions and aired for four seasons from 1959 to 1963.

During his time at Fox, Manulis also developed a series with James A. Michener called Adventures in Paradise. The show aired on ABC from October 1959 to April 1962. Despite poor reviews, the show was popular and aired for three years. Manulis later recalled that the lead actor, Gardner McKay, though remarkably good looking, simply could not act. He joked that a dubbed version using the voice of a skilled French actor and Gardner's good looks were the perfect combination and proved to be a hit in France. A third series produced by Manulis at Fox was Five Fingers, an espionage program starring David Hedison and Luciana Paluzzi that aired on NBC from October 1959 to January 1960.

== Motion picture producer ==
After leaving Fox, Manulis spent much of the 1960s producing motion pictures for theatrical release. In December 1961, he began production of Days of Wine and Roses starring Jack Lemmon and Lee Remick and directed by Blake Edwards. Days of Wine and Roses was first produced as an episode of Playhouse 90 in the fall of 1958. Manulis's film version was released in December 1962 and received Academy Award nominations for best actor, best actress, best art direction, best costume design, and best original song. It was selected by the film critics of The New York Times as one of the 1000 best films ever made and as one of American Film Institute's best 400 films.

Other motion pictures produced by Manulis in the 1960s include Dear Heart (1964), a romantic comedy directed by Delbert Mann, and starring Glenn Ford and Geraldine Page; Luv (1967), a romantic comedy directed by Clive Donner and starring Jack Lemmon, Peter Falk and Elaine May; and Duffy (1968), a comedy starring James Coburn, James Mason and Susannah York.

== Later years ==
In 1977, Manulis was the executive producer of the television series James at 16, a coming-of-age drama starring Lance Kerwin that aired on NBC from 1977 to 1978. He produced the television miniseries, Chiefs in 1983 (starring Charlton Heston and Keith Carradine) and James Michener's Space in 1985 (starring James Garner, Beau Bridges, and Bruce Dern). From 1987 to 1989, he was the artistic director of the Ahmanson Theatre in Los Angeles.

On September 28, 2007, Manulis died of natural causes at his home in Los Angeles, at the age of 92. Manulis's son, John Bard Manulis, is a motion picture producer.

== Filmography ==
=== Television credits ===
- Casey, Crime Photographer (producer, 1951-1952)
- Suspense (producer, 1952-1953)
- Studio One Summer Theatre (producer, 1953)
- The Best of Broadway (producer, 1954-1955)
- Climax! (producer, 1955-1956)
- Playhouse 90 (producer, 1956-1958)
- The Many Loves of Dobie Gillis (producer, 1959-1963)
- Adventures in Paradise (producer, 1959-1962)
- Five Fingers (producer, 1959-1960)
- Double Solitaire (producer, 1974; TV movie)
- James at 15 (executive producer, 1977-1978)
- The Day Christ Died (producer, 1980; TV movie)
- The Fighter (executive producer, 1983; TV movie)
- Chiefs (executive producer, 1983; miniseries)
- Space (producer, 1985; miniseries)
- Harem (executive producer, 1986; TV movie)
- Grass Roots (producer, 1992; TV movie)

=== Motion picture credits ===
- Days of Wine and Roses (producer, 1962)
- Dear Heart (producer, 1964)
- Luv (producer, 1967)
- Duffy (producer, 1968)
