= Playhouse 90 =

American television series

- Genre: Anthology
- Written by: Robert Alan Aurthur; James P. Cavanagh; Horton Foote; John Gay; William Gibson; Frank D. Gilroy; Arthur Hailey; A. E. Hotchner; Ernest Kinoy; Loring Mandel; Don M. Mankiewicz; Abby Mann; J. P. Miller; Paul Monash; Tad Mosel; Reginald Rose; Rod Serling; David Shaw; Aaron Spelling; Leslie Stevens; Malvin Wald
- Directed by: John Brahm; James B. Clark; Fielder Cook; Vincent J. Donehue; John Frankenheimer; David Greene; George Roy Hill; Arthur Hiller; Herbert Hirschman; Buzz Kulik; Delbert Mann; Burgess Meredith; Robert Mulligan; James Neilson; Ralph Nelson; Arthur Penn; David Lowell Rich; Oscar Rudolph; Boris Sagal; Franklin J. Schaffner; Alex Segal; Stewart Stern; Robert Stevens; David Swift; Charles Marquis Warren; Paul Wendkos
- Theme music composer: Alex North
- Composers: Jerry Goldsmith; Robert Allen; John Williams; Robert Drasnin; Fred Steiner; Bernard Herrmann
- Country of origin: United States
- Original language: English
- No. of seasons: 4
- No. of episodes: 133 (list of episodes)

Production
- Executive producer: Peter Kortner
- Producers: Julian Claman; Martin Manulis; Herbert Brodkin
- Cinematography: Gert Andersen; Albert Kurland
- Editors: Henry Batista; Robert L. Swanson; Sam Gold; Richard K. Brockway
- Running time: 72–78 minutes
- Production companies: CBS Productions; Filmaster Productions; Screen Gems

Original release
- Network: CBS
- Release: October 4, 1956 – May 18, 1960

Playhouse 90 is an American television anthology drama series that aired on CBS from 1956 to 1960 for a total of 133 episodes. The show was produced at CBS Television City in Los Angeles, California. Since live anthology drama series of the mid-1950s usually were hour-long shows, the title highlighted the network's intention to present something unusual: a weekly series of hour-and-a-half-long dramas rather than 60-minute plays.

Playhouse 90 received many Emmy Award nominations, and it later ranked #33 on the TV Guide 50 Greatest TV Shows of All Time. In 1997, the acclaimed Requiem for a Heavyweight was ranked #30 on the TV Guide 100 Greatest Episodes of All Time. In 2013, the Writers Guild of America ranked Playhouse 90 #65 on their list of the 101 Best Written TV Series. In 2023, Variety ranked Playhouse 90 as the nineteenth-greatest TV show of all time.

== Background ==
The producers of the show were Martin Manulis, John Houseman, Russell Stoneman, Fred Coe, Arthur Penn, and Hubbell Robinson. The leading director was John Frankenheimer (27 episodes), followed by Franklin J. Schaffner (19 episodes). Other directors included Sidney Lumet, George Roy Hill, Delbert Mann, and Robert Mulligan.

With Alex North's opening theme music, the series debuted October 4, 1956, with Rod Serling's adaptation of Pat Frank's novel Forbidden Area starring Charlton Heston. The following week, Requiem for a Heavyweight, also scripted by Serling, received critical accolades and later dominated the 1956 Emmys by winning awards in six categories, including best direction, best teleplay and best actor. Serling was given the first Peabody Award for television writing. For many viewers, live television drama had moved to a loftier plateau. Playhouse 90 established a reputation as television's most distinguished anthology drama series and maintained a high standard for four seasons (with repeats in 1961).

From the start, productions were planned to be both live and filmed, with a filmed show every fourth Thursday to relieve the pressure of mounting the live telecasts. The first filmed Playhouse 90 was The Country Husband (November 1, 1956) with Barbara Hale and Frank Lovejoy portraying a couple in a collapsing marriage. The filmed episodes were produced variously, by Screen Gems and CBS.

The ambitious series frequently featured critically acclaimed dramas, including the original television versions of The Miracle Worker (with Teresa Wright as Annie Sullivan), Helen Morgan (with an Emmy to Polly Bergen for her performance in the title role), In the Presence of Mine Enemies (Rod Serling's Warsaw Ghetto drama starring Charles Laughton, with Robert Redford in an early role), and Judgment at Nuremberg, featuring Maximilian Schell, Werner Klemperer, Torben Meyer and Otto Waldis in the roles they would repeat in the 1961 film, but with an otherwise different cast, including Claude Rains in the Spencer Tracy role and Paul Lukas in the Burt Lancaster role.

Early on, in 1956, Playhouse 90 faced some controversy due to scheduling. It was thought by independent producers that, in Playhouse 90's procurement, scheduling, and promotion decisions, major networks favored programs that they produced or, in which they had ownership interest. Worried about this issue, CBS suspended its plans for the series in fear that they had violated antitrust laws. Soon afterward, however, CBS received an oral opinion from its legal counsel that no laws had been violated, and the show continued.

== Writers ==
Writers for the series included Robert Alan Aurthur, Rod Serling, Whitfield Cook, David E. Durston, Sumner Locke Elliott, Horton Foote, Frank D. Gilroy, Roger O. Hirson, A. E. Hotchner, Loring Mandel, Abby Mann, J. P. Miller, Jack E. Miller, Paul Monash, and Leslie Stevens. Playwright Tad Mosel, who wrote four teleplays for Playhouse 90, recalled, "My first Playhouse 90 was Glamour... Glamour had come to television because CBS had built this magnificent Television City in Los Angeles... Television had come to deserve buildings for itself. This was a whole new idea, that you'd have a building for television. Playhouse 90 was one of the first shows to go into that mammoth building."

== John Frankenheimer ==
Between 1954 and 1960, John Frankenheimer directed 152 live television dramas, an average of one every two weeks. During the 1950s he was regarded as television's top directorial talent and much of his significant work was for Playhouse 90, for which he directed 27 teleplays between 1956 and 1960. He began with Forbidden Area (October 4, 1956), adapted by Serling from the Pat Frank novel about Soviet sabotage, following with Rendezvous in Black (October 25, 1956), adapted from Cornell Woolrich's novel of twisted revenge; Eloise (November 22, 1956), adapted from the book by Kay Thompson and Hilary Knight; and The Family Nobody Wanted (December 20, 1956), from the Helen Doss book about a childless couple who adopt a dozen children of mixed ancestry, a book brought to television again in 1975.

As Playhouse 90 moved into 1957, Frankenheimer directed a science fiction drama, The Ninth Day (January 10, 1957), by Howard and Dorothy Baker, about a small group of World War III survivors, and a Serling adaptation, The Comedian (February 14, 1957), based on the short story by Ernest Lehman, and starring Mickey Rooney as an abrasive, manipulative television comedian. In later interviews, Frankenheimer expressed his admiration for Rooney's acting in this memorable drama. A kinescope of The Comedian survives and remains available for viewing at the Paley Center for Media in New York City and Los Angeles.

After The Last Tycoon (March 14, 1957), adapted from the F. Scott Fitzgerald novel about a film studio head, Frankenheimer followed with Tad Mosel's If You Knew Elizabeth (April 11, 1957) about an ambitious college professor; another Fitzgerald adaptation, Winter Dreams (May 23, 1957), dramatizing a romantic triangle; Clash by Night (June 13, 1957), with Kim Stanley in an adaptation of the Clifford Odets play; and The Fabulous Irishman (June 27, 1957), a biographical drama tracing events in the life of Robert Briscoe. Frankenheimer used a fake bull's head jutting into the frame when he staged The Death of Manolete (September 12, 1957), Barnaby Conrad's drama about the death of the legendary bullfighter, a production later ranked by Frankenheimer as one of his worst.

Robert Alan Aurthur's script for A Sound of Different Drummers (October 3, 1957) borrowed so heavily from Ray Bradbury's Fahrenheit 451 that Bradbury sued. The Troublemakers (November 21, 1957) was George Bellak's adaptation of his own 1956 play about a campus newspaper editor killed by other students. Frankenheimer ended the year with The Thundering Wave (December 12, 1957), starring James and Pamela Mason in an Aurthur drama about an acting couple who agree to do a play together despite their separation.

Frankenheimer kicked off 1958 with The Last Man (January 9, 1958), an Aaron Spelling revenge drama, followed by The Violent Heart (February 6, 1958) from the Daphne du Maurier story of romance on the French Riviera, Rumors of Evening (May 1, 1958) about a World War II pilot obsessed with a USO entertainer, and Serling's Bomber's Moon (May 22, 1958) about a World War II pilot accused of cowardice. A Town Has Turned to Dust (June 19, 1958), a Serling drama about an 1870 lynching of an innocent Mexican in a southwestern town, was based on the Emmett Till case.

Note that the ad for this repeat, a production adapted from William Faulkner's story, makes no mention of Faulkner

In The New York Times for October 3, 1958, the day after J. P. Miller's Days of Wine and Roses was telecast, Jack Gould wrote a rave review with much praise for the writer, director and cast:

It was a brilliant and compelling work... Mr. Miller's dialogue was especially fine, natural, vivid and understated. Miss Laurie's performance was enough to make the flesh crawl, yet it also always elicited deep sympathy. Her interpretation of the young wife just a shade this side of delirium tremens—the flighty dancing around the room, her weakness of character and moments of anxiety and her charm when she was sober—was a superlative accomplishment. Miss Laurie is moving into the forefront of our most gifted young actresses. Mr. Robertson achieved first-rate contrast between the sober man fighting to hold on and the hopeless drunk whose only courage came from the bottle. His scene in the greenhouse, where he tried to find the bottle that he had hidden in the flower pot, was particularly good... John Frankenheimer's direction was magnificent. His every touch implemented the emotional suspense but he never let the proceedings get out of hand or merely become sensational.

Old Man (November 20, 1958) was adapted by Horton Foote from William Faulkner's story set during the 1927 Mississippi River flood. Face of a Hero (January 1, 1959), based on the Pierre Boulle novel, starred Jack Lemmon, who took this play to Broadway for a run of 36 performances during October to November 1960. The following year, Frankenheimer began with The Blue Men (January 15, 1959), an Alvin Boretz drama about the trial of a police detective who refused to make an arrest. A. E. Hotchner adapted Ernest Hemingway's For Whom the Bell Tolls into a two-part format (March 12 and March 19, 1959). Journey to the Day (April 22, 1960) was a Roger Hirson drama about group therapy.

== Live to tape ==
Playhouse 90 began as a live series, making a transition to tape in 1957. Kevin Dowler, writing for the Museum of Broadcast Communications, noted:

Its status as a "live" drama was short lived in any case, since the difficulties in mounting a 90-minute production on a weekly basis required the adoption of the recently-developed videotape technology, which was used to record entire shows beforehand from 1957 onward. Both the pressures and the costs of this ambitious production eventually resulted in Playhouse 90 being cut back to alternate weeks, sharing its time slot with The Big Party between 1959 and 1960.

The final eight shows were aired irregularly between February and May 1960, with repeats broadcast during the summer weeks of 1961...

The success of Playhouse 90 continued into the 1957-58 season with productions of The Miracle Worker, The Comedian, and The Helen Morgan Story. Although these shows, along with Requiem and Judgment at Nuremberg, were enough to ensure the historical importance of Playhouse 90, the program also stood out because of its emergence in the "film era" of television broadcasting evolution.

By 1956, much of television production had moved from the east to the west coast, and from live performances to filmed series. Most of the drama anthologies, a staple of the evening schedule to this point, fell victim to the newer types of programs being developed. Playhouse 90 stands in contrast to the prevailing trend, and its reputation benefited from both the growing nostalgia for the waning live period, and a universal distaste for Hollywood on the part of New York television critics. It also is probable that since the use of videotape (not widespread at the time) preserved a "live" feel, so that discussion of the programs could be easily adapted to the standards introduced by the New York television critics.

Normally, the program was telecast in black-and-white, but on Christmas night, 1958, it offered a color production of Tchaikovsky's The Nutcracker, starring the New York City Ballet and choreographed by George Balanchine. The program (hosted by June Lockhart) was presented live, rather than on videotape, however, and it was long thought to have survived only on a black-and-white kinescope version. In 2021, the color videotape version was uploaded to YouTube.

== Episodes ==
Season	Episodes	Originally released		Day / Time
Season	Episodes	First released	Last released	Day / Time
1	39	October 4, 1956	June 27, 1957	Thursday, 9:30 p.m. ET
2	40	September 12, 1957	August 7, 1958	Thursday, 9:30 p.m. ET
3	38	September 25, 1958	June 25, 1959	Thursday, 9:30 p.m. ET
4	16	October 1, 1959	May 18, 1960	Thursday at 9:30 pm (October 1, 1959 - January 21, 1960); Tuesday at 9:30 pm (February 9, 1960; March 22, 1960); Wednesday at 8:00 pm (February 24, 1960; May 18, 1960); Monday at 9:30 pm (March 7, 1960; May 2, 1960); Sunday at 9:30 pm (April 3, 1960); Friday at 9:30 pm (April 22, 1960)

== Source for films ==
Several teleplays in the series were filmed later as theatrical motion pictures, including Requiem for a Heavyweight, Days of Wine and Roses, and Judgment at Nuremberg. Seven Against the Wall was written by Howard Browne, who later reworked his teleplay into the screenplay for Roger Corman's 1967 movie, The St. Valentine's Day Massacre. Three of the actors in the Playhouse 90 production reprised their roles for the Corman film: Celia Lovsky, Milton Frome, and Frank Silvera.

An indifferently received television movie production of In the Presence of Mine Enemies, starring Armin Mueller-Stahl in the Charles Laughton role, was shown on cable television in 1997 by Showtime.

== Attempted revival ==
In 1991, film director Francis Ford Coppola was planning a revival of the show called Playhouse '90s. It was initially set to air in spring 1992 with Coppola directing the first teleplay "Top of the Ninth", centering on live baseball. By 1994, it was reported that after years of development limbo, CBS would air "Top of the Ninth" on a Sunday in April, though this never occurred. Spike Lee and Jules Feiffer had also written and were going to direct future episodes.

== Awards ==
When CBS ran this ad, illustrated by Hilary Knight, in newspapers on November 22, 1956, the network intentionally removed the name of lead actress Evelyn Rudie, who received an Emmy nomination for her performance as Eloise

Peabody Awards

- 1957 Rod Serling for Requiem for a Heavyweight
- 1959 Playhouse 90

Golden Globe Awards

- 1957 Best TV Show – Playhouse 90
- 1958 Best Dramatic Anthology Series – Playhouse 90

Emmy Awards

- 1957 Best New Program Series – Playhouse 90
- 1957 Best Art Direction - One Hour or More – Albert Heschong for "Requiem for a Heavyweight"
- 1957 Best Single Performance by an Actor – Jack Palance in "Requiem for a Heavyweight"
- 1957 Best Single Program of the Year – "Requiem for a Heavyweight"
- 1957 Best Teleplay Writing - One Hour or More – Rod Serling for "Requiem for a Heavyweight"
- 1957 Best Director - One Hour or More – Ralph Nelson for "Requiem for a Heavyweight"
- 1958 Best Single Performance by an Actress – Polly Bergen in "The Helen Morgan Story"
- 1958 Best Single Program of the Year – "The Comedian"
- 1958 Best Teleplay Writing - One Hour or More – Rod Serling for "The Comedian"
- 1959 Best Dramatic Series - One Hour or Longer – Playhouse 90
- 1960 Outstanding Program Achievement in the Field of Drama – Playhouse 90
