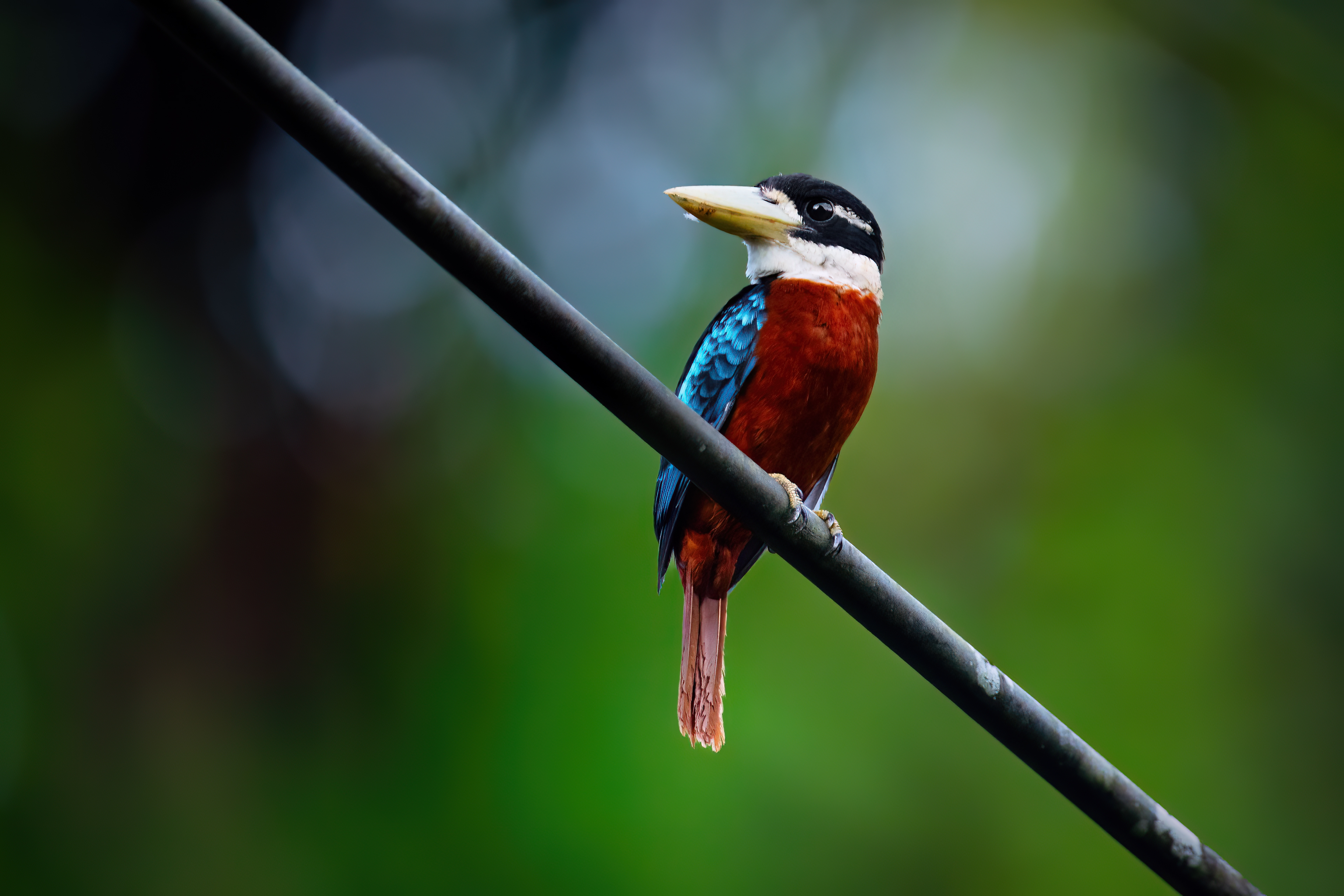

Conservation status
- Least Concern (IUCN 3.1)

Scientific classification
- Kingdom: Animalia
- Phylum: Chordata
- Class: Aves
- Order: Coraciiformes
- Family: Alcedinidae
- Subfamily: Halcyoninae
- Genus: Dacelo
- Species: D. gaudichaud

Binomial name
- Dacelo gaudichaud Gaimard, 1823

= Rufous-bellied kookaburra =

Species of bird

The rufous-bellied kookaburra (Dacelo gaudichaud), originally known as Gaudichaud's kookaburra after French botanist Charles Gaudichaud-Beaupré, is a species of kookaburra that is widely distributed through the forests of lowland New Guinea.

It has a black cap, blue-tinged wings, and a pale, rufous belly and tail feathers, but its white bill distinguishes it very clearly from other kookaburras with their black bills. Juveniles, however, have a dark-grey bill. Like the blue-winged kookaburra, the sexes can be distinguished by the colour of the tail feathers, blue in males and rufous in females and immature birds. Rufous-bellied kookaburras are smaller than other kookaburra species at around 143 g (5.0 oz) as against the laughing kookaburra's 335 g (11.8 oz) and about 28 cm (11.0 in) as against the laughing kookaburra's 46 cm (18.1 in). Despite this major size difference, the rufous-bellied kookaburra has been known to form (infertile) hybrids with all other kookaburra species, though available genetic studies suggest it is clearly the most distant of the four.

This kookaburra is unusual in that it occupies dense rainforests (as opposed to the open country preferred by other kookaburras) and does not live in cooperative breeding family groups, but singly, or when breeding, in pairs. Rufous-bellied kookaburras can be found in the middle story of the tropical rainforest, where they fly out directly and swiftly from their perch to seize large insects from trees. Despite their direct flight, rufous-bellied kookaburras are capable of very sharp twists and turns around the dense trees that form their habitat. They have been known also to hunt small vertebrates, but do so less frequently than the larger woodland kookaburras, and frequently are mobbed by smaller birds when they prey on their eggs or nestlings. Males are very aggressive in defending their territories, which average 2 to 2.5 ha (4.9 to 6.2 acres) in size, and sometimes fight intruders violently.

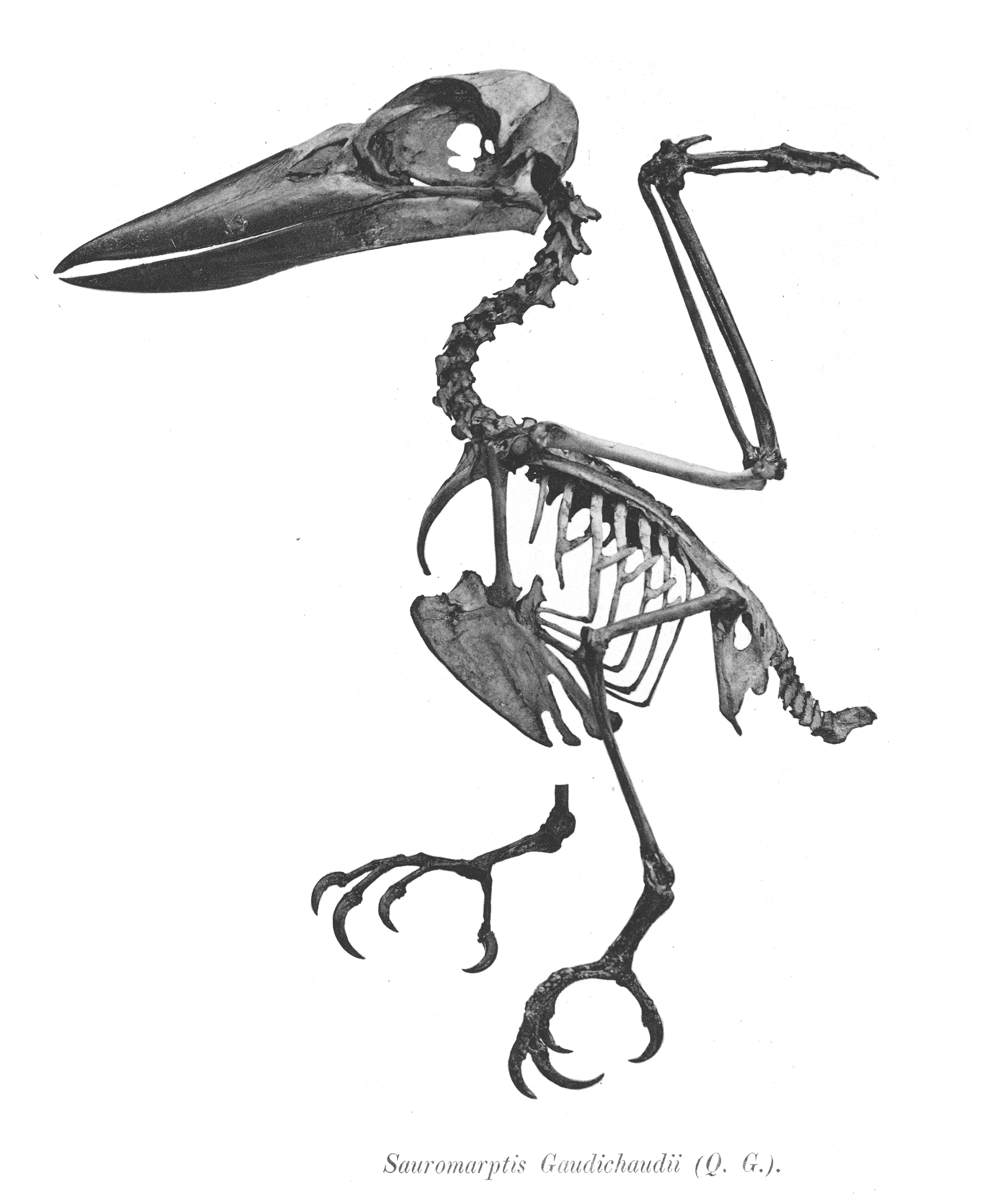
Skeleton

Like their larger relatives, rufous-bellied kookaburras breed in termite mounds. Breeding usually takes place from May to October, though the young do not disperse fully until February, and pairs have not been known to attempt a second brood in one year. Two white eggs are laid, though the actual incubation period is not known.
