= Misalliance =

Misalliance may refer to:

- Misalliance (play), a play by Bernard Shaw
  - Misalliance (1954 film), BBC television film adaptation
  - Misalliance (Playhouse 90), a US television play based on Shaw's work
- Mésalliance, a marriage to an unsuitable partner
