= The Grey Nurse Said Nothing =

- Playhouse 90 episode
- Episode no.: Season 4 Episode 5
- Directed by: Ron Winston
- Teleplay by: Sumner Locke Elliott
- Original air date: 26 November 1959
- Running time: 90 minutes

Episode chronology
← Previous "The Hidden Image"	Next → "The Tunnel"

"The Grey Nurse Said Nothing" is a television play written by Sumner Locke Elliott. It was based on elements of the Shark Arm case but is mostly fictitious. The play was screened in the US in 1959 as an episode of Playhouse 90. It was performed on American and Australian television.

== Plot ==
A shark is captured and throws up an identifiable human arm, with a tattoo. It is presumed the arm belongs to a boatman. A local tycoon is arrested for murder.

Witnesses at the trial include the tycoon's alcoholic wife, whom the boatman tried to seduce, and a local school teacher in love with the boatman.

== Cast ==
- Ann Todd as Laura Mills
- Angela Lansbury as Hazel Wills
- Paul Comi as Patrick Aherne
- Gary Crutcher as Lynch mob leader
- Patricia Cutts as Mavis Greenop
- Michael David as Herbert Wills
- Don Dubbins as Bluey
- Hugh Griffith as Rev. Light
- Tony Haig as Boy
- Reg Lye
- Ric Hutton

== Production ==
The play was set in Australia, a location that was uncommon on American TV at the time.

The show had a cast of 120. Sumner Locke Elliot provided the sounds of a Kookaburra because none were available; he imitated one in the studio.

== Reception ==
The Los Angeles Times called it a "suspenseful telecast" in which the cast "gave universally good performances."

The Chicago Daily Tribune called it "thoroughly enjoyable".
