= The Sounds of Eden =

- Playhouse 90 episode
- Episode no.: Season 4 Episode 2
- Directed by: Buzz Kulik
- Written by: George Bellak
- Original air date: October 15, 1959

Guest appearances
- James Whitmore; Kim Hunter; Henry Jones; Everett Sloane; Martin Landau; Dick Foran

Episode chronology
← Previous "Target for Three"	Next → "Misalliance"

"The Sounds of Eden" was an American television play broadcast live on October 15, 1959, as part of the CBS television series, Playhouse 90. It was the second episode of the fourth season of Playhouse 90 and the 119th episode overall.

== Plot ==
The kidnapping of a wealthy Texas oil man is depicted in a "semi-documentary" style from differing points of view. After the ransom is paid and the oil man is freed, he provides clues to assist investigators in locating the kidnappers. The play was loosely based on the kidnapping of Charles F. Urschel.

== Cast ==
- James Whitmore as Phillip Anderson, a Texas oil man
- Kim Hunter as Mrs. Anderson
- Henry Jones as Jess Brown
- Everett Sloane as Lawson
- Martin Landau as MacCormick
- Dick Foran as Brady.

== Production ==
John Houseman was the producer, and Buzz Kulik was the director. George Bellak wrote the teleplay.

== Reception ==
In The New York Times, John P. Shanley called it "skillfully produced," "effectively acted", and "an absorbing account".
