= The Hidden Image =

- Playhouse 90 episode
- Episode no.: Season 4 Episode 4
- Written by: David Karp
- Original air date: November 12, 1959

Guest appearances
- Franchot Tone; Martin Gabel; Nancy Marchand; George Grizzard; Frank Maxwell

Episode chronology
← Previous "Misalliance"	Next → "The Grey Nurse Said Nothing"

"The Hidden Image" is an American television play broadcast live on November 12, 1959, as part of the CBS television series, Playhouse 90. It is the fourth episode of the fourth season of Playhouse 90 and the 121st episode overall.

== Plot ==
The plot concerns the pressures of modern politics as shown through a corruption investigation into a politician of the highest integrity.

== Cast ==
- Franchot Tone as Avery Yarbrough
- Martin Gabel as George Barrow
- Nancy Marchand as Mrs. Yarbrough
- George Grizzard as Leo Portnoy
- Frank Maxwell as Tommy Atwell

== Production ==
John Houseman was the producer. David Karp wrote the teleplay'.

== Reception ==
Fred Danzig of the UPI called it a play of "uncanny timeliness", though he concluded that the writer had "cluttered his story with too many gimmicks, inconsistencies and contrived situations."

In The New York Times, John P. Shanley found it "bland and only intermittently interesting."
