= The Second Happiest Day =

- Playhouse 90 episode
- Tony Randall and Margaret O'Brien in "The Second Happiest Day"
- Episode no.: Season 3 Episode 38
- Directed by: Ralph Nelson
- Written by: Steven Gethers (adaptation); John Phillips (novel)
- Original air date: June 25, 1959

Guest appearances
- Tony Randall as Gus Taylor; Margaret O'Brien as Lila Norris; Fay Wray as Tula Marsh

Episode chronology
← Previous "Dark as the Night"	Next → "Target for Three"

"The Second Happiest Day" is an American television play broadcast on June 25, 1959 as part of the CBS television series, Playhouse 90.

== Plot ==
Gus Taylor, the editor of a fashion magazine rehearses his wedding to Lila Norris. Gus learns that his best friend George has shot himself and leaves the rehearsal. He recalls his college days with George after serving in the Korean War. By the time Gus arrives, George has died. He returns to his wedding ceremony.

== Cast ==
Bob Cummings hosted the broadcast. The cast includes the following.

- Tony Randall as Gus Taylor
- Margaret O'Brien as Lila Norris
- Fay Wray as Tula Marsh
- Jack Mullaney as Charles "Cuppy" Vale
- Judith Anderson as Ava Norris
- John Lupton as George Marsh III

== Production ==
The program was broadcast on June 25, 1959 as the final episode in the third season of the CBS television series, Playhouse 90. Peter Kortner was the producer and Ralph Nelson the director. Steven Gethers wrote the teleplay based on the novel by John Phillips.
