= Dark as the Night =

- Playhouse 90 episode
- Episode no.: Season 3 Episode 37
- Directed by: Terence Young
- Written by: Marc Brandel (adaptation), James Hadley Chase (story)
- Original air date: June 18, 1959

Episode chronology
← Previous "Project Immortality"	Next → "The Second Happiest Day"

"Dark as the Night" is an American television film broadcast on June 18, 1959 as part of the CBS television series, Playhouse 90. The cast includes Laraine Day and Michael Wilding.

== Plot ==
An English lawyer runs for Parliament and his American wife decides to leave him at the height of the campaign. A London gossip columnist blackmails the lawyer after discovering an attractive jewel thief in the lawyer's house. The drama climaxes after the woman disappears.

== Cast ==
- Laraine Day as Lauren Hughes
- Michael Wilding as Chris Hughes
- Dennis Price as Percy
- Sheila Allen as Iris
- Michael Hordern as Griffith
- Bill Owen as Peters
- Hermione Baddeley as Rose
- Sydney Tafler as Club Manager
- Marianne Stone as Ellen
- Ronald Allen as Tommy

== Production ==
The program was filmed in London, the first episode of Playhouse 90 produced outside the United States. It aired on June 18, 1959, on the CBS television network. Terence Young was the director and Nicole Milinair the producer. Marc Brandel wrote the teleplay as an adaptation of the story by James Hadley Chase.
