= Target for Three =

- Playhouse 90 episode
- Episode no.: Season 4 Episode 1
- Directed by: Robert Stevens
- Written by: David Davidson
- Original air date: October 1, 1959

Guest appearances
- Ricardo Montalbán; George C. Scott; Pedro Armendariz; Marisa Pavan; Liliane Montevecchi

Episode chronology
← Previous "The Second Happiest Day"	Next → "The Sounds of Eden"

"Target for Three" was an American television play broadcast live on October 1, 1959, as part of the CBS television series, Playhouse 90. It was the first episode of the fourth season of Playhouse 90 and the 118th episode overall.

== Plot ==
Set in an unspecified South American country, the play follows three rebels who are assigned with the task of assassinating their country's brutal dictator, Montez.

== Cast ==
- Ricardo Montalbán as Vincente
- George C. Scott as Juan
- Pedro Armendariz as Montez, the dictator
- Marisa Pavan as Consuelo, Montez's daughter
- Liliane Montevecchi as Estrella

== Production ==
John Houseman was the producer. Robert Stevens directed, and David Davidson wrote the screenplay.

== Reception ==
The production received a positive review from Jack Gould of The New York Times. Fred Danzig praised the acting of Montalbán and Armendariz and opined that the production "misses the bull's eye but wins a cigar for coming close." The Associated Press television critic Cynthia Lowry also praised the cast's performances.
