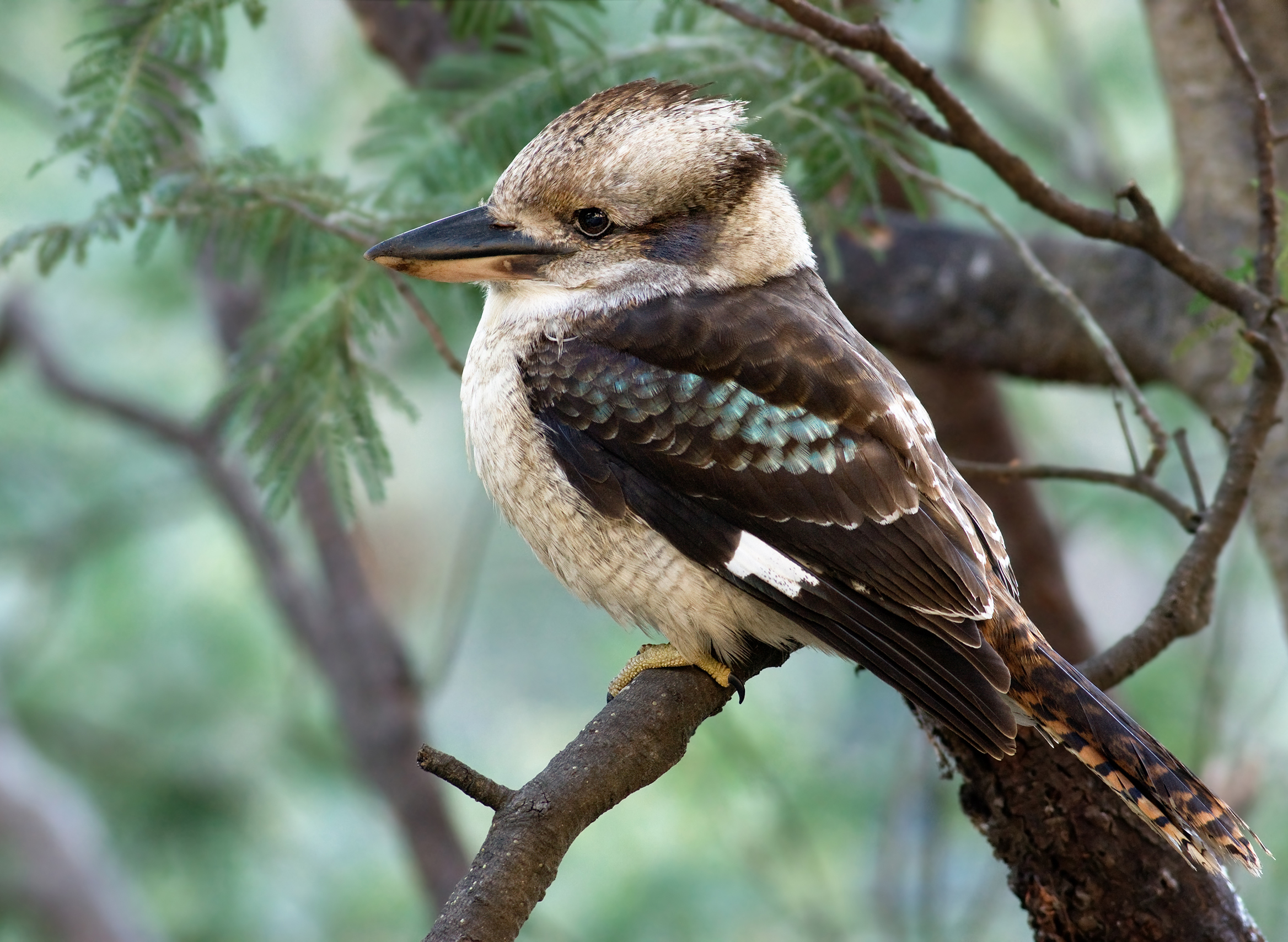
- Laughing kookaburra in Tasmania, Australia

Scientific classification
- Kingdom: Animalia
- Phylum: Chordata
- Class: Aves
- Order: Coraciiformes
- Family: Alcedinidae
- Subfamily: Halcyoninae
- Genus: Dacelo; Leach, 1815

Type species
- Alcedo gigantea Hermann, 1783

Species
- Dacelo gaudichaud; Dacelo leachii; Dacelo novaeguineae; Dacelo rex; Dacelo tyro

Audio
- Laughing kookaburra recorded in south Western Australia

= Kookaburra =

Genus of birds (terrestrial tree kingfishers)

Phylogeny

- Dacelo
  - - Spangled kookaburra
    - Shovel-billed kookaburra (Clytoceyx rex)
  - - Rufous-bellied kookaburra
    - - Laughing kookaburra
      - Blue-winged kookaburra

Cladogram based on the molecular analysis by Andersen and colleagues published in 2017.

Kookaburras (pronounced /ˈkʊkəbʌrə/ KUU-kə-buh-rə) are terrestrial tree kingfishers of the genus Dacelo native to Australia and New Guinea, which grow to between 28 and 47 cm (11 and 19 in) in length and weigh around 300 g (11 oz). The name is a loanword from Wiradjuri guuguubarra, onomatopoeic of its call. The loud, distinctive call of the laughing kookaburra is widely used as a stock sound effect in situations that involve an Australian bush setting or tropical jungle, especially in older movies.

They are found in habitats ranging from humid forest to arid savannah, as well as in suburban areas with tall trees or near running water. Though they are a species of kingfisher, kookaburras are not closely associated with water.

== Taxonomy ==
The genus Dacelo was introduced by English zoologist William Elford Leach in 1815. The type species is the laughing kookaburra. The name Dacelo is an anagram of alcedo, the Latin word for a kingfisher. A molecular study published in 2017 found that the genus Dacelo, as then defined, was paraphyletic. The shovel-billed kookaburra was previously classified in the monotypic genus Clytoceyx, but was reclassified into Dacelo based on phylogenetic evidence.

== Classification and species ==
Five species of kookaburra can be found in Australia, New Guinea, and the Aru Islands:

Genus Dacelo – Leach, 1815 – five species
Common name	Scientific name and subspecies	Range	Size and ecology	IUCN status and estimated population
Shovel-billed kookaburra	Dacelo rex (Sharpe, 1880)	upland New Guinea	Size: 33 cm (13 in) long Habitat: Diet:	LC
Spangled kookaburra	Dacelo tyro Gray, 1858 Two subspecies: D. t. archboldi (Rand, 1938); D. t. tyro (Gray, 1858)	Aru Islands, southern New Guinea	Size: 33 cm (13 in) long Habitat: Diet:	LC
Rufous-bellied kookaburra	Dacelo gaudichaud (Gaimard, 1823)	lowland New Guinea	Size: Habitat: Diet:	LC
Laughing kookaburra	Dacelo novaeguineae (Hermann, 1783) Two subspecies: D. n. novaeguineae (Hermann, 1783); D. n. minor (Robinson, 1900)	native to eastern Australia, introduced to southwest	Size: Habitat: Diet:	LC
Blue-winged kookaburra	Dacelo leachii (Vigors & Horsfield, 1827) Five subspecies: D. l. leachii (Vigors & Horsfield, 1827); D. l. cervina (Gould, 1838); D. l. occidentalis (Gould, 1870); D. l. intermedia (Salvadori, 1876); D. l. superflua (Mathews, 1918)	northern Australia, southern New Guinea	Size: Habitat: Diet:	LC

The laughing and blue-winged species are direct competitors in the area where their ranges now overlap. This suggests that these two species evolved in isolation, possibly during a period when Australia and New Guinea were more distant.

The blue-winged and the rufous-bellied kookaburra are sexually dimorphic, where males have blue tails and females have reddish-brown tails.

== Behaviour ==
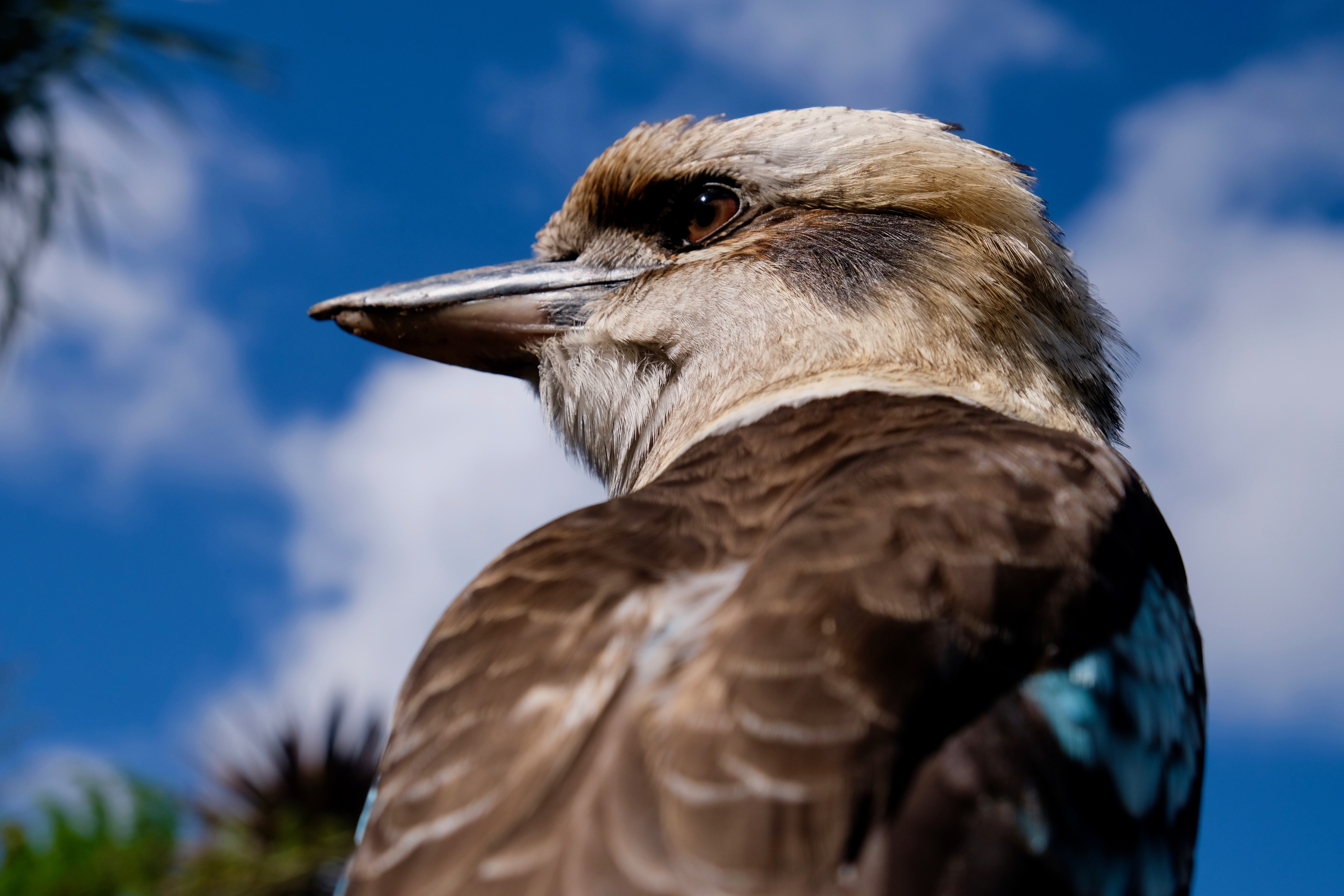
Close-up of a kookaburra in Sydney, Australia

=== Hunting ===
Kookaburras are usually seen waiting for their prey on powerlines or low tree branches. When they see their prey, they dive down and grab them with their strong beak. If the prey is small, it will be eaten whole, but if the prey is larger, then the kookaburra bashes it against a tree or the ground to make it softer and easier to eat.

They are territorial, except for the rufous-bellied, which often live with their young from the previous season. They often sing as a chorus to mark their territory.

=== Diet ===
Kookaburras are almost exclusively carnivorous, eating lizards, snakes, frogs, rodents, beetles, worms, bugs, and the young of other birds. Unlike many other kingfishers, they rarely eat fish, although they have been known to take goldfish from garden ponds. In zoos, they are usually fed food suitable for birds of prey.

Although most birds will accept handouts and take meat from barbecues, feeding kookaburras ground beef or pet food is not advised, because they do not include enough calcium and roughage.

=== Habitat ===
They live in sclerophyll woodland and open forests, in almost any area with trees large enough to hold the nests and open patches with hunting areas. The kookaburras are declining in population because of predators, lack of prey, and the environment.

== Conservation ==
All kookaburra species are listed as least concern. Australian law protects native birds, including kookaburras.

== In popular culture ==
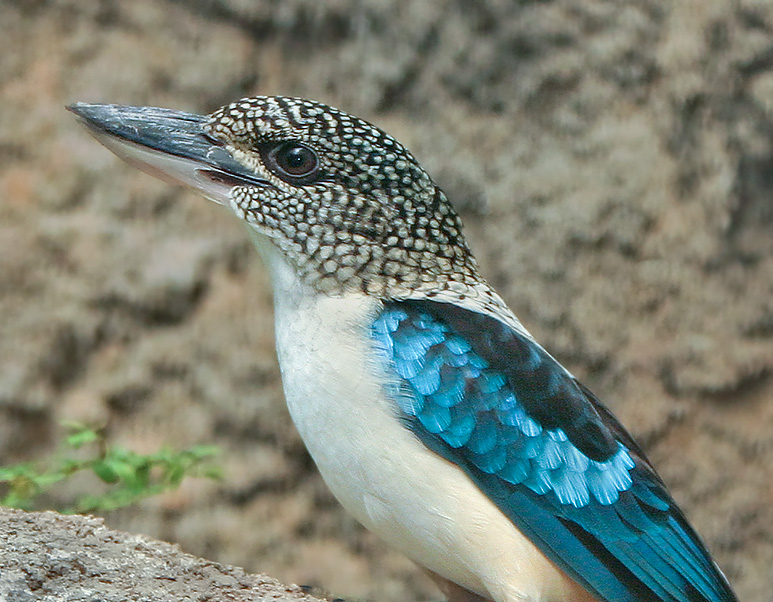
Spangled kookaburra

The distinctive sound of the laughing kookaburra's call resembles human laughter, is widely used in filmmaking and television productions, as well as certain Disney theme-park attractions, regardless of African, Asian, or South American jungle settings. Kookaburras have also appeared in several video games, including (Lineage II, Battletoads, and World of Warcraft). The children's television series Splatalot! includes an Australian character called "Kookaburra" (or "Kook"), whose costume includes decorative wings that recall the bird's plumage, and who is noted for his distinctive, high-pitched laugh. Olly the Kookaburra was one of the three mascots chosen for the 2000 Summer Olympics in Sydney. The other mascots were Millie the Echidna and Syd the Platypus. The call of a kookaburra nicknamed "Jacko" was for many years used as the morning opening theme by ABC radio stations, and for Radio Australia's overseas broadcasts.

=== Book ===
- The opening theme from ABC was the basis for a children's book by Brooke Nicholls titled Jacko, the Broadcasting Kookaburra — His Life and Adventures.
- In William Arden's 1969 book, The Mystery of the Laughing Shadow (one of the Three Investigators series for young readers), the laughing kookaburra is integral to the plot.

=== Film ===
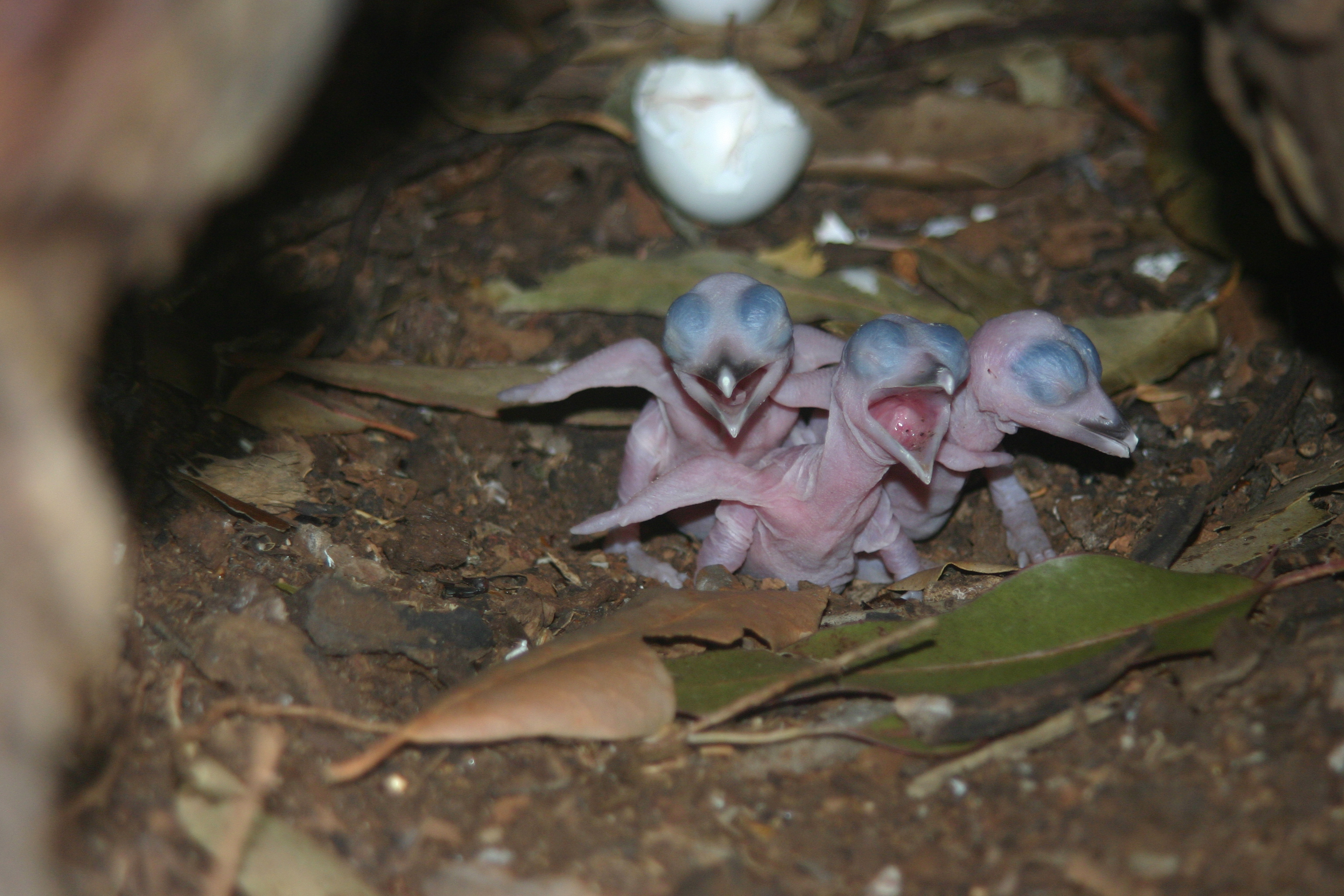
Three newly hatched kookaburra chicks

- Heard in some of the early Johnny Weissmuller films, the first occurrence was in Tarzan and the Green Goddess (1938).
- The call is heard in The Wizard of Oz (1939), The Treasure of the Sierra Madre (1948), Swiss Family Robinson (1960), Cape Fear (1962), The Lost World: Jurassic Park, and other films.
- The dolphin call in the television series Flipper (1964-7) is a modified kookaburra call.

=== Music ===
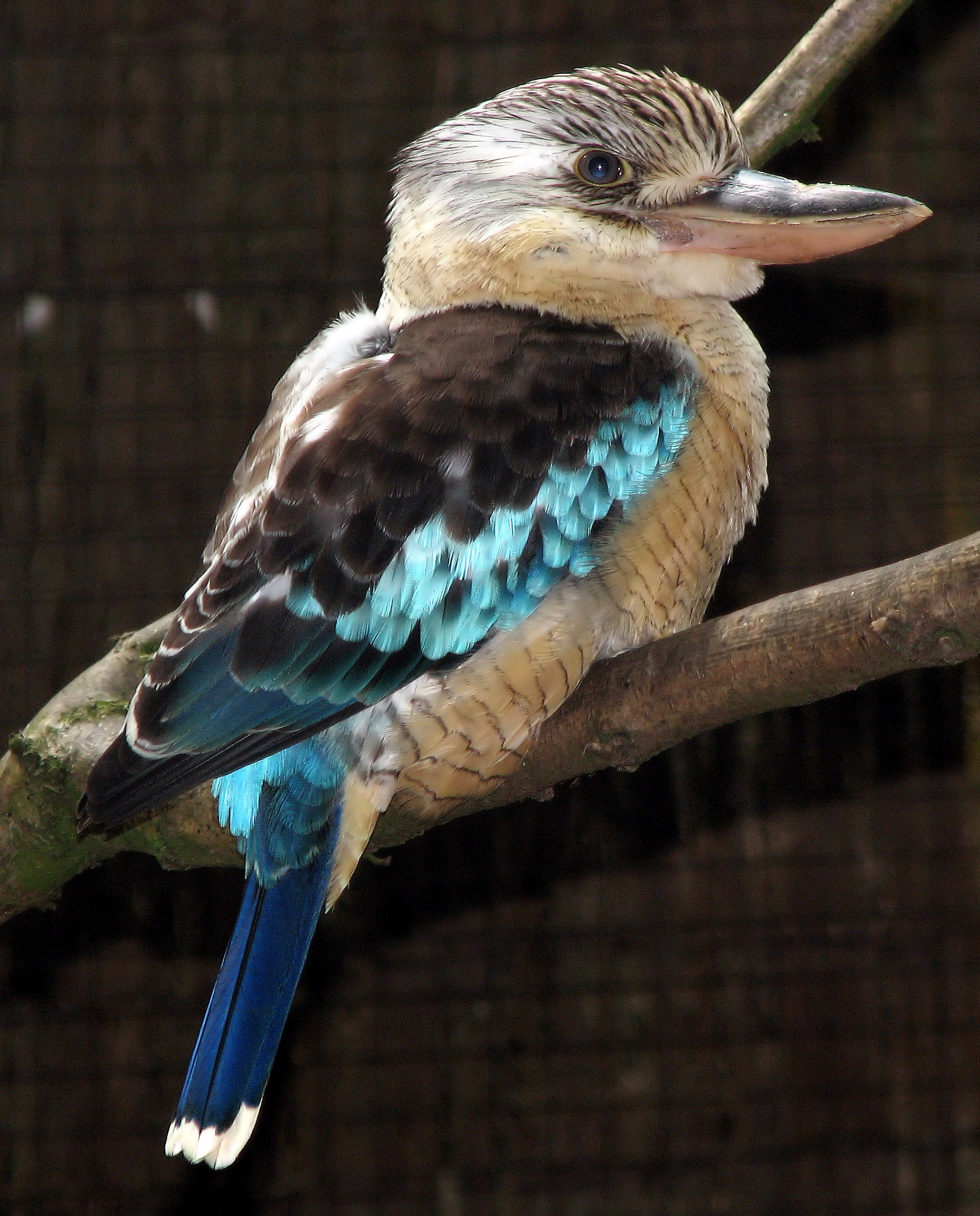
A male blue-winged kookaburra

- "Kookaburra [sits in the old gum tree]", a well-known children's song, was written in 1932 by Marion Sinclair.

=== Postage stamps ===
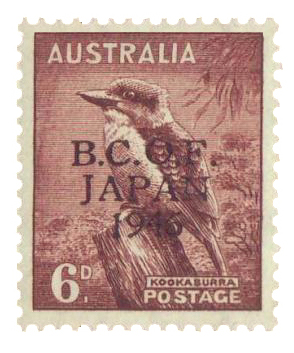
B.C.O.F. kookaburra stamp first issued in 1946.

- A six-pence (equivalent to $3.32 in 2022) stamp was issued in 1914.
- A three-pence (equivalent to $1.14 in 2022) commemorative Australian stamp was issued for the 1928 Melbourne International Philatelic Exhibition.
- A six-pence (equivalent to $2.74 in 2022) stamp was issued in 1932.
- A 38¢ (equivalent to $0.84 in 2022) Australian stamp issued in 1990 features a pair of kookaburras.
- An international $1.70 (equivalent to $2.09 in 2022) Australian stamp featuring an illustrated kookaburra was released in 2013.
- A $1.10 (equivalent to $1.21 in 2022) laughing kookaburra stamp issued in 2020.

=== Money ===
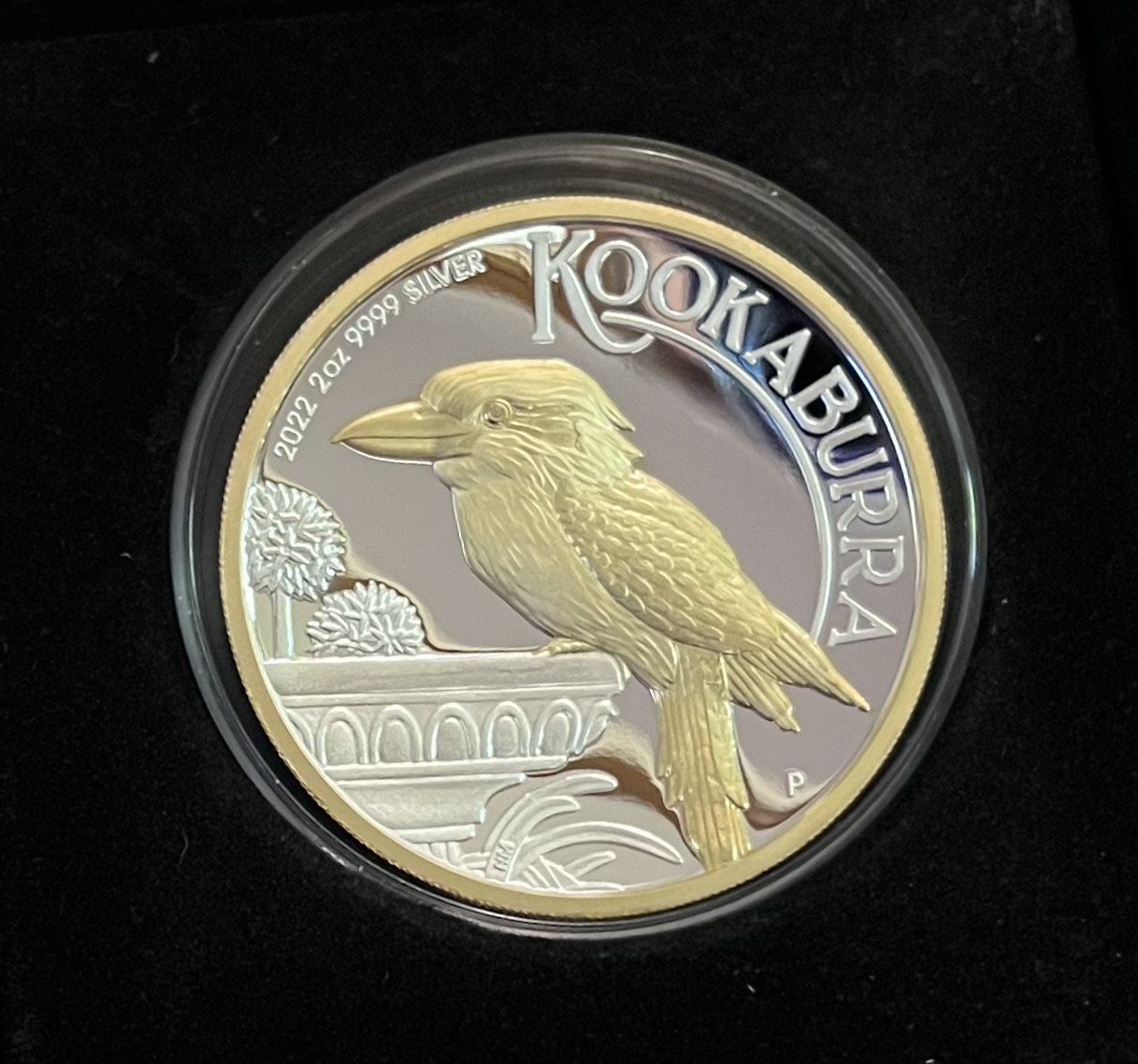
Reverse of two ounce high relief Kookaburra proof coin from the Perth mint

- An Australian coin known as the Silver Kookaburra has been minted annually since 1990.
- The kookaburra is featured multiple times on the Australian twenty-dollar note.

=== Usage across sport ===
- The Australian 12-m yacht Kookaburra III lost the America's Cup in 1987.
- The Australia men's national field hockey team is nicknamed after the kookaburra. They were world champions in field hockey in 1986, 2010 and 2014.
- Australian sports equipment company Kookaburra Sport is named after the bird.

== Bibliography ==
- Brooke Nicholls (1933). Jacko—The Broadcasting Kookaburra: His Life and Adventures. Illustrations: Dorothy Wall. Sydney: Angus & Robertson. OCLC 179238734.
