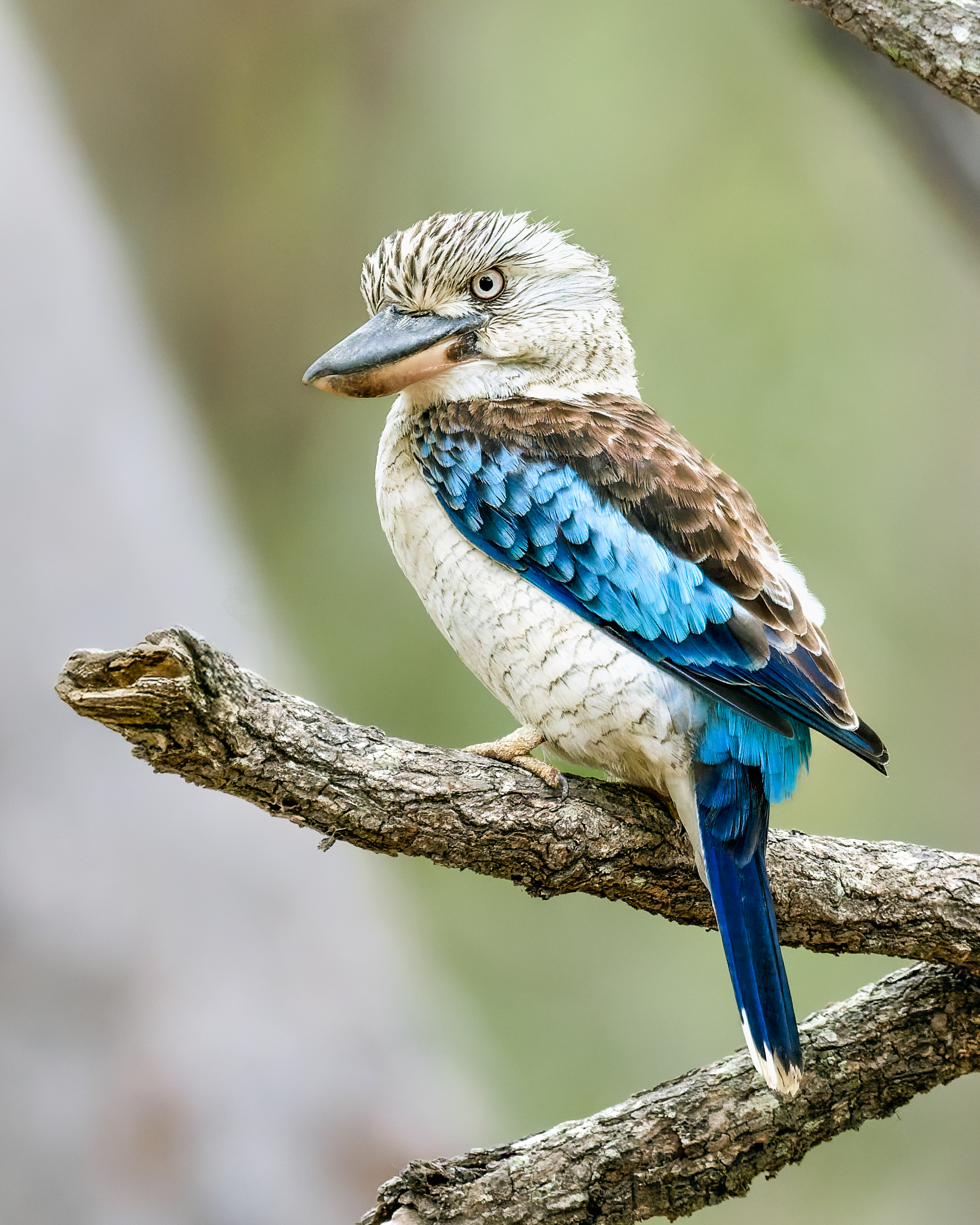
- Male
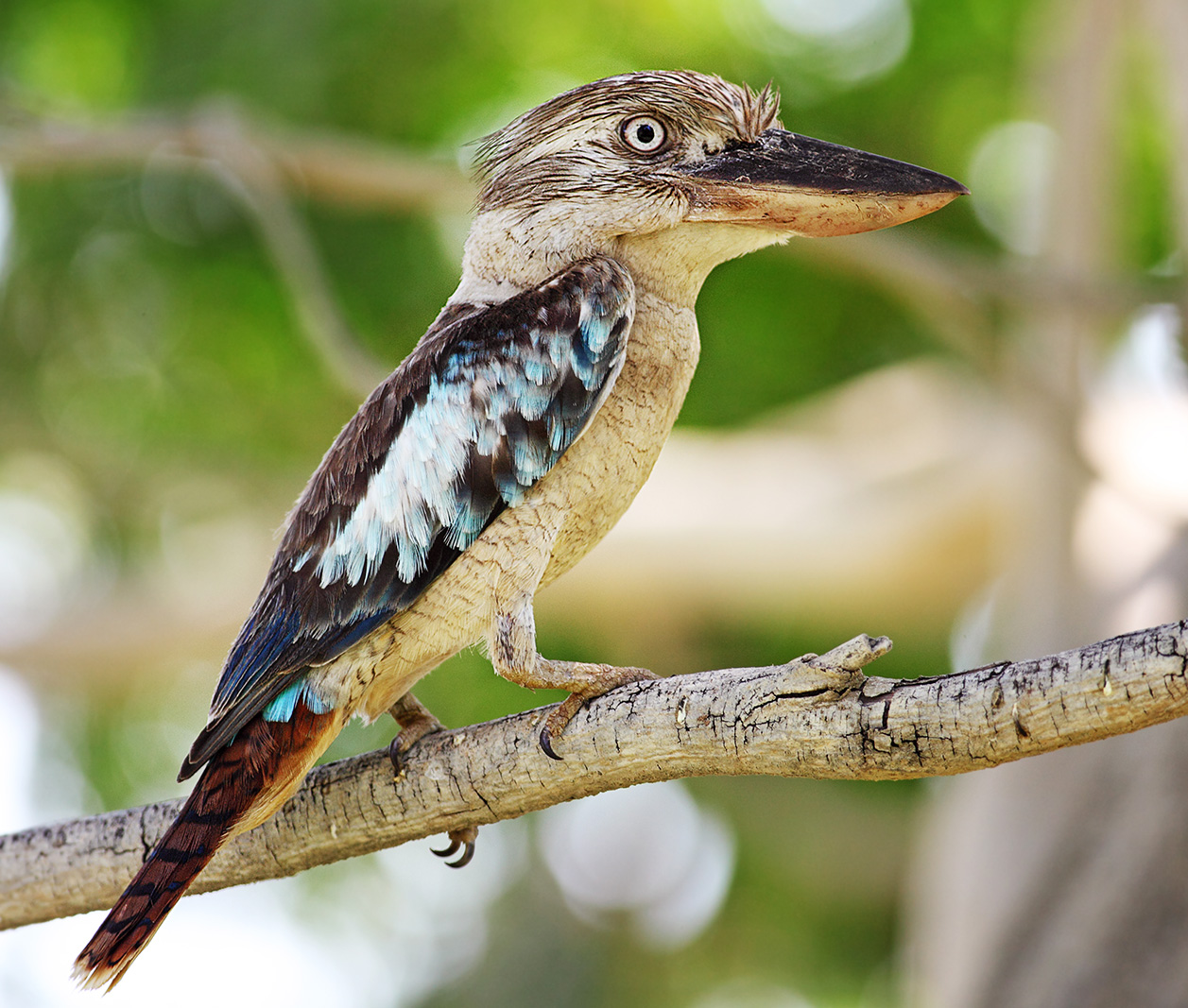
- Female

Conservation status
- Least Concern (IUCN 3.1)

Scientific classification
- Kingdom: Animalia
- Phylum: Chordata
- Class: Aves
- Order: Coraciiformes
- Family: Alcedinidae
- Subfamily: Halcyoninae
- Genus: Dacelo
- Species: D. leachii

Binomial name
- Dacelo leachii Vigors & Horsfield, 1827

= Blue-winged kookaburra =

Species of bird

The blue-winged kookaburra (Dacelo leachii) is a large species of kingfisher native to northern Australia and southern New Guinea.

Measuring around 40 cm (16 in), it is slightly smaller than the more familiar laughing kookaburra. It has cream-coloured upper- and underparts barred with brownish markings. It has blue wings and brown shoulders and blue rump. It is sexually dimorphic, with a blue tail in the male, and a rufous tail with blackish bars in the female.

== Taxonomy ==
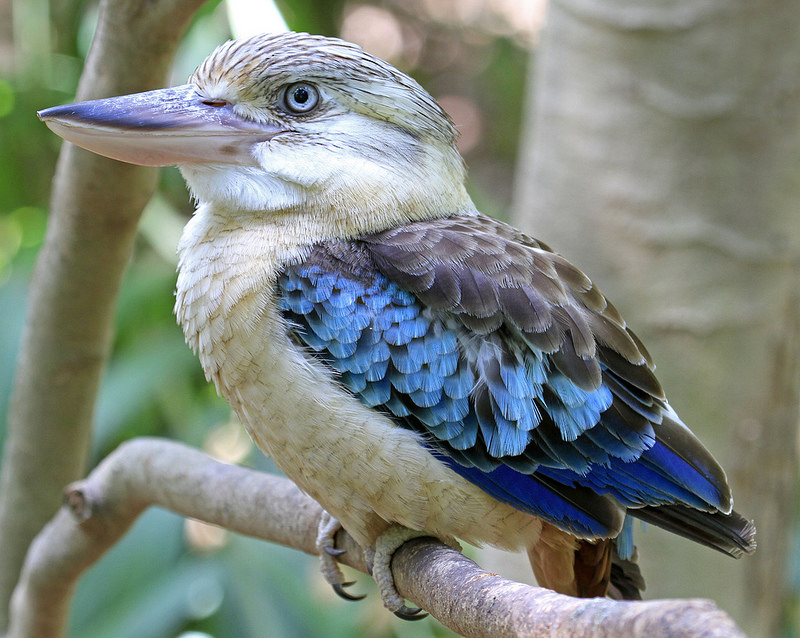
Blue Winged kookaburra - Berry Springs - Northern Territory - Australia

The blue-winged kookaburra was first collected by Sir Joseph Banks in 1770, but was initially overlooked and confused with the laughing kookaburra, and was finally officially described by Nicholas Aylward Vigors and Thomas Horsfield in 1826, its specific name commemorating British zoologist William Elford Leach. It is one of four members of the genus Dacelo which are commonly known as kookaburras. Alternative common names include barking or howling jackass, or Leach's kookaburra.

The number of subspecies is unclear - with four or five recognised by authorities currently. Some authorities split the population in New Guinea into two subspecies, while other merge them together. Previously, others have also proposed that the three Australian subspecies gradually change across Australia and should be treated as one.

- D. l. leachii is the nominate subspecies, found from Brisbane to Broome.
- D. l. cervina is found on Melville Island and the adjacent mainland.
- D. l. occidentalis is found in the Pilbara and Hamersley regions of northwestern Australia.
- D. l. intermedia is found in south-central and southeastern New Guinea.
- D. l. superflua is found in southwestern New Guinea.

== Description ==
The adult blue-winged kookaburra measures around 38 to 42 cm (15 to 17 in) in length and weighs 260 to 330 g (9.2 to 11.6 oz). Compared to the related laughing kookaburra, it is smaller, lacks a dark mask, has more blue in the wing, and has striking white eyes. It has a heavier bill than its larger relative. The head and underparts are cream-coloured with brownish streaks. It is sexually dimorphic, with a blue tail in the male, and a rufous tail with blackish bars in the female. Immature birds have more prominent brown bars and marks in their plumage, giving a "dirty" appearance, and their eyes are predominantly brown for the first two years of life.

Their call has been described as a maniacal cackling or barking.

== Distribution and habitat ==
The blue-winged kookaburra has a distribution from southern New Guinea and the moister parts of northern Australia, to the vicinity of Brisbane in southern Queensland across the Top End, and as far down the Western Australian coast as the Shark Bay area. It does not occur between Broome and Port Hedland in northwestern Australia. Widespread and common throughout its large range, the blue-winged kookaburra is evaluated as of least concern on the IUCN Red List of Threatened Species. Found in family groups of up to 12 individuals, it lives in open savannah woodland and Melaleuca swamps, as well as farmlands such as sugarcane plantations.

== Feeding ==
The blue-winged kookaburra hunts and eats a great variety of animals that live on or close to the ground. In the summer wet season, insects, lizards and frogs make up a higher proportion of their diet, while they eat arthropods such as crayfish, scorpions, and spiders, as well as fish, earthworms, small birds and rodents at other times. They have even been recorded waiting for and snatching insects flushed out by bushfires.

== Breeding ==
The blue-winged kookaburra is a co-operative breeder, a group being made up of a breeding pair and one or more helper birds that help raise the young. Breeding occurs once a year in late spring (September to December). The nest is a hollow high up in a tree, often 25 m (82 ft) or so above the ground. Three or four white, slightly shiny eggs, measuring 44 mm × 35 mm (1.7 in × 1.4 in) or a little larger, are laid. The female incubates the eggs around 26 days, and nestlings spend another 36 days in the nest before fledging. Chicks are born pink, blind, and naked (i.e. altricial), and break their way out of the egg with an egg tooth on the bill. Feathers appear by 7 days and their eyes open from the 10th day onwards. Kookaburra hatchlings are often highly aggressive in the first week of life, and the youngest chick is often killed by the older chicks during this period. Once fledged, juvenile birds must be taught how to hunt by their parents for a further 6–10 weeks before they can properly fend for themselves.

== Threats ==
The red goshawk and rufous owl prey upon the blue-winged kookaburra. Adult birds are also slow flyers and vulnerable to being hit by cars on country roads. Nests are susceptible to raids by olive pythons, quolls, and goannas.

== Gallery ==
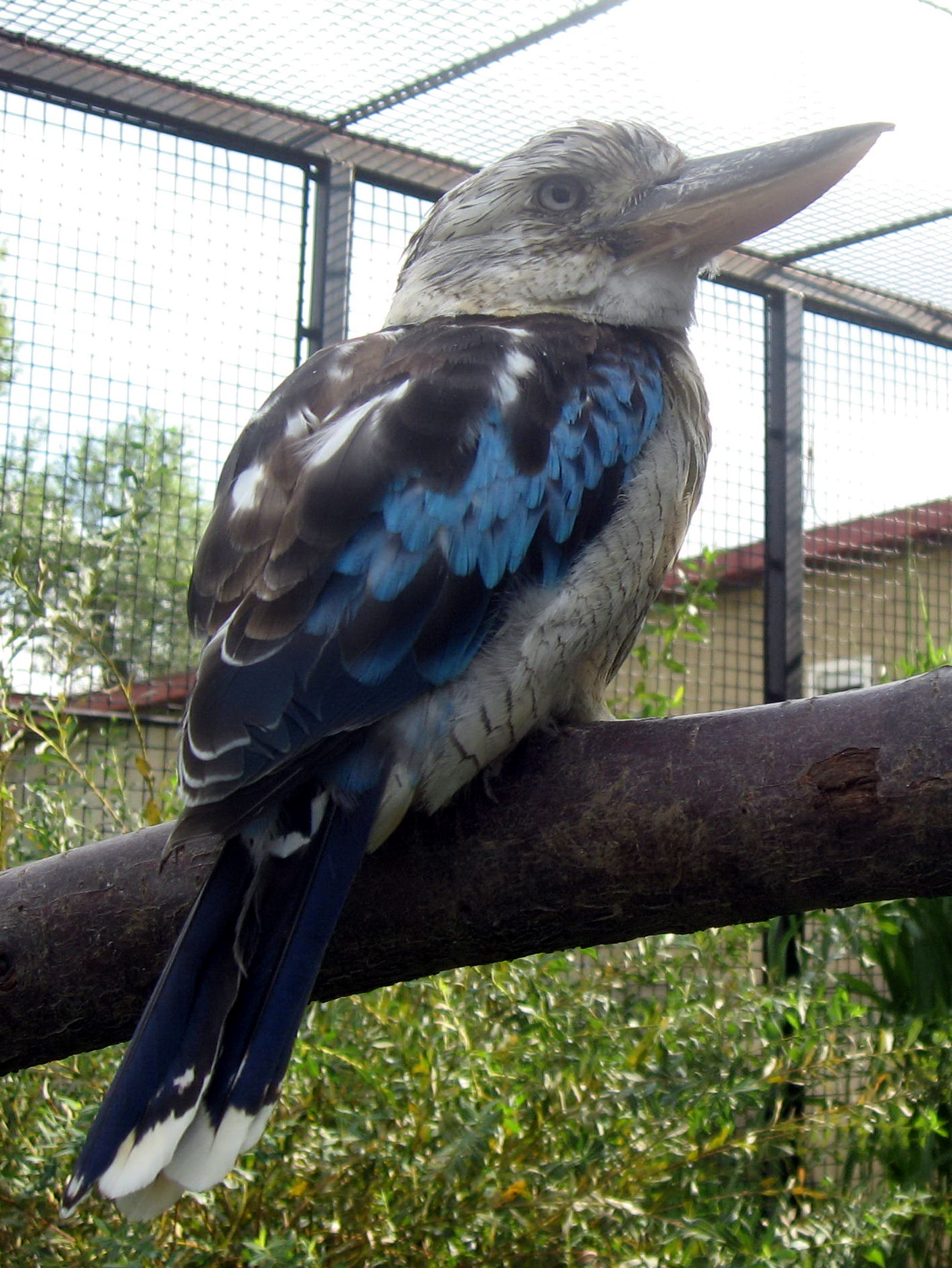
Male in captivity

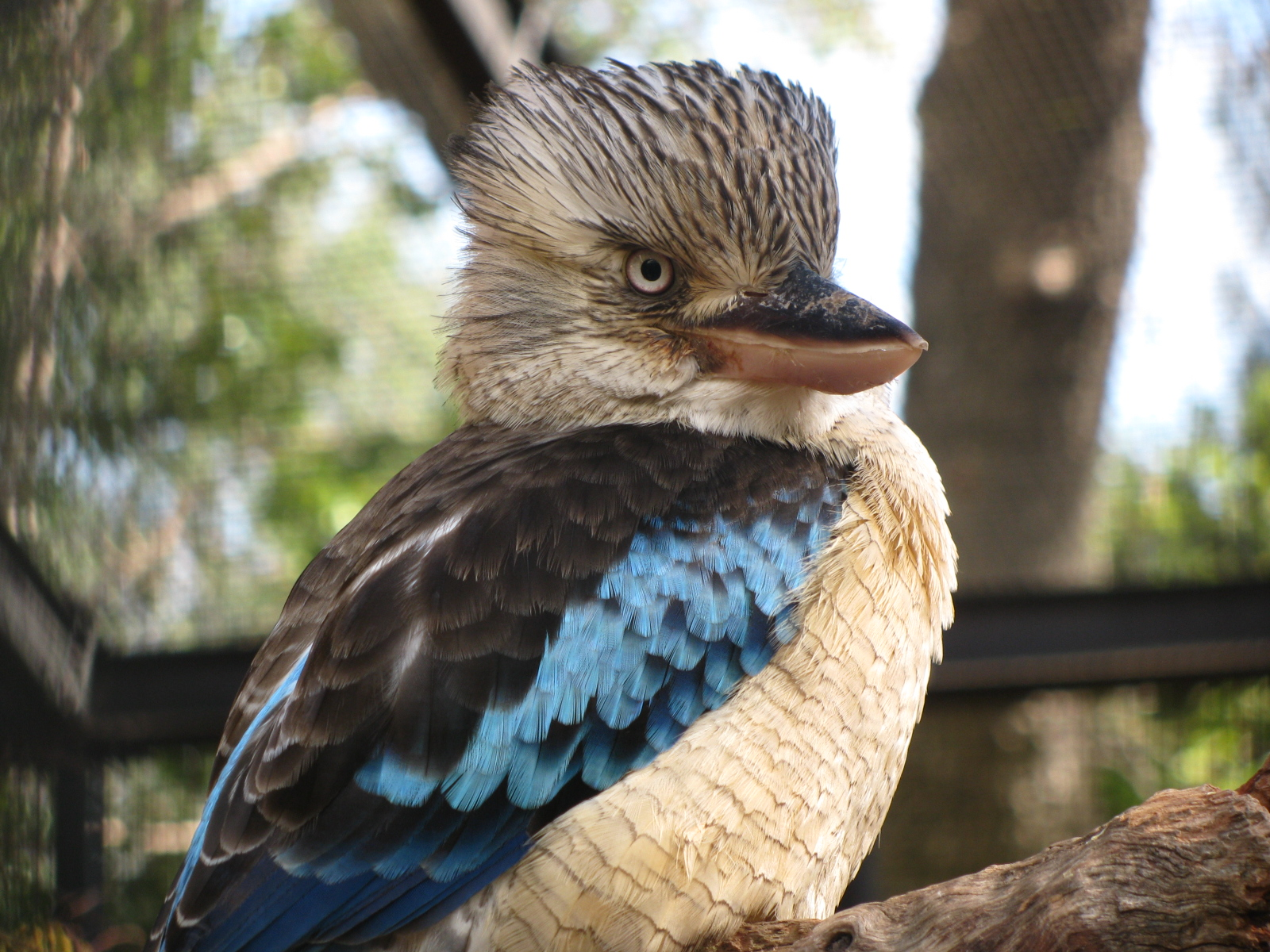
Male at Adelaide Zoo

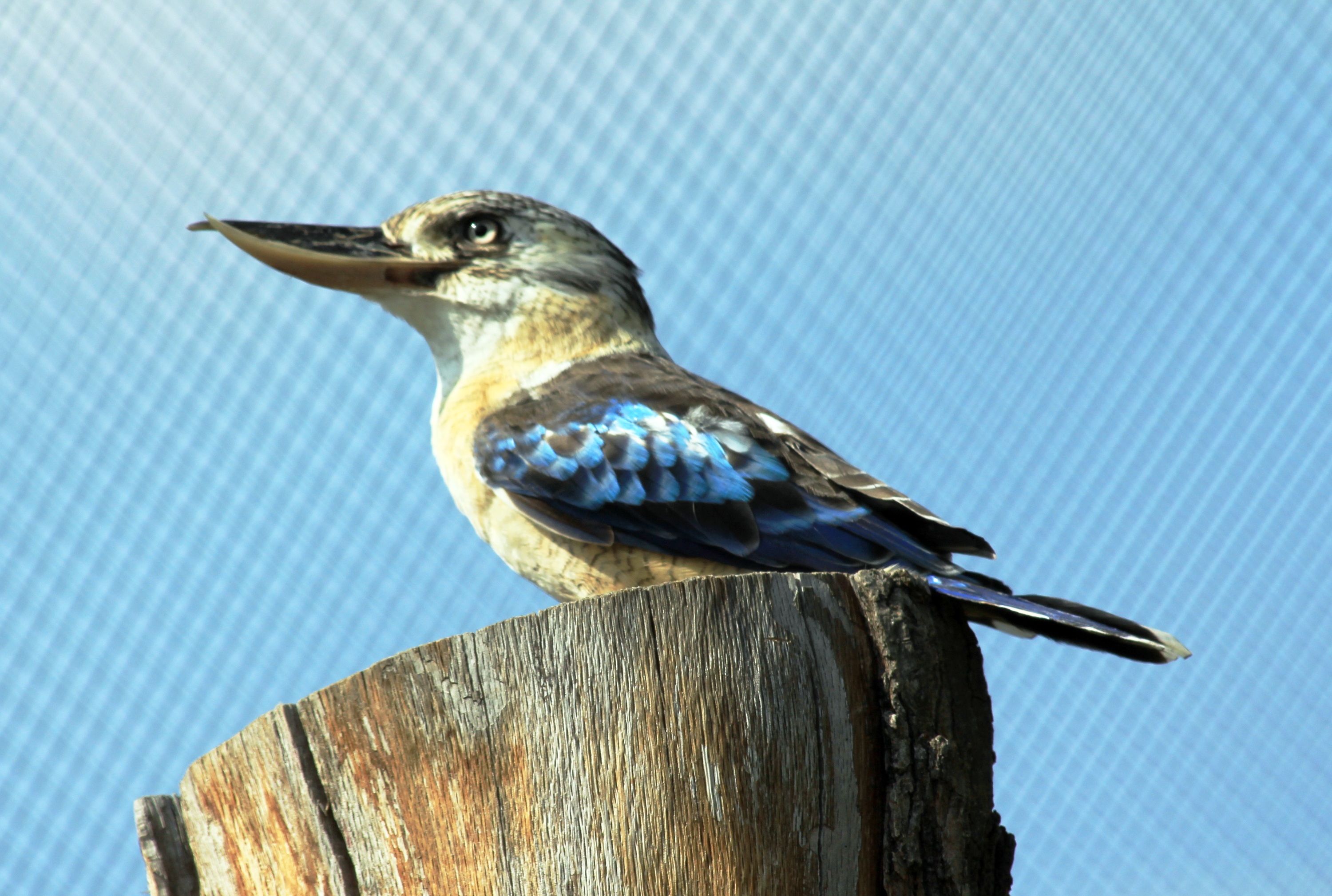
In Prague Zoo

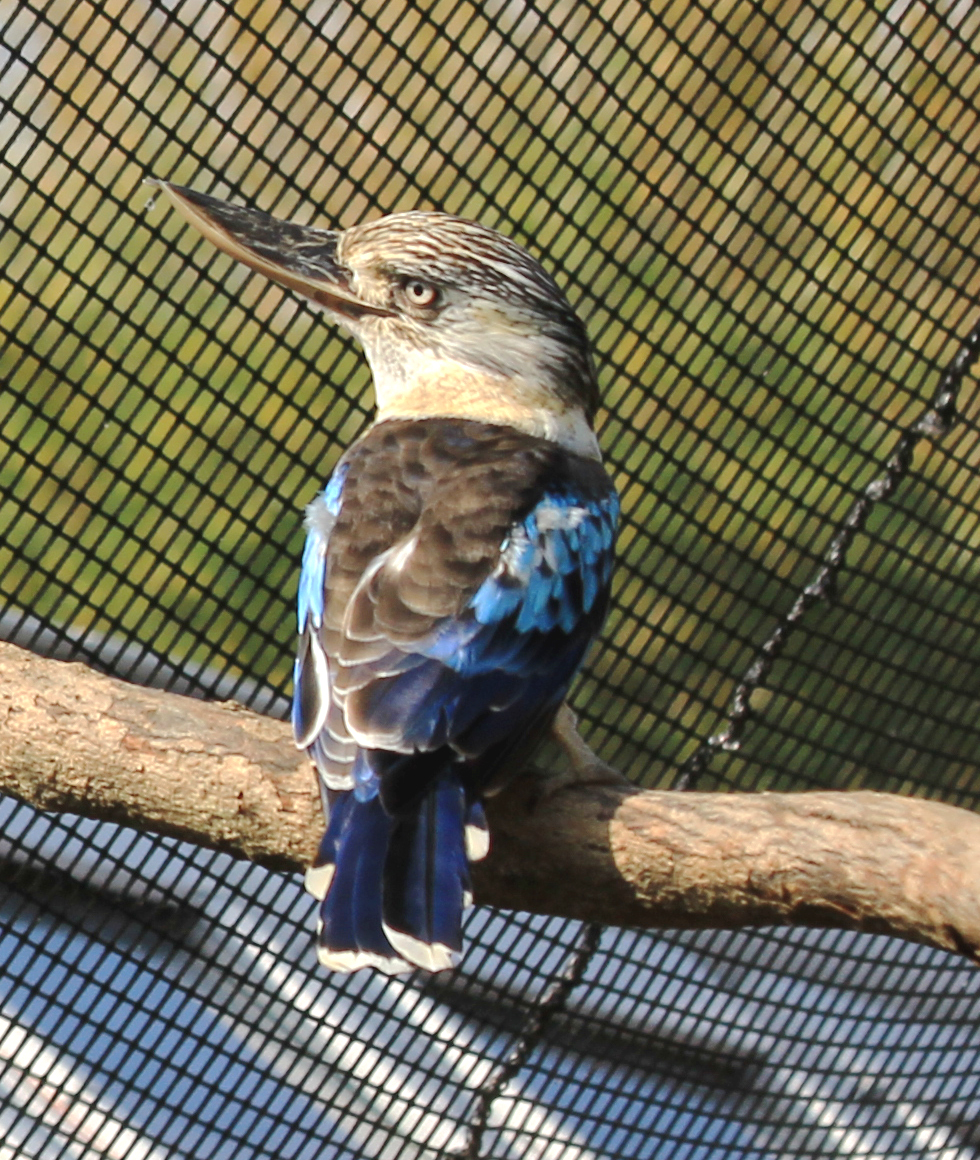
In Prague Zoo

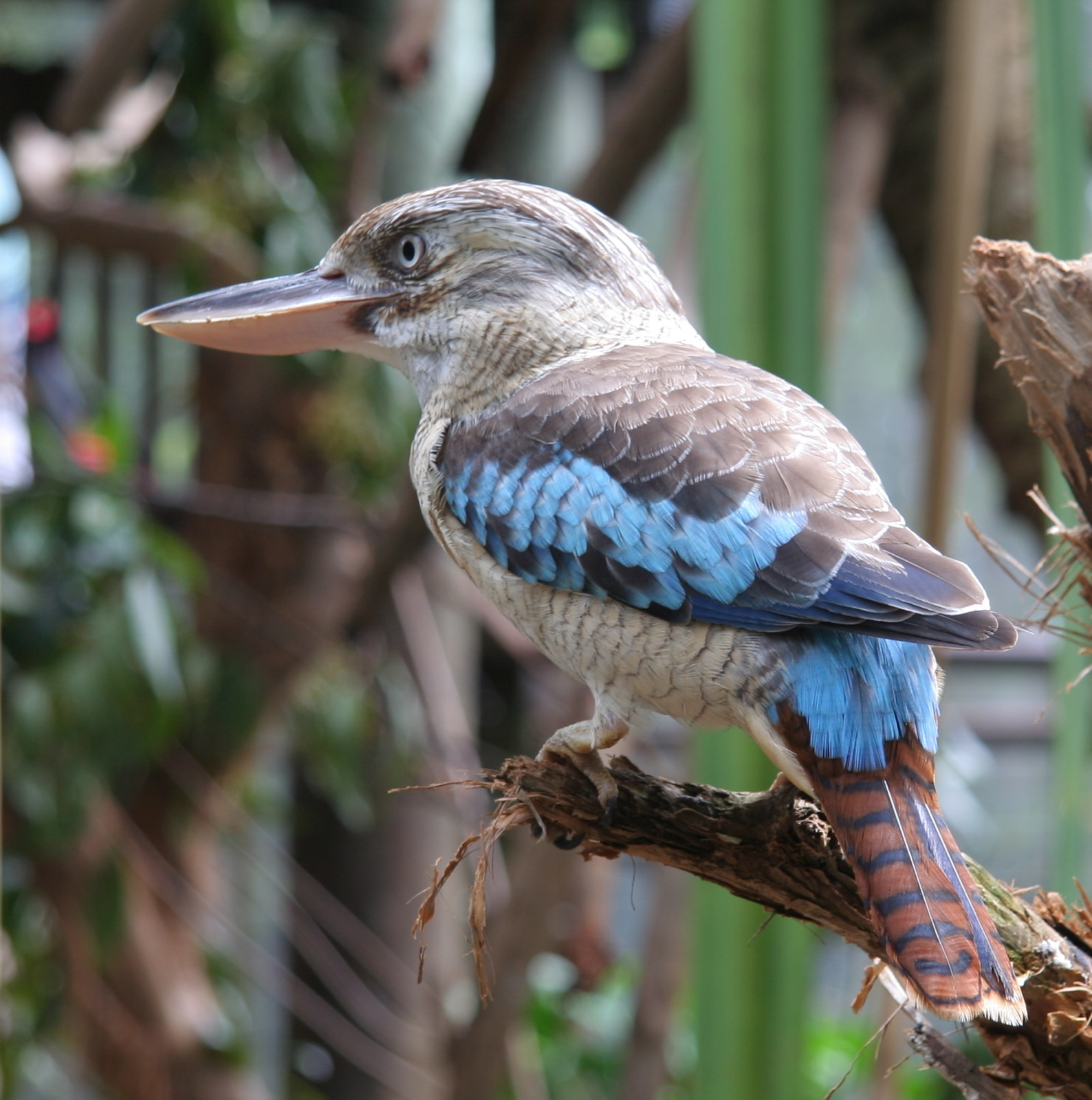
Female

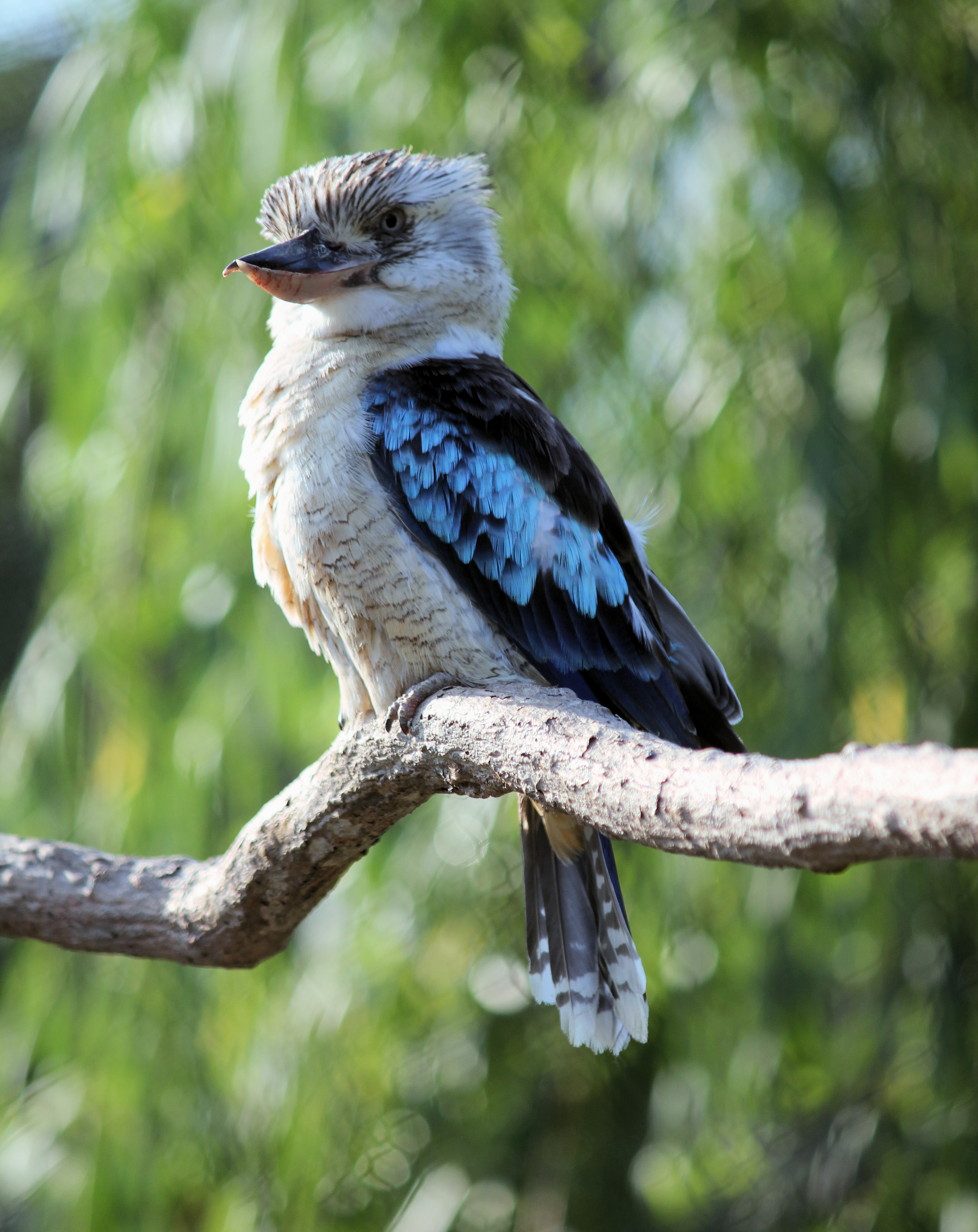
In Prague Zoo

Lester Bridge, SE Queensland, Australia

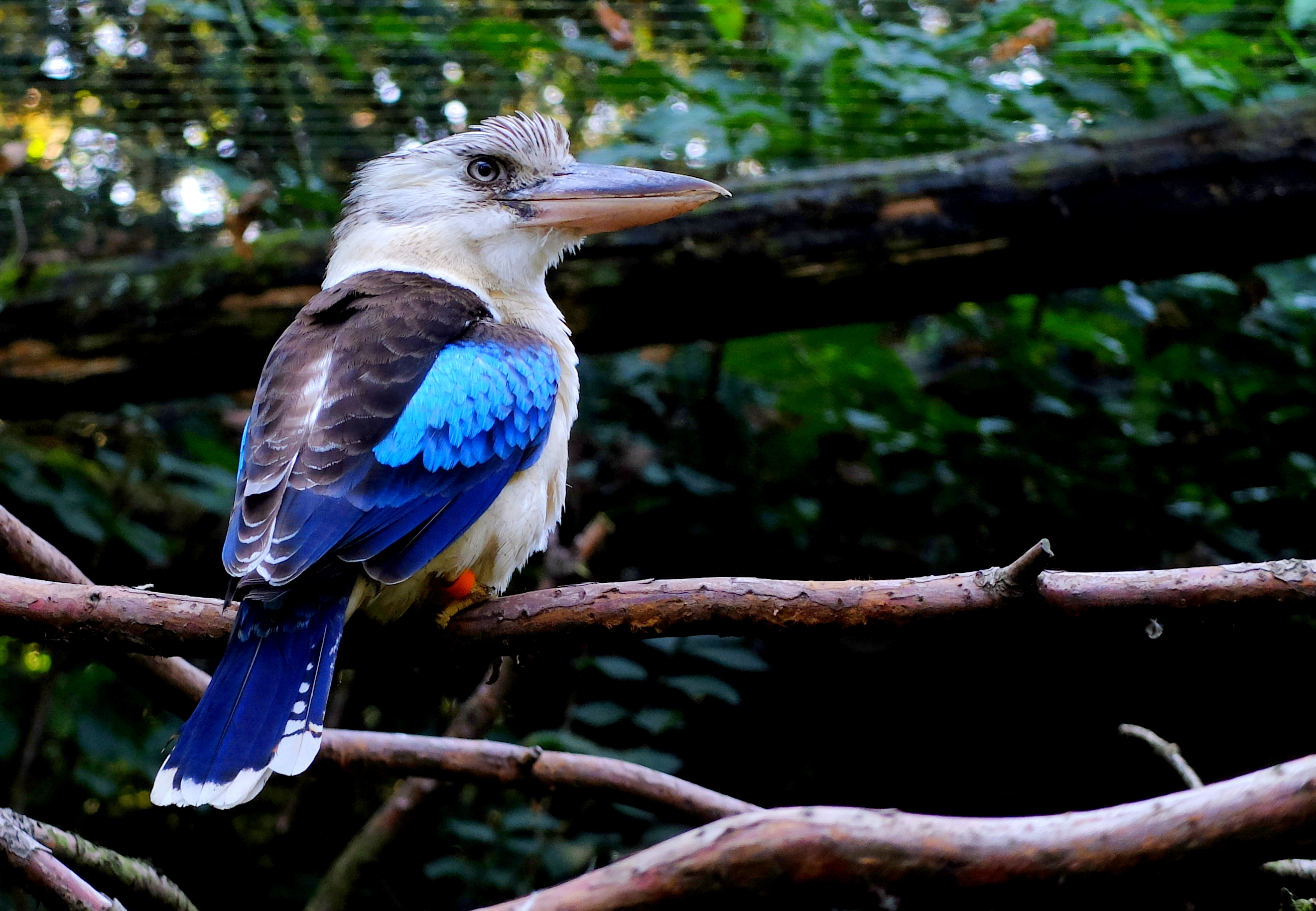
In Dutch bird park Avifauna
