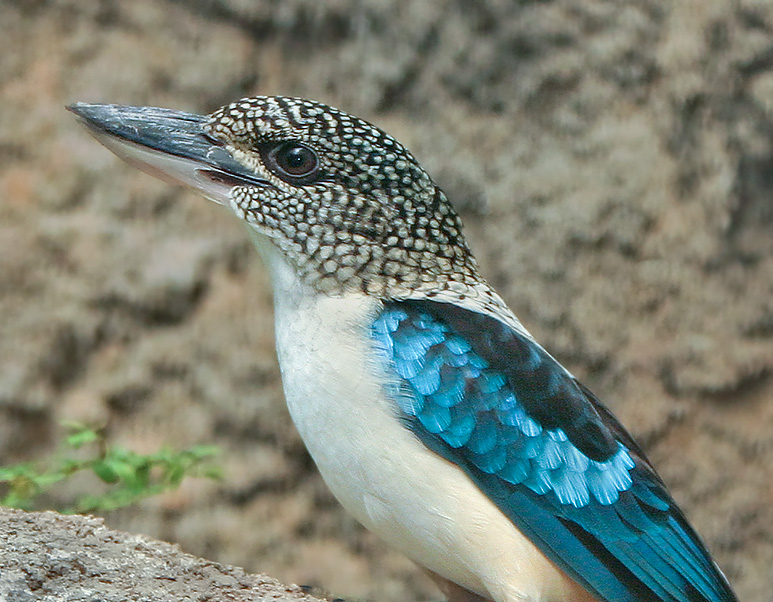

Conservation status
- Least Concern (IUCN 3.1)

Scientific classification
- Kingdom: Animalia
- Phylum: Chordata
- Class: Aves
- Order: Coraciiformes
- Family: Alcedinidae
- Subfamily: Halcyoninae
- Genus: Dacelo
- Species: D. tyro

Binomial name
- Dacelo tyro Gray, 1858

Subspecies
- D. t. archboldi - (Rand, 1938); D. t. tyro - Gray, GR, 1858

= Spangled kookaburra =

Species of bird

The spangled kookaburra (Dacelo tyro), also called the Aru giant kingfisher, is a species of kookaburra found in the Aru Islands, Trans-Fly savanna and grasslands of southern New Guinea. Little is known of its family life or breeding biology.

== Taxonomy ==
Two subspecies are recognised:

- D. t. tyro – Aru Islands, Indonesia
- D. t. archboldi – New Guinea

== Description ==
The spangled kookaburra grows to 33 cm (13 in) in length, with females growing slightly larger than males. It has bright blue wings and tail, a white chest and belly, dark eyes, and a black head with white spots. The upper mandible is dark grey whilst the lower mandible is white. The species has no sexual dimorphism - males and females look alike.
