= Misalliance (Playhouse 90) =

- Playhouse 90 episode
- Episode no.: Season 4 Episode 3
- Directed by: Robert Stevens
- Written by: Meade Roberts
- Original air date: October 29, 1959

Guest appearances
- Claire Bloom; Siobhan McKenna; Rod Taylor; Kenneth Haigh; John Williams; Robert Morley; Isobel Elsom

Episode chronology
← Previous "The Sounds of Eden"	Next → "The Hidden Image"

"Misalliance" was an American television play broadcast live on October 29, 1959, as part of the CBS television series, Playhouse 90. It was the third episode of the fourth season of Playhouse 90 and the 120th episode overall.

== Plot ==
The plot concerns the rivalry between the aristocracy and middle class as played out between an English country gentleman, his family, an airline pilot, a passenger, and a socialist.

== Cast ==
- Claire Bloom as Hypatia
- Siobhan McKenna as Lina
- Rod Taylor as Joey Percival
- Kenneth Haigh as Gunner
- John Williams as Lord Summerhayes
- Robert Morley as John Tarleton
- Isobel Elsom as Mrs. Tarleton
- Robert Casper as Bentley

== Production ==
John Houseman was the producer, and Robert Stevens was the director. Meade Roberts wrote the teleplay based on George Bernard Shaw's play Misalliance.

== Reception ==
Critics were divided in their reviews of the production.

Cynthia Lowry of the Associated Press described it as "so full of plot that I still don't know what went on."

Fred Danzig of the UPI called it "delicious" and praised the "clever cast."

In The New York Times, Jack Gould panned the production as "dated" and "strained". He concluded that "the deluge of words" left one "too limp to worry about the plot." He also noted that the cast "raced through its lines at breakneck speed but without scant fair or flavor."
