= Seven Against the Wall =

- Playhouse 90 episode
- Episode no.: Season 3 Episode 11
- Directed by: Franklin J. Schaffner
- Story by: Howard Browne
- Teleplay by: David Davidson
- Presented by: Edward G. Robinson
- Original air date: December 11, 1958
- Running time: 90 mins

Episode chronology
← Previous "Free Weekend"	Next → "The Nutcracker"

"Seven Against the Wall" is an episode of the American anthology series Playhouse 90. It was about the Saint Valentine's Day Massacre.

== Cast ==
- Paul Lambert as Al Capone
- Dennis Patrick as George "Bugs" Moran
- Frank Silvera as Nick Sorrello
- Paul Stevens as Jack "Machine Gun Jack" McGurn
- Dennis Cross as Pete "Goosey" Gusenberg
- Barry Cahill as Frank "Tight Lips" Gusenberg
- Richard Carlyle as Reinhardt Schwimmer
- Al Ruscio as Albert "Gorilla Al" Weinshank
- George Keymas as James Clark
- Milton Frome as Adam Heyer
- Wayne Heffley as John May
- Nesdon Booth as Mike "The Pike" Heitler
- Joe de Santis as Charlie "Trigger Happy" Fischetti
- Tige Andrews as Frank "The Enforcer" Nitti
- Lewis Charles as Jake "Greasy Thumb" Guzik
- Paul Burke as Paul Salvanti
- Don Gordon as "Bobo" Borotta
- Richard Sinatra as John Scalise
- Tito Vuolo as Albert Anselmi
- Karl Lukas as Willie Marks
- Warren Oates as Ted Ryan
- Nicholas Georgiade as Rocco
- Sid Cassel as Angelo
- Joe Abdullah as Joey
- Robert Cass as O'Meara
- Paul Maxwell as Cooley
- Arthur Hanson as Mueller
- Connie Davis as Mrs. Walsh
- Jean Inness as Mrs. Greeley
- Celia Lovsky as Mrs. Schwimmer
- Louise Fletcher as Pete's Girl
- Richard Venture as Passerby

== Production ==
The show was based on a book by Howard Browne.

== Reception ==
The Los Angeles Times called it "a serviceable documentary" with "some extremely effective moments."

The show was very popular and John Houseman claimed it helped revive the popularity of gangster films. "There hadn't been a real Al Capone gangster film for a long time and this brought them back again, both at the cinema and on television", he said.

Howard Browne later wrote other film versions of the story, including The St. Valentine's Day Massacre (1967) and Capone (1975).

=== Lawsuit ===
Industrialist Titus Haffa sued the show's makers for $10 million for libel and defamation complaining the show showed a headline "Titus Haffa gets two years" associating him with crime. Haffa later issued a second complaint. A person called Abe Bernstein also sued claiming the show said "Abe Bernstein" was head of The Purple Gang.
