= Capone (1975 film) =

1975 film by Steve Carver

- Theatrical release poster by John Solie
- Directed by: Steve Carver
- Written by: Howard Browne
- Produced by: Roger Corman
- Starring: Ben Gazzara; Harry Guardino; Susan Blakely; John Cassavetes
- Cinematography: Vilis Lapenieks
- Edited by: Richard C. Meyer
- Music by: David Grisman
- Production company: Santa Fe Productions
- Distributed by: 20th Century Fox
- Release date: April 6, 1975 (United States)
- Running time: 101 minutes
- Country: United States
- Language: English
- Budget: $970,000
- Box office: $2 million

Capone is a 1975 American action crime film directed by Steve Carver and produced by Roger Corman, based on the life of notorious 20th-century gangster Al Capone. It stars Ben Gazzara in the title role, along with Harry Guardino, Susan Blakely, John Cassavetes, and Sylvester Stallone in an early film appearance.

Corman had previously directed The St. Valentine's Day Massacre (1967), which also had a screenplay written by Howard Browne and starred Jason Robards as Capone. Though the film was promoted as a faithful reenactment of Capone's life, it takes many artistic liberties. Among other embellishments, the film makes no mention of Capone's wife and daughter, while giving him a (fictional) love interest in Susan Blakely's Iris Crawford. The film also depicts Frank Nitti (played by Stallone) eulogizing Capone in his funeral, when in fact Capone outlived Nitti by several years.

The film was released by 20th Century Fox on April 6, 1975. It received negative reviews from critics, though it was a commercial success.

== Plot ==
The story is of the rise and fall of Chicago mob boss Al Capone and the control he exhibited over the city during Prohibition, all the way through to his conviction, imprisonment, and final years.

On the evening of May 6, 1918, in Brooklyn, two police officers intercept several men stealing fur clothing as they escape through an alleyway. Capone, then a young hoodlum, had tipped them off to the heist so that he could ambush the cops on arrival. The resulting fight ends with Capone being thrown through a glass window, leaving him with a scarred left cheek. Capone is soon released from custody without being charged due to the intercession of a senior police lieutenant. As he walks out of the station, the hoodlum is taken to see racketeers Johnny Torrio and Frankie Yale. It is revealed that the fur thieves worked for Johnny and Yale, and because Capone has impressed them with his cunning and brutality, they invite him to join the Five Points Gang.

A year later, on September 23, 1919, Johnny talks with his boss "Big" Jim Colosimo about Prohibition – a new law banning the sale of alcohol. Johnny is eager to invest millions into bootlegging, but Colosimo, seeing such a trade as beneath him, refuses. Johnny calls Frankie and tells him to send Capone to Chicago to employ him as an enforcer for Colosimo. Johnny introduces Capone to co-workers, including dancer and barmaid Iris Crawford. Johnny, despite his affection for Colosimo, realizes that murdering him is the only way to put his bootlegging scheme into action. The next morning, as Colosimo enters a restaurant to use the phone, Capone sneaks in and quietly shoots the boss dead in the back of the neck.

On June 7, 1920, in Joliet, Illinois, during a pickup of beer for bootlegger Edward "Spike" O'Donnell, mobsters led by brothers Frank and Peter Gusenberg – enforcers working for Dion O'Banion – intercept the deal, gun down the participants, and steal it for themselves. Capone correctly suspects that Banion's henchman Hymie Weiss is responsible, and Johnny responds by dividing Chicago into separate territories: O'Banion and his men will control the North Side, Spike O'Donnell will have his own territory in the South Side, the Genna brothers will deal in Little Italy; and Johnny's gang, the "Chicago Outfit", will occupy the Loop and part of the South Side.

On September 5, 1923, as Capone and Johnny prepare to shift their base of operations to Cicero, Spike O'Donnell is gunned down by O'Banion's men in a turf war. At O'Donnell's funeral, O'Banion threatens to murder the Genna brothers next. That night, Pete and Frank personally gun down several blood relatives of the Gennas. Outraged, Antonio and Angelo Genna retaliate by placing a hit on O'Banion. Corrupt Chicago deputy sheriff Joe Pryor breaks up one of Capone's parties after Capone refuses to pay him a bribe of $5,000; Capone has no choice but to pay him then. Capone then takes Iris golfing while his hitmen murder O'Banion in a flower store. Capone and Johnny later show up at his funeral, angering Weiss who suspects them of killing his friend.

On the night of January 15, 1925, Johnny tells Capone that, because of all the heat Capone has brought on them by committing countless acts of violence in public, he is prepared to give Weiss most of their territory as a peace offering. Capone is furious at the idea but does not stop Johnny from leaving. At the meeting spot, Johnny is ambushed by Weiss and three gunmen, who shoot him multiple times. Johnny survives but accepts that he no longer has any stomach for a life of crime. He decides to leave America for his homeland of Italy, giving control of the Outfit to Capone.

On the night of April 27, 1926, Capone and his button men ambush four of Weiss' men, plus a crooked State's Attorney on Weiss' payroll, at a Cicero inn on the mistaken assumption that Weiss is with them. Two of the men and the State's Attorney are killed. Capone then hears a newscast on the radio revealing that Weiss is still alive. Capone is brought before District Attorney Robert E. Crowe, who threatens to have Capone indicted by a grand jury for assassinating a government official. Capone replies that if he does so, his lawyers will reveal the extent to which Chicago authorities have worked with the Outfit; a humiliated Crowe drops the charges. The next morning, Capone and Iris go on a picnic, and after losing Capone's bodyguards, they have sex.

On September 20, 1926, North Side gunmen carry out a drive-by shooting at a hotel where Capone is drinking. Capone is saved only due to the quick thinking of his ambitious bodyguard Frank Nitti. Identifying one of his attackers as Weiss, Capone retaliates by ordering a hit on Weiss that night; two men from a rooftop over the North Side headquarters unload their tommy guns into Weiss and his men, killing them. Joe Aiello, a bootlegger who refuses to deal with Capone and blames him for his brother's death, meets with Bugs Moran, Weiss' successor. They pay off a waiter to poison Capone when he goes to his favorite restaurant, but the man has a change of heart and betrays them to Capone. The next morning, Aiello is killed by a car bomb planted by Nitti.

On February 7, 1929, Capone decides to get rid of Moran's gang. That night, as he and Iris share a French dinner, hitmen sent by Moran shoot up the bistro, and Iris is killed. Capone is deeply heartbroken by Iris's death, and he and Nitti swear revenge. Newly elected Mayor Anton Cermak and the city council, wanting to improve Chicago's image and put a stop to gang violence, insist that he end his feud with Moran at any cost even if it means losing territory and money. When Cermak threatens Capone by saying he can withdraw the political protection that keeps him from being prosecuted, Capone once again reminds the council that the vast trove of evidence he has of their corruption makes him untouchable by the law.

The next morning, on February 14, 1929, Capone's men, posing as police officers conducting a raid, enter one of Moran's warehouses and force seven men, including the Gusenberg brothers, to line up against the wall before machine-gunning them to death. Nitti, believing that Capone has finally gone too far, betrays him and provides the city council with the means to have him brought to trial. On June 16, 1931, after a lengthy process, Capone is finally found guilty not of murder, bootlegging, or any other serious crimes, but of multiple counts of federal tax evasion. The judge sentences Capone to serve eleven years at Alcatraz in San Francisco, California.

On February 2, 1938, a doctor visits Capone, whose health has started to deteriorate, and concludes that Capone has contracted syphilis. Noting that the disease has progressed too far for treatment, he warns the prison authorities that the gangster's mind will be the first thing to go. Capone starts a prison riot and is hastily forced back into his cell.

At Capone's estate in Palm Island, Florida on April 5, 1946, Nitti visits Capone and his caretakers only to find that Capone is now a shell of his former self, to the point where he starts yelling at Nitti believing him to be an FBI agent. Nitti's bodyguard reminds him that people have always said Capone used to be a smart man, but Nitti – who had shown his ambition and loyalty only to watch Capone destroy everything they built – finally disregards this and expresses his true feelings about his old boss, saying that Capone was stupid and forgetful and only cared about killing people. As the two of them leave, Capone continues to wither away until he dies a year later from complications of his illness.

== Cast ==
- Ben Gazzara as Al Capone
- Harry Guardino as Johnny "The Fox" Torrio
- Susan Blakely as Iris Crawford
- John Cassavetes as Frankie Yale
- Sylvester Stallone as Frank Ralph "The Enforcer" Nitti
- Frank Campanella as Vincenzo "Big Jim" Colosimo
- John Orchard as Dean "Dion" O'Banion
- Carmen Argenziano as Jack "Machine Gun Jack" McGurn
- George Chandler as Robert E. Crowe
- John Davis Chandler as Earl "Hymie" Weiss
- Royal Dano as Anton Cermak
- Peter Maloney as Jake "Greasy Thumb" Guzik
- Carmen Filpi as Walter
- Dick Miller as Joe Pryor
- Robert Phillips as George "Bugs" Moran
- Martin Kove as Peter "Goosey" Gusenberg
- Mario Gallo as Giuseppe "Joe" Aiello
- Tony Giorgio as Antonio "Tony The Scourge" Lombardo
- Johnny Martino as Tony Amatto
- Tina Scala as Mrs. Torrio

== Production ==
=== Development and writing ===
Screenwriter Howard Browne had written about Al Capone a number of times previously, including "Seven Against the Wall" for Playhouse 90 in 1958, and the film, The St. Valentine's Day Massacre (1967). The latter was directed by Roger Corman for 20th Century Fox.

In May 1974 Browne announced he was writing a biopic about Capone for Roger Corman called The Big Fella. It would cover Capone's life from being a young man until his death. In June Corman declared he would make the Capone film for his company, New World Pictures. However, in September it was announced he would produce the movie for 20th Century Fox.

In October 1974 it was reported Gazzara was considering an offer to play the lead.

=== Filming ===
Steve Carver says the film was shot in part so Corman could use footage from other films he had made. He claimed Howard Browne was a very factual writer but "not so good with dialogue" so other writers were brought in to work on the script. Carver says Gazzara was hard to work with on set.

In an interview in 2020 Carver related how Gazzara, possibly under the influence of alcohol, set off a series of explosions and bullet hits too early: "Ben was the key in starting this off by pulling the trigger of a submachine gun. And he jumped the cue. He pulled the trigger too early. That set off a tremendous occurrence where stuntmen and cars went crazy. A lot of people could have gotten hurt." Carver says Gazzara apologized the next day.

Sylvester Stallone was cast on the basis of his appearance in Lords of Flatbush. He later said "I particularly enjoyed working on Capone, because it was like the cheesy, mentally challenged inbred cousin of The Godfather". Stallone later made Death Race 2000 for Corman.

== Release ==
=== Home media ===
The film was released on DVD in the United States for the first time on March 29, 2011, through Shout! Factory and has been available in Europe for some time.

== Reception ==
=== Box office ===
The film was a success at the box office making $2 million. Corman made three more films for Fox, Moving Violation, Fighting Mad and Thunder and Lightning.

=== Critical response ===
Roger Corman said Carver "did a good job. Gazzara was very good as Capone."

Sight and Sound said "Roger Corman unprofitably goes back over ground he has more succinctly and wittily explored before, simply to fill in some gaps in the Capone biography (how he began as a street hoodlum; how he ended as a syphilitic madman). Even more unprofitably, the direction is left in the unsubtle care of Steve Carver."

In the Chicago Sun-Times, film critic Roger Ebert gave the film only one star (out of four), summing up:

During the chase scenes, the cars keep chasing each other around the same corners, because there are only about four corners in the whole City, and native Chicagoans will be amazed to see the lushly wooded California hills rising at the end of Wabash Ave. Ben Gazzara, as Capone, talks in a shrill shout that makes us want to turn the treble down, and he’s surrounded by a supporting cast that looks almost as embarrassed as he does. The acting isn’t really the point, though, because the movie has been so chopped into neatly dated segments that no development of character and personality is really possible. The characters get their labels and wear them and die with them, and that’s it.

On the review aggregator website Rotten Tomatoes, 32% of 44 critics' reviews are positive. The website's consensus reads: "A disjointed and murky biopic, Capone offers little more than a series of blood soaked shoot-outs."
