= Peter Gusenberg =

German-American contract killer

- Born: September 22, 1888; Chicago, Illinois, US
- Died: February 14, 1929 (aged 40); Lincoln Park, Chicago, US
- Burial place: Irving Park Cemetery
- Known for: Saint Valentine's Day Massacre victim Member of North Side Gang; Gang criminal Contract killer

Peter "Goosey" Gusenberg (September 22, 1888 – February 14, 1929), like his younger brother Frank, was a German-American contract killer and member of Chicago's North Side Gang, the main rival to the Chicago Outfit. Peter Gusenberg participated in an infamous attack on Al Capone during a vicious gang war.

== Early life ==
Peter Gusenberg Jr. was born at the Alexian Brothers Medical Center in Chicago, Illinois to Peter Sr. and his wife. He was the firstborn of three sons and the namesake of his father Peter Gusenberg (Gusenberger) Sr. who was a first-generation Roman Catholic emigrant from Gusenburg, a municipality in the Trier-Saarburg district, in Rhineland-Palatinate, Germany and his wife. His parents moved into a home at 434 Roscoe Street in Lakeview, Chicago where Peter lived with his brothers Frank (October 11, 1893 Chicago, Illinois) along with their youngest brother Henry who later moved to 5507 Bernice Avenue, Portage Park, Chicago. In 1901, when Peter Jr. was twelve years old, he returned home from school and found his mother on the floor, dead. Following this discovery, he pried off his mother's wedding ring, which Peter Sr. had bought for her back in Germany, and pawned it.

After graduating from petty crime into more serious offenses, the Gusenberg brothers teamed up with Dean 'Dion' O'Banion, Earl 'Hymie' Weiss, Vincent 'The Schemer' Drucci, George 'Bugs' Moran and other members of the North Side Gang. Although Peter Jr. and his brother had little formal education, they both learned to speak German and English. He later married a German-Irish woman Myrtle Coppleman Gorman and did not let her know about his criminal activities, keeping her under the ruse that he worked as a travelling salesman. He was first incarcerated in 1902 and sent to the Joliet Correctional Center for burglary in 1906. He was released on a probationary period but violated the terms and conditions of his probation and was sent back to Joliet in 1910 and re-released in 1912. In 1923 he was convicted for his participation in helping rob a mail freight car while stopped at Dearborn Station. He also helped carry out the murders on Antonio Lombardo and Pasquale Lolorado with his younger brother Frank Gusenberg and Albert Kachellek, a fellow cellmate at Joliet. The Gusenberg brothers and Kachellek were killed in the Saint Valentine's Day Massacre February 14, 1929.

== Prison time ==
In the early 1920s, Peter Gusenberg was sent to the United States Penitentiary, Leavenworth on a mail robbery conviction. While he was in prison, the North Side Gang became embroiled in a vicious gang war with the rival Chicago Outfit, headed first by Johnny Torrio and then Al Capone. During this warfare, Outfit gunmen had murdered North Side leader O'Banion in his florist shop. When Peter Gusenberg was released from prison in 1926, he rejoined the North Side Gang, now led by Hymie Weiss, in its war against the Outfit.

== Gang war ==
On September 20, 1926, Peter Gusenberg participated in the infamous drive-by shooting on the Hawthorne Hotel, Capone's Cicero, Illinois headquarters. The North Siders riddled the hotel with thousands of bullets. According to many accounts, the second to last car stopped in front of the hotel restaurant when Peter Gusenberg emerged, clad in a khaki Army shirt and brown overalls, and carrying a Thompson submachine gun. Kneeling in front of the doorway, Gusenberg emptied the entire 100-round capacity drum into the restaurant, and then casually strolled back to his car, which then sped off. The attack left Capone terrified and he offered a truce between the two gangs. Peace talks faltered on the concessions that the North Siders demanded.

As the gang war continued, the North Side Gang started to weaken. Three weeks after the Hawthorne Hotel attack, Hymie Weiss was murdered by a Capone hit squad. Moran now took over the gang. The North Siders especially wanted to kill Jack "Machine Gun" McGurn, as he was rumored to have killed Weiss. On at least two occasions, the Gusenberg brothers tried to kill McGurn. Despite wounding him several times, McGurn survived these attempts on his life.

By late 1928, Moran struck an alliance with Capone rival Joe Aiello. Aiello and the Gusenberg brothers first killed Antonio Lombardo and then Pasqualino "Patsy" Lolordo, two successive presidents of the Unione Siciliane and both Capone allies. It was these murders that motivated Capone to eliminate Moran and the North Side Gang in the Saint Valentine's Day Massacre.

On February 14, 1929, the upper echelon of the North Side gang, including Peter Gusenberg, gathered at the S.M.C. Cartage Company at 2122 N. Clark Street in the Mid-North District neighborhood. Also there were Frank Gusenberg, Albert Weinshank, Adam Heyer, James Clark, John May, and Dr. Reinhardt Schwimmer (a friend of a gang member). The general accepted story is that the North Siders were waiting for a shipment of hijacked Log Cabin brand whiskey from Detroit (a ploy devised by Capone). However, this story has been disputed.

Two men in Chicago police uniforms entered the garage and lined Peter Gusenberg and the other North Siders against the north wall. At this point, two men in civilian clothing entered from the rear carrying submachine guns. The four gunmen then opened fire with submachine guns and shotguns, killing all seven men, in what became known as the St. Valentine's Day Massacre. Peter Gusenberg died kneeling in a chair.

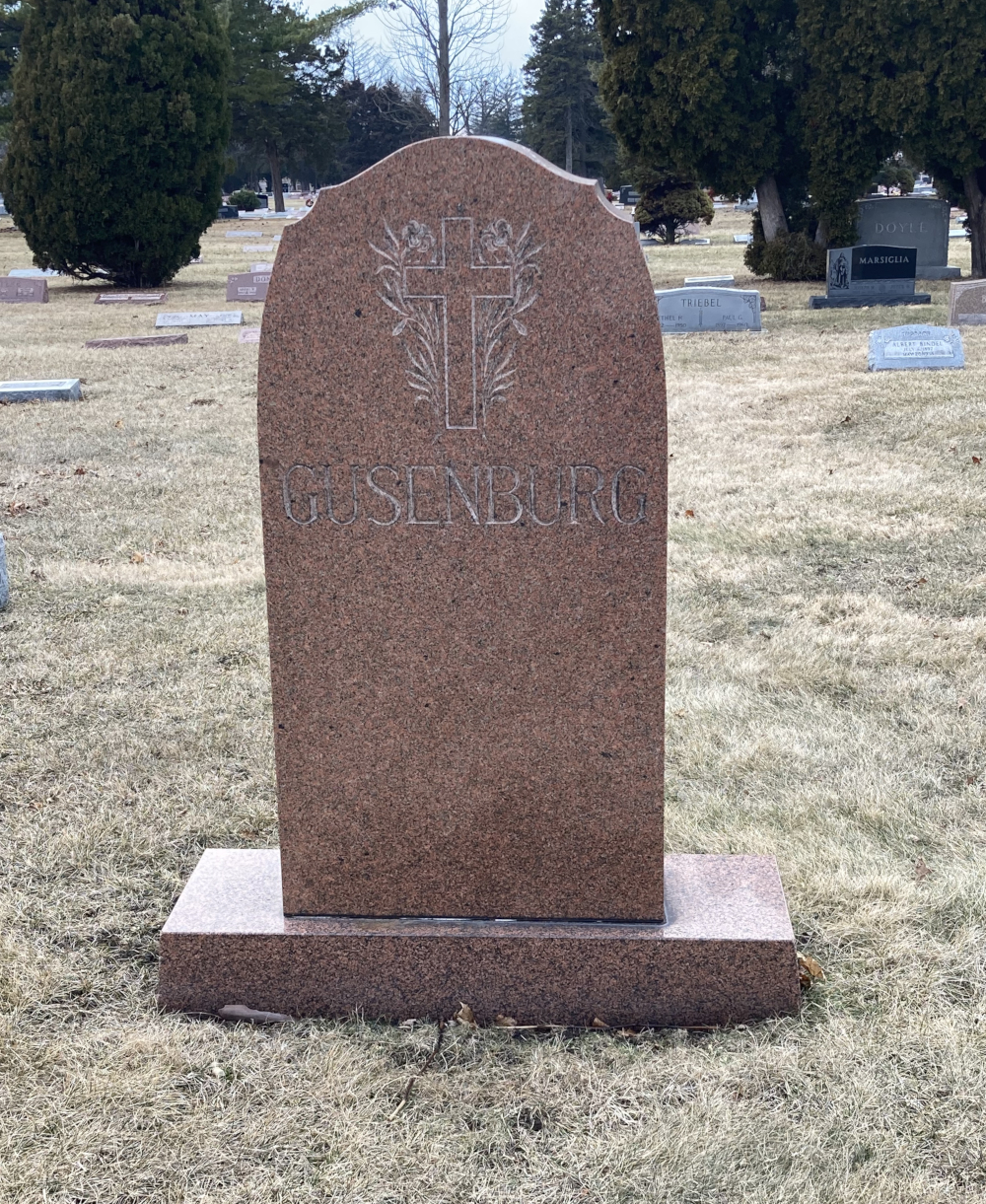
The Gusenbergs' graves at Irving Park Cemetery

Peter's brother Frank was the only initial survivor of the massacre. When police asked who had shot him, Frank replied, "No one shot me." He died later that night. Although the killers wiped out most of the North Side Gang, they missed their prime target, Bugs Moran. Moran had pulled up to the garage just as the shooters were entering. Because they were dressed as policemen, Moran assumed it was a raid and fled the area.

The Gusenberg brothers were initially buried in Rosehill Cemetery in Chicago's North Side. They were later reinterred at Irving Park Cemetery.

== In popular culture ==
Peter has been portrayed three times in film:

- by George Segal in the 1967 film, The St. Valentine's Day Massacre
- by Martin Kove in the 1975 film, Capone.
- by Ryan Kiser in the 2017 film Gangster Land.

The Gusenberg Sweeper is a Grand Theft Auto V version of the Tommy Gun, featured in the Valentine's Day Massacre Special. It is named after the Gusenberg Brothers.
