= The St. Valentine's Day Massacre (film) =

1967 film by Roger Corman

- Theatrical release poster
- Directed by: Roger Corman
- Screenplay by: Howard Browne
- Produced by: Roger Corman
- Starring: Jason Robards; George Segal; Ralph Meeker; Jean Hale
- Narrated by: Paul Frees
- Cinematography: Milton R. Krasner
- Edited by: William B. Murphy
- Music by: Lionel Newman
- Production company: Los Altos Productions
- Distributed by: 20th Century Fox
- Release date: June 30, 1967
- Running time: 100 minutes
- Country: United States
- Language: English
- Budget: $2 million
- Box office: $1.7 million (US/CA)

The St. Valentine's Day Massacre is a 1967 American gangster film based on the 1929 mass murder of seven members of Chicago's Northside Gang (led by George "Bugs" Moran) on orders from Al Capone. The picture was directed by Roger Corman, written by Howard Browne, and starring Jason Robards as Capone, Ralph Meeker as Moran, George Segal as Peter Gusenberg, and David Canary as Frank Gusenberg.

Corman, better known as a director and producer of low-budget B movies, was given his largest budget to date (estimated at $2.5 million) and the backing of 20th Century Fox to realize what he described as "the most accurate, authentic gangster film ever". With a voiceover narration by Paul Frees, the film depicts in detail the events leading up to the massacre in a docudrama-style, with many authentic historical details.

A young Bruce Dern plays one of the victims of the massacre, and Jack Nicholson has a bit part as a gangster. Also featured are Jan Merlin as one of Moran's lieutenants and veteran Corman actors Dick Miller and Leo Gordon as one of the phony policemen involved in the massacre and Heitler, respectively.

A novelization of the film by Boris O'Hare based on Howard Browne's screenplay was published in 1967 by Dell Publishing and released in paperback format.

== Plot ==
An organized crime war breaks out between two rival gangs in Chicago during the Roaring Twenties. The leader of the Southside Gang is the notorious Al Capone, who resents the growing activities of his nemesis George "Bugs" Moran, the leader of the North Side Gang. Moran also wants control of the city's bootlegging and gambling operations, and his lieutenants Peter and Frank Gusenberg use threats and intimidation to make speakeasy owners do business with them in exchange for "protection". Peter Gusenberg also argues and fights with his moll Myrtle, particularly over her extravagant spending of his money.

As the body count escalates (most notably with a failed assassination of Capone hitman Jack McGurn), Capone remembers how Northside leader Hymie Weiss tried to kill him, with a flashback sequence of the September 1926 lunchtime attack on Capone at the Hawthorne Hotel restaurant in Cicero by Weiss and Moran, while Moran reminds his men (also with flashbacks) how Capone had eliminated previous North Side leader Dean O'Banion in November 1924 and Weiss in October 1926. Capone assigns the recovered McGurn the task of eliminating Moran, expressing indifference as to whether or not any of Moran's men are also eliminated. Moran gives the order to have Patsy Lolordo, a crony and personal friend of Capone's who is also the representative of the Sicilian Mafia in Chicago, eliminated in order to replace him with an envoy more sympathetic to Moran. Moran's assassination plan sees him conspire with low-level mafiosi Joe Aiello to kill Lolordo and replace him with Aiello. Lolordo's bodyguards are corrupted, and the unarmed Lolordo is murdered in his apartment. In retaliation, Capone has Aiello tracked down and personally executes him as Aiello is fleeing the state on board a train. (Note: In real life, Aiello was killed over a year later by hitmen.)

With McGurn setting an elaborate plan in motion to eliminate Moran and his gang, Capone retreats to his winter home in Miami to establish an alibi. On the morning of February 14, 1929, two Capone henchmen, dressed as police officers, feign a police raid on the northside garage used by Moran and his gang. Two more Capone hitmen enter carrying Tommy guns, and the four execute five members of Moran's gang, including Peter Gusenberg, using shotguns to eliminate any potential survivors. Also at the garage and victims of the attack are two civilians: mechanic Johnny May and optometrist Reinhardt Schwimmer (who enjoyed being around gangsters). Of the victims, only Peter's brother Frank survives long enough to be taken to a hospital, but despite knowing that he will soon die he refuses to tell the police anything. Moran, the focus of the attack, is not present as he had seen the "police car" approaching the garage and went instead to a diner, thereby escaping certain death. In a press conference at a hospital where he is supposedly being treated for influenza, Moran drops a verbal clue to the crime: "Only Capone kills like that," while Capone, holding a similar press conference in Miami, disparages Moran's sanity and intelligence.

In the aftermath, Capone is shown personally dispatching two of the men who carried out the attack (John Scalise and Albert Anselmi) after he learns of their plans to betray and kill him. Moran is eventually forced out of Chicago and years later dies of lung cancer while in Leavenworth Prison, while Capone, following his release after serving a prison term in Alcatraz, dies of syphilis. No one is ever actually charged for the murders, but those responsible either disappear by going into hiding or are violently killed.

== Cast ==
- Jason Robards as Al Capone
- George Segal as Peter Gusenberg
- Ralph Meeker as George "Bugs" Moran
- Jean Hale as Myrtle Gorman
- Clint Ritchie as Jack McGurn
- Frank Silvera as Nick Sorello
- Joseph Campanella as Albert Wienshank
- Richard Bakalyan as John Scalise
- David Canary as Frank Gusenberg
- Bruce Dern as John May
- Harold J. Stone as Frank Nitti
- Kurt Kreuger as James Clark
- Paul Richards as Charles Fischetti
- Joe Turkel as Jake Gusik
- Milton Frome as Adam Heyer
- John Agar as Dean O'Banion
- Mickey Deems as Reinhardt Schwimmer
- Celia Lovsky as Josephine Schwimmer
- Tom Reese as Ted Newberry
- Jan Merlin as Willie Marks
- Alexander D'Arcy as Joe Aiello
- Reed Hadley as Hymie Weiss
- Gus Trikonis as Rio
- Charles Dierkop as Salvanti
- Tom Signorelli as Bobo Borotto
- Alex Rocco as Diamond
- Leo Gordon as Heitler
- Rico Cattani as Albert Anselmi

=== Uncredited ===
- Dick Miller as Adolph Moeller
- Jonathan Haze as Boris Chapman
- Jack Nicholson as Gino
- Michele Guarini as Patsy Lolardo
- Mary Grace Canfield as Mrs. Doody
- Barboura Morris as Jeanette Landsman
- Joan Shawlee as Edna
- Betsy Jones-Moreland and Buck Taylor as Poolside interviewers

== Production ==
=== Development ===
Roger Corman said he wanted to produce a film about the "gangsterism" that "played a significant role in the development of American culture" but "I wanted to do it honestly, and not in the usual romanticized man-against-the-system."

Corman was drawn to the idea of making a film about the St. Valentine's Day massacre, which had never been the main subject of an entire film (though it had been frequently referenced in other films). Corman said that the massacre was the day that "... changed the whole public face of gangsterism - public outcry broke Capone's stranglehold on society."

The massacre had been the focus of a Playhouse 90 episode, "Seven Against the Wall", broadcast in December 1958 and written by Harold Browne, who had researched the period and the event extensively. Corman hired Browne to write the script for the film. Browne felt that the gangsters were "... complex human beings, shrewd, cunning men whose qualities of leadership, had it been directed into honest channels, might have contributed to this country's history, rather than leaving a scar."

Corman had recently endured an unhappy experience working for Columbia but still wanted to try working at a major studio. In February 1966, he signed on to make the film from Brown's script with Richard Zanuck at 20th Century Fox. Corman later said that Fox had invited him in to pitch ideas, and he had told them about The St. Valentine's Day Massacre and a biopic about the Red Baron, but as Fox had just made The Blue Max, it opted for the gangster film.

Corman made the film following the great success of The Wild Angels. While The Wild Angels had a budget of $350,000, The St. Valentine's Day Massacre was budgeted at $2.5 million. It was the most expensive film that Corman had made. He later claimed that the film cost $1 million and that the rest was studio overhead.

Corman said, "There comes a time when the public conscience needs jolting, and in St. Valentine's Day Massacre this is our intention. It is also certain that the movie will make money - crime is always box office."

Corman wanted classical actors to play gangsters and offered the part of Capone to Orson Welles and that of Bugs Moran to Jason Robards. However, Fox did not want Welles, advising Corman that Welles would try to take over directing; they instead suggested that Robards play Capone. Corman felt that Robards was not physically large enough for the role of Capone and was better suited to play Moran, but did not want to cause trouble after his experience with Columbia and went along with the suggestion.

Corman wanted to cast Jack Nicholson in a key supporting role, but Fox insisted that the director use an actor whom they had under contract. However, Corman did manage to cast Nicholson and Bruce Dern in small roles that were used for the entire length of the shoot, ensuring them a decent payday.

=== Casting ===
Orson Welles was Corman's original choice to play Capone, but Twentieth Century Fox vetoed the deal, fearing that Welles was "undirectable". The film's narration has a style similar to that of Welles but was delivered by actor Paul Frees.

=== Filming ===
Corman originally wanted to shoot the film on location in Chicago but eventually shot it on the Fox backlot. He filmed the massacre scene in a Desilu lot that was converted to resemble the garage where the crime was committed, as the real garage had been demolished by the time the movie started production.

Before filming, Corman found photos of the murder scene. He asked the actors to study the stills before rehearsals and the shoot. After one take, the massacre looked like that of the photos, and each actor's collapse matched the positions in which the victims fell in the real massacre.

The film was one of the few that Corman directed from a major Hollywood studio with a generous budget and an open-ended schedule. However, Corman was disgusted with the great waste of time and money involved with typical film production techniques. He was given a $2.5 million budget and completed the film with $400,000 to spare. Corman, an independent director, was most comfortable in his own style: shoestring budgets and condensed shooting schedules. The shoot took just over seven weeks, though this marked the longest duration for any of Corman's films. "By the end of the movie I was very weary," he said. Nonetheless, the film is generally considered one of his best as a director.

Corman later wrote that "... physically, it is one of the best films I ever directed because I was able to walk around the lot and pick those fantastic sets."

== Reception ==
According to Fox records, the film needed to earn $4,550,000 in rentals to break even and made $4,165,000, meaning it made a loss.

In 2009, Empire magazine named the film #7 in a poll of the 20 Greatest Gangster Movies You've (Probably) Never Seen.

Roger Ebert of the Chicago Sun-Times gave the film 1.5 out of 4 stars, saying attempts at historical accuracy ultimately led to a dull, confusing film: “At the end of this nonsense, to be sure, there is a massacre to brighten things up a little. But then the pall sets in again.”

== Home media ==
The St. Valentine's Day Massacre was released as a Region 1 widescreen DVD by 20th Century Fox Home Entertainment on May 23, 2006. It was issued as a limited-edition region-free Blu-ray by Twilight Time.

== See also ==
- List of American films of 1967

== Notes ==
- Corman, Roger; Jerome, Jim (1988). How I Made a Hundred Movies in Hollywood and Never Lost a Dime. DaCapo Press.
