= Frank Gusenberg =

American mobster (1892–1929)

- CPD mug shot
- Born: October 11, 1893; Lakeview, Chicago, Illinois U.S.
- Died: February 14, 1929 (aged 35); Lincoln Park, Chicago, Illinois, U.S.
- Cause of death: Multiple gunshot wounds
- Resting place: Rosehill Cemetery
- Other names: Tight Lips; Gusenberger; Carl Bloom; Howard Morgan; Fred Gusenberg; Frank Gold Greasy Thumbs
- Occupation: Contract killer
- Years active: 1909-1929
- Relatives: Peter Gusenberg (brother)
- Allegiance: North Side Gang

Frank Gusenberg (October 11, 1893 – February 14, 1929) was an American contract killer and a victim of the Saint Valentine's Day massacre in Chicago, Illinois.

== Early life ==
Born in Lakeview, Chicago, Gusenberg was the second oldest of three sons and one daughter born to Peter Gusenberg Sr. Peter Sr. was a first generation emigrant from Gusenburg, a municipality in today's Trier-Saarburg district, in Rhineland-Palatinate, Germany.

The Gusenbergs lived at 434 Roscoe Street in Lakeview. In 1901, when Gusenberg was eight years old, his elder brother, Peter, found their mother dead in the kitchen of their home. After their mother's death, the boys were raised by their father who was largely absent due to work.

With little parental supervision, Gusenberg and his elder brother Peter began committing petty crimes with Bugs Moran. Gusenberg was first arrested for disorderly conduct in 1909. In 1911, he was convicted of disorderly conduct and sent to the notorious Bridewell Prison in South Lawndale, Chicago. After his release, the Gusenberg brothers and Moran began committing more serious crimes. Between 1909 and 1914, Gusenberg was a suspect in numerous armed robberies and burglaries in the Chicago area.

The Gusenberg brothers and Bugs Moran then joined Dean O'Banion's North Side Gang. They became two of the gang's chief hitmen. After O'Banion was murdered in November 1924, most likely by rival members of the Johnny Torrio-Al Capone organization, the Gusenberg brothers joined Hymie Weiss in getting revenge on the Capone-Torrio Gang. In 1926, Gusenberg was brought up on burglary charges by the state prosecuting attorney's office. For unknown reasons, the charges were never filed.

Gusenberg was a bigamist. He was married to two women simultaneously, Lucille and Ruth, both of whom were unaware of the other.

== The Gusenberg Brothers and the Chicago gang wars ==
Frank Gusenberg participated in the gargantuan drive-by shooting in the North Side performed on Capone's headquarters, the Hawthorne Hotel in Cicero, Illinois, riddling it with thousands of bullets on September 20, 1926. According to many accounts, the second to last car stopped in front of the hotel restaurant where Capone was cowering and Gusenberg's brother, Pete, emerged, clad in a khaki Army shirt, brown overalls, and carrying a Thompson submachine gun fitted with a 100-round capacity drum. Kneeling in front of the doorway, Gusenberg emptied the entire drum into the restaurant, and then casually strolled back to his car, which then sped off to safety.

The attack had apparently worked. Capone was very shaken and requested a sitdown between the two gangs. However, it failed. Hymie Weiss was murdered three weeks later, and over the next couple of years, the North Side Gang continued to weaken.

The North Siders especially wished to kill Jack McGurn, as he was rumored to have been the machine-gunner who killed Weiss. On at least two occasions, the Gusenberg brothers made attempts on his life. Despite receiving several wounds, McGurn survived these attempts. Al Capone had Pasquale "Patsy" Lolordo installed as head of the influential fraternal organization Unione Siciliane.

By late 1928, the leader of the North Side Gang, Bugs Moran, struck an alliance with Al Capone's rival Joe Aiello. The latter, assisted by the Gusenberg brothers, killed Antonio Lombardo and Pasqualino Lolordo, presidents of the Unione Siciliane. It was as a result of these murders that Capone plotted to eliminate Bugs Moran.

== Death ==
On February 14, 1929, members of the North Side gang gathered at a garage behind the offices of S.M.C. Cartage Company. Inside were Pete and Frank Gusenberg, Albert Weinshank, Adam Heyer, James Clark, John May, and Reinhardt Schwimmer (the last two men, May and Schwimmer, were not actually gang members). Five men, possibly members of Capone's Gang, possibly outside "hired guns," most likely a combination of the two, drove to the garage in a stolen police car. Two of the men, dressed as police, entered the garage, pretending they were conducting an ordinary raid, and lined Moran's associates up against the wall. Once the men's backs were all turned, facing the wall, two other men (with civilian clothes) entered the room with machine guns and, along with the "police," opened fire on the seven men, firing seventy bullets into them in what became known as the St. Valentine's Day Massacre.

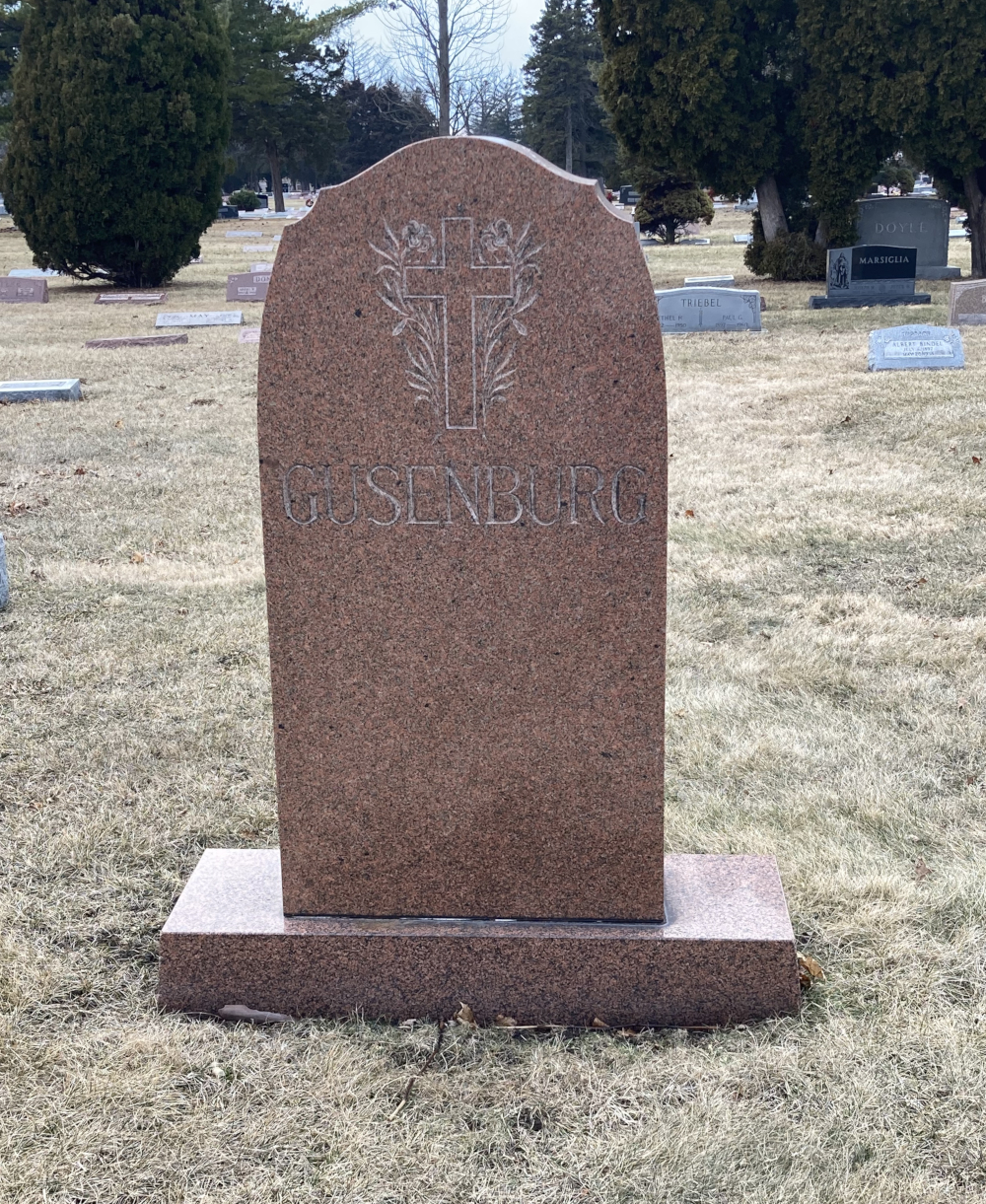
The Gusenbergs' graves at Irving Park Cemetery

When police arrived at the scene, Gusenberg was the only victim still alive despite having been shot fourteen times (reports erroneously list twenty-two times). Among the police was Sergeant Clarence Sweeney who had grown up in the same neighborhood as the Gusenberg brothers and immediately recognized Frank. Sweeney asked Gusenberg, "Who shot you?" Gusenberg, observing the gangland principle of "omertà" (absolute silence) replied, "Nobody shot me."

Gusenberg was then taken to Alexian Brothers Hospital where he was once again asked by Sweeney who shot him. He again refused to answer. Gusenberg's last words reportedly were, "I ain't no copper." Gusenberg died of his wounds three hours after being shot.

The Gusenberg brothers were initially buried in Rosehill Cemetery in Chicago's North Side. They were later reinterred at Irving Park Cemetery.

== In popular culture ==
Frank Gusenberg has been portrayed three times in film:

- by David Canary in the 1967 film, The St. Valentine's Day Massacre
- by Ben Marino in the 1975 film, Capone.
- by Danny Hansen in the 2017 film Gangster Land.

He is also the inspiration for Johnny Tightlips, a recurring character in The Simpsons.
