= The Wings of the Dove (disambiguation) =

The Wings of the Dove is a 1902 novel by Henry James.

The Wings of the Dove may also refer to:

- The Wings of the Dove (1981 film), a French film
- The Wings of the Dove (1997 film), a British-American film
- The Wings of the Dove (Playhouse 90), an American television play
- The Wings of the Dove (opera), an opera by Douglas Moore
- "The Wings of the Dove", an 1827 poem by Felicia Hemans

== See also ==
- Wings of a Dove (disambiguation)
