= Tony Giorgio =

American actor

- Born: Joseph Anthony Giorgio; September 27, 1923; Herkimer, New York, U.S.
- Died: February 1, 2012 (aged 88); Van Nuys, California, U.S.
- Burial place: Forest Lawn Memorial Park (Hollywood Hills)
- Occupations: Actor, magician
- Years active: 1966–2004
- Spouse: Kaye S. Jacobs-Giorgio (1971–2012) (his death)

Joseph Anthony Giorgio (September 27, 1923 – February 1, 2012) was an Italian-American actor and magician and known for his portrayal of Bruno Tattaglia in Francis Ford Coppola's 1972 film The Godfather.

== Career ==
Giorgio was a prolific stage magician and card manipulator. He ran away from home at the age of 12 to join a circus and eventually performed at venues including conventions, fraternal clubs, country clubs, casinos, and film studios. He was hired by Playboy Clubs in the 1960s to be their resident gambling expert, and he gave paid lectures on the nature of confidence games and gambling scams. He was one of the first performers at The Magic Castle nightclub, winning Close-up Magician of the Year in the 1990s.

Giorgio acted in films such as The Godfather (1972), Black Gunn (1972), Magnum Force (1973), Foxy Brown (1974), Capone (1975), Escape to Witch Mountain (1975), The Sting II (1983), The Lonely Guy (1984), Night Train to Terror (1985) and American Me (1992). He also acted in numerous television programs including Mannix, Mission Impossible, Kojak, and The A-Team. In theatre, Giorgio originated the role of 'Big Julie' in the stage musical Guys and Dolls.

== Death ==
On February 1, 2012, aged 88, Giorgio died of heart failure.

== Filmography ==
=== Film ===
- 1966 A Big Hand for the Little Lady as "Steamboat" (uncredited)
- 1968 Sol Madrid as Tall Man (uncredited)
- 1968 The Wrecking Crew as Agent (uncredited)
- 1969 Changes as Joe, Arcade Owner (uncredited)
- 1969 Paint Your Wagon as Card Player (uncredited)
- 1972 The Godfather as Bruno Tattaglia
- 1972 Black Gunn as Ben
- 1973 Harry in Your Pocket as 1st Detective
- 1973 Magnum Force as Frank Palancio
- 1974 Foxy Brown as Eddie
- 1974 Adam-12 11/12/1974 as Bandit
- 1975 Escape to Witch Mountain as Hunter #2
- 1975 Capone as Antonio "Tony The Scourge" Lombardo
- 1978 Record City as Mr. F
- 1983 The Sting II as Rossovich, Macalinski's Man
- 1984 The Lonely Guy as Writer At Party
- 1985 Night Train to Terror as Satan (segment "The Night Train")
- 1987 Cry Wilderness as The Sheriff
- 1992 American Me as Don Antonio Scagnelli
- 1997 My Brother Jack as Rocco

=== Television ===
- 1967 Run for Your Life as Castro; 1 episode
- 1967 Mannix as Sanford; 1 episode
- 1968 The Monkees as Otto; 1 episode
- 1968 The Outcasts as Card Dealer; 1 episode
- 1969-1971 Mission: Impossible as Dealer / Foyer Guard / First Man / Meerghan / Croupier; 7 episodes
- 1970 I Dream of Jeannie as Torpedo; 1 episode
- 1970 Adam 12 as Carjacker in “Child Stealer” episode
- 1971 The Doris Day Show as Ed, The Maître d'; 1 episode
- 1971 Mission Impossible as Croupier; 1 episode
- 1973 Jigsaw as Man; 1 episode
- 1974 Marcus Welby, M.D. as Vito; 1 episode
- 1974 Police Story as Cashier; 1 episode
- 1974 The F.B.I. as M. Giorgio; 1 episode
- 1975 Adam-12 as Michael Funicello; 1 episode
- 1975 Emergency! as Lorenzo; 1 episode
- 1975 Bronk as Killer; 1 episode
- 1975 The Six Million Dollar Man as Abe Collins; 1 episode
- 1975 Kojak as Bill Wilson; 1 episode
- 1975 Switch as Bruno; 1 episode
- 1976 The Bionic Woman as Aaron Creighton; 1 episode
- 1978 Charlie's Angels as Carl; 1 episode
- 1978 Columbo as Harry Parkman; 1 episode
- 1980 Fantasy Island as Croupier; 1 episode
- 1981 B. J. and the Bear as The Magician; 1 episode
- 1981 Hart to Hart as Cheshire; 1 episode
- 1982 Simon & Simon as Sam Boyle; 1 episode
- 1984 Falcon Crest as Croupier; 1 episode
- 1984 The A-Team as Mr. Carlin; 1 episode
- 1985 Hunter as John Vincent; 1 episode
- 1985 Moonlighting as Tony; 1 episode
- 1986 Brothers as Mr. Santini; 1 episode
- 2004 The Practice as Client #1; 1 episode (final appearance)
