= Gangster Land =

- Directed by: Timothy Woodward Jr.
- Written by: Ian Patrick Williams
- Produced by: James Cullen Bressack; Lauren De Normandie; Jarrett Furst; Timothy Woodward Jr.
- Starring: Sean Faris; Milo Gibson; Jason Patric; Jamie-Lynn Sigler; Peter Facinelli
- Cinematography: Pablo Diez
- Edited by: Paul Covington
- Music by: Samuel Joseph Smythe
- Production companies: Status Media & Entertainment
- Distributed by: Cinedigm
- Release date: December 1, 2017
- Running time: 113 minutes
- Country: United States
- Language: English

Gangster Land (also titled In the Absence of Good Men) is a 2017 American action crime drama film directed by Timothy Woodward Jr. and starring Sean Faris, Milo Gibson, Jason Patric, Jamie-Lynn Sigler and Peter Facinelli.

== Plot ==
The film tells the story of Al Capone's rise in the Chicago underworld from the perspective of Jack McGurn. McGurn, the successful amateur boxer, joins the Italian Mafia after the murder of his father and rises within the organization together with his friend Al Capone. Business flourishes, but the Italians and the Irish mafia around Dean "Dion" O'Banion and George "Bugs" Moran begin a fierce battle for criminal supremacy in the Chicago underworld, culminating in the so-called Saint Valentine's Day Massacre.

== Cast ==
- Milo Gibson as Al Capone
- Sean Faris as Jack "Machine Gun" McGurn
- Jason Patric as Detective Reed
- Jamie-Lynn Sigler as Lulu Rolfe
- Peter Facinelli as George "Bugs" Moran
- Mark Rolston as Dean "Dion" O'Bannion
- Michael Paré as Captain O'Connor
- Sean Kanan as Detective Boyle
- Al Sapienza as Giovanni "Johnny" Torrio
- Tom Noga as Angelo Demory
- Don Harvey as Detective Landa
- Jean Kauffman as Josephine Demory
- Jason Brooks as FBI Agent Wilson
- Ronnie Kerr as Franklin "Frank" Rio
- Drake Andrew as John Scalise
- Ryan Kiser as Peter Gusenberg
- Louis Fasanaro as Albert Anselmi
- Danny Hansen as Frank Gusenberg
- Kevin Donovan as Ben Feldman

== Production ==
On June 14, 2017, it was announced that Jason Patric joined the cast of the film. Gangster Landmarks the debut of Mel Gibson's son, Milo Gibson, as the lead actor in a movie.

== Release ==
The film was released in theaters and on VOD on December 1, 2017.

== Reception ==
Dennis Harvey of Variety gave the film a negative review and wrote, "Given the gradually upticking arc of his opuses’ IMDb ratings to date, Woodward should finally score a 6 out of 10 sometime next year. He's got the perspiration part down; surely inspiration can't hold out much longer."

The Hollywood Reporter also gave the film a negative review and wrote, "Respectable period production values and some recognizable castmembers are no substitute for imagination in this flat crime flick, which steals freely from its predecessors but offers none of their guilty-pleasure thrills."

Noel Murray of the Los Angeles Times gave a negative review and wrote, "The ideal audience for Gangster Land would be someone who’s never seen The Untouchables or Boardwalk Empire … or, heck, even Guys and Dolls or Bugsy Malone."
