= Midtown Chicago =

Midtown Chicago may refer to:

- Lincoln Park, Chicago, a "community area" in the American city of Chicago, Illinois, or more specifically;
  - Midtown North District, a historic district in the Lincoln Park community area of Chicago
- Lake View, Chicago, another "community area"
