= Joe Turkel =

American actor (1927–2022)

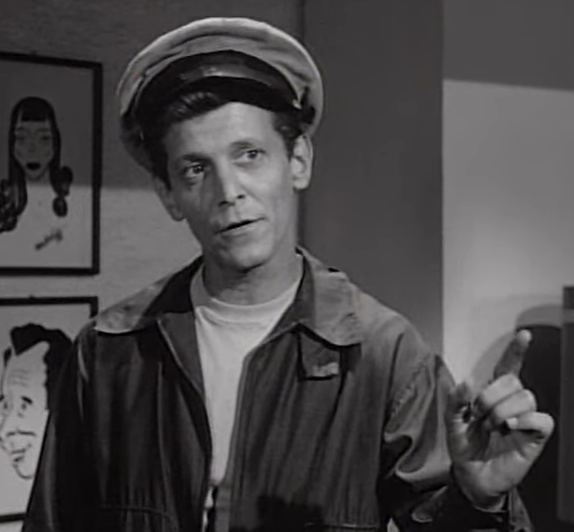
- Turkel in Tormented (1960)
- Born: Joseph Turkel; July 15, 1927; New York City, New York, U.S.
- Died: June 27, 2022 (aged 94); Santa Monica, California, U.S.
- Occupation: Actor
- Years active: 1948–1997
- Spouse: Anita Josephine Cacciatore
- Children: 2

Joseph Turkel (July 15, 1927 – June 27, 2022) was an American character actor who starred in film and television during the Golden Age of Hollywood in the 1950s and 1960s. He is best known for his roles in Stanley Kubrick's films The Killing (1956), Paths of Glory (1957), and The Shining (1980), and as Dr. Eldon Tyrell in Blade Runner (1982). He also had roles in three of Bert I. Gordon's films.

== Early life ==
Turkel was born in Brooklyn on July 15, 1927, to Benjamin Turkel (1899–1988), who was a tailor, and Gazella (née Goldfisher; 1899–1997), a homemaker and occasional opera singer. His parents were Polish Jewish immigrants. He had two brothers, Harold and David. Turkel joined the United States Army when he was seventeen and served in the European Theater of Operations during World War II.

== Career ==
Turkel's first film appearance was 1948's City Across the River. His other film appearances include Bert I. Gordon's The Boy and the Pirates as Abu the Genie, Tormented as Nick (both 1960), and Village of the Giants (1965) as the sheriff; as a gangster-sidekick in The Purple Gang (1959); a prisoner of war named "Dino" in the 1965 POW movie King Rat; The Sand Pebbles (1966) as Bronson; The St. Valentine's Day Massacre (1967) as Chicago gangster Jake "Greasy Thumb" Guzik; and the 1990 horror feature The Dark Side of the Moon.

Turkel appeared on the television series The Life and Legend of Wyatt Earp as Jim Rellance on November 13, 1956. His other television appearances include Sky King (in the 1957 episode "Mystery Horse"), Frontier Doctor, Bat Masterson, U.S. Marshal, Adam-12, The Asphalt Jungle, Mackenzie's Raiders, Kojak, Tales from the Darkside, and Miami Vice (in the episode "Indian Wars"). He also appeared on Bonanza three times, including the 1961 episode "The Many Faces of Gideon Flinch", playing one of two of Bullet Head Burke's right-hand men.

Turkel's best known roles are Lloyd, the ghostly bartender in Stanley Kubrick's The Shining (1980) and Dr. Eldon Tyrell, the android manufacturer in Ridley Scott's Blade Runner (1982). He was one of only two actors (the other being Philip Stone) to have worked with Kubrick as a credited character three times. The other appearances were in The Killing (1956, as Tiny), and in Paths of Glory (1957, as Private Arnaud), He retired from acting after reprising his role of Eldon Tyrell in the 1997 Blade Runner video game.

== Personal life ==
As of 1999, Turkel lived in Southern California and wrote screenplays. He said in a 2014 interview that Paths of Glory was his favorite among his films. Prior to his death, Turkel wrote a memoir, The Misery of Success, scheduled for a now-posthumous 2022 release.

Turkel was married to Anita Josephine Cacciatore, with whom he had two sons. When he attended a 2011 rally in Occupy Seattle, he referred to himself as a "liberal progressive Democrat".

Turkel died at the age of 94 from liver failure on June 27, 2022, at Saint John's Health Center in Santa Monica, California.

== Filmography ==
- City Across the River (1949) – Shimmy Stockton
- Johnny Stool Pigeon (1949) – Bellboy (uncredited)
- Sword in the Desert (1949) – Haganah Soldier (uncredited)
- Angels in Disguise (1949) – Johnny Mutton
- Lucky Losers (1950) – Johnny Angelo
- Federal Man (1950) – Jack "Sneeze" Norton
- Triple Trouble (1950) – Benny the Blood
- Southside 1-1000 (1950) – Frankie
- Halls of Montezuma (1951) – Marine (uncredited)
- Fixed Bayonets! (1951) – Soldier (uncredited)
- Starlift (1951) – Litter Case (uncredited)
- Down Among the Sheltering Palms (1952) – Pvt. Harris (uncredited)
- The Glass Wall (1953) – Freddie Zakoyla
- A Slight Case of Larceny (1953) – Holdup Man (uncredited)
- Man Crazy (1953) – Ray
- Duffy of San Quentin (1954) – Frank Roberts
- Gypsy Colt (1954) – Chuck (uncredited)
- Return from the Sea (1954) – Sailor (uncredited)
- The Human Jungle (1954) – Delinquent Hood (uncredited)
- The Bamboo Prison (1954) – P.O.W. (uncredited)
- Cell 2455, Death Row (1955) – Curly (uncredited)
- Mad at the World (1955) – Pete Johnson
- The Naked Street (1955) – Shimmy
- Lucy Gallant (1955) – One of Casey's Air Force Buddies (uncredited)
- Inside Detroit (1956) – Pete Link
- The Killing (1956) – Tiny
- The Proud and Profane (1956) – Patient with Cards (uncredited)
- Friendly Persuasion (1956) – Poor Loser (uncredited)
- The Shadow on the Window (1957) – Lounger (uncredited)
- Hellcats of the Navy (1957) – Chick
- Beau James (1957) – Reporter (uncredited)
- The Midnight Story (1957) – Lothario at Dance (uncredited)
- Jeanne Eagels (1957) – Eddie, Reporter (uncredited)
- House of Numbers (1957) – Bradville – Convict (uncredited)
- Paths of Glory (1957) – Private Pierre Arnaud
- The Beast of Budapest (1958) – Martin
- The Bonnie Parker Story (1958) – Chuck Darrow
- The Case Against Brooklyn (1958) – Henchman Monte
- Verboten! (1959) – Infantryman
- Warlock (1959) – Chet Haggin (uncredited)
- Here Come the Jets (1959) – Henley
- The Purple Gang (1959) – Eddie Olsen
- Visit to a Small Planet (1960) – Malcolm (uncredited)
- The Boy and the Pirates (1960) – Abu the Genie
- Tormented (1960) – Nick, The Blackmailer
- Bat Masterson (1960) – Fargo
- Portrait of a Mobster (1961) – Joe Noe
- East Side/West Side (1963) – Richard Bailey
- The Yellow Canary (1963) – Policeman
- The Carpetbaggers (1964) – Reporter (uncredited)
- Combat! (1964) – Pvt. Klimmer
- Village of the Giants (1965) – Sheriff
- King Rat (1965) – Dino
- The Sand Pebbles (1966) – Seaman Bronson
- The St. Valentine's Day Massacre (1967) – Jake "Greasy Thumb" Guzik
- The Rat Patrol (1967) – Capt. Bruener
- The Devil's 8 (1969) – Sam
- Five Savage Men (1970) – Peyote
- Wild in the Sky (1972) – Corazza
- Six Hundred and Sixty–Six (1972) – Col. Ferguson
- Cycle Psycho (1973) – Harry
- The Prisoner of Second Avenue (1975) – Man Upstairs (uncredited)
- The Hindenburg (1975) – Detective Moore
- The Commitment (1976) – Jules
- Which Way Is Up? (1977) – Harry Boatwright
- The Shining (1980) – Lloyd the bartender
- Blade Runner (1982) – Dr. Eldon Tyrell
- Miami Vice, episode 415: Indian Wars (1988) – Levec
- The Dark Side of the Moon (1990) – Paxton Warner
- Blade Runner (1997) – Dr. Eldon Tyrell (voice, final role)
