= Irving Park Cemetery =

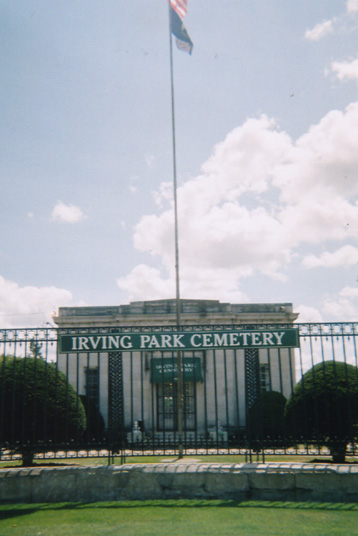
- The front gates of Irving Park Cemetery
- Interactive map of Irving Park Cemetery

Details
- Established: 1918
- Location: Chicago, Illinois
- Country: United States
- Coordinates: 41°56′59″N 87°49′23″W
- Owned by: Dignity Memorial
- Website: https://www.dignitymemorial.com/funeral-homes/illinois/chicago/irving-park-cemetery/6238
- Find a Grave: Irving Park Cemetery

Irving Park Cemetery is a landscaped cemetery located at 7777 West Irving Park Road in Chicago, Illinois. Its first interment was in July 1918. Situated at the edge of Chicago, this landscaped cemetery is one of three adjacent cemeteries established near Irving Park Road in the early twentieth century. It is notable for being the burial place of the Gusenberg brothers, Frank and Peter, who were killed in the Saint Valentine's Day Massacre on February 14, 1929.

== Notable burials ==
- Kay Armen – (1915–2011), singer and actress
- Carmel Henry Carfora – (1878–1958), bishop of the Old Catholic church
- Fred Goetz – (1897–1934), organized crime figure
- Frank Gusenberg – (1893–1929), organized crime figure
- Peter Gusenberg – (1888–1929), organized crime figure
- Albert Kachellek – (1890–1929), organized crime figure
