= Face of a Hero (Playhouse 90) =

- Playhouse 90 episode
- Jack Lemmon in "Face of a Hero"
- Episode no.: Season 3 Episode 13
- Directed by: John Frankenheimer
- Written by: Robert L. Joseph (adaptation), Pierre Boulle (novel)
- Original air date: January 1, 1959
- Running time: 1:29:55

Guest appearances
- Jack Lemmon as David Poole; Rip Torn as Harold Rutland; James Gregory as Chief Fuller

Episode chronology
← Previous "The Nutcracker"	Next → "The Wings of the Dove"

"Face of a Hero" is an American television play broadcast on January 1, 1959 as part of the CBS television series, Playhouse 90. John Frankenheimer was the director and John Houseman the producer. The cast included Jack Lemmon and Rip Torn.

== Plot ==
Prosecutor David Poole is pressured to seek the death penalty for a murder committed by Harold Rutland, the son of a wealthy man. Poole knows that the death was an accident because he was present, but out of sight, at the time and saw that the victim was inebriated and fell from the bluff. In his grief, Rutland falsely confesses to murder. Rather than ruin his own reputation by telling what he saw, Poole proceeds with the prosecution and does so with zeal.

== Cast ==
Dana Wynter hosted the broadcast. The cast includes the following.

- Jack Lemmon as David Poole
- James Gregory as Leo Fuller
- Rip Torn as Harold Rutland
- William Hansen as Dr. Milliard
- Henry Hull as Victor Bishop
- Larry Gates as Senator Knox
- Anne Meacham as Catherine Poole
- Whit Bissell as Mayor Chandos
- Malcolm Atterbury as Simon DeGrange
- Charles Aidman as Morrell
- Stanley Adams as Perry Cates
- Byron Foulger as Dr. Spring
- Carol Kelly as Mrs. McDermott
- Leonard Bell as the Defense Attorney
- Burt Reynolds as Gordon
- Florida Friebus as Aunt Louisa
- Jamie Forster as The Judge
- Marilyn Moe as Milly Bishop
- Lois Kimbrell as Miss Grant

== Production ==
The program aired on January 1, 1959, on the CBS television series Playhouse 90. John Houseman was the producer and John Frankenheimer the director. Robert L. Joseph wrote the teleplay based on the novel La Face (1956) by Pierre Boulle.

== Reception ==
John P. Shanley of The New York Times called it "a competent dramatization" told in "provocative terms", though the production moved at a pace that "sometimes was too swift." He added that Jack Lemmon gave "a convincing performance".
