= Gregg G. Tallas =

Greek film director and editor

Gregg G. Tallas (Greek: Γκρέκ Τάλλας, born Γρηγόρης Θαλασσινός, Grigoris Thalassinos; January 25, 1909, Athens, Greece – February 1, 1993, Athens) was a film director and film editor. He first worked for Fritz Lang in 1933, as the associate film editor for The Testament of Dr. Mabuse.

== Filmography ==
=== As director ===
- 1985: Night Train to Terror
- 1980: Cataclysm (as Greg Tallas)
- 1968: Kataskopoi ston Saroniko/ Assignment Skybolt
- 1967: Bikini Paradise
- 1965: Marc Mato, agente S. 077
- 1962: Katigoroumenos... o eros (as Gregg Tallas)
- 1958: Apagorevmeni agapi (as Gregg Tallas)
- 1957: Agioupa, to koritsi tou kampou
- 1953: To xypolito tagma /The Barefoot Battalion
- 1950: Prehistoric Women (as Gregory G. Tallas)
- 1949: Siren of Atlantis (as Gregg G.Tallas)
