= Night Train to Terror =

1985 American anthology horror film

- Theatrical release poster
- Directed by: Jay Schlossberg-Cohen (Note: Segment: "The Night Train"); John Carr (Note: Segment: "The Case of Harry Billings") (Note: Segment: "The Case of Gretta Connors"); Phillip Marshak (Note: Segment: "The Case of Claire Hansen"); Tom McGowan; Gregg C. Tallas
- Written by: Philip Yordan
- Produced by: Jay Schlossberg-Cohen
- Starring: John Phillip Law; Cameron Mitchell; Richard Moll; Marc Lawrence
- Cinematography: Frank Byers; Art Fitzsimmons; Susan Maljan; Bruce Markoe; Byron Wardlaw
- Edited by: Bruce Markoe; Phillip Marshak; Steve Nielson; Evan A. Stoliar
- Music by: Eddy Lawrence Manson
- Production company: Visto International
- Distributed by: Visto International
- Release date: January 25, 1985 (Knoxville, Tennessee)
- Running time: 98 minutes
- Country: United States
- Language: English

Night Train to Terror is a 1985 American anthology horror film written by Philip Yordan and directed by Jay Schlossberg-Cohen, with segments directed by John Carr, Phillip Marshak, Tom McGowan, and Gregg C. Tallas. The film features three separate stories, presented through a frame narrative in which God and Satan view and debate the fates of the characters contained within them.

The three interior segments that comprise Night Train to Terror were shot years prior and were originally intended as standalone features, but went either unreleased or unfinished.

== Plot ==
God and Satan are on a train headed to Las Vegas, disputing what they each offer to humankind. Also aboard the train is a group of young people having a party. God and Satan discuss the fate of three individuals as they watch their stories unfold.

In the first story, "The Case of Harry Billings", salesmen Harry Billings is an alcoholic and hedonist who accidentally kills his wife while driving recklessly. He is taken to a mysterious psychiatric hospital where is placed under hypnosis by a Dr. Fargo and Dr. Brewer. A young couple stop there to use the phone after becoming lost, and are kidnapped and murdered by Otto, an orderly. Meanwhile, the staff use a hypnotized Harry to lure various people to the hospital, including a bartender and a young woman, only to be brutally murdered. The victims' corpses are then used for organ harvesting. Dr. Fargo turns on Brewer, spiking his drink with a sedative. Dr. Fargo lobotomizes Brewer, leaving her in sole control of Harry, with whom she has become romantically involved. Harry defies Fargo and kills Otto while attempting to escape. Meanwhile, a lobotomized Brewer enacts revenge by performing vivisection on Fargo.

The second story, "The Case of Gretta Connors", follows the young Gretta, a struggling aspiring actress working at an amusement park, who meets and falls in love with the austere middle-aged George Youngmeyer. George exploits Gretta by forcing her into pornographic films. Glenn Marshall, a medical school student, becomes enamored of Gretta after seeing one of her films, and tracks her to a Manhattan bar owned by George, where she performs as a pianist. The two fall in love, and a jealous George enacts a revenge plot by recruiting the two into a death cult of which he is a member. The cult subjects Glenn to various Russian roulette-style death games. When Gretta and Glenn are to be married, George kidnaps them and subjects them to another death game using a wrecking ball, but the game ends in one of the cultists dying instead.

In the third story, "The Case of Claire Hansen", Claire is a devout Catholic surgeon plagued by nightmares about Nazis. Meanwhile, police Lieutenant Stern attempts to help the elderly Abraham Weiss track down a group of Nazis who murdered his family during the Holocaust, and whom Weiss believes fled to the United States during World War II, where they assumed new identities. Stern is skeptical of Weiss's claims, as the individuals Weiss identifies do not appear to have aged since 1944. Weiss takes it upon himself to enact revenge by tracking the group to a large mansion, but is killed after encountering a demonic-looking woman. Claire later performs Weiss's autopsy, and finds a mysterious "666" tattoo on his abdomen, indicating the mark of the beast. Claire's atheist scientist husband is met by Papini, a man branded with this tattoo, but her husband dismisses him. Papini attempts to stop the Nazi group—who are in fact a cult of demonic apprentices to the Devil—but is captured by a monstrous creature and dragged into the earth. The cult begins preying on Claire's husband, luring him to an island to meet with their leader, Olivier. He is killed when he refuses to accept Satan as his master. Later, Claire hits Olivier with her car near the cult's mansion. At the hospital, she performs a surgery on him, during which her assistant is compelled to kill him, and stabs him on the operating table. Realizing Olivier is a servant of the Devil, the women begin to remove his organs as he flies into a violent rage. Olivier remanifests in the operating room, his body restored, and Claire observes that the vivisected body on the table is now that of her assistant, dead. Claire screams in horror as a coiffed Olivier walks out of the hospital.

On the train, God and Satan vie for control of the fate of its passengers; Satan plans to crash the train and send all its unwitting passengers' souls to hell. Satan causes the train to derail, apparently killing everyone aboard, but God intervenes and, instead, the train is seen ascending a track into the sky.

== Cast ==
"The Night Train"

- Gabriel Whitehouse as Conductor
- Tony Giorgio as Satan
- Ferdy Mayne as God

"The Case of Harry Billings"

- John Phillip Law as Harry Billings
- Richard Moll as Otto, an orderly
- Eva Hesse as Harry's Wife
- Sharon Ratcliff as Dr. Fargo
- Arthur M. Braham as Dr. Brewer
- Lisa Watkins as Verna

"The Case of Gretta Connors"

- J. Martin Sellers as George Youngmeyer
- Merideth Haze as Gretta Connors
- Rick Barnes as Glenn Marshall
- Mark Ridley as Prince Flubutu
- William Charles as Federico Schmidt

"The Case of Claire Hansen"

- Cameron Mitchell as Lieutenant Stern
- Marc Lawrence as Dieter / Mr. Weiss
- Richard Moll as James Hansen
- Faith Clift as Claire Hansen
- Robert Bristol as Olivier
- Maurice Grandmaison as Papini

== Production ==
Night Train to Terror was created using the salvaged footage of three other unreleased horror films that had been shot years prior. The first story, "The Case of Henry Billings", features footage from the unfinished film Scream Your Head Off (1981), directed by John Carr. The second segment, "The Case of Gretta Connors", was originally a feature film titled Death Wish Club (1983), which had the working titles The Dark Side of Love, Carnival of Fools, and Gretta. The third story, "The Case of Claire Hansen", originated from the unreleased film Cataclysm (1980) directed by Phillip Marshak, Tom McGowan, and Gregg C. Tallas, which had the alternate working titles The Nightmare Never Ends and Satan's Supper.

Parts of the film were shot in Salt Lake City, Utah as well as La Jolla and San Diego, California.

In the end credits, Satan is credited as being played by "Lu Sifer" and God by "Himself".

== Release ==
The film was given a limited release theatrically by Visto International in 1985, opening regionally in Knoxville, Tennessee on January 25, 1985.

=== Critical response ===
In his book Bonkers Ass Cinema (2022), Matt Rotman writes: "Clever, clunky, and wildly bonkers, the failed experiment of Night Train to Terror is an exhilarating experience. Scenes transition nonsensically. Actors mysteriously change hair lengths. Claymation monsters on the level of Winterbeast (1992) wreak havoc on clay-ified characters. [And] a new wave band sings and dances in a train car, playing the same song over and over for an hour and a half."

=== Home media ===
The film was first released on DVD and Blu-ray in October 2014 by Vinegar Syndrome. Extras for the film include the full-length version of Greta (aka Death Wish Club), an interview with producer/director Jay Schlossberg-Cohen, an interview with assistant editor Wayne Schmidt, and a commentary track by J. A. Kerswell.

== Legacy ==
Since its release, Night Train to Terror has been described as an infamous cult classic of grade-Z movie fare.

== Sources ==
- D'Arc, James V. (2010). When Hollywood Came to Town: A History of Moviemaking in Utah (First ed.). Layton, Utah: Gibbs Smith. ISBN 978-1-423-60587-4.
- Mitchell, Charles P. (2002). The Devil on Screen: Feature Films Worldwide. Jefferson, North Carolina: McFarland. ISBN 978-1-476-60533-3.
- Rotman, Matt (2022). Bonkers Ass Cinema. Orlando, Florida: Bear Manor Media. ISBN 978-1-629-33945-0.
- Van Scott, Miriam (1999). The Encyclopedia of Hell. New York City, New York: St. Martin's Griffin. ISBN 978-0-31224-442-2.
- Weldon, Michael (1996). The Psychotronic Video Guide To Film. New York City, New York: Macmillan. ISBN 978-0-31213-149-4.
