= The Nutcracker (Playhouse 90) =

- Playhouse 90 episode
- Candy canes dancing in hula hoops in "The Nutcracker"
- Episode no.: Season 3 Episode 12
- Directed by: Ralph Nelson
- Based on: The Nutcracker by Pyotr Ilyich Tchaikovsky
- Original air date: December 25, 1958
- Running time: 1:30

Guest appearances
- June Lockhart as narrator; Diana Adams as Sugar Plum Fairy; Allegra Kent as Dewdrop

Episode chronology
← Previous "Seven Against the Wall"	Next → "Face of a Hero"

"The Nutcracker" was a special Christmas presentation of the CBS television series, Playhouse 90, featuring Tchaikovsky's ballet performed by the New York City Ballet, choreographed by George Balanchine, and conducted by Robert Irving. It was broadcast live and in color on December 25, 1958.

== Cast ==
The cast performed the following roles.

- June Lockhart as narrator
- Diana Adams as Sugar Plum Fairy
- Allegra Kent as Dewdrop
- Judith Green as Marzipan Sheperdess
- Arthur Mitchell as Coffee
- Roy Tobias as Chocolate
- Barbara Walczak as Chocolate
- Kenneth Peterson as Mouse King
- Deni Lamont as Tea
- Edward Villella as Candy Cane
- Una Kai as Frau Silberhaus
- Roland Vazquez as Dr. Silberhaus
- Shaun O'Brien as Party Guest
- Bern Bennett as Announcer
- Debbie Paine as Clara
- Robert Maiorano as Her Prince

== Production ==
The program aired on December 25, 1958, on the CBS television series Playhouse 90. John Houseman was the producer and Ralph Nelson the director. George Balanchine was the choreographer (this was an adaptation of the version he first staged in 1954), and Robert Irving conducted the New York City Ballet Orchestra. E. T. A. Hoffmann wrote the television adaptation based on the original narration by Leo Lerman. The broadcast was sponsored by Kimberly-Clark and the American Gas Association. This was the only installment of the entire Playhouse 90 series to be broadcast in color. The videotaped broadcast has been uploaded to YouTube.
