= Jake Guzik =

American mobster (1886–1956)

- Born: 20 March 1886; Kraków, Kingdom of Galicia and Lodomeria, Austria-Hungary
- Died: 21 February 1956 (aged 69); Chicago

Jake (or Jack) "'Greasy Thumb" Guzik (March 20, 1886 – February 21, 1956) was the financial and legal advisor, and later political "greaser," for the Chicago Outfit.

== Early life ==
Guzik was born on March 20, 1886 to parents Max Guzik and Mamie Zeitlin Guzik. In 1892 the Guziks moved to Chicago, Illinois where Max owned a cigar store. On 13 April 1907 Jake married Rose Lipschultz in Lake County, Indiana. By 1910 his older brother Harry began involvement in organized crime and came into ownership of a brothel which Guzik and his other brother Sam worked in.

== Chicago Outfit ==
In 1922 when working under Johnny Torrio, Guzik and Al Capone met for the first time. In 1929 he attended the mob's national Atlantic City conference.

In the early 1920s, Guzik, supposedly overhearing a plan to murder Al Capone, informed him and later allied with the Chicago Outfit. Starting under Capone, Guzik was the trusted treasurer and financial wizard of the Outfit. Guzik worked for Capone, and later Paul "the Waiter" Ricca and Tony Accardo. Because Guzik was incapable of using a gun or killing anyone, Capone protected him and once killed a man for him. In May 1924, Guzik got into an argument with a freelance hijacker named Joe Howard, who slapped and kicked him around. Incapable of physical resistance, Guzik related to Capone what had happened. Capone charged out in search of Howard and ran him down in Heinie Jacob's saloon on South Wabash Avenue, where Howard was bragging about the way he had "made the little Jew whine." When Howard saw Capone, he held out his hand and said, "Hello, Al." Capone instead grabbed Howard's shoulders and shook him violently, demanding to know why Howard had mistreated his friend. "Go back to your girls, you dago pimp," Howard replied. Capone then wordlessly drew a revolver, jammed it into his face, and, after several seconds, emptied it into him.

As his most prized treasurer, Guzik became one of the most important figures in Capone's criminal organization. Historian Robert M. Lombardo referred to him as "the most important Jewish gangster in Chicago history". When Capone was imprisoned in 1929 he regularly made long-distance telephone calls to Guzik, who also came to visit him. In 1930 he was convicted of tax fraud, receiving a five year sentence. After three years and eight months he was released.

Capone quickly came to trust Guzik's advice in the various gang wars that developed as he tried to organize Chicago. Guzik also served as the mob's principal bagman in payoffs to police and politicians, hence the origin of the nickname Greasy Thumb. Years later, as Capone was in failing health, it was Guzik who saw to it that Capone and his family never wanted for anything.

=== Later life ===
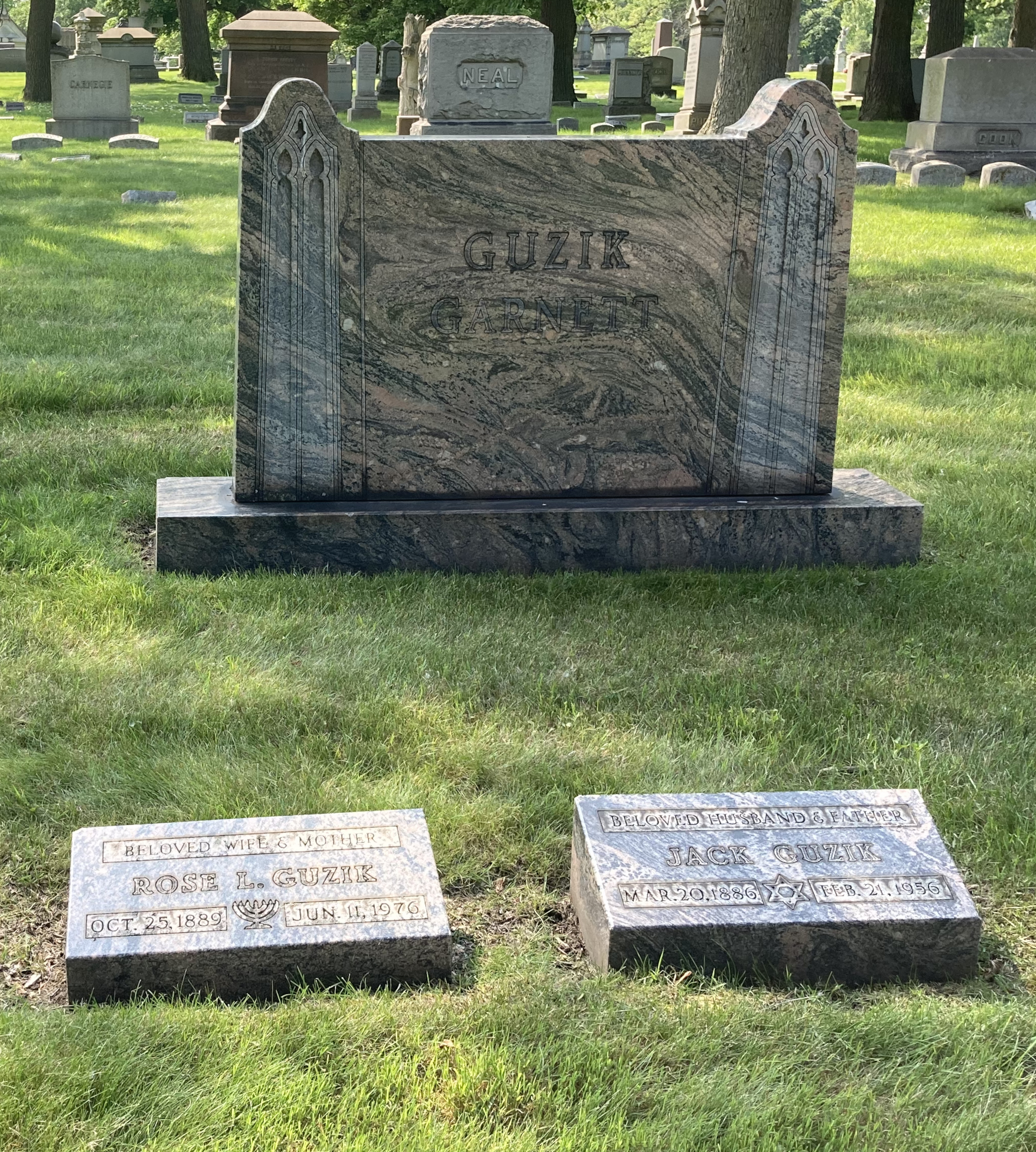
Guzik's grave at Oak Woods Cemetery

During the 1940s and 1950s, when the national syndicate was dominated by the Big Six, Guzik and Accardo flew east weekly to meet with the other heads of the organization: Joe Adonis, Frank Costello, Meyer Lansky and Longy Zwillman. The only serious legal problems that Guzik ever faced were with the IRS, and he eventually spent a few years in prison. At the Kefauver Committee hearings, he pleaded the Fifth Amendment on the grounds that any response to the questions might "discriminate against me." When asked his occupation he replied that he was retired and when asked what he was retired from replied "I won't answer that".

After the murder of James Ragen in 1946, Guzik was brought in for questioning, being held for two hours. The two officers who brought Guzik in, Lieutenant William Drury and Captain Thomas E. Connelly, were later fired by the force and sued by Guzik for allegedly violating his civil liberties. The charges were dismissed by a grand jury. In the final years of his life Guzik was a frequent litigator. With the help of the American Civil Liberties Union he brought a $50,000 damage suit against the police when he was forced to walk up several flights of stairs at Canalport police station, despite his heart condition, when he was arrested in course of an investigation. He also sued the Chicago American after it described him as "Dean Jake of Old Scarface U.", "Gangland's Fearless Fosdick" and "Chief Panderer". The case was dismissed by Judge Salmon who noted "Failure of the plaintiff to allege that said statements were false must be considered as a tacit admission that they were true". He was among the small amount of mourners to attend Capone's funeral in 1947.

Guzik died of a myocardial infarction on February 21, 1956, while in St Hubert's Olde English Inn, in the South Loop, his regular meeting place. His associates in the Outfit, not wanting the location to be publicly associated with Outfit activities, moved his body to the South Side Chicago apartment that he rented under the name Jack Arnold, before reporting the death. He was 69. His funeral was attended by Alderman John D'Arco Sr. and also individuals from the Chicago Outfit. Al Capone's brother Manny, Capone's wife Mae, and Tony Accardo were all in attendance. Rabbi Noah Ganze delivered a twenty minute eulogy, in which he described Guzik as a man who "never lost faith in God. Hundreds benefited from his kindness and generosity. His charities were performed quietly. And he made frequent and vast contributions to my congregation". According to Guzik's probate he had only $10,000 in cash when he died, which he left to his wife.

== In television ==
Jake Guzik is a major figure in the 1959 television show The Untouchables, wherein he is portrayed by Nehemiah Persoff. Guzik was introduced in the two-hour pilot, in which he was portrayed by Bern Hoffman, and returned in the first episode as the brains behind the Chicago Outfit after Al Capone's conviction. He ultimately appeared in three episodes, portrayed by Persoff in all three.

In the film The St. Valentine’s Day Massacre (1967) he is portrayed by Joe Turkel, and by Peter Maloney in Capone (1975). Jake Guzik appears in the HBO show Boardwalk Empire, wherein he is portrayed by Joe Caniano. His incident with Joe Howard was dramatized in an episode.
