= Wings of a Dove =

Wings of a Dove may refer to:

- "Wings of a Dove" (Bob Ferguson song), also recorded by Ferlin Husky
- "Wings of a Dove" (Van Dyke Parks song), recorded by Brian Wilson on his album Orange Crate Art
- "Wings of a Dove" (Madness song)
- "On the Wings of a Dove" (Ghost Whisperer), an episode of the TV series Ghost Whisperer
- Hear My Prayer, a Christian anthem well known for the line "O for the wings, for the wings of a dove!"
