= The Wings of the Dove (Playhouse 90) =

- Playhouse 90 episode
- John Baragrey and Dana Wynter in "The Wings of the Dove"
- Episode no.: Season 3 Episode 14
- Directed by: Robert Stevens
- Written by: Meade Roberts (adaptation), Henry James (book)
- Original air date: January 8, 1959
- Running time: 1:27:43

Guest appearances
- Dana Wynter as Kate Croy; James Donald as Miles Enshaw; Isabel Jeans as Aunt Maude

Episode chronology
← Previous "Face of a Hero"	Next → "The Blue Men"

"The Wings of the Dove" was an American television play broadcast on January 8, 1959 as part of the CBS television series, Playhouse 90. The cast included Dana Wynter, James Donald, and Isabel Jeans. Robert Stevens was the director. The teleplay was written by Meade Roberts as an adaptation of the novel, The Wings of the Dove, by Henry James.

== Plot ==
In the early 20th century, Kate Croy moves into the London home of her wealthy aunt. The aunt forbids Croy from seeing the writer whom she loves.

== Cast ==
The cast includes the following.

- Dana Wynter as Kate Croy
- James Donald as Miles Enshaw
- Isabel Jeans as Aunt Maude
- Inga Swenson as Milly Theale
- John Baragrey as Lord Mark
- Henry Daniell as Lionel Croy
- Lurene Tuttle as Susan Stringham
- Alan Napier as Sir Luke
- Mavis Neal as Lady Mills
- Sally Cooper as Marian Condrip
- Bryan Grant as The Young Gentleman
- Doris Lloyd as The Elderly Woman
- Sheila Keddy as The Nurse
- Clive L. Halliday as The Old Man
- Grazia Narciso as The Bewigged Lady
- Albert Carrier as The Escort
- Herbert Deans as The Butler
- A.G. Vitanza as The Servant
- Dino Bolognese as The Artist

== Production ==
The program aired on January 8, 1959, on the CBS television series Playhouse 90. Robert Stevens was the director. The teleplay was written by Meade Roberts as an adaptation of the novel by Henry James.
