= Gusenburg =

- Municipality
- Coat of arms

- Location of Gusenburg within Trier-Saarburg district
- Interactive map of Gusenburg
- Location within Germany Location within Rhineland-Palatinate
- Coordinates: 49°38′7.69″N 6°54′3.31″E
- Country: Germany
- State: Rhineland-Palatinate
- District: Trier-Saarburg
- Municipal assoc.: Hermeskeil

Government
  - Mayor (2019–24): Siegfried Joram (CDU)

Area
  - Total: 7.36 km^{2} (2.84 sq mi)
- Elevation: 500 m (1,600 ft)

Population (2025-12-31)
  - Total: 1,104
  - Density: 150/km^{2} (388/sq mi)
- Time zone: UTC+01:00 (CET)
  - Summer (DST): UTC+02:00 (CEST)
- Postal codes: 54413
- Dialling codes: 06503
- Vehicle registration: TR
- Website: www.gusenburg.de

Gusenburg is a municipality in the Trier-Saarburg district, in Rhineland-Palatinate, Germany.
