= Mid-North District =

Historic district in Chicago

Coordinates: 41°55′20″N 87°38′29″W

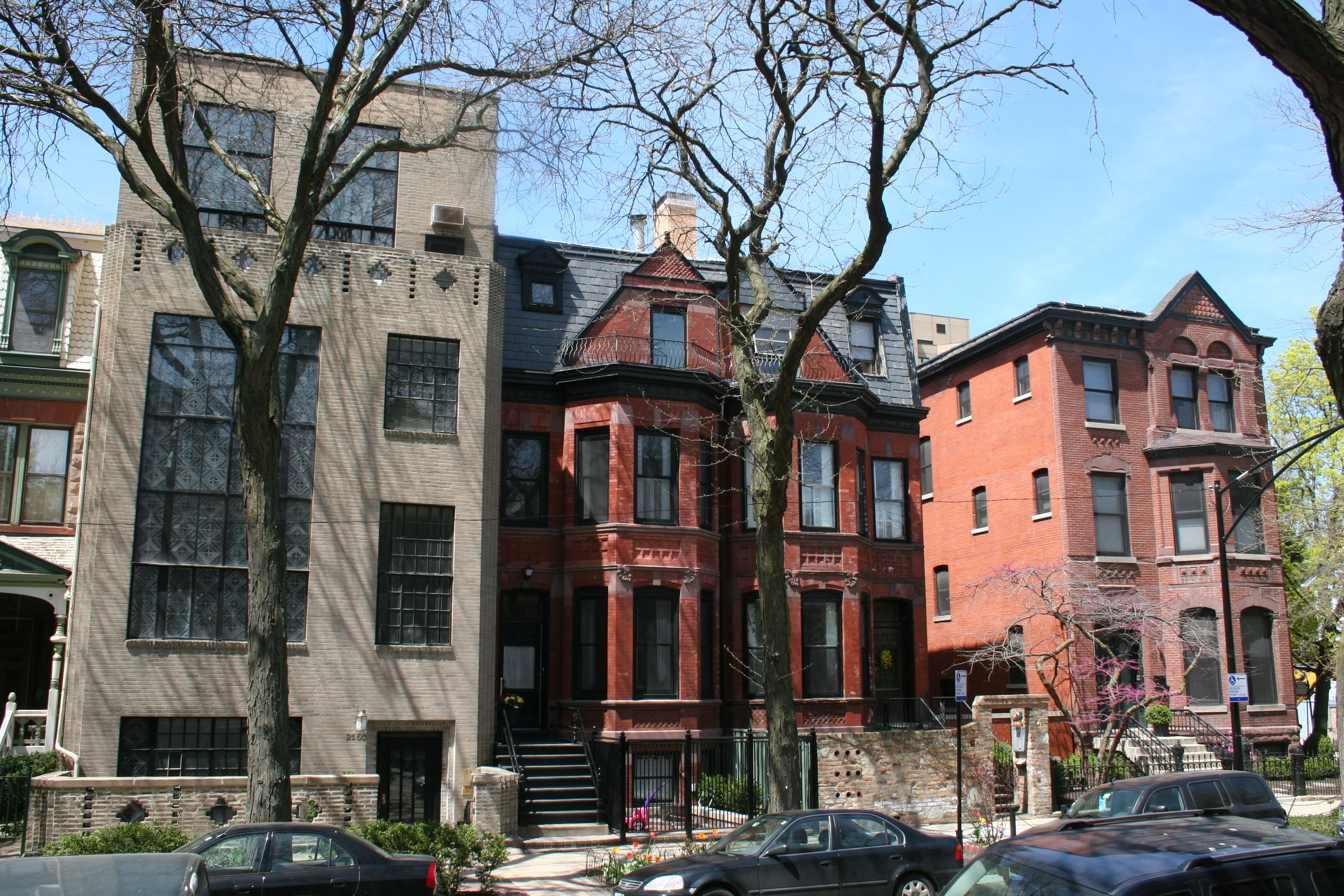
Buildings on Cleveland Avenue in the Mid-North District

The Mid-North District or Midtown-North is a historic district in the Lincoln Park community area of Chicago, Illinois. The district was built from 1865 to 1900 by various architects. It is bounded by Fullerton Avenue to the north, Armitage Avenue to the south, Lincoln Avenue to the west and Clark Street to the east. It was designated a Chicago Landmark on August 31, 1977.
