= Joe Aiello =

Italian-American bootlegger (1890–1930)

Giuseppe Aiello
- Joe Aiello
- Born: September 27, 1890; Bagheria, Sicily, Kingdom of Italy
- Died: October 23, 1930 (aged 40); Chicago, Illinois, U.S.
- Cause of death: Multiple gunshots
- Resting place: Riverside Cemetery, Rochester, New York, U.S.

Giuseppe "Joe" Aiello (Italian pronunciation: [dʒuˈzɛppe aˈjɛllo]; September 27, 1890 – October 23, 1930) was a Sicilian bootlegger and organized crime leader in Chicago during the Prohibition era. He was best known for his long and bloody feud with Chicago Outfit boss Al Capone.

Aiello masterminded several unsuccessful attempts to assassinate Capone, and fought against his former business partner Antonio Lombardo, a Capone ally, for control of the Chicago branch of the Unione Siciliana benevolent society. Aiello and his ally Bugs Moran are believed to have arranged the murder of Lombardo, which directly led Capone to organize the St. Valentine's Day Massacre in retaliation.

Despite being forced to flee Chicago multiple times throughout the gang war, Aiello eventually took control of the Unione Siciliana in 1929, and ranked seventh among the Chicago Crime Commission's list of top "public enemies". Aiello was killed after Capone gunmen ambushed him as he exited a Chicago apartment building where he had been hiding out, shooting him 59 times. After his death, the Chicago Tribune described Aiello as "the toughest gangster in Chicago, and one of the toughest in the country".

== Early life ==
Aiello was born on September 27, 1890, in Bagheria, Sicily, to father Carlo Sr. Aiello was part of a large and impoverished family of at least nine other brothers and many cousins. His mother died when he was a child. In July 1907, at the age of 17, Aiello immigrated to the United States to join family members already residing there. After arriving in New York City by boat, he worked a series of menial jobs in Buffalo and Utica, New York, before connecting with his father, brothers and cousins in Chicago. The family set up several businesses in both New York and Chicago, including the financially successful Aiello Brothers Bakery, and they become importers of such groceries as olive oil, cheeses and sugar.

Aiello was the co-owner of a cheese importing business with a fellow Sicilian, Antonio "Tony the Scourge" Lombardo, an ally of organized crime figure Al Capone. Aiello was president of the company, which was called Antonio Lombardo & Co., and Capone was said to have lent both men $100,000 to start the enterprise. With the enactment of Prohibition and the start of bootlegging, the sugar import business brought Aiello into contact with organized crime, along with his brothers Dominick, Antonio, Andrew and Carlo. In Chicago they made a small fortune selling sugar and other home-cooked alcohol components to the Genna crime family, and Aiello earned enough money to buy a three-story mansion in Rogers Park. However, he craved recognition and prestige in addition to money, something he was gaining as he was becoming known as the top organized crime boss of Chicago. When the Genna family lost power in Chicago following gang wars, the Aiellos believed themselves the successors of their territory.

== Feud begins with Al Capone ==
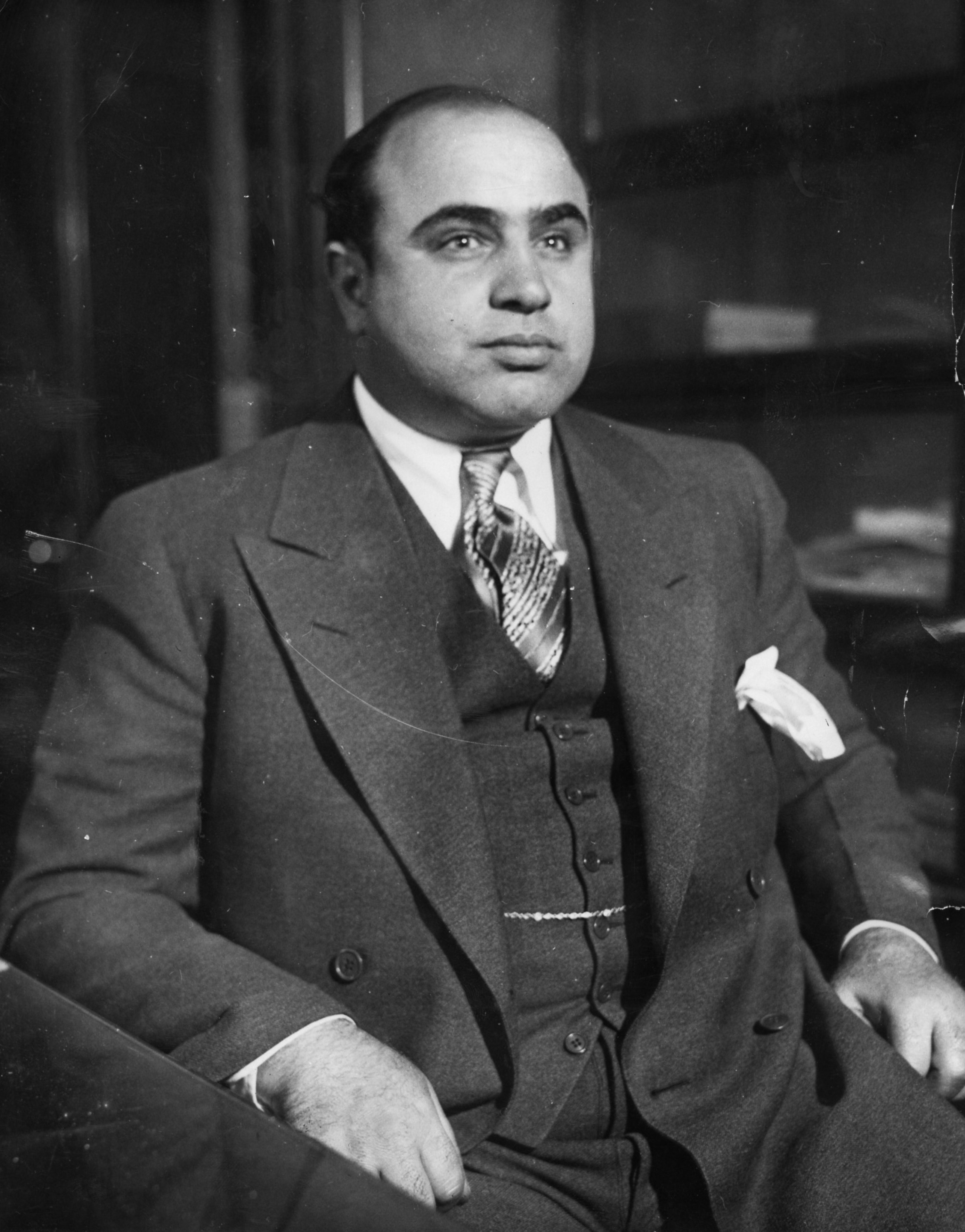
Joe Aiello made several unsuccessful attempts to assassinate his rival, Al Capone (pictured).

In November 1925 Lombardo was named head of the Unione Siciliana, a Sicilian-American benevolent society that had been corrupted by gangsters. An infuriated Aiello, who had wanted the position himself, believed Capone was responsible for Lombardo's ascension and he resented the non-Sicilian's attempts to manipulate affairs within the Unione. Aiello severed all personal and business ties with Lombardo and entered into a feud with him and Capone, essentially ending a Chicago gang peace treaty that had been in force since the 1926 murder of Capone rival Hymie Weiss. Aiello allied himself with several other Capone enemies, including Dean O'Banion, and the trio of Billy Skidmore, Barney Bertsche and Jack Zuta, who ran vice and gambling houses together, although they became less receptive to Aiello after Capone personally approached and threatened Skidmore. While newspapers falsely reported that Aiello had also entered into an active alliance with George "Bugs" Moran and his North Side Gang at this time, Moran in fact pledged no specific support to Aiello until later, and instead privately supported Aiello from the sidelines without actively participating.

Aiello plotted to eliminate both Lombardo and Capone, and starting in the spring of 1927 made several attempts to assassinate Capone. On one occasion he offered money to the chef of Joseph "Diamond Joe" Esposito's Bella Napoli Café, Capone's favorite restaurant, to put prussic acid in Capone's and Lombardo's soup; reports indicated he offered between $10,000 and $35,000. Instead, the chef exposed the plot to Capone, who responded by dispatching men to destroy one of Aiello's stores on West Division Street with machine-gun fire. More than 200 bullets were fired into the Aiello Brothers Bakery on May 28, 1927, wounding Joe's brother Antonio. During the summer and autumn of 1927 a number of hitmen Aiello hired to kill Capone were themselves slain. Among them were Anthony Russo and Vincent Spicuzza, each of whom had been offered $25,000 by Aiello to kill Capone and Lombardo. Aiello eventually offered a $50,000 reward to anyone who eliminated Capone. At least 10 gunmen tried to collect on Aiello's bounty, but ended up dead. Capone ally Ralph Sheldon attempted to kill both Capone and Lombardo for Aiello's reward, but Capone henchman Frank Nitti's intelligence network learned of the transaction and had Sheldon shot in front of a West Side hotel, although he didn't die.

== Gang war with Capone escalates ==
In November 1927 Aiello organized machine-gun ambushes across from Lombardo's home and a cigar store frequented by Capone, but those plans were foiled after an anonymous tip led police to raid several addresses and arrest Milwaukee gunman Angelo La Mantio and four other Aiello gunmen. After the police discovered receipts for the apartments in La Mantio's pockets, he confessed that Aiello had hired him to kill Capone and Lombardo, leading the police to arrest Aiello himself and bring him to the South Clark Street police station. Upon learning of the arrest, Capone dispatched nearly two dozen gunmen to stand guard outside the station and await Aiello's release. The men made no attempt to conceal their purpose there, and reporters and photographers rushed to the scene to observe Aiello's expected murder. Capone gunmen Frank Perry, Sam Marcus and Louis "Little New York" Campagna were arrested as they tried to enter the front of the station and placed in the cell next to Aiello, who Campagna told, "You're dead, friend, dead. You won't get up to the end of the street still walking". Aiello pleaded for mercy and promised to sell his possessions and leave Chicago with his family if they let him go, but Campagna refused the request. When released, Aiello was given a police escort out of the station to safety. He later failed to make a court appearance after his attorney claimed he suffered a nervous breakdown. Aiello disappeared with some family members to Trenton, New Jersey, from whence he continued his campaign against Capone and Lombardo.

Aiello's brother Dominick returned to Chicago in January 1928 to attend to family matters while his brother remained in New Jersey. One day he received a telephone call warning him to leave town, after which the Aiello Brothers Bakery was shot up by gunmen. Aiello briefly allied himself with former Capone employer and friend Frankie Yale, meeting with him regularly in New York City and plotting Capone's overthrow, until Yale himself was murdered. Aiello was said to have fled to Wisconsin under the protection of the Milwaukee crime family, and also briefly took refuge in Buffalo with his ally there, crime family boss Stefano Magaddino. With Aiello still in hiding, Capone started targeting Aiello's men and killed several over the next few years, including his brother Dominick. Aiello returned to Chicago in the summer of 1928 and once again approached Moran, whose relationship with Capone had degenerated even further, making him much more receptive to an active alliance with Aiello. They conspired to eliminate Lombardo, a task they assigned to hitmen Frank "Tight Lips" and Peter Gusenberg. Lombardo was shot to death on a busy Chicago street on September 7, 1928, and although never arrested, at least one of the Gusenberg brothers is believed to have been among the shooters. After Lombardo's death, Aiello attempted to elevate his ally Peter Rizzito to the Unione Siciliana position, but Rizzito was killed by shotgun blasts outside his home.

== Rise to Unione Siciliana leader ==
Aiello was also believed to have masterminded the murder of Pasqualino "Patsy" Lolordo, Lombardo's successor as head of the Unione, who was killed in his home on January 8, 1929. Police alleged that Aiello suggested a truce with Lolordo, and when Lolordo invited Aiello into his home for a toast of friendship, Aiello and two others shot him to death. When police later questioned Lolordo's widow, she screamed when she was shown a photo of Aiello, but refused to explain why she was afraid and would not answer questions about him. Capone retaliated against Moran by organizing the St. Valentine's Day Massacre, a hit that wiped out the Gusenberg brothers, decimated Moran's forces and resulted in the loss of a significant amount of Aiello's support. Shortly afterwards Aiello persuaded Capone killers Albert Anselmi and John Scalise to betray their employer and convinced Joseph "Hop Toad" Giunta, the new head of the Unione Siciliana, to support Aiello in eliminating Capone and taking control of the North Side of Chicago following the departure of Bugs Moran. However, Capone learned of Aiello's plot in April 1929, and killed all three men.

The violent retaliation against Aiello indirectly led him to finally become head of the Unione. During a conference in Atlantic City, numerous mob bosses supported Aiello's promotion with the hopes of restoring order in Chicago, and Capone apparently accepted the decision, at least temporarily. Retired Chicago mob boss Johnny Torrio was said to have mediated a peace agreement among Capone, Aiello and Moran, in which they agreed to end the gang warfare and murders. However, Aiello's accession coincided with Capone serving a year in prison for carrying a concealed weapon, which Aiello saw as an opportunity to take control of some of Capone's territory and scheme yet again for his assassination. Aiello gained a measure of nationwide notoriety around this time, after ranking seventh on Chicago Crime Commission Chairman Frank J. Loesch's "public enemies" list, released in April 1930, which identified the top 28 people he saw as corrupting Chicago.

Through his Mafia boss allies Magaddino and Gaspar Milazzo, Aiello arranged a meeting with Joe Masseria, the capo di tutti capi based in New York City, seeking support in Aiello's efforts against Capone. During the meeting Masseria offered to support Aiello in exchange for control of the east side of Chicago, which would allow Aiello to keep the city's west side. The offer infuriated Aiello, who threatened Masseria and ordered him to leave the city. In turn, Masseria spread false rumors that Aiello attempted to kill Masseria, giving him a pretext to support Capone in retaliation. Mafioso Joseph Bonanno later described this as a key incident in starting the Castellammarese War in New York City. Masseria openly supported Capone, requiring a strong alliance with him following the death of Masseria ally Giuseppe Morello. He also offered territory to Milazzo if he betrayed Aiello, an offer Milazzo rebuffed and considered insulting. As a result, Aiello backed Salvatore Maranzano in the Castellammarese War, providing the Maranzano forces with $5,000 a week for their war chest.

During the early months of 1930 Aiello arranged several unsuccessful assassination attempts against Capone bodyguards, including Jack McGurn, Phil D'Andrea and Rocco De Grazia. Aiello hoped to leave Capone vulnerable by depleting his security, and Capone began to suspect Aiello had spies within the Chicago Outfit because he seemed to have inside knowledge about where his targets would be and when. In August 1930, two months before Aiello's death, the state's attorney conducted a raid on Aiello's home, obtaining records as part of a series of raids by the United States government to fight against gangland activities in Chicago.

== Death ==
In 1930, upon learning of Aiello's continued plotting against him, Capone resolved to finally eliminate him. In the weeks before Aiello's death Capone's men tracked him to Rochester, New York, where he had connections through Magaddino, and plotted to kill him there, but Aiello returned to Chicago before the plot could be executed. Aiello, angst-ridden from the constant need to hide out and the killings of several of his men, set up residence in the Chicago apartment of Unione Siciliana treasurer Pasquale "Patsy Presto" Prestigiacomo at 205 N. Kolmar Ave. He moved in on October 13, 1930, and rarely left the apartment. However, his wife and child occasionally visited him, and Frank Nitti biographer Mars Eghigian Jr. theorized that Capone's forces located Aiello by tracking his family members. Men who gave the names Morris Friend and Henry Jacobson rented rooms in an apartment across the street overlooking Prestigiacomo's apartment building and began observing Aiello. On October 23, Aiello made plans to permanently leave Chicago and apparently move to Mexico, although Prestigiacomo later told police Aiello was simply leaving the house for a barber's appointment. Upon exiting Prestigiacomo's building to enter a taxicab, a gunman in a second-floor window across the street started firing at Aiello with a submachine gun. Aiello was said to have been shot at least 13 times before he toppled off the building steps and moved around the corner, attempting to move out of the line of fire. Instead, he moved directly into the range of a second submachine gun positioned on the third floor of another apartment block, and was subsequently gunned down.

After the ambush the two apparent shooters ran from the buildings and fled in a Ford sedan; the car was later discovered to have been set on fire and destroyed. Aiello's body was loaded into the taxicab and taken to Garfield Park Hospital, where he was pronounced dead. The coroner eventually removed 59 bullets, weighing over a pound, from the body. He was shot more times than any single victim of the St. Valentine's Day Massacre. A third machine gun position, which was ultimately not used, was later discovered by police in another nearby building, which had been rented a week before the murder by a man who gave the name Lon Celespe. Police, prosecutors and federal agents immediately and publicly speculated that Capone was behind the assassination, noting that the precision machine-gun ambush was typical of his attacks. However, at least one press story at the time speculated Moran could have been behind the hit. Prestigiacomo, fearful for his life, went into hiding for three days after Aiello's death before turning himself in to police. He was charged as an accessory before the fact of Aiello's murder, a charge also filed against John Sorce, an employee of Aiello's importing company. Detectives questioned whether Prestigiacomo provided Aiello's enemies with information about his whereabouts, something he vehemently denied. Police claimed Prestigiacomo was not cooperative and lied about his relationship with Aiello. The charges against Prestigiacomo went to a grand jury but were ultimately dropped. Frank Nitti was also wanted by police for questioning in connection with the murder.

Some historians later suggested Mafia forces outside Chicago may have been behind the hit as part of the Castellammarese War, but Virgil Peterson, an expert on Chicago organized crime, believed the murder was strictly related to city gang warfare. Aiello's family ordered an $11,000 coffin for him. Before eventually being placed in Riverside Cemetery in Rochester, New York, Aiello was originally buried in Mount Carmel Cemetery in Chicago on October 29, 1930, close to former friend-turned-rival Lombardo. Capone continued to hunt down Aiello's allies even after his death. One month after Aiello was killed, police discovered an abandoned machine gun nest, manned by alleged Capone gangsters, in a house opposite the home of four of Aiello's former henchmen. Aiello's nephew, Frank Aiello Jr., was fatally shot through a window while he was playing cards in his Milwaukee home on May 23, 1931. Authorities believed the killing was related to the Chicago feud, despite Frank's apparent lack of ties to organized crime. Aiello's death left Capone effectively unchallenged in his control over Chicago, and brought 70 years of peace to the city in terms of the Chicago Outfit leadership. Aiello was believed to have been responsible for the deaths of at least 24 people throughout his life, according to the Chicago Tribune, which described him as "the toughest gangster in Chicago, and one of the toughest in the country".

== See also ==
- List of homicides in Illinois § Organized crime

Preceded by Joseph Giunta (1929)	Unione Siciliane Boss; 1929–1930	Succeeded by Salvatore Loverde (1930–1931)
