= Antonio Lombardo (gangster) =

Italian-American mobster (1891–1928)

Antonio "Tony the Scourge" Lombardo (Italian pronunciation: [anˈtɔːnjo lomˈbardo]; November 23, 1891 – September 7, 1928) was an Italian-born American mobster. He was consigliere to Al Capone, and later the President of the Unione Siciliana.

== Biography ==
Born in the town of Galati Mamertino in Sicily on November 23, 1891, Antonio Lombardo immigrated to the United States in the early 20th century where he became a successful wholesale grocery business owner in Chicago, Illinois. In September 1917 he was involved in the killing of Cleveland Police Officer Elmer Glaefke A long time Mafia associate, Lombardo became Al Capone's advisor after John Torrio retired in 1925.

Lombardo tried unsuccessfully to negotiate peace between the Chicago Outfit and the North Side Gang during the four-year gang war, suggesting that Capone surrender supposed Dean O'Banion assassins Albert Anselmi and John Scalise, which Capone refused. Lombardo, with the help of Capone, later became President of the Unione Siciliana in November 1925, attempting to regain control of the unstable organization as well as instituting reforms, including opening membership to non-Sicilian Italian immigrants (such as the Neapolitan Capone) and changing the organization's name to the Italo-American National Union.

Lombardo's reforms, however, caused some resentment within Unione Siciliana members. With the partnership of Al Capone and New York gangster Frankie Yale worsening, possibly due to the end of payoffs from the Unione Siciliana to Yale, Lombardo was challenged for the Presidency by Joe Aiello, supported by Yale, in January 1928.

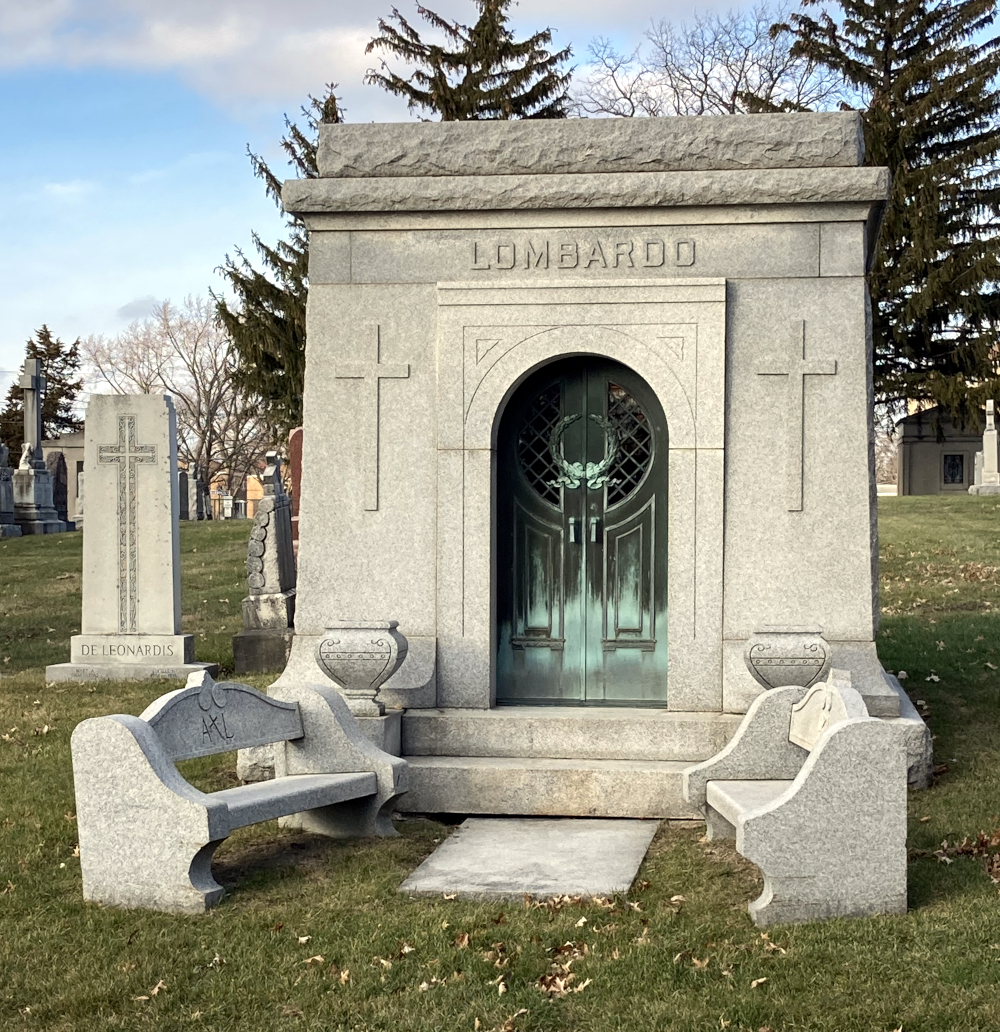
Lombardo mausoleum at Mount Carmel Cemetery

Lombardo, however, refused to resign and continued to organize civic projects under the Unione Siciliana until shortly before his death on September 7, 1928. Lombardo was gunned down, along with his bodyguard Joseph Ferrara (although bodyguard Joe Lolordo survived), allegedly by an alliance of the Joe Aiello Gang and the North Side Gang, at the intersections of Madison Street and Dearborn Street. It was said that Moran ordered this death and had his two experienced gunman do the job with the help of Aiello. Thought to be retaliation for the murder of Frankie Yale the previous July, Lombardo's death was in turn soon avenged with the murder of members of the Joe Aiello Gang and the St. Valentine's Day Massacre, in 1929. He is buried in Mount Carmel Cemetery in Hillside, Illinois.

Only one gunman was identified in Lombardo's death: a Frank Marco aka Marlo who was killed in New York City February 17, 1931 {See}; a possible unknown accomplice to Marco was killed September 9, 1928, in Michigan. Another suspect was Pietro La Mantia It is also alleged Peter Gusenberg also helped carry out the murders on Antonio Lombardo and Pasquale Lolorado with his younger brother Frank Gusenberg and Albert Kachellek, a fellow cellmate at Joliet.

== See also ==
- List of homicides in Illinois § Organized crime

Preceded by Samuzzo Amatuna (1925)	Chicago Mafia Boss; 1925-1928	Succeeded by Pasqualino Lolordo (1928-1929)
