= Jack McGurn =

American mobster

- Born: Vincenzo Antonio Gibaldi; 2 July 1902; Licata, Sicily, Italy
- Died: 15 February 1936 (aged 33); Chicago, Illinois, U.S.
- Cause of death: Gunshot wounds
- Resting place: Mount Carmel Cemetery, Hillside, Illinois, U.S.
- Other names: Machine Gun Jack McGurn; Vincent Gebardi; Battling Jack McGurn
- Citizenship: American
- Occupations: Boxer; Gangster
- Years active: 1923–1933
- Spouse: Louise Rolfe (m. 1931)
- Allegiance: Chicago Outfit

Jack "Machine Gun Jack" McGurn (born Vincenzo Antonio Gibaldi; Italian: [vinˈtʃɛntso anˈtɔːnjo dʒiˈbaldi]; July 2, 1902 – February 15, 1936) was a Sicilian-American boxer, mobster, and eventually a made man and caporegime in Al Capone's Chicago Outfit.

== Early life ==
McGurn was born in July 1902 in Licata, Sicily, the eldest son of Tommaso and Giuseppina (née Verderame) Gibaldi. Four years later, he and his mother emigrated to join his father in the United States of America, arriving at Ellis Island on November 24, 1906. McGurn grew up in Red Hook, Brooklyn where he went to Public School 46 on Union Street.

McGurn moved to Chicago when he was 14 where he later took up a career in boxing as a teenager and changed his name to "Battling" Jack McGurn because boxers with Irish names got the better bookings. They lived near Taylor street in Chicago's Little Italy neighborhood. After Tommaso's death while McGurn was still young, his mother remarried to grocer Angelo DeMory.

== Prohibition ==
The Genna gang, which ruled Chicago's Little Italy at the time, demanded money from the area's inhabitants and businesses to help pay for the gang's legal defense. McGurn's stepfather, Angelo DeMory, either refused or could not pay and was murdered by Genna gangsters in 1923. A few years later, in February 1926, McGurn avenged his death by hunting down and killing the three men responsible over the course of eight days. After this rampage, McGurn spent a short time with the North Side Gang before ending up in the Capone gang by April 1926.

McGurn quickly became one of the Capone gang's most prolific, and successful, hitmen. He was with Capone on April 27, 1926, when they gunned down Westside O'Donnell gangsters James J. Doherty and Thomas "Red" Duffy. Assistant State's Attorney William H. McSwiggin, whom the gunmen were unaware was riding in the car with the gangsters, was also killed in this attack. Slugs recovered from the crime scene were later matched to a Tommy Gun used by McGurn.

One of McGurn’s most high-profile hits was the assassination of North Side Gang leader Earl “Hymie” Weiss on October 11, 1926. McGurn is reputed to have used his trademark Tommy Gun as he gunned down the gang leader from an open window across the street from Holy Name Cathedral.

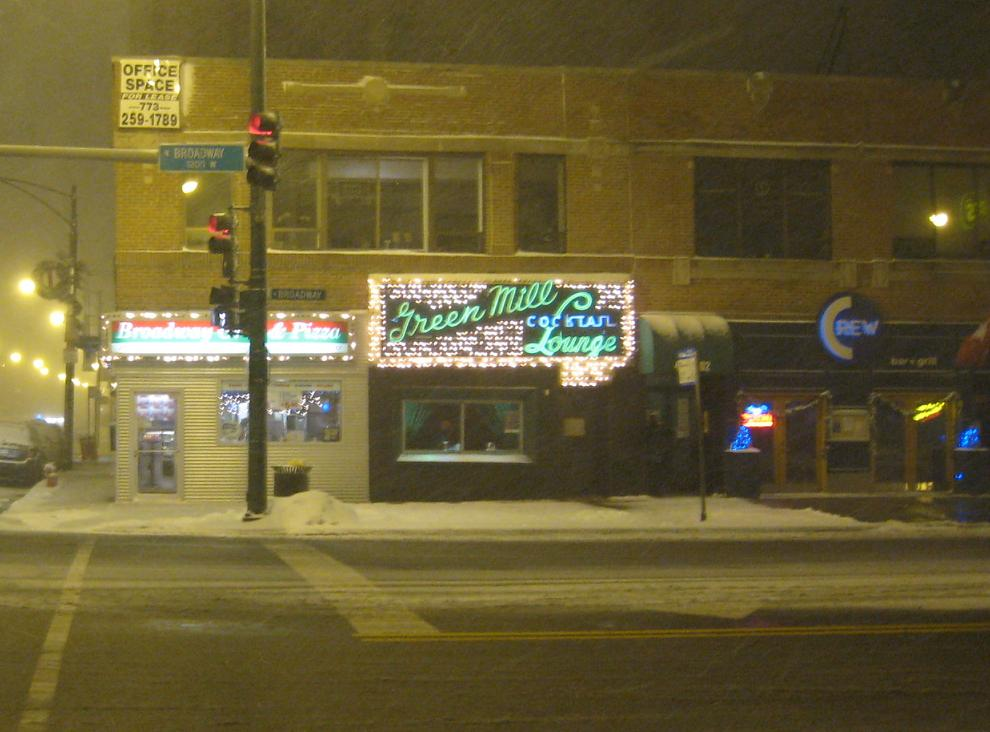
Green Mill, 4802 N. Broadway

In the summer of 1927, Joe Aiello made an attempt to take over the Unione Siciliana. He put $25,000 bounties on Al Capone and Tony Lombardo, which attracted assassins from out of town. Between May and September 1927, Jack McGurn killed at least four would-be hitmen that had come to Chicago to kill his boss. On March 7, 1928, McGurn was shot and wounded by the Gusenberg brothers at the Hotel McCormick, at Ontario and Rush street, from where he had been leading a local takeover of the beer racket. On April 17, McGurn was shot at by North siders James Clark and Billy Davern, at the corner of Morgan and Harrison. McGurn retaliated by killing Billy Davern a few weeks later.

McGurn had part ownership of a speakeasy jazz club, a venue which still exists today, the infamous Green Mill, at 4802 North Broadway, in the middle of the rival "Bugs" Moran gang's territory. In November 1927, manager Danny Cohen gave McGurn the task of "persuading" comedian/singer Joe E. Lewis not to move his act south to the New Rendezvous Café, at North Clark Street and West Diversey Parkway. Lewis refused, and McGurn slit Lewis's throat, cutting off a portion of his tongue and leaving him for dead. Miraculously, Lewis eventually recovered and resumed his career, but his voice never regained its lush sound. Lewis switched from being primarily a singer to being a comedian.

== St. Valentine's Day Massacre ==
Some have suggested McGurn was involved in planning the St. Valentine's Day Massacre, in 1929, though this has not been proven.

Although police charged McGurn in the case, he was never brought to trial largely due to his "blonde alibi" — girlfriend and later wife Louise Rolfe — who claimed they spent the whole day together.

== Later years ==
In April 1930, when Frank J. Loesch, chairman of the Chicago Crime Commission compiled his "Public Enemies" list of the top 28 people he saw as corrupting Chicago, McGurn's name was fourth on the list, which was published nationwide.

This notoriety caused him to be shunned by the Outfit. McGurn, who had great hand-eye coordination, subsequently attempted a career as a professional golfer. McGurn was a silent partner in Evergreen Golf Course, at 91st Street and Western Avenue, a known mob hangout where he could often be found playing, practicing, giving lessons, or drinking and playing cards in the clubhouse. Dan Lilly was known to have caddied for him once and claimed that he kept a machine gun in his golf bag at all times. FBI documents released in December 1999 revealed that singer Bing Crosby, who frequently played golf in Chicago, was one of McGurn's golfing partners.

On August 25, 1933, the Western Open golf championship began at Olympia Fields Country Club in the far south suburb of Olympia Fields. A reasonably skilled golfer and flashy dresser, McGurn entered the competition as Vincent Gebhardi (another version of his real name), the professional at public Evergreen Golf Course. In the opening round, McGurn carded a 13-over-par 83 on course No. 4 (today's North Course). The next morning, the name "Gebhardi" on the day's pairing sheet was observed by an alert Chicago Police chief detective, who sent two sergeants to arrest him. "Aware of McGurn's truculent temper", the Chicago Tribune account reported, "the sergeants enlisted the help of Lt. Frank McGillen and five policemen from the Homewood station of the county highway force".

McGurn was playing much better the second day. The group of burly officers accosted McGurn on the seventh green and told him he was under arrest under a warrant issued the day before under the "criminal reputation law". He was accompanied by his wife, the glitzy "Blonde Alibi" Louise Rolfe. Wearing a tight, thin white dress and sporting a three-carat diamond ring, she approached the policemen and snapped, "Whose brilliant idea was this?" McGurn politely asked to finish his round. Amused, the plainclothesmen agreed and became part of his gallery. But the police presence began to unnerve McGurn and his game suddenly went sour. He came in with a 16-over-par 86 for a 36-hole total of 169, 14 strokes above making the cut.

== Death ==
Less than three years later, McGurn, by then impoverished and cast out of the Outfit, was assassinated by three men with pistols on February 15, 1936, one day after the seventh anniversary of the St. Valentine's Day massacre. He was bowling at the second-floor Avenue Recreation Bowling Alley, at 805 N. Milwaukee Avenue in Chicago.

McGurn's assassins tossed a Valentine card with a prophetic poem near to his body:

"You've lost your job, you've lost your dough,
Your jewels and cars and handsome houses,
But things could still be worse you know...
At least you haven't lost your trousers!".

He was laid to rest at Mount Carmel Cemetery in Hillside, Illinois.

After McGurn's murder, his half-brother, Anthony De Mory, angrily said, "I know the guys who killed Jack. I'm going to get them". On March 2, 1936, however, De Mory was fatally shot by three masked men inside a Chicago pool hall. The Chicago Police Department linked the assassination to McGurn's slaying.

The identity of McGurn's killers remains unknown, but research and speculation by criminologists suggest three possible theories:

1. Revenge by former Irish mob boss George "Bugs" Moran, who McGurn had tried to kill almost seven years before.
2. A contract killing ordered by the Chicago Outfit under Frank Nitti, because McGurn (an alcoholic and a braggart), had become a liability due to his extensive inside knowledge of the American Mafia.
3. Revenge by James Gusenberg, the brother of Frank and Peter Gusenberg, who were both murdered during the St. Valentine's Day Massacre.

== See also ==
- List of homicides in Illinois § Organized crime

== Bibliography ==
- Parr, Amanda J. (2005). The True and Complete Story of Machine Gun Jack McGurn. Matador. ISBN 1-905237-13-8.
- Gusfield, Jeffrey (2012). Deadly Valentines: The Story of Capone's Henchman "Machine Gun" Jack McGurn and Louise Rolfe, His Blonde Alibi. Chicago Review Press. ISBN 978-1613740927.
