= Pasqualino Lolordo =

Italian-American mobster

Pasquale Lolordo (1887 – January 8, 1929), also known as Pasqualino or "Patsy", was an Italian-born American Mafia boss from Ribera, Sicily, and head of the Chicago chapter of the Unione Siciliana, a "front" organization for the Mafia. Lolordo was considered one of the most powerful Mafia bosses during the late 1920s.

Lolordo succeeded Antonio "The Scourge" Lombardo, an associate of Al Capone, as chapter president. Lombardo had been killed only months before after he refused to turn the presidency over to Mafia mobster Joe Aiello. Lolordo was supported by the national Unione Siciliana president, Frankie Yale, in New York. Some speculate that Lolordo wanted to reform the organization like another former chapter leader, Mike Merlo.

Lolordo did not have sufficient time to do anything. On January 8, 1929, he was shot and killed by unidentified gunmen in his home. The killing was arranged by George "Bugs" Moran, a leader of the North Side Gang and a bitter rival of Capone, as a preface to a planned assassination of Capone. Moran, working in concert with Joe Aiello, was convinced that such a move would remove the bulk of Capone's Mafia protection.

== See also ==
- List of homicides in Illinois § Organized crime

== Notes ==
Preceded by Antonio Lombardo (1925-1928)	Chicago Mafia Boss; 1928-1929	Succeeded by Joseph Giunta (1929)
