= Alphonse W. Salomone Jr. =

Canadian-American hotelier (1919-1993)

- Alphonse W. Salomone Jr.
- Born: 1919; Winnipeg, Manitoba, Canada
- Died: March 16, 1993 (aged 73); Huntington, New York, U.S.
- Other name: Alphonse Salamone
- Occupation: Hotelier
- Known for: Being the manager of the Plaza Hotel; As a character in Kay Thompson's Eloise series of children's books

Alphonse W. Salomone Jr. (sometimes misspelled Salamone; 1919—March 16, 1993) was a Canadian-American hotelier of Italian descent, referred to by Ward Morehouse III as "one of the country's most respected hotelmen". He is best known for being the Vice President of the Hilton Hotel Corporation's Eastern properties and the manager of the prestigious Washington and New York Hiltons, and New York's Plaza Hotel, Ritz-Carlton, and the Waldorf Astoria New York.

== Early life and background ==
Born in Winnipeg, Manitoba, Canada, Salomone was raised in Knoxville, Tennessee. In Knoxville he began working for the Andrew Johnson Hotel in Knoxville as a young man in the 1930s. In World War II he was promoted to a major, earning a Bronze Star for fighting in five battles in Europe.

== Career ==
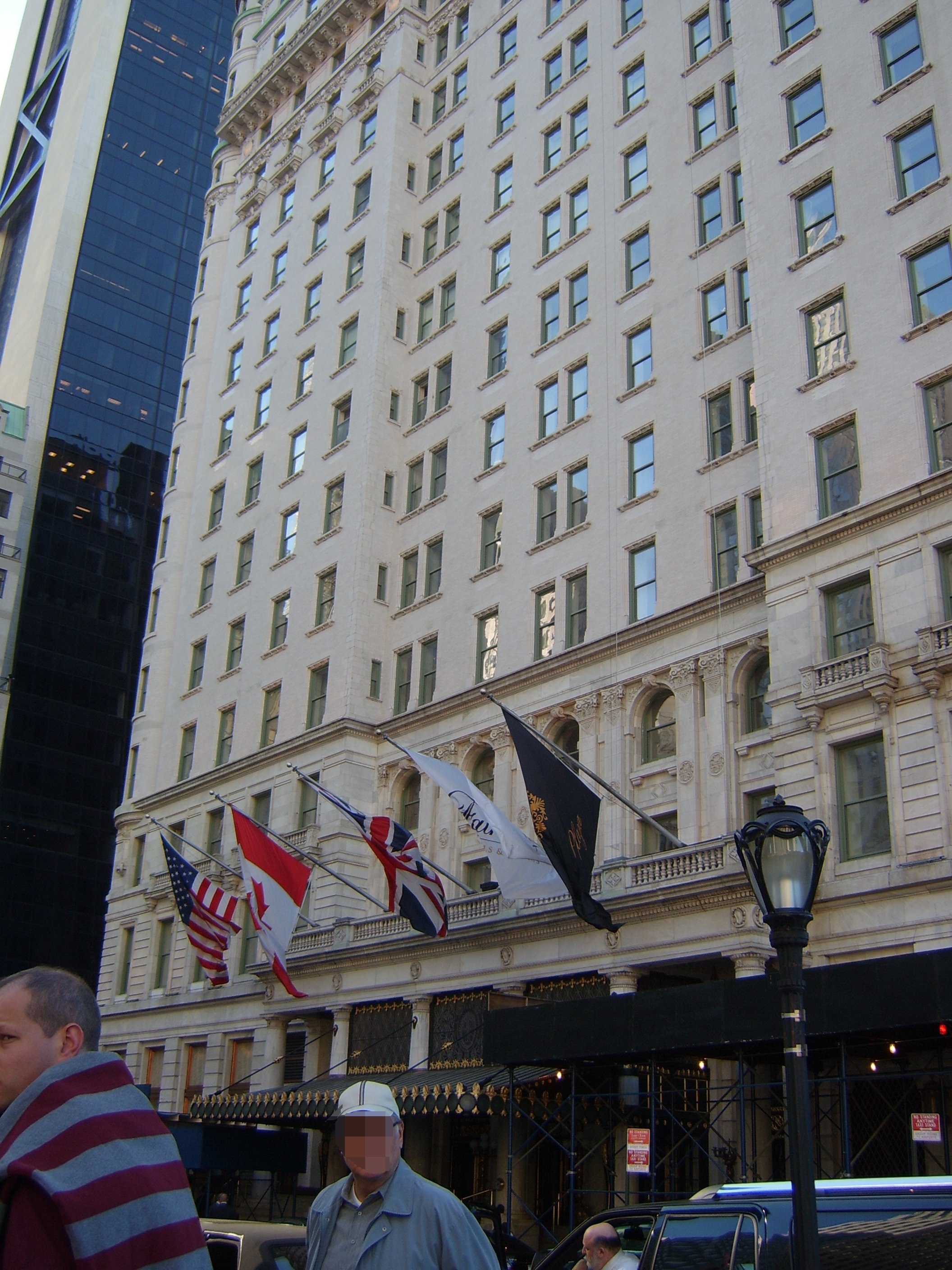
The Plaza Hotel in 2008

In 1947, Salomone began working for the Plaza Hotel of New York and later became its manager, before accepting a position as vice president of the Caribe Hilton in San Juan. In the 1960s he returned to the Plaza Hotel at a time of financial hardship, before becoming the president of the New York's Realty Hotels: the Barclay, Biltmore, Roosevelt and Commodore, later in the decade. By the 1980s, he was the managing director of New York's Hilton Hotel.

He also held various important positions in the hotel industry including chairman of the National Hotel and Motel Exposition, president of the Hotel Association of New York City, chairman of New York's Council of Midtown Associations, vice chairman of the New York Convention and Visitors Bureau, and others. Salomone was also the chairman, president and chief executive officer of John B. Coleman Company, New York; Coleman had been the owner of the New York Ritz-Carlton and the Washington Ritz-Carlton. In 1982, he was honored with the Gold Key Award by the Avenue of the Americas Association.

As the manager of the Plaza, Salomone was written into the Eloise series of books written by Kay Thompson, who was a long-time resident of the hotel. Salomone first appeared in print in Eloise: A Book for Precocious Grown-ups, published in 1955. When this book was made into a made-for television film for Walt Disney Television in 2003, Jeffrey Tambor played the role of Salomone. Tim Curry later lent his voice as Salomone in the 2006 animated series. Salomone, who was also a friend of Thompson, was quick to realize that publicity for the series of Eloise books also meant publicity for the Plaza. He was always ready to assist Thompson and her publisher in their ventures. Thompson wrote the last of her Eloise books, Eloise Takes a Bawth in the 1960s, but it was not published until 2002-some years after her death. Salomone appears again in this book, as he shows the small girl the flood she inadvertently caused while playing in the bath.

Salomone was the manager of the Plaza when The Beatles arrived in the United States for their first Ed Sullivan Show appearance in early 1964. After seeing news footage of the crowds of young girls in the United Kingdom, Salomone worried that having the group as guests might be problematic for the hotel. He thought about canceling The Beatles' reservations, but was persuaded not to do so by his young daughter.

Salomone and his wife, Bernadette, had three children: two sons, Robert and Gregg, and a daughter, Lourdes.
