= Peg Bracken =

American writer (1918–2007)

Ruth Eleanor "Peg" Bracken (February 25, 1918 – October 20, 2007) was an American writer of humorous books on cooking, housekeeping, etiquette and travel.

== Biography ==
Born in Filer, Idaho, Bracken grew up in St. Louis, Missouri and graduated from Antioch College in 1940. She married and moved to Portland, Oregon, where she worked as an advertising copywriter along with Homer Groening, father of Matt Groening. She and Groening also made a comic strip, Phoebe, Get Your Man together. She lived for a number of years in Bolinas, California.

During the 1960s and 1970s, Bracken's writing reassured women that they did not have to be perfect to have a happy, well-managed home. Her best-known book is The I Hate to Cook Book, written in 1960. The book came about when she and some other working-women friends "pooled their ignorance" and came up with a core of recipes strong on ease of preparation. It was followed by The I Hate to Housekeep Book and The Appendix to the I Hate to Cook Book. The two cookbooks were later published together as The Compleat I Hate to Cook Book. All are illustrated with amusing line drawings by Hilary Knight (best known for illustrating Eloise by Kay Thompson). The recipes are distinguished by unusual names and peppered with sardonic comments. For example, one recipe is for "Wolfe Eggs," which are for eggs the way the fictional Nero Wolfe would cook them. "Stayabed Stew" could be left to cook by itself and was perfect "for those days when you are en negligee, en bed, with a murder story and a box of bonbons, or possibly a good case of flu"; mashed potatoes topped with cheese and baked in a casserole become "Spuds O'Grotten". A chapter on vegetables and salads is subtitled "This Side of Beriberi"; her selection of simple family-oriented main dishes is "30 Day-by-Day Entrees, or, The Rock Pile". The recipes themselves were written in much the same style ("Brown the garlic, onion, and crumbled beef in the oil. Add the flour, salt, paprika, and mushrooms, stir, and let it cook five minutes while you light a cigarette and stare sullenly at the sink").

She went on to write books in a similar vein on housekeeping, etiquette and travel. She also wrote humorous pieces for women's magazines.

... in the past few years I have unintentionally made some culinary discoveries, mainly involving prepared foods and easier ways to do things ... I am well aware that to skilled and ardent cooks my innocent pride in these findings will resemble that of the little man who showed up at the Patent Office last year with his new invention, designed for talking across distances, which he had named "the telephone."

Bracken continued writing into her seventies, publishing her last book, On Getting Old for the First Time, in 1997. She died in 2007. The I Hate to Cook Book was updated and re-released in 2010.

She is survived by a daughter, Johanna Bracken, who wrote a foreword for the fiftieth anniversary edition of the I Hate To Cook Book.

== Partial bibliography ==
- The 9-Months' Wonder (with Helen Berry Moore)
- The I Hate to Cook Book (1960)
- The I Hate to Housekeep Book (1962), a book of household hints
- I Try to Behave Myself (1964), an etiquette guide
- Appendix to the I Hate to Cook Book (1966)
- I Still Hate to Cook Book (1967) UK edition
- I Didn't Come Here to Argue (1969)
- Instant Etiquette (1969) UK edition
- But I Wouldn't Have Missed It for the World (1973), described as "the pleasures and perils of an unseasoned traveller"
- The I Hate to Cook Book of the Year: A Book of Days (1977) UK edition
- The I Hate to Cook Almanack (1980)
- A Window Over the Sink (1986), "a mainly affectionate memoir" ISBN 0-15-196986-8
- The Compleat I Hate to Cook Book (1988) ISBN 0-553-27130-X
- On Getting Old for the First Time (1997) ISBN 1-885221-53-3
- (collected in) American Food Writing: An Anthology with Classic Recipes, ed. Molly O'Neill (Library of America, 2007) ISBN 1-59853-005-4
