= Anthony Hanzlik =

American aviator (1903–1974)

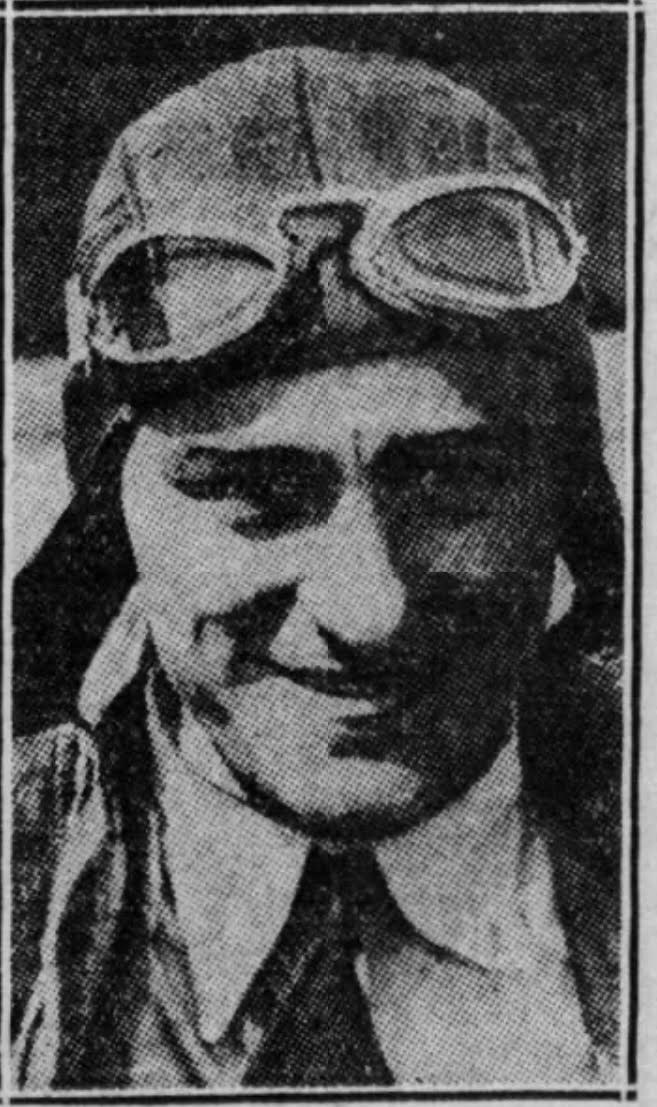
- Born: August 9, 1903; Manhattan, New York, US
- Died: July 17, 1974 (aged 70); Queens, New York, US
- Burial place: Saint Michael's Cemetery
- Occupations: Pilot, airport manager
- Known for: Manager of Flushing Airport
- Spouse: Wilhelmina "Willie" Hanzlik

Anthony "Speed" Hanzlik (August 9, 1903 – July 17, 1974) was an American aviator and aerial photographer known for managing Flushing Airport in Queens, New York, from 1936 until his death. Hanzlik earned his nickname "Speed" while working as a messenger boy at the Wright-Martin Aircraft factory in Long Island City. He worked alongside famous pilots such as Eddie Rickenbacker and Jimmy Doolittle. During World War II, he played a role in the Clayton Knight Committee, which covertly recruited American pilots to serve in the Royal Canadian Air Force (RCAF) before the United States entered the war.

== Early life and career ==
Anthony Hanzlik was born in Manhattan in 1903 to a family that had immigrated from Czechoslovakia. He started his flying career around 1920, shortly after World War I, at a time when pilot licensing was not yet standardized. His early experiences included flying with notable aviators like Eddie Rickenbacker and Jimmy Doolittle, both of whom became lifelong friends. Hanzlik earned the nickname "Speed" from his role as a swift messenger at the Wright-Martin Aircraft factory.

In 1927, Hanzlik leased city owned land in College Point, and opened Speed's Airport, which he managed until it was renamed Flushing Airport in 1939. He continued as manager until his death in 1974, becoming a fixture of Queens aviation. Known for his aerial photography skills, Hanzlik flew hazardous news assignments for New York City newspapers and piloted photographers capturing iconic images. The airport was used in several films, including Blaze of Noon and The Spirit of St. Louis, starring Jimmy Stewart.

== Role in the Clayton Knight Committee ==
In 1941, Hanzlik was appointed Director of Queens Aviation and took on a key role in the Clayton Knight Committee. This secretive organization, founded by aviator and artist Clayton Knight, recruited American civilian pilots to join the Royal Canadian Air Force to aid the Allies before the U.S. entered World War II.

Hanzlik conducted physical examinations and flight tests for applicants in the eastern United States, selecting only highly skilled men with over 300 hours of flight time and under 34 years old. The committee helped bolster Allied air strength by enlisting thousands of American pilots, maintaining an excellent safety record throughout its operations.

== Legacy and later life ==
Hanzlik passed away on July 17, 1974, at his home in Flushing, Queens. His funeral was attended by many, including lifelong friends and famous pilots Eddie Rickenbacker and Jimmy Doolittle. His wife, Wilhelmina Hanzlik, a licensed pilot since 1934, continued managing Flushing Airport.
