= Eloise (upcoming film) =

Upcoming film by Amy Sherman-Palladino

- Directed by: Amy Sherman-Palladino
- Screenplay by: Amy Sherman-Palladino; Hannah Marks
- Story by: Hannah Marks; Linda Woolverton
- Based on: Eloise by Kay Thompson
- Produced by: Ashley Fox; Johnny Pariseau; Linda Woolverton; Amy Sherman-Palladino
- Starring: Mae Schenk; Ryan Reynolds; Sally Hawkins; Victor Garber
- Cinematography: M. David Mullen
- Production companies: MRC; HandMade Films; Maximum Effort
- Distributed by: Netflix
- Country: United States
- Language: English

Eloise at the Plaza is an upcoming American adventure comedy film co-written and directed by Amy Sherman-Palladino. It is based on the Eloise book series written by Kay Thompson and illustrated by Hilary Knight. The film stars Mae Schenk in the titular role, alongside Ryan Reynolds, Sally Hawkins, and Victor Garber.

The film is scheduled to be released on Netflix.

== Cast ==
- Mae Schenk as Eloise
- Ryan Reynolds
- Sally Hawkins
- Victor Garber
- David Haig
- Max Casella
- Isaac Bae

== Production ==
In April 2008, it was reported that a film based on Eloise in Paris by Kay Thompson was in the works with Jordana Beatty as the title character and Uma Thurman cast as Nanny; Charles Shyer would direct from a screenplay by Shyer, Hallie Meyers-Shyer and Larry Spencer. However, production stalled and in January 2009, Thurman filed a lawsuit against the production company HandMade Films after the company failed to meet her initial pay-or-play fee. Ultimately, the lawsuit was settled for $8 million.

By 2020, the film re-entered development with Linda Woolverton writing the script and HandMade Films co-producing with MRC. In 2024, Paramount Pictures signed on to distribute the film. In August 2025, it was reported Amy Sherman-Palladino had written the most recent draft of the script and that a casting search was underway for the titular role. In November 2025, newcomer Mae Schenk was cast in the lead role, while Ryan Reynolds would portray an antagonist; Sherman-Palladino would direct and co-wrote the script with Woolverton and Hannah Marks, with the film now set to be distributed by Netflix. The rest of the cast was announced in January 2026, with principal photography having begun in London in November 2025. M. David Mullen is the cinematographer. In May 2026, additional filming occurred in New York City including at the Plaza Hotel. In November 2026, the film was announced to have been retitled from Eloise to Eloise at the Plaza.
