= Eloise: The Animated Series =

Television series

- Title card for episode 1
- Also known as: Me, Eloise!
- Genre: Comedy
- Based on: Eloise by Kay Thompson; Hilary Knight
- Creative director: Wes Archer
- Starring: Mary Matilyn Mouser; Tim Curry; Lynn Redgrave
- Composer: Megan Cavallari
- Countries of origin: United States; United Kingdom
- No. of seasons: 1
- No. of episodes: 13

Production
- Executive producers: Patrick Meehan; Thomas D. Adelman; Steve Brown; Morris Berger; John W. Hyde; Scott D. Greenberg; Sidney Clifton; Ted Green; Ken Lipman
- Producers: Malisa Caroselli; Mike Wolf
- Editor: Mark Seymour
- Running time: 24 minutes
- Production companies: HandMade Films; Starz Media

Original release
- Network: Starz Kids & Family
- Release: October 8 – November 12, 2006

Eloise: The Animated Series or Me, Eloise! is a children's animated comedy television series, based on the Eloise series of children's books drawn and written by Kay Thompson and Hilary Knight. This series features the voices of Mary Matilyn Mouser as Eloise, Lynn Redgrave as the Nanny, and Tim Curry as Mr. Salamone. The television series was produced by Starz Media and HandMade Films in association with Film Roman and animated by Yearim, and aired on Starz Kids & Family from October to November 2006. 13 episodes were produced.

== Plot ==
The show follows Eloise as she attends movie productions, dates, Christmas parties, birthday parties and violin recitals while taking on adventures along with her friends.

== Episode list ==
No.	Title	Summary
1	Me, Eloise (Part 1)	In this self-titled series premiere, it is Eloise's sixth birthday. This episode is based on the book by Kay Thompson.
2	Me, Eloise (Part 2)	On her birthday, Eloise makes a new friend, Yuko, but lands her in trouble. This episode is also based on Kay Thompson's book.
3	Eloise Goes to School (Part 1)	Eloise hates her tutoring, so Nanny assigns for Eloise to go to school.
4	Eloise Goes to School (Part 2)	At her new school, Eloise meets new friends and protects them from a gang of school bullies and faces the strict teacher.
5	Eloise Goes to Hollywood (Part 1)	Eloise travels to Hollywood to audition for a small part in a movie.
6	Eloise Goes to Hollywood (Part 2)	After another actor is fired for her rudeness, Eloise automatically rises to playing one of the main roles and realizes being a movie actor is not what it seems.
7	Eloise's Rawther Unusual Halloween (Part 1)	Eloise and her friends go trick or treating, but strange things are happening in the Plaza.
8	Eloise's Rawther Unusual Halloween (Part 2)	When no one seems to be in the Plaza anymore, Eloise enters the ghostly seventeenth floor of the Plaza and helps the ghost of Diamond Jim Johnson scare someone. Meanwhile, some men are plotting to take over the Plaza hotel.
9	Eloise in Springtime (Part 1)	When Nanny goes on a vacation, Eloise gets a fun new caretaker called Nicole.
10	Eloise in Springtime (Part 2)	Eloise enjoys her time with Nicole until she and Bill, Eloise's friend, fall in love with each other, pushing Eloise out of her place in life. When Eloise pushes the two apart, she realizes what she has done.
11	Little Miss Christmas (Part 1)	It is Christmas in the Plaza, but no one seems to care that the holiday is approaching and Eloise's poor friend Mattias may not even have Christmas.
12	Little Miss Christmas (Part 2)	Eloise and her friends decide to help Mattias and the residents of the Plaza by holding a Christmas party.
13	Little Miss Christmas (Part 3)	In the series finale, Eloise's Christmas party is held, but Bill is late for his appearance as Santa Claus. While they are waiting for him, everyone learns the true meaning of Christmas.

== Cast ==
=== Characters with unknown voice actors ===
- Corky
- Debbie and Anne Lincoln
- Diego
- Elevator Man (when he sings in Christmas episode)
- Eloise's mother (appears at the end of Christmas episode)
- False Doctor
- Matteus
- Monte
- Taylor

=== Recurring roles ===
Identified:

- Mary Mouser - Eloise
- Lynn Redgrave - Nanny
- Tim Curry - Mr. Salamone
- Jeff Bennett - Charlie the doorman
- Kathleen Gati - Mrs. Thornton
- Rob Paulsen - Bill
- Candi Milo - Margarita, Betty, Bobby and Bruce
- Tara Strong - Nicole in "Eloise in Springtime", Edwin
- Phil LaMarr - Tyler
- Lauren Tom - Noelle in "Eloise Goes to School"
- Dionne Quan - Yuko Takahashi
- April Winchell - Betty's mother, secretary and Janet Palmer in "Eloise Goes to Hollywood", three tutor candidates in "Eloise Goes to School"
- Neil Patrick Harris - Philip, Eloise's tutor

Uncredited:

=== One-shot roles ===
Identified:

- Doris Roberts - Mrs. Hedwig in "Eloise Goes to School"
- Brad Garrett - Diamond Jim Johnson in the Halloween episode
- James Belushi - as himself, in the Halloween episode
- Clyde Kusatsu as Mr. Takahashi, Yuko's father in the Christmas episode
- Matthew Lillard - Monsieur Ducat in the Christmas episode

Uncredited:

- Curtis Armstrong - character in episode 1
- Henry Gibson - character in "Eloise Goes to School"
- Tony Jay - Gavin in "Eloise in Springtime"

==== Additional voices ====
Voices in "Eloise Goes to Hollywood":

- Alan Cumming -
- Cynthia Nixon -
- Jason Marsden -
- Kevin Michael Richardson
- Lacey Chabert -
- Liliana Mumy -
- Nestor Carbonell -
- Jane Lynch

== Crew ==
- Charlie Adler - casting and voice director
- Wes Archer - creative director

== DVD releases ==
- It's Me, Eloise (October 10, 2006)
- Little Miss Christmas (October 10, 2006)
- Eloise in Hollywood (March 13, 2007)
- Eloise Goes to School (July 24, 2007)
- Eloise in Springtime (February 26, 2008)
- Eloise's Rawther Unusual Halloween (September 2, 2008)
