= Ace Drummond (serial) =

1936 film

- Film poster for Chapter 8
- Directed by: Ford Beebe; Clifford Smith
- Starring: John 'Dusty' King; Jean Rogers; Noah Beery Jr. Lon Chaney Jr.
- Cinematography: Richard Fryer
- Distributed by: Universal Pictures
- Release date: October 19, 1936
- Running time: 13 chapters (258 min)
- Country: United States
- Language: English

Ace Drummond, Chapter 1: Where East Meets West

Ace Drummond, Chapter 2: The Invisible Enemy

Ace Drummond, Chapter 3: The Doorway of Doom

Ace Drummond is a Universal Pictures 1936 film serial based on the comic strip "Ace Drummond" written by Captain Eddie Rickenbacker and drawn by Clayton Knight. The serial's cast features John King, Jean Rogers, Noah Beery Jr. and Jackie Morrow, with Lon Chaney Jr. in a supporting role.

== Plot ==
A mysterious villain who calls himself the Dragon is attempting to prevent International Airways from beginning service in Mongolia, in order to protect the secret of the mountain of jade for himself.

The serial features a dungeon in the nearby monastery, the kidnapping of an archeologist who stumbles onto the secret, his daughter's attempts to rescue him with Ace's help, a death ray the Dragon uses on the airline pilots, a radio system by which The Dragon communicates with his henchmen via the rotation of Buddhist prayer wheels (each transmission concluding "The Dragon commands!"), and a squadron of his own fighter planes.

== Cast ==
- John King as Ace Drummond
- Jean Rogers as Peggy Trainor
- Noah Beery Jr. as Jerry
- Jackie Morrow as Billy Meredith
- Selmer Jackson as Mr. Meredith
- Guy Bates Post as the Grand Lama
- C. Montague Shaw as Trainor
- Frederick Vogeding as Bauer
- Al Bridge as Wyckoff
- Chester Gan as Kai-chek
- James B. Leong as Henry Kee
- James Eagles as Johnny Wong
- Arthur Loft as Chang Ho/The Dragon
- Lon Chaney Jr. as Henchman Ivan
- Stanley Blystone as Henchman Sergei
- Edmund Cobb as Henchman Nikolai
- Richard Wessel as Henchman Boris

together with: Sam Ash as LePage; Hooper Atchley as Caldoni; Louis Vincenot as Lo Tan; Eddie Parker as Dmitri; Tom Steele and George De Normand as Other Henchman; Russell Wade as Pilot; House Peters Jr. as Co-Pilot; Diana Gibson as Stewardess; and Ed Piel Sr. as Passenger.

== Production ==
Ace Drummond was based on a comic strip by Captain Eddie Rickenbacker.

Ace Drummond gained good publicity following a set visit by Amelia Earhart. The famous aviator had driven out to the San Fernando Valley, after hearing that the serial was being shot there on location, where she watched the filming of the chapter two cliffhanger.

In the traditional foreword at the beginning of each chapter, Ace Drummond used comic strips to summarise the story so far. This worked well, and Universal who had been trying to get away from using written text in its forewords, used "similar gimmicks" in their succeeding serials.

=== Music ===
Ace also regularly performs his theme song, "Give Me a Ship and a Song".

== Critical reception ==
In the words of Cline, Ace Drummond "exuded the futuristic aura of Flash Gordon combined with the eerie mystery of Baron Frankenstein's castle laboratory."

== Chapter titles ==
- Chapter 1 - Where East Meets West
- Chapter 2 - The Invisible Enemy
- Chapter 3 - The Doorway of Doom
- Chapter 4 - The Radio Riddle
- Chapter 5 - Bullets of Sand
- Chapter 6 - Evil Spirits
- Chapter 7 - The Trackless Trail
- Chapter 8 - The Sign in the Sky
- Chapter 9 - Secret Service
- Chapter 10 - The Mountain of Jade
- Chapter 11 - The Dragon Commands
- Chapter 12 - The Squadron of Death
- Chapter 13 - The World's Akin

_{Source for titles:}

== See also ==
- List of American films of 1936
