= Heritage of Anger =

- Playhouse 90 episode
- Bellamy, Foch, and Bridges in "Heritage of Anger"
- Episode no.: Season 1 Episode 7
- Directed by: Vincent J. Donehue
- Written by: Harold Jack Bloom
- Original air date: November 15, 1956

Guest appearances
- Ralph Bellamy as Eddie Hanneman; Nina Foch as Libby Hanneman; Lloyd Bridges as Paul Fletcher; John Ericson as Johnny Hanneman

Episode chronology
← Previous "The Big Slide"	Next → "Eloise"

"Heritage of Anger" was an American television play broadcast on November 15, 1956, as part of the CBS television series, Playhouse 90. It was the seventh episode of the series.

== Plot ==
Industrialist Eddie Hanneman learns that his sons do not wish to take over the business that he has built. Son John Ericson aspires to be a jet pilot. However, his sales manager, Paul Fletcher, does wish to take over the business.

== Cast ==
Kay Thompson hosted the program, which included performances by the following cast.

- Ralph Bellamy as Eddie Hanneman
- Nina Foch as Libby Hanneman
- Lloyd Bridges as Paul Fletcher
- John Ericson as Johnny Hanneman
- Tom Brown as Arthur Hanneman
- Onslow Stevens as Sidney Lennox

== Production ==
The play was staged at CBS Television City in Los Angeles. It was directed by Vincent J. Donehue. The teleplay was written by Harold Jack Bloom.

== Reception ==
In The New York Times, J. P. Shanley called it "an engrossing study" that "moved swiftly and absorbingly to an exciting and believable climax." Shanley also praised Bloom for "an expertly constructed script" Donehue for "fine direction", and Bellamy, Ericson, Foch, and Bridges for "outstanding portrayals."

In The Boston Globe, Mary Cremmen called it "arresting drama" "admirably executed".
