= Evelyn Rudie =

American actress

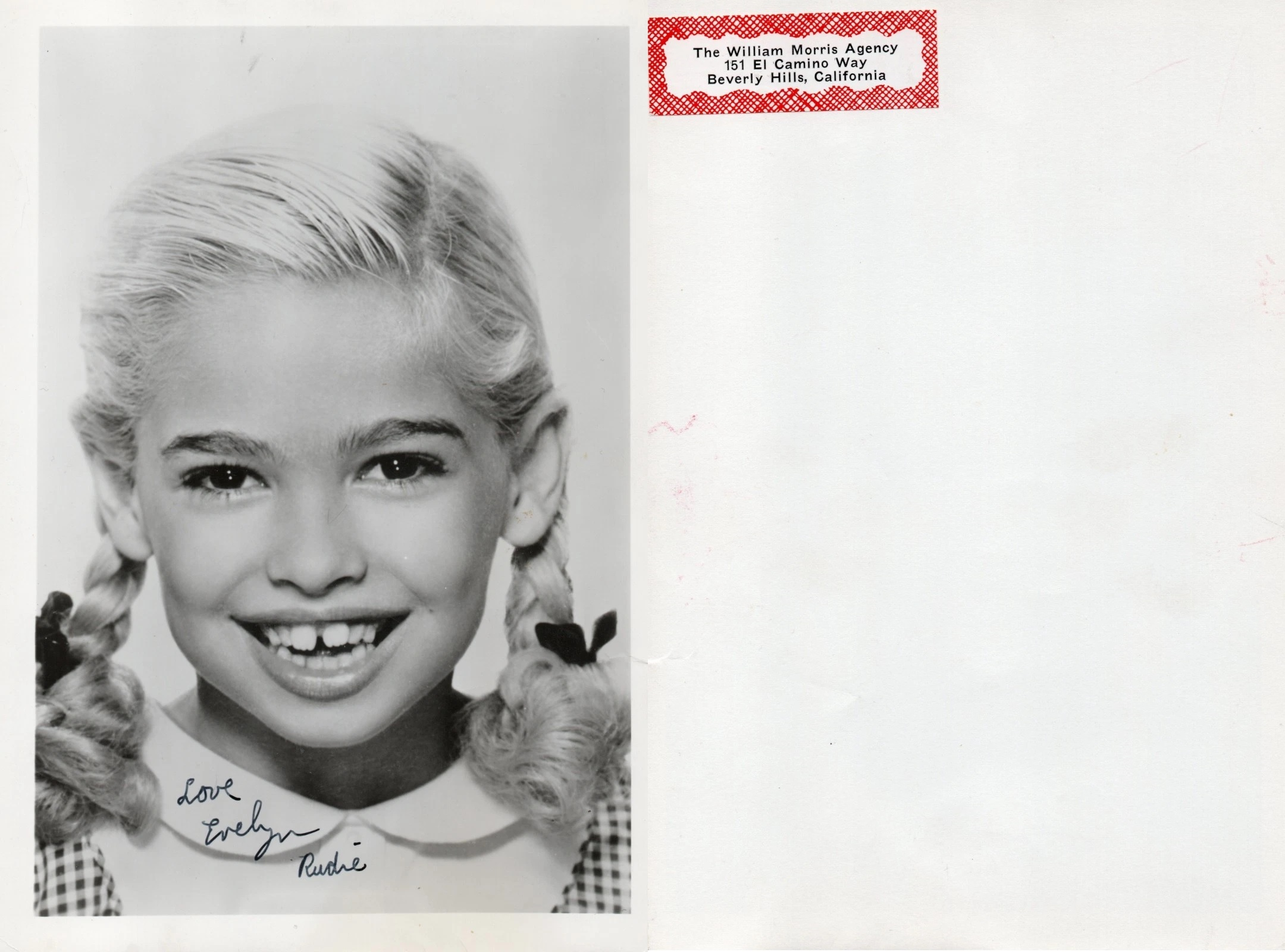
- Rudie c. 1957
- Occupations: Actress, playwright, director, songwriter, teacher
- Years active: 1952–1961 (film)
- Spouses: Tim O'Kelly (m. 1968; div. 1968) Chris DeCarlo (m. 1970)

Evelyn Rudie is an American playwright, director, songwriter, film and television actress, and teacher. Since 1973, she has been the co-artistic director of the Santa Monica Playhouse. As a costume designer, she uses the pseudonym Ashley Hayes.

== Early years ==
Rudie is the daughter of Edith and Emery Bernauer. Austrian lyricist, librettist, screenwriter, film director, producer, and actor Rudolf Bernauer was her grandfather. When she was 9 years old she disappeared from her home, apparently as a result of disappointment that her career was progressing slowly. She was found hours later on a jet plane, in an apparent effort to visit the White House with hopes that Mamie Eisenhower could help her get a series on television.

At age 3, Rudie portrayed an orphan child in the film Daddy Long Legs.

== Radio and television ==
Rudie became an overnight star, in 1956, with her performance in the title role of the episode "Eloise" on television's Playhouse 90. It brought her critical acclaim, much press coverage, and an Emmy nomination at age six—the first time a child actress was so honored. She returned to Playhouse 90 the following year, portraying the young Perle Mesta in The Hostess with the Mostest.

The television "Eloise" was an adaptation of the popular book by Kay Thompson, which owed much to the delicate line illustrations of Hilary Knight. The marketing of "Eloise" and the subsequent book sequels practically always featured the illustrations of Knight, and numerous photographs were published in the 1950s of Rudie in the role. Her popularity as a child star led to the merchandising of at least one product which did not associate her with the character of Eloise, Evelyn Rudie Paper Dolls (Saalfield, 1958).

During the late 1950s, she also appeared on Alfred Hitchcock Presents, General Electric Theater, Lawman, The Red Skelton Show, and Wagon Train, along with seven appearances on The Tonight Show with Jack Paar. During this period, she also was an actress on radio programs, including Suspense.

Nine-year-old Evelyn Rudie appeared as a contestant on the October 29, 1959, episode of the TV quiz program You Bet Your Life, hosted by Groucho Marx. Rudie danced a waltz with her fellow contestant and told a joke in the German language. The pair earned $500.

After appearing uncredited in director George Sidney's Bye Bye Birdie (1963), she focused on education. Over a 36-year span, she has given more than 10,000 stage performances in 350 plays.

Rudie's star on the Hollywood Walk of Fame is located at the corner of Hollywood and Highland.

== Santa Monica Playhouse ==
In 1973 Rudie and her husband, Chris DeCarlo, became artistic directors and performers for the Santa Monica Playhouse. The playhouse offers educational opportunities, including online workshops and in-person theater camps.

== Select filmography ==
=== Films ===
- Daddy Long Legs (1955) as Codene, the Orphan Girl (uncredited)
- The View from Pompey's Head (1955) as Cecily Higgins
- Hot Shots (1956) as Annie (uncredited)
- Playhouse 90: Eloise credited as "Eloise as Herself" (1956) (Season 1 Episode 8: "Eloise") / Young Pearl Mesta (1957) (Season 1 Episode 25: "The Hostess with the Mostess")
- The Wings of Eagles (1957) as Doris Wead (uncredited)
- The Restless Breed (1957) as Kehta
- The Gift of Love (1958) as Mehitabel aka Hitty
- Bye Bye Birdie (uncredited, 1963)

== Television ==
- Alfred Hitchcock Presents (season 2 episode 33: "A Man Greatly Beloved") (1957) as Hildegarde Fell
- Wagon Train ("The Millie Davis Story"; 1958) as Penny
- General Electric Theater (episode "Nobody's Child", 1959, with Ronald Reagan and Diane Brewster)
- 77 Sunset Strip (1960) as Angel

== Personal life ==
Rudie has been married to Chris DeCarlo since August 24, 1970. She was previously married to actor Tim O'Kelly.
