= Salomone =

Salomone is a surname. Notable people with the surname include:

- Alphonse W. Salomone Jr. (1919–1993), Canadian-American hotelier
- Bruno Salomone (1970–2026), French actor and comedian
- Marco Antonio Salomone (died 1615), Roman Catholic prelate
- Rocco Salomone (1965–2015), American football coach
