= Jack Jenney =

American jazz trombonist (1910–1945)

- Born: Truman Eliot Jenney; May 12, 1910; Mason City, Iowa, U.S.
- Died: December 16, 1945 (aged 35) Los Angeles, California, U.S.
- Genres: Jazz
- Instruments: Trombone, trumpet
- Spouse: Kay Thompson (m. 1937; div. 1939)

Truman Eliot "Jack" Jenney (May 12, 1910 – December 16, 1945) was an American jazz trombonist.

== Early life ==
Born in Mason City, Iowa, Jenney first played trumpet, then switched to trombone. His father was a musician and music teacher. Jenney performed in his father's band from age 11, but his professional work began with Austin Wylie in 1928.

== Career ==
During his career, Jenney worked with Isham Jones, Red Norvo, Artie Shaw, Mal Hallett, and Waring's Pennsylvanians. He appeared in the film Syncopation. He has been called "the greatest trombonist of the Big Band era" and won the DownBeat Reader's Poll for trombone in 1940.

He led his own band for a year in 1938 and 1939, but it was a financial failure. He was drafted into the United States Navy in 1943, but also played as a studio musician the following year.

== Death ==
He died on December 16, 1945, in Los Angeles, from complications following an appendectomy.
