= Katherine Sturges Dodge =

American writer and illustrator (1890–1979)

Katherine Sturges
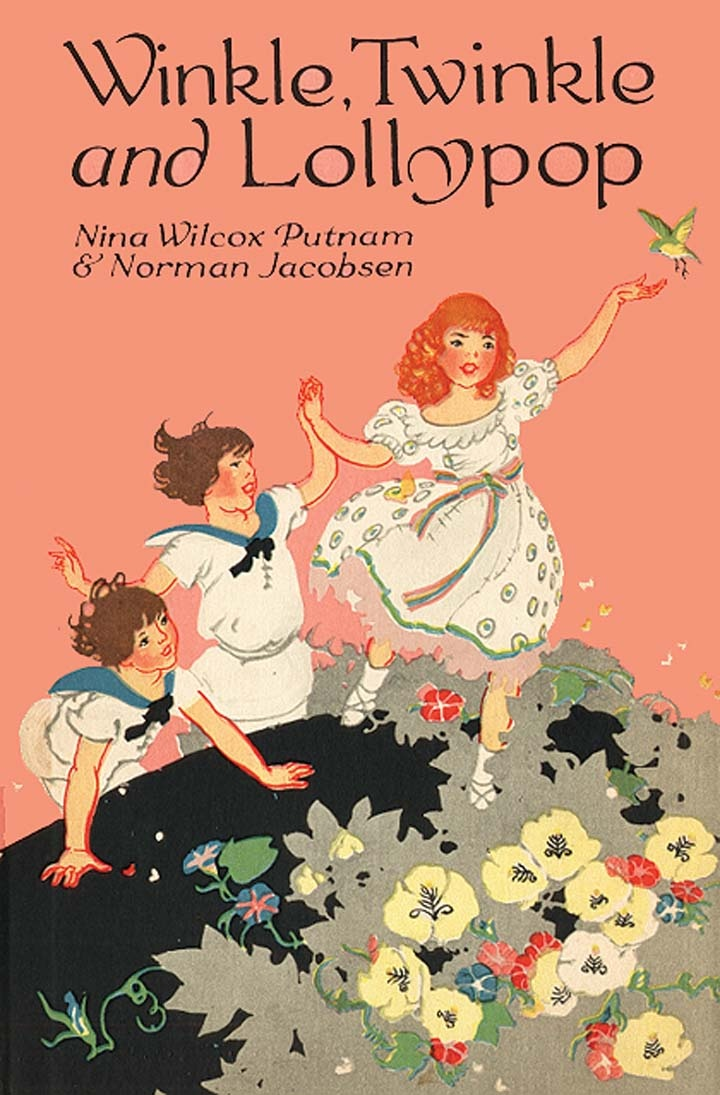
- Winkle, Twinkle and Lollypop (1918)
- Born: August 13, 1890; Chicago, Illinois, US
- Died: January 12, 1979 (aged 88); New York City, US
- Other name: Katherine Sturges Knight
- Occupations: Writer and illustrator
- Spouse: Clayton Knight
- Children: Hilary Knight

Katharine Sturges or Katherine Sturges Knight (August 13, 1890 – January 12, 1979) was an American writer and illustrator. She illustrated books, ceramics and magazines as well as designing jewelry. She collaborated with a number of authors including her husband Clayton Knight. The artist Hilary Knight is her son and he says that his most famous image of Eloise was inspired by one of his mother's paintings.

== Life ==
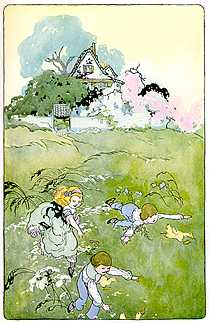
From Winkle, Twinkle and Lollypop from 1918

She was born in Chicago in 1890 and she studied at the School of The Art Institute of Chicago. Her early work included illustrating children's books for P. F. Volland Company of Chicago. Between 1913 and 1921, she created several examples including Short Stories of Musical Melodies. She was sent to Japan to study oriental art and she used this experience when she published Little Pictures of Japan in 1925.

Sturges married Clayton Knight, who was a World War One pilot who went on to become an illustrator and writer. They occasionally worked together as they did on fabric designs and on two "We Were There" books. Sturges illustrated a range of books, but she also created fashion drawings for Harper's Bazaar. In 1929, she was amongst a group of artists and designers like her husband, Ralph Barton and Helen Dryden who were offering "message prints" on silk for "flappers" to wear at Palm Beach. She took on a range of work that included advertising artwork for McCullum hosiery and silver designs by Oneida Limited. Sturges also created fabric and jewellery designs that were inspired by Peruvian culture after she was sent by the department store, Macy's, to South America.

The British ceramic company Spode employed Sturges to create designs. One of the more unusual commissions was a toile decorated with pictures from the career of President Eisenhower which is used at the US Presidents guest residence Blair House.

== Family ==
Katherine Sturges and Clayton Knight had two sons, Clayton Joseph Knight, born in 1924 and Hilary Knight, born in 1926. Hilary was also to become a writer and illustrator. He is best known for illustrating the Eloise books. Hilary says that he based the image for Eloise on a painting that his mother had made in the 1930s. Clayton Joseph died in 1963. Clayton, her husband, died in 1969.

Sturges died in New York City in 1979 after a long illness. She was buried in Umpawaug Cemetery in Redding in Connecticut, where her husband was also buried.

== Works include ==
- illust.: Short Stories of Musical Melodies, 1915
- illust.: How Sing Found the World is Round (Chicago: P. F. Volland, c. 1921), by Sydney Reid
- illust.: Tales of Little Cats (juvenile adaptation; New York: McLoughlin Bros., 1889), by Carrie Jacobs-Bond
- illust.: Winkle, Twinkle and Lollypop, by Nina Wilcox Putnam and Norman Jacobsen
- illust.: Why the Chimes Rang and Other Stories (Indianapolis: The Bobbs-Merrill Company, 1924), by Raymond MacDonald Alden
- illust.: Little Pictures of Japan, 1925.
- illust.: The Rhymes of Goochy Googles and his Pollywog named Woggles, (McLoughlin Bros. Inc. 1926) by Andrew F. Underhill
