= We Were There =

Children's book series

Cover of We Were There on the Chisholm Trail, the 14th book in the series

The We Were There books are a series of historical novels written for children. The series consists of 36 titles, first released between 1955 and 1963 by Grosset & Dunlap. Each book in the series is a fictional retelling of an historical event, featuring one or more children as primary characters. The books were written by a number of different authors, each writing from one to seven of the books; the authors included Benjamin Appel, Jim Kjelgaard, Earl Schenck Miers, William O. Steele, and others. Each book's byline also lists a separate "historical consultant", who was a specialist in the historic topic covered by that particular book. The historical consultants were typically college professors or, in the case of war-related stories, retired military officers; among the more noteworthy consultants for the series were the historians Bruce Catton, Walter Prescott Webb and A. B. Guthrie, Jr. The books are illustrated with black-and-white line art, with color drawings on the dust jacket.

The dust jackets of the original printings of the books describe the series as follows:

We Were There books are easy to read and provide exciting, entertaining stories, based upon true historic events. Each story is checked for factual accuracy by an outstanding authority on this particular phase of our history. Though written simply enough for young readers, they make interesting reading for boys and girls well into their teens.

The original hardbound editions (with dust jackets) of the books were followed by several other printings, including editions for book clubs and libraries. The books were later reissued with hardbound pictorial covers (using the original dust jacket artwork), and softcover editions of some books became available in the 1970s. Three of the books are available from Lamppost Publishers and American Home School Publishers.

== List of We Were There titles ==
	Title	Author	Year
1	We Were There on the Oregon Trail	William O. Steele	1955
2	We Were There at the Battle of Gettysburg	Alida Sims Malkus	1955
3	We Were There at the Boston Tea Party	Robert N. Webb	1956
4	We Were There with Byrd at the South Pole	Charles S. Strong	1956
5	We Were There at the Normandy Invasion	Clayton Knight	1956
6	We Were There in the Klondike Gold Rush	Benjamin Appel	1956
7	We Were There with the Mayflower Pilgrims	Robert N. Webb	1955
8	We Were There with the Pony Express	William O. Steele	1956
9	We Were There with the California Forty-Niners	Stephen Holt	1960
10	We Were There with Ethan Allen and the Green Mountain Boys	Robert N. Webb	1956
11	We Were There with Jean Lafitte at New Orleans	Iris Vinton	1957
12	We Were There at the Oklahoma Land Run	Jim Kjelgaard	1957
13	We Were There at the Battle for Bataan	Benjamin Appel	1957
14	We Were There on the Chisholm Trail	Ross McLaury Taylor	1957
15	We Were There at Pearl Harbor	Felix Sutton	1957
16	We Were There with Richard the Lionhearted in the Crusades	Robert N. Webb	1957
17	We Were There when Washington Won at Yorktown	Earl Schenck Miers	1958
18	We Were There at the Battle of the Alamo	Margaret Cousins	1958
19	We Were There at the Opening of the Erie Canal	Enid Lamonte Meadowcroft	1958
20	We Were There at the Battle of Lexington and Concord	Felix Sutton	1958
21	We Were There with Florence Nightingale in the Crimea	Robert N. Webb	1958
22	We Were There with Lewis and Clark	James Munves	1959
23	We Were There when Grant Met Lee at Appomattox	Earl Schenck Miers	1960
24	We Were There at the Battle of Britain	Clayton Knight and Katherine Sturges Knight	1959
25	We Were There with Cortes and Montezuma	Benjamin Appel	1959
26	We Were There with the California Rancheros	Stephen Holt	1960
27	We Were There with Caesar's Legions	Robert N. Webb	1960
28	We Were There at the First Airplane Flight	Felix Sutton	1960
29	We Were There on the Santa Fe Trail	Ross McLaury Taylor	1960
30	We Were There with Charles Darwin on H.M.S. Beagle	Philip Eisenberg	1960
31	We Were There at the Driving of the Golden Spike	David Shepherd	1960
32	We Were There at the Opening of the Atomic Era	James Munves	1959
32a	We Were There at the Manhattan Project	James Munves	1959
33	We Were There with the Lafayette Escadrille	Clayton Knight and Katherine Sturges Knight	1961
34	We Were There at the Battle of the Bulge	David Shepherd	1961
35	We Were There on the Nautilus	Robert N. Webb	1961
36	We Were There with Lincoln in the White House	Earl Schenck Miers	1963
