= Ace Drummond =

American comic strip

Eddie Rickenbacker and Clayton Knight's Ace Drummond (April 28, 1935)

Ace Drummond is an aviation comic strip scripted by Eddie Rickenbacker and illustrated by Clayton Knight. In its run, it followed aviator Ace Drummond on his adventures around the world.

Distributed by King Features Syndicate, the strip ran as a Sunday page from at least 1933 to 1939 (the final strip is dated 7 July 1939). According to Rickenbacker's autobiography, at its peak, the strip ran in 135 newspapers.

In 1936, the strip was adapted into a movie serial. Rickenbacker was a key factor in the promotion of this strip through the formation of Eddie Rickenbacker's Junior Pilots Club, displaying the Ace Drummond characters on buttons distributed to listeners.

== See also ==
- Eddie Rickenbacker
- Clayton Knight
