= The Big Slide =

- Playhouse 90 episode
- Episode no.: Season 1 Episode 6
- Directed by: Ralph Nelson
- Written by: Edmund Beloin and Dean Riesner
- Original air date: November 8, 1956

Episode chronology
← Previous "The Country Husband"	Next → "Heritage of Anger"

"The Big Slide" was an American television play broadcast on November 8, 1956, as part of the CBS television series, Playhouse 90. It was the sixth episode of the first season of Playhouse 90. Red Skelton and Shirley Jones starred in the play about a silent movie star. Skelton was nominated for a Primetime Emmy Award for best performance by an actor. Martin Manulis was the producer, and Ralph Nelson was the director.

== Plot ==
A down-and-out vaudeville comedian, Buddy McCoy, becomes a successful silent movie star, but experiences tragedy in his personal life. May Marley is an alcoholic friend who Buddy tries to help.

== Cast ==
- Red Skelton as Buddy McCoy
- Shirley Jones as May Marley
- Murray Hamilton as Chick Tolliver
- Eddie Firestone as Steve Madden
- Jack Albertson as Al St. George
- Jack Mulhall as Joe Ashley
- Fay Spain as Crystal Vail
- Victor Sutherland as L. K. Zimmer
- Ralph Bellamy - host

== Production ==
Martin Manulis was the producer, and Ralph Nelson directed. Edmund Beloin and Dean Riesner wrote the teleplay.

Skelton was nominated for the Primetime Emmy Award for best performance by an actor. The Emmy was awarded to Jack Palance for another Playhouse 90 production, Requiem for a Heavyweight.

== Reception ==
Television writer Eve Starr called Skelton's performance "one of the most moving, powerful and completely believable dramatic performances I have seen in seven-odd years of watching television. Or any other medium, for that matter."

Another television critic, Mary Cremmen, wrote that even those who do not care for Skelton's comedy "could not deny his greatness as a dramatic actor in 'The Big Slide.'"

In The New York Times, J.P. Shanley wrote that "there was something uncomfortably familiar" in the production and "little in the way of an original story."

Critic Charles H. Sanders wrote that "the plot dragged, and even Skelton failed to liven matters up, though he emoted much better than expected."
