= Eloise (Playhouse 90) =

- Playhouse 90 episode
- Evelyn Rudie as Eloise
- Episode no.: Season 1 Episode 8
- Directed by: John Frankenheimer
- Written by: Leonard Spigelgass
- Original air date: November 22, 1956

Guest appearances
- Evelyn Rudie as Eloise; Ethel Barrymore as herself; Louis Jourdan as himself; Kay Thompson as herself

Episode chronology
← Previous "Heritage of Anger"	Next → "Confession"

"Eloise" is an American television play broadcast on November 22, 1956, as part of the CBS television series, Playhouse 90. It was the eighth episode of the series.

== Plot ==
Eloise is a lonesome six-year-old girl who lives with her nanny at the Plaza Hotel.

== Cast ==
June Lockhart hosted the broadcast, which included performances by the following cast.

- Evelyn Rudie as Eloise
- Ethel Barrymore as herself
- Louis Jourdan as himself
- Kay Thompson as herself
- Hans Conried as Rene the French Waiter
- Charlie Ruggles as Murphy
- Mildred Natwick as Nanny
- Jack Mullaney as Eloise's Tutor
- Conrad Hilton as himself
- Maxie Rosenbloom as himself
- Monty Woolley as himself
- William Roerick as Manager of the Plaza
- Inger Stevens as Joanna
- Bartlett Robinson as Eloise's Lawyer

== Production ==
The play was based on Kay Thompson's children's book Eloise. The book was released in June 1955. Leonard Spigelgass wrote the teleplay based on Thompson's book. John Frankenheimer was the director and Martin Manulis the producer. The play was staged at CBS Television City in Los Angeles.

== Reception ==
In The New York Times, Jack Gould panned the production as "totally preposterous television", "sophomoric chaos", "a ludicrous hodgepodge", "agony", "childish" (as opposed to "childlike"), "idiotic and contrived, wholly farcical without being funny".

In the St. Louis Globe-Democrat, John Lester credited Rudie with a "technically remarkable" performance given her age, but opined that the selection of the material "indicates a weakness of basic judgment that could -- and probably will -- result in other offerings, equally superficial and nonsensical".
