= Earl Schenck Miers =

American historian

Earl Schenck Miers (27 May 1910 – 17 November 1972) was an American historian. He wrote over 100 books, mostly about the history of the American Civil War. Some of them were intended for children, including three historic novels in the We Were There series.

== Biography ==
Miers was born in Brooklyn. He moved to Hackensack, New Jersey as a child and started writing with a typewriter while he was in school as his cerebral palsy prevented his ability to write with a pencil.

Miers received honorary degrees from Lincoln College and Rutgers University.

On 17 November 1972, at the age of 62, Miers died at his home in Edison, New Jersey.

== Bibliography ==
- Crossroads of Freedom: The American Revolution and the Rise of a New Nation. by Earl Schenck Miers. New Brunswick, N.J., Rutgers University Press [1971] ISBN 0-8135-0699-9
- Where The Raritan Flows. by Earl Schenck Miers. New Brunswick, N.J., Rutgers University Press [1962]
