= Eloise in Moscow =

Book by Kay Thompson

Eloise in Moscow book cover

Eloise in Moscow is the fourth of the Eloise series of books written by Kay Thompson and illustrated by Hilary Knight. Published in 1959 during the height of the Cold War, it details the titular rich girl's experiences in the Soviet Union.
