= Clayton Knight Committee =

The Clayton Knight Committee was founded by Billy Bishop and Clayton Knight in 1940. Homer Smith and several German émigrés, who wanted America to join the war against the Axis powers, provided funding for the secret and unlawful commissioning agency. Its mission was to bring Americans to Canada in order to prepare and battle for the Allies while the US was still neutral. By Canada allowing the training to take place on their soil, it is considered the most important contribution it made to the Allied air war. This was before the US declared war on Japan and Germany. The committee was forced to defend itself from opposing forces such as, "pacifists and isolationists, the Federal Bureau of Investigation, and President Franklin D. Roosevelt."

== Founding ==
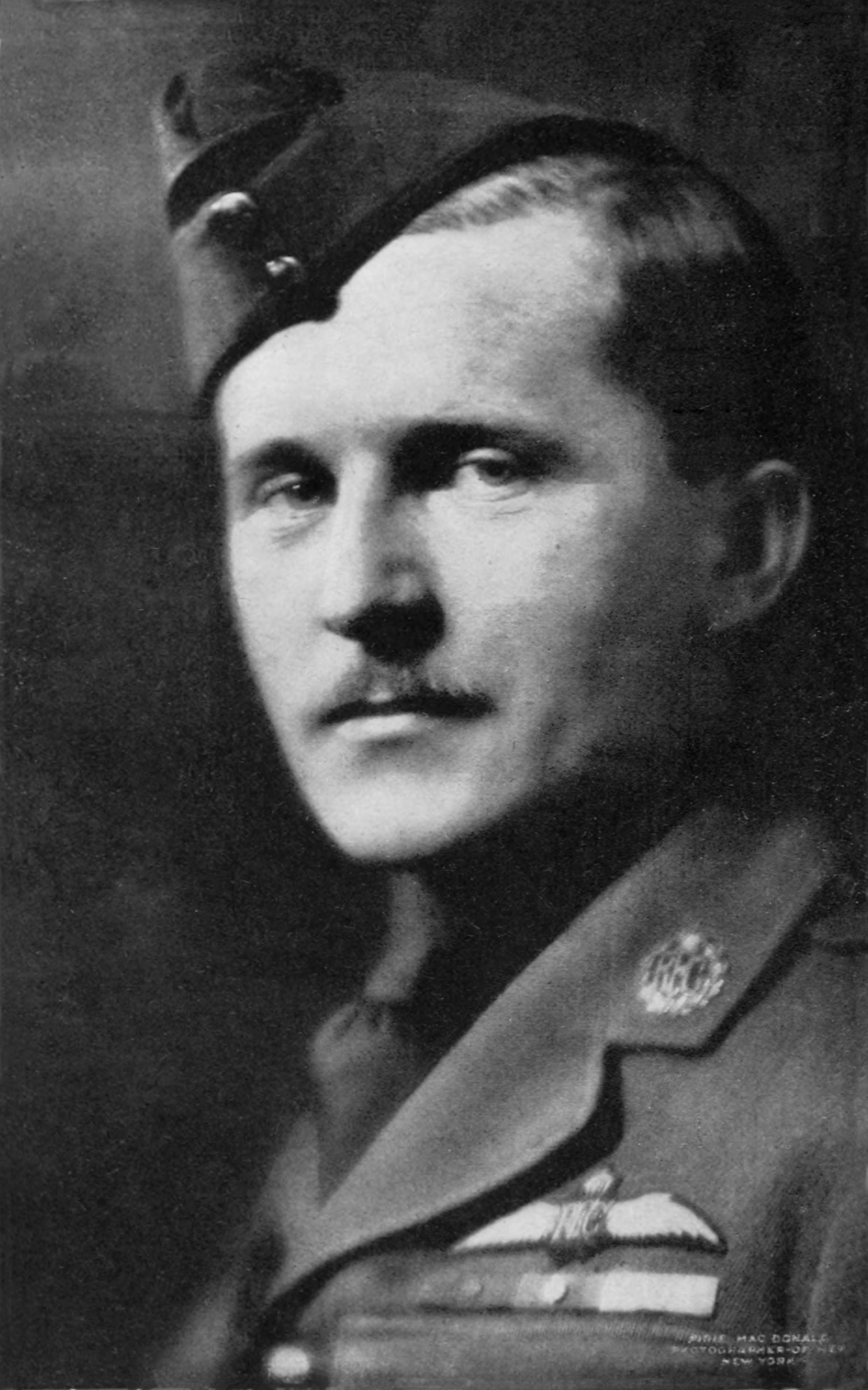
Billy Bishop - 1918

The Clayton Knight Committee (CKC) was founded when Adolf Hitler was enforcing the expansionist policy on Europe. Britain, along with her Commonwealth countries recognized that in order to halt him, they had to establish a dominant air force. Canada, Australia, Britain, and New Zealand created the British Commonwealth Air Training Plan (BCATP). It also went by the 'Empire Air Training Scheme'." Each country had responsibility for varying aspects of the overall plan, such as aircraft engines (Britain), trainers (Britain), cost of elementary trainers (Canada), etc. It had plans to prepare and instruct 150,000 potential airmen.

The advancements of the BCATP would fall on the shoulders of well-known Canadian World War I ace Billy Bishop. His plan was to gain access to the quickly advancing American aviation industry for BCATP. There was a major impasse: "American Neutrality". This resulted in Bishop contacting his friend Clayton Knight. Knight had many connections in American aviation circles. The committee was responsible for 10,000+ American enlistments in the Royal Canadian Air Force (RCAF) before December 7, 1941, the date of the Japan's surprise attack on Pearl Harbor.

The CKC was established in the spring of 1940. The committee used brochures and word of mouth advertising to attract candidates.

The CKC's requirements for pilots were considered lenient by established RAF pilots. Some American pilots exaggerated their flying hours to gain acceptance by the CKC. However, the CKC rejected 86% of the pilots who applied.

Bishop also reached out to Canadian Homer Smith, an ex-pilot. A World War I veteran of the British Royal Naval Air Service, Smith was heir to an oil fortune. Bishop was able to attain support from him financially. Smith also was a source of connections to airline presidents, flying school owners, and Civil Aeronautics Authority officials. He was considered the committee's director. WWI flyer C.R. Fowler also played a role in the committee.

Knight and Bishop revealed to the Air Council in Ottawa that they acquired 36 pilot trainers for the whole BCATP, which had started recruitment in Manhattan. One of their biggest obstacles was the possibility of loss of American citizenship for those who pledged loyalty to the British monarch when entering the RCAF. The State Department was briefed by Canada on the issue and requested that an oath to obey superior officers be substituted for the oath of allegiance. This matter was eventually abolished when the Canadian government enacted an Order in Council that put in place a momentary agreement to adhere to RCAF rules for the length of their time.

Bishop spent a portion of 1940 in London, working with Winston Churchill. This meant Clayton Knight was forced to search for new associates to establish their headquarters. The original headquarters was founded in New York at the Waldorf-Astoria Hotel. Later it expanded to nine cities in America, such as San Francisco, Dallas, and Kansas City. There were offices in Canada as well, to assist those returning to the US after rejection or for those looking for accommodations. Committee expenses were funded through a rotating bank account, which was created in Smith's name.

In May 1940, the committee discussed their plans with Major General Henry H. Arnold and Rear Admiral John Henry Towers. These American military leaders felt that there were plenty of good candidates for pilots available. Arnold even offered to provide the committee with a list of failed candidates from American training efforts.

The CKC had to maintain a low profile to evade possible obstruction by German agents and the hovering F.B.I. They had to find a way to obtain help from the President, even though his publicly stated goal was to prevent America from going to war. Because of the constant hiding, Clayton Knight had to cover up his covert occupation. He used his art and journalistic contacts to work as a "special correspondent for the Associated Press," which posed as a guise from his family. Knight maintained his aviation artwork contributions to publications like The Saturday Evening Post.

The CKC had to ensure that the American pilots crossing the border into Canada had all the proper documents. They also had to fill in civilian instructor and staff pilot positions in the BCATP's Air Observer Schools and Elementary Flying Training Schools. Those who ended up in contact with the CKC were offered positions in the RCAF or RAF or civilian jobs as elementary training instructors, staff pilots, or RAF ferry pilots.

== Attempts to end the committee's operations ==
Many times during 1940, the American State Department and the F.B.I. blocked the committee's work. The committee was encouraged to keep as few records as possible and cease lending travel money to potential recruits. The Dominion Aeronautical Association was founded in January 1941 to create a buffer between the RCAF and the committee. The committee would now seek personnel for civilian positions. The committee's charge was expanded, after consultations with American leaders in Washington, to find personnel for aircrews in 1941.

The United States State Department alerted the Canada Department of External affairs to not shut the CKC down, as long as the committee obeyed American laws.

The financial conduct of the committee and Homer Smith's status on the RCAF reserve list caused major problems. Travel loans were not repaid by potential candidates, which meant they were technically gifts. "Providing funds for an American to join a foreign armed service was a violation of the law against recruiting U.S. nationals." Because Smith was on the RCAF reserve list, he was violating the law which required the registration of agents working for foreign governments. The State Department did not wish to prosecute or close down the committee. They only warned Knight and Smith to "slow down and pull in their horns."

President Roosevelt helped Billy Bishop's work and he ensured that the committee's efforts did not fall afoul of public policy. It was his aim to thwart the Nazi Abwehr spy network which had infiltrated America. The committee was thought to have prevented the success of the German spy rings in New York City.

== Transfer of Americans to the American military ==
In 1941, after the US proclaimed war, a "Recruiting Train" traveled to Canada. Americans who wanted to transfer to the United States Armed Services could do so through the deal Roosevelt had made with the CKC. In total, 2,000 of the 10,000+ Americans serving with the RCAF decided to take advantage of this. The rest remained in the RCAF for the remainder of the war.
