= Eloise (1955 book) =

1955 book by Kay Thompson and Hilary Knight

- Author: Kay Thompson
- Illustrator: Hilary Knight
- Language: English
- Genre: Humour
- Publisher: Simon & Schuster
- Publication date: June 19, 1955; July 10, 1969 (re-release)
- Publication place: United States
- Media type: Print (hardcover and paperback); Audiobook
- ISBN: 978-0671223502
- OCLC: 588120

Eloise (originally titled Eloise: A Book for Precocious Grown-ups) is the first of the Eloise book series written and drawn by Kay Thompson and Hilary Knight, respectively. It was published in 1955. In 1969, the adult-oriented book was re-released as a children's book, without change. An audiobook version of Eloise, narrated by Bernadette Peters, was released in October 2015 to coincide with the 60th anniversary of the series. The title character was inspired by an alter ego of Thompson, a little girl who lives at the Plaza Hotel in New York City.

== Adaptations ==
In 1956, the book was adapted into a 90-minute television play, Eloise, broadcast on the CBS television show Playhouse 90.

Eloise was adapted into a live-action made-for-TV film in April 2003, titled Eloise at the Plaza, produced by DiNovi Pictures and HandMade Films for Walt Disney Television with distribution handled by ABC Television Network. It was released on both VHS and DVD in the same year by Buena Vista Home Entertainment. After the release of the first film, Eloise at Christmastime was released on November 22 on VHS and DVD in the same year.
