= Clayton Knight =

American aviator during World War I

Clayton Knight OBE
- Born: March 30, 1891; Rochester, New York
- Died: July 17, 1969 (aged 78); Danbury, Connecticut
- Spouse: Katherine Sturges Dodge
- Military career
- Allegiance: American
- Branch: U.S. Army Signal Corps
- Service years: 1917–1918
- Other work: Founder of the Clayton Knight Committee; artist, illustrator, and writer

Clayton Knight OBE (March 30, 1891 – July 17, 1969) was an American aviator during World War I. He was also an aviation artist and illustrator, and is known for being one of the founders of the Clayton Knight Committee and the illustrator of the comic strip Ace Drummond.

== Early life and education ==
Rochester, New York was Knight's birthplace. He went to school at the Art Institute of Chicago under famous artists, Robert Henri and George Bellows, from 1910 to 1913. In early 1917, Knight's career as an artist in New York City was flourishing.

== World War I ==
In 1917, Knight volunteered for the U.S. Army Signal Corps. He was most interested in becoming an aviator. Along with 150 other American pilots, Knight was shipped off to England for training during 1917. In total, 2,500 pilots-in-training were transported to France and England. This was done to accelerate the pace of training. He started his training with the No.44 Squadron of the Royal Flying Corps, which was formed in Essex on July 24, 1917. This particular squadron achieved its first triumph on January 28, 1918. Knight also flew with the 206 squadron of the Royal Flying Corps, and subsequently, the Royal Air Force. He served with the British Second Army in France.

On October 5, 1918, Oberleutnant Harald Auffarth fired at Knight's plane causing it to crash. Knight was flying a British Havilland 9 at the time and, although hurt, he survived the crash landing on German territory. By the time the war ended, Knight was a prisoner of war at a German clinic. He was able to recuperate in a British ward.

== Career ==
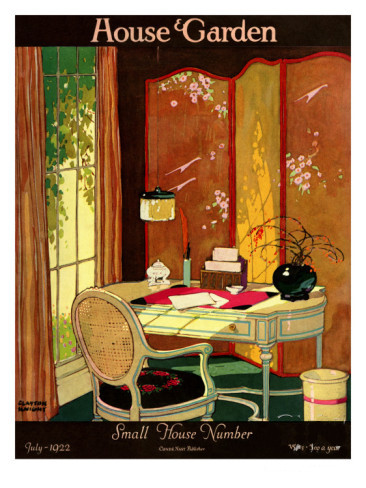
An example of his work for \\House & Garden\\ in 1922

=== Artwork and writing ===
After his recovery, Knight continued his career as an aviation artist. He exhibited his artwork at Associated American Artists. It is possible that his acquisition of airplane art, which he started acquiring in 1928, may be the most extensive collection of airplane art. Knight became known for his illustrations in aviation books. He also illustrated for The New Yorker.

Knight and his wife were also illustrators of children's books, and often collaborated. He wrote and illustrated a few We Were There books, which were historical novels for children. This particular series was written as a fictional retelling of a historical event, featuring kids as the primary characters. He wrote and illustrated, We Were There...at the Normandy Invasion, We Were There...with the Lafayette Escadrille, and We Were There...at the Battle of Britain, the latter written with his wife. Both Knight and his wife were illustrators for the P. F. Volland Company, most known for publishing children's books. Knight's children's book, The Non-Stop Stowaway: The Story of a Long Distance Flight (1928) was published under the Buzza Company imprint.

Knight was the author, co-author, and/or illustrator of many other books including:

- War Birds: Diary of an Unknown Aviator (1926) OCLC 2218858
- The Red Knight of Germany: The Story of Baron von Richthofen (1927)
- Pilot's Luck (1929)
- Ships Aloft: A Construction Book for Future Flyers (1936)
- Quest of the Golden Condor (1945)
- Secret of the Buried Tomb (1948)
- Skyroad to Mystery (1949)
- Hitch your Wagon-Bernt Balchen (1950)
- The Story of Flight (1954)
- Normandy Invasion (1956)
- Lifeline in the Sky- MATS (1957)
- Plane Crash (1958)
- Battle of Britain (1959)
- About our Armed Forces (1959)
- The How and Why Book of Rockets and Missiles (1960)
- Layfayette Escadrille (1961)
- Rockets, Missiles and Satellites (1962)

=== Clayton Knight Committee ===
Knight formed The Clayton Knight Committee in 1940 with Billy Bishop. Knight was living in Greenwich Village at the time. Its mission was to bring Americans to Canada in order to prepare and fight for the Allies during the time of U.S. neutrality. The committee was funded by Homer Smith, and assisted by pro-war German émigrés. Essentially it worked as a secret and illegal recruitment company. From 1939 to 1942, Knight's "job" was "Special Correspondent for the Associated Press." This was a cover for his main job, working for The Clayton Knight Committee. Bishop spent most of 1940 in London with Winston Churchill, which meant Knight had to set up office and find new partners during this time. Their original headquarters was in the Waldorf-Astoria Hotel in New York. It eventually expanded to Spokane, San Francisco, Los Angeles, Dallas, Kansas City, Cleveland, Atlanta, Memphis, and San Antonio.

=== Later years ===
The Clayton Knight Committee was terminated in May 1942. Between 1943 and 1945, Knight was an official artist for the United States Army Air Forces in Alaska, the Aleutian Islands, and the Central Pacific. He worked also as an historian. His original artwork, personal diaries, and documents from the wars are held in the Air Force University Library and Historical Branch. Additionally, some of his papers are held by the University of Southern Mississippi's de Grummond Children's Literature Collection.

On July 10, 1946, he was made an Officer of the Order of the British Empire (OBE) for his service to England in World War I and World War II.

== Personal life ==
Knight's wife was Katherine Sturges Dodge, a fellow illustrator, artist, and designer. They had two sons, Clayton Joseph and Hilary Knight, who is the illustrator of the Eloise series of children's books.

Clayton Knight died on July 17, 1969, in Danbury, Connecticut.
