= Hilary Knight (illustrator) =

American writer and artist (born 1926)

- Born: November 1, 1926 (age 100); Hempstead, Long Island, New York, U.S.
- Education: Art Students League of New York; School of Interior Design
- Occupation: Illustrator
- Known for: Illustrator for the 1950s children's book series Eloise
- Parents: Clayton Knight (father); Katherine Sturges Dodge (mother)

Hilary Knight (born November 1, 1926) is an American writer and artist. He is the illustrator of more than 50 books and the author of nine books. Knight is best known as the illustrator and co-creator of Kay Thompson's Eloise (1955) and others in the Eloise series.

Knight has illustrated for a wide variety of clients, creating artwork for magazines, children's fashion advertisements, greeting cards, record albums as well as posters and music album covers for Broadway musicals, including Gypsy, Irene (1973), Half A Sixpence, Hallelujah Baby!, and No, No, Nanette (1971). He has over 100 U.S. copyrights for his illustration works.

== Early life and career ==
One of two sons of artist-writers Clayton Knight and Katherine Sturges Dodge, Hilary Knight was born on Long Island in Hempstead, on November 1, 1926. His father illustrated aviation books and his mother was a fashion and book illustrator. Living in Roslyn, New York, as a child, Knight was six years old when he moved to Manhattan with his family. He attended the City and Country School (class of 1940) for elementary and middle school and Friends Seminary for high school. Knight recalled:

As a child, I loved to look at a set of books that belonged to my mother. They were illustrated by Edmund Dulac in a romantic, wonderful, detailed manner. I know he has influenced my style.

After studying with George Grosz and Reginald Marsh at the Art Students League, Knight labored as a ship painter while serving in the U.S. Navy from 1944 to 1946. He then worked for one summer as an assistant designer at a theater in Ogunquit, Maine. Returning to New York, Knight studied at the School of Interior Design. He studied architectural drafting at Delahanty Institute. Knight painted murals in private homes and entered the field of magazine illustration, starting with Mademoiselle in 1952, followed by House & Garden, Gourmet, McCall's, and Woman's Home Companion. His work as a humorous illustrator was strongly influenced by the British cartoonist and satirist Ronald Searle.

== Books ==
In January 1954, Knight met Kay Thompson, who was a popular singer and actress at the time. He was creating the cartoons and illustrations for Mademoiselle and House & Garden. In 1955, Knight collaborated with Thompson to create the whimsical black, white, and pink look of Eloise. Knight says that the image of Eloise was based on a 1930s painting by his mother Katherine Sturges Dodge. The live CBS television adaptation on Playhouse 90 (1956) with Evelyn Rudie as Eloise received such negative reviews that Thompson vowed never to allow another film or TV adaptation.

Three book sequels followed: Eloise in Paris (1957), Eloise at Christmastime (1958) and Eloise in Moscow (1959). Thompson and Knight teamed to create another sequel, Eloise Takes a Bawth, working with children's book editor Ursula Nordstrom. That title was announced in the Harper Books for Boys and Girls fall 1964 catalog, but in the mid-1960s, Thompson removed the three Eloise sequels from print and did not allow Eloise Takes a Bawth to be published. Thompson was reported to have considered the books as for adults and was shocked to see the books in only the children's section of a bookstore. It was an action that deprived her collaborator of income for decades (a situation that changed with Thompson's death in 1998). In Salon, Amy Benfer speculated on Thompson's motives in "Will the real Eloise please stand up?" (June 1, 1999):

Kay Thompson got sick of us. Our initial admiration—a mass consumption of all things Eloise—was viewed as imitation and she did not consider it a form of flattery. Adults and children flooded the Plaza, all insisting that they were Eloise.... I think she became jealous. So does Hilary Knight, Thompson's illustrator and collaborator.

Eloise Takes a Bawth was finally published in 2002. The book was written by Thompson and Mart Crowley with illustrations by Knight. Knight recalled:

Kay and I were like parents to Eloise. We decided that we'd never make her older than six, and that we'd always keep the parents in the background. When you really study the book, you see that Eloise is somewhat wistful. And I guess my job now is to continue what Kay might have thought she was doing when she pulled the books in the first place—to protect Eloise.

For the first time in the history of the Eloise books, Knight illustrated as well wrote one of the books in the series, The 365 Days of Eloise.

Knight also illustrated three of the four Mrs. Piggle-Wiggle books written by Betty MacDonald. Other publications with Knight illustrations include Good Housekeeping and the children's magazine Cricket. In addition to creating children's picture books—among them, in collaboration with poet Margaret Fishback, A Child's Book of Natural History (1969), a revision and extension of A Child's Primer of Natural History by Oliver Herford—Knight has illustrated for other genres, such as Peg Bracken's The I Hate to Cook Book. The roll call of artists Knight admires includes Ludwig Bemelmans, Joseph Hirsch, Leo Lionni, Robert Vickrey, and Garth Williams.

Knight's 1964 book Where's Wallace?, featuring an orangutan that kept escaping from the zoo to visit different places such as a circus, museum, department store, beach, etc., and who had to be located in each of the books panoramic pictures, anticipated Where's Waldo? by more than 20 years.

In 1979, Knight illustrated The Algonquin Cat, written by Val Schaffneran, an illustrated story about a real cat that resided in the Algonquin Hotel in New York City. There have been numerous cats in the hotel over the years. This book was published by Delacorte Press and Eleanor Friede in 1980.

== Broadway ==
Knight began creating posters for Broadway shows in 1965. He was hired by Harry Rigby, the producer of Half a Sixpence. Rigby later revealed in an interview that he could never have made the musical without Knight. The shows produced by Rigby were No, No, Nannette, Good News, and I Love My Wife.

Shows Knight created the poster artwork for include: No, No, Nanette (1971), Good News (1974), Gypsy (1974), I Love My Wife (1977), Ain't Misbehavin' (1978), Whoopee! (1979), Mame (1983), Meet Me in St. Louis (1989), and Busker Alley (1995).

== Galleries ==
Over the decades, Knight maintained an apartment in midtown Manhattan, which also served as his studio and library. Here, he adds to his collection of books, sheet music, programs, and soundtrack and cast recordings. Knight is represented by two galleries—the Giraffics Gallery (East Hampton, New York) and Every Picture Tells a Story (Santa Monica, California).

== In other media ==
The 2015 HBO documentary It's Me, Hilary: The Man Who Drew Eloise, by Lena Dunham, chronicles Knight's work on Eloise, personal life, and his tumultuous relationship with Kay Thompson.

== Books written by Knight ==
Title	Year
Hilary Knight's Mother Goose	1962
A Christmas stocking story	1963
A Firefly in a Fir Tree	1963
Angels & Berries & Candy Canes	1963
Where's Wallace?	1964
Hilary Knight's Cinderella	1978
Hilary Knight's The twelve days of Christmas	1981
Hilary Knight's The Owl and the pussy-cat (based on the poem by Edward Lear)	1983

== Works ==
- The Wonderful World of Aunt Tuddy, 1958
- The Circus Is Coming, 1947
- Jeremiah Octopus (by Margaret Stone Zilboorg), 1962
- Angels and Berries and Candy Canes, 1963
- Christmas Stocking Story, 1963
- Firefly in a Fir Tree, 1963
- Christmas in a Nutshell Library, 1963
- The Night Before Christmas, 1963
- Where's Wallace?, 1964
- When I Have A Little Girl, 1965
- When I Have A Little Boy, 1967
- Matt's Mitt, 1976
- That Makes Me Mad, 1976
- Hilary Knight's Cinderella, 1978
- The Circus is Coming, 1978
- The Algonquin Cat, 1980
- The Twelve Days of Christmas, 1981
- The Owl and the Pussy-Cat (by Edward Lear), 1983
- Telephone Time: A First Book of Telephone Do's and Don't's, 1986
- The Best Little Monkeys in the World, 1987
- Side by Side: Poems To Read Together (verse compilation), 1988
- The Beauty and the Beast, 1990
- Sunday Morning, 1992
- Happy Birthday (verse compilation), 1993
- The Mrs. Piggle-Wiggle Treasury, 1995
- When I Have A Little Girl/When I Have A Little Boy, 2000
- Eloise Takes a Bawth, 2002
- A Christmas Stocking Story, 2003
- Eloise: The Absolutely Essential, 2005
- Hilary Knight: Drawn from Life, 2018
- Olive & Oliver: The Formative Years, 2019
