= Eloise (books) =

American children's book series by Kay Thompson

- Logo for the Eloise series of books
- Author: Kay Thompson
- Illustrator: Hilary Knight
- Language: English
- Genre: Humor
- Publisher: Simon & Schuster
- Publication date: 1955
- Publication place: United States

Eloise is a series of books written in the 1950s by Kay Thompson and illustrated by Hilary Knight. The series is known for its distinctive narrative voice and expressive illustrations, which set it apart from traditional literature. The series includes Eloise: A Book for Precocious Grown-ups (1955) and four sequels: Eloise in Paris (1957), Eloise at Christmastime (1958), Eloise in Moscow (1959), and Eloise Takes a Bawth (2002).

The book follows a young girl, Eloise, who lives in the Plaza Hotel in New York City with her nanny, her dog Weenie, and her turtle Skipperdee. The character was developed from Thompson's childhood imaginary friend and alter ego, with Liza Minnelli often being suggested as a possible model for the character. Eloise is portrayed as an energetic and unconventional child, and the books present her daily experiences through imaginative and extravagant scenarios.

== Background and creation ==
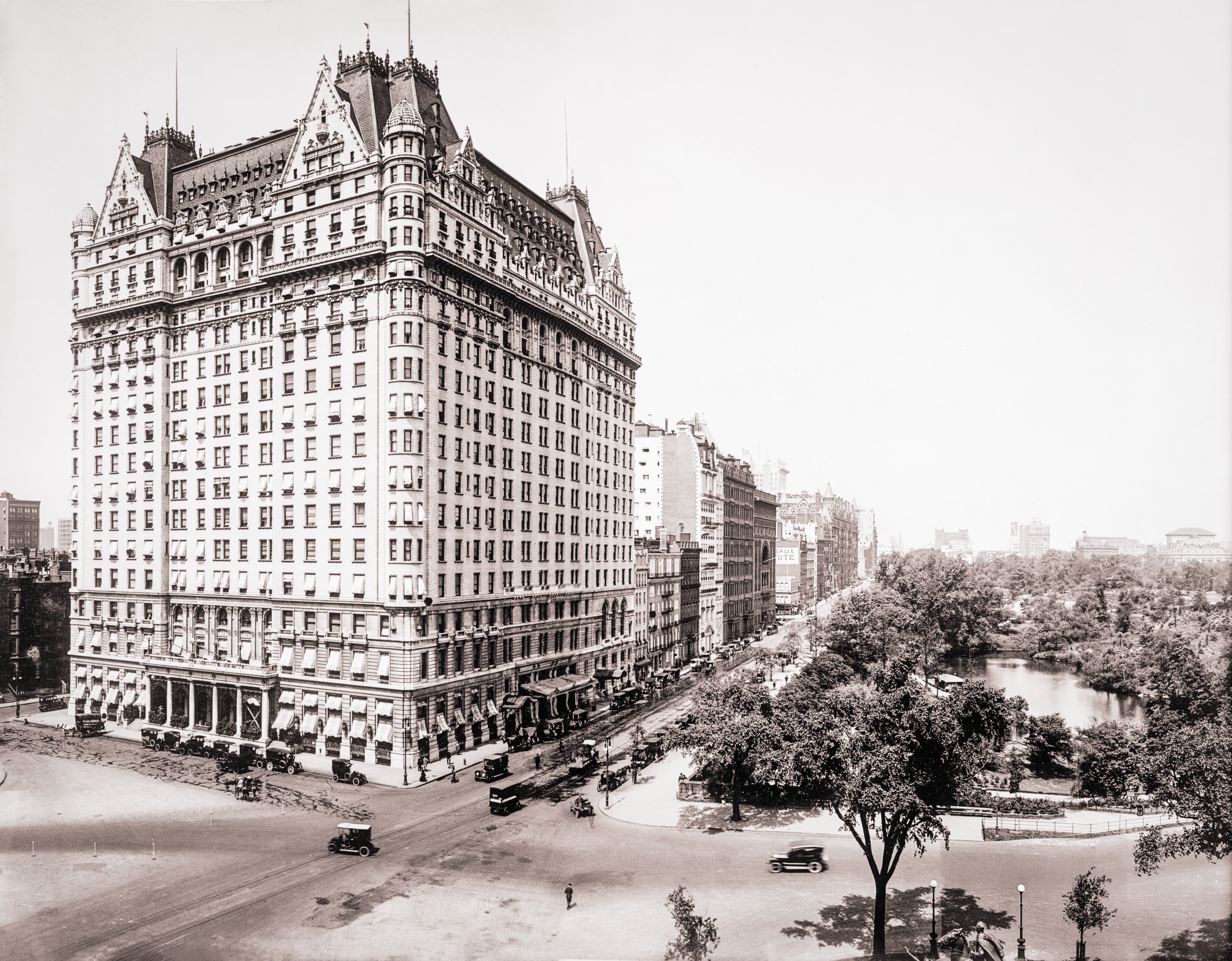
The Plaza Hotel, c. 1910

Kay Thompson began her career as a musician and performer, working in radio, film, and live entertainment. The character of Eloise was developed by Thompson from her imaginary alter ego, and possibly her goddaughter Liza Minnelli, who has often been speculated to be a model for the character. The idea for Eloise developed during Thompson's nightclub performances with Andy Williams and the Williams Brothers. Kay Thompson and future series illustrator, Hilary Knight, met through a mutual friend, and Knight offered to do drawings for Thompson's unseen story. Hilary Knight helped bring the character to life by translating Thompson's voice into a distinct illustrated form. The illustrator later stated that Eloise's image was based on a painting from the 1930s by his mother, Katherine Sturges Dodge. Early descriptions of Eloise began as a voice created by Thompson before fully developing into a visual character. Knight's illustrations brought Eloise to life visually and depicted the character mostly in pink. When Eloise was first published in 1955, it quickly became commercially successful, selling 150,000 copies within 2 years. The book's success led to international distribution and Thompson founding her own company, Eloise Ltd. She was able to produce recordings, make postcards, and other merchandise.

== Books ==
- Eloise: A Book for Precocious Grown-ups (1955)
- Eloise in Paris (1957)
- Eloise at Christmastime (1958)
- Eloise in Moscow (1959)
- Eloise Takes a Bawth (2002), posthumously published

The first three sequels — Eloise in Paris, Eloise at Christmastime, and Eloise in Moscow — were withdrawn from publication by Thompson in the mid-'60s, as she felt that they were not as perfect as the original Eloise. After Thompson died in 1998, her estate allowed Simon and Schuster to bring the books back into print. Eloise in Paris and Eloise at Christmastime were reissued to introduce the series to new readers.

Simon and Schuster released later tiles including Eloise's Guide to Life (2000), Eloise at Christmas (2003), Eloise's What I Absolutely Love Love Love (2005) and Love & Kisses, Eloise (2005). The same publisher began producing Eloise stories "in the style of Kay Thompson and Hilary Knight" to their early-reader Ready-to-Reads line in 2005. By 2007, 11 titles had been released in that line. Simon and Schuster also released a 60th anniversary edition of Eloise, which included the original text and additional background material. The edition featured a companion scrapbook and contributions from illustrator Hilary Knight.

Bernadette Peters narrates a collection of four Eloise stories — "Eloise", "Eloise in Paris", "Eloise at Christmastime", and "Eloise in Moscow", released by Simon & Schuster Audio in October 2015. These releases were part of broader efforts to expand the series through new formats, including audio editions. They are available in audio formats.

== Character and personality ==
Eloise is portrayed as a highly active child who spends her days moving through the Plaza Hotel and engaging in constant activity. Eloise is shown doing unusual and exaggerated actions, such as ordering small or unexpected items from room service. The narrative follows Eloise's daily experiences, presenting events as they occur throughout her day. The books include imaginative elements, such as interactions with animals and playful scenarios within the hotel, such as creating elevator jams. The illustrations include visual jokes and details that add to the storytelling. Eloise has been described as a “force of nature," characterized as brazen, ill-mannered, and appealing.

== Reception ==
Coverage from TIME Magazine highlights the strong anticipation surrounding Eloise Takes a Bawth, which was released decades after being written in the 1960s. Fans had long been aware of the book's existence and eagerly awaited its publication, prompting Simon and Schuster to print 200,000 copies in anticipation of high demand. Simon and Schuster ended up having huge success with the original book, selling over 2 million copies.

Reviews of later books in the series, including Eloise Takes a Bawth, highlight the books’ continued appeal and anticipation from the readers. A review from Kirkus Reviews describes Eloise Takes a Bawth as a lively and imaginative addition to the Eloise series. The review highlights Eloise's chaotic bathtub adventure, which floods the Plaza Hotel and transforms into a whimsical journey involving pirates and underwater scenes. It commends Hilary Knight for bringing the story to life through detailed illustrations. Overall, the review emphasized the book's humor, visual creativity, and re-read value, portraying Eloise at her most extravagant and entertaining.

A 2020 review by BlackRaven on Cannonball Read critiques Eloise: A Book for Precocious Grown Ups. It characterizes Eloise as spoiled, rude, and lacking redeeming qualities. The reviewer argues that the book appears to glorify misbehavior and questions its long-standing popularity and appeal to children and adults. Although the review briefly acknowledges how Hilary Knight showed Eloise in a way that did not follow typical or expected appearances, BlackRaven ultimately dismissed both the character and story as unappealing and difficult to understand.

On the other hand, a parenting blog review, Raising Readers, offers a generally positive view of Eloise, noting its appeal to children who enjoy mischievous activity. The review highlights the book's energetic, stream-of-consciousness narrative style. While their children enjoyed the humor and chaos of Eloise's behavior, the reviewer points out that elements such as limited parental supervision and dated cultural references, particularly in Eloise in Moscow, may make it feel less relatable to modern audiences.

== Adaptations ==
In 2003, Walt Disney Television produced two films based on the first books, titled Eloise at the Plaza and Eloise at Christmastime, starring Sofia Vassilieva as Eloise and Julie Andrews as Nanny. In 2006, an animated television series premiered on Starz! Kids & Family, with Mary Maitlyn Mouser and Lynn Redgrave in lead roles.

A direct-to-DVD animated feature entitled Eloise in Africa was announced in February 2009 but was never finished.

A film based on Eloise in Paris, starring Jordana Beatty as the title character and Uma Thurman as Nanny, was being developed by Charles Shyer, but development stalled. By 2020, the film re-entered development at MRC Film, with new writers and producers attached. In August 2025, it was reported that a film version written by Amy Sherman-Palladino was being cast for the main role. In November 2025, newcomer Mae Schenk was cast in the lead role, while Ryan Reynolds is set to portray an antagonist. Sherman-Palladino is set to direct, with the film to be released by Netflix.

Television

- Playhouse 90, "Eloise" (broadcast on November 22, 1956)
- Eloise: The Animated Series (broadcast from October 8 to November 12, 2006)

Films

- Eloise at the Plaza (2003)
- Eloise at Christmastime (2003)
- Eloise in Paris (cancelled)
- Eloise in Africa (cancelled)
- Eloise (TBA)

== Legacy ==
A portrait of Eloise hangs in the lobby of the Plaza Hotel. They also have a room at the Plaza called The Eloise Suite, which is a permanent themed suite decorated in pink and designed to reflect the character's style. The suite has become one of the hotel's most popular attractions, highlighting the character's lasting cultural and commercial appeal.

Filmmaker Lena Dunham cited Eloise as a major influence from childhood, reflecting the character's lasting cultural impact. Her connection to the series led her to produce the HBO documentary It's Me, Hilary, about illustrator Hilary Knight and the creation of Eloise.

Eloise has been featured in museum exhibitions, including “It's Me, Eloise” at the Eric Carle Museum of Picture Book Art, highlighting its cultural and artistic significance.

The series has expanded beyond books into merchandise and commercial products, including posters, collectibles, and branded items. The series has also appeared in popular culture, including references in films such as You've Got Mail and an episode in the HBO original series The Sopranos. The brand has extended into retail collaborations and cosmetics, including a bright pink, summer lipstick created by LORAC Cosmetics, reflecting Eloise's recognizable style and branding, as well as a mobile game for Android and iOS platforms based on the series.
