= Kay Thompson =

American author, singer, dancer, actress, and choreographer (1909–1998)

- Born: Catherine Louise Fink; November 9, 1909; St. Louis, Missouri, U.S.
- Died: July 2, 1998 (aged 88); New York City, U.S.
- Occupations: Author; composer; musician; actress; singer
- Works: Eloise book series
- Spouses: Jack Jenney (m. 1937; div. 1939) William Spier (m. 1942; div. 1947)

Hilary Knight's 1996 portrait of Kay Thompson for Vanity Fair

Kay Thompson (born Catherine Louise Fink; November 9, 1909 – July 2, 1998) was an American author, singer, vocal arranger, vocal coach, composer, musician, dancer, actress, and choreographer. She became famous for creating the Eloise children's books and for her role in the film Funny Face.

== Early life and family ==
Thompson was born Catherine Louise Fink in St. Louis, Missouri, in 1909, the second of the four children of Leo George Fink, a Jewish, Austrian-born pawnbroker and jeweler, and his American-born wife, Harriet Adelaide "Hattie" Tetrick, a Christian.

Leo and Harriet were married November 29, 1905, in East St. Louis, St. Clair County, Illinois. Thompson's siblings were Blanche Margaret Hurd, George "Bud" Fink, Jr., and Marian Antoinette Doenges.

== Radio work ==
Thompson began her career in the 1930s as a singer and choral director for radio. Her first big break was as a regular singer on the Bing Crosby - Woodbury show Bing Crosby Entertains (CBS, 1933–34). This led to a regular spot on The Fred Waring - Ford Dealers Show (NBC, 1934–35). With conductor Lennie Hayton, Thompson co-founded The Lucky Strike Hit Parade (CBS, 1935), where she met (and later married) trombonist Jack Jenney.

Thompson and Her Rhythm Singers joined André Kostelanetz and His Orchestra for the hit series The Chesterfield Radio Program (CBS, 1936), followed by It's Chesterfield Time (CBS, 1937), for which Thompson and her large choir were teamed with Hal Kemp and His Orchestra.

For her motion picture debut, Thompson and her choir performed two songs in the Republic Pictures musical Manhattan Merry-Go-Round (1937). In 1939, she reunited with André Kostelanetz for Tune-Up Time (CBS), a show produced by radio legend William Spier (who later married Thompson in 1942).

On an installment of Tune-Up Time in April 1939, 16-year-old Judy Garland was a guest. Thompson first met and worked with Garland at this time, developing a close personal friendship and professional association that lasted the rest of Garland's life.

== Hollywood ==
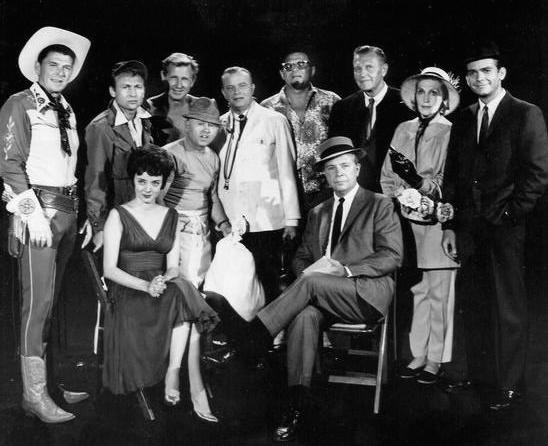
Guest stars for the 1961 premiere episode of The Dick Powell Show, "Who Killed Julie Greer?". Standing, from left: Ronald Reagan, Nick Adams, Lloyd Bridges, Mickey Rooney, Edgar Bergen, Jack Carson, Ralph Bellamy, Kay Thompson, Dean Jones. Seated, from left, Carolyn Jones and Dick Powell.

In 1943, Thompson signed an exclusive contract with MGM to become the studio's top vocal arranger, vocal coach, and choral director. She served as main vocal arranger for many of producer Arthur Freed's MGM musicals and as vocal coach to such stars as Judy Garland, Lena Horne, Frank Sinatra, and June Allyson. Some of the many MGM musicals for which Thompson was the vocal arranger include Ziegfeld Follies (1945), The Harvey Girls (1946), Till the Clouds Roll By (1946), Good News (1947), and The Pirate (1948).

As a film actress, Thompson only played one major role, that of fashion editor Maggie Prescott in the musical Funny Face (1957) for Paramount Pictures. Reunited with producer and songwriter Roger Edens and director Stanley Donen, her colleagues from MGM, Thompson garnered critical praise for her stylish turn as an editor based on real-life Harper's Bazaar editor Diana Vreeland, opening the film with her splashy "Think Pink!" and performing trios with Astaire and Hepburn.

In a December 6, 2006, interview on Turner Classic Movies, Donen said that Funny Face was made at Paramount with a primarily MGM crew, including Donen, Edens, and Thompson, because Paramount Pictures would not release Hepburn for any film except one made at Paramount. Thompson only acted in one additional feature film, 1970's Tell Me That You Love Me, Junie Moon, because, according to its star Liza Minnelli, Thompson disliked the slow speed of movie production.

== Nightclub act ==
Thompson left MGM in 1947 after working on The Pirate to create the nightclub act "Kay Thompson and the Williams Brothers", with the four Williams men as her backup singers and dancers. They made their debut in Las Vegas in 1947 and became an overnight sensation. Within a year, they were the highest-paid nightclub act in the world, breaking records wherever they appeared. She wrote the songs, and Robert Alton did the original choreography for the act.

== Eloise ==
Thompson, who lived at the Plaza Hotel in New York City, became most notable as the author of the Eloise series of children's books. The Eloise character was developed by the author based on her childhood imaginary friend and alter ego, with a voice in which Thompson spoke throughout her life, according to her biographer, filmmaker Sam Irvin. Thompson's goddaughter, Liza Minnelli, was often speculated as a possible model for Eloise.

The four books in the series, each illustrated by Hilary Knight, are Eloise (Simon & Schuster, 1955), Eloise in Paris (Simon & Schuster, 1957), Eloise at Christmastime (Random House, 1958), and Eloise in Moscow (Simon & Schuster, 1959). They follow the adventures of a precocious six-year-old girl who lives at the Plaza. All were bestsellers upon release and have been adapted into television projects. Thompson composed and performed a top-40 hit song, "Eloise" (Cadence Records, 1956).

A fifth book, Eloise Takes a Bawth, was posthumously published by Simon & Schuster in 2002, culled from Thompson's original manuscripts once slated for 1964 publication by Harper & Row. By 1964, though, Thompson was burned out on Eloise; she blocked publication and took all but the first book out of print.

== Recordings ==
As a singer, Thompson made very few records, starting with one side, "Take a Number from One to Ten", on a 1934 session by the Tom Coakley band. In 1935, she recorded four sides for Brunswick ("You Hit the Spot", "You Let Me Down", "Don't Mention Love to Me", and "Out of Sight, Out of Mind"), and another four sides for Victor. The four Brunswick sides are famous examples of mid-1930s sophisticated New York cabaret singing. She later recorded for Capitol, Columbia, Decca, and most importantly, MGM Records, which issued her only complete album of songs, in 1954. In February 1956, Thompson wrote and recorded the song "Eloise" at Cadence Records with an orchestra conducted by Archie Bleyer. The song debuted on March 10 of the same year, and became a top-40 hit, selling over 100,000 copies.

Throughout the 1950s and early 1960s, Thompson mentored the solo career of the young Andy Williams. She helped land him a regular singing spot on NBC-TV's new late-night series, The Tonight Show, hosted by Steve Allen. She got her friend Archie Bleyer to add Williams to the roster of artists on his label Cadence Records, where she wrote many of the songs he recorded, including the 1958 top-20 hit "Promise Me, Love". In 1963, Thompson paired the Christmas song "Holiday Season" – a song she had written and first performed in 1945 – with the 1942 Irving Berlin Christmas song "Happy Holiday", and gave it to Williams to sing. This medley arrangement and recording became a popular hit and has since been covered by many artists. Although it had been denied for decades, Williams admitted in his 2009 memoir, Moon River and Me (Viking Press), that Thompson and he had been secret lovers for several years, despite the 19-year age gap between them.

Thompson later recorded a spoken-word album for Signature Records, Let's Talk About Russia, which detailed her adventures in Moscow. Signature released a single of two songs by Thompson, "Dasvidanya" and "Moscow Cha Cha". She served as an adviser to Patti Page's 1957 television series, The Big Record.

Thompson kept busy with nightclub and television performances, as well as overseeing her successful Eloise franchise. She returned to live in New York City in 1969. Immediately following the death of Judy Garland in 1969, Thompson appeared with goddaughter Liza Minnelli in Tell Me That You Love Me, Junie Moon (1970). In 1974, Thompson directed a fashion show at the Palace of Versailles, featuring a performance by Minnelli and the collections of Halston, Bill Blass, Oscar de la Renta, and Anne Klein.

== Death ==
Thompson eventually moved into Minnelli's Upper East Side penthouse. On July 2, 1998, she was found unconscious in bed and rushed to Lenox Hill Hospital, where she was officially pronounced dead, aged 88.

== Personal life ==
Thompson was married twice:

- Jack Jenney, trombonist and bandleader, married 1937, divorced 1939
- William Spier, radio producer, married 1942, divorced 1947

After her second marriage failed, Thompson began a secret affair with Andy Williams (who was half her age) from 1947 to 1961. In December 1961, Williams married Claudine Longet. Thompson moved to Rome and never remarried.

== Legacy ==
- The original soundtrack to Funny Face has been remastered and reissued as an expanded 60th-anniversary edition, with eight alternate tracks, including four featuring Thompson. Most of her work for MGM has been preserved and released on Rhino/Turner Classic Movies original soundtrack series, including little-known contributions she did for films such as Meet the People (1944) and Abbott and Costello in Hollywood (1945). Her 1930s recordings are available on the CD Kay Thompson: Queen of Swing Vocal and Her Rhythm Singers (Baldwin Street Records), produced and annotated by Ted Ono. The rest of her recording career is compiled on the three-CD box set Think Pink! A Kay Thompson Party (Sepia Records), produced and annotated by Thompson biographer Sam Irvin.
- In 2003, Thompson was posthumously inducted into the St. Louis Walk of Fame.
- Minnelli recreated Thompson's nightclub act for her 2009 Tony Award-winning Broadway event, Liza's at the Palace. A CD cast recording, a PBS television special, and a DVD followed. Liza's at the Palace opened at New York's Palace theater, an affectionate salute to Thompson, her godmother. Supported by a quartet of singer-dancers standing in for the original Williams Brothers, Minnelli performed songs (with the original vocal arrangements) from Thompson's act, including "Clap Yo' Hands" and "Hello, Hello".
- An exhaustively researched list of all of Thompson's hundreds of credits for radio, TV, films, stage, books, and music is at the "Kayographies" tab at the Kay Thompson website. Featuring over 300 pages of endnotes, sidebars, letters, credits, etc., the website includes exclusive comprehensive extras about Thompson, which, due to space considerations, could not be included in Kay Thompson: From Funny Face to Eloise by Sam Irvin (published by Simon & Schuster).
- Thompson's sister Blanche Hurd was designated as her literary heir and was the commanding interest in the Eloise franchise beginning in 1998. After Hurd's death in 2002, the estate passed to Hurd's two children, Julie Hurd Szende and John Hurd.

== Filmography ==
- I Dood It (1943) (as Nightclub Patron) (uncredited)
- Lost in a Harem (1944) (as Singer) (uncredited)
- Broadway Rhythm (1944) (vocal arranger)
- Two Girls and a Sailor (1944) (vocal arranger)
- Meet the People (1944) (vocal arranger)
- Meet Me in St. Louis (1944) (vocal arranger) (uncredited)
- Weekend at the Waldorf (1945) (choral arrangements)
- Thrill of a Romance (1945) (as Hotel Guest) (uncredited)
- Ziegfeld Follies (1945) (writer: A Great Lady Has an Interview)
- Till the Clouds Roll By (1946) (vocal arranger/as Audience Member) (uncredited)
- No Leave, No Love (1946) (vocal arranger/as Glamorous Woman) (uncredited)
- The Kid from Brooklyn (1946)
- The Harvey Girls (1946) (as vocal arranger)
- Good News (1947) (vocal arranger/as Matron)
- The Pirate (1948) (as vocal arranger)
- Lady Possessed (1952) (as Nurse)
- Funny Face (1957) (as Maggie Prescott)
- Tell Me That You Love Me, Junie Moon (1970) (as Gregory)
