= List of Saturday Night Live short films =

Throughout Saturday Night Live's history, the show has featured short films from a wide range of comedy filmmakers, both unknown and revered. Filmmakers like Albert Brooks, Christopher Guest, and Adam McKay had regular slots to make shorts on the show before they became successful feature directors. Famed filmmakers like Robert Altman, Paul Thomas Anderson, and Noah Baumbach have swooped in to direct one-offs for the show after establishing themselves already in Hollywood. The show has also featured animated shorts from the likes of Robert Smigel and Mike Judge. Many feature films have developed from shorts that aired on SNL, including Office Space, A Mighty Wind, Bob Roberts, and Harold. The short film slot eventually evolved into the SNL Digital Short slot on the show, when Andy Samberg, Akiva Schaffer, and Jorma Taccone arrived at the show in 2005.

== History ==
=== Origins ===
In 1974, when Lorne Michaels and Dick Ebersol were developing Saturday Night Live, they asked comedian Albert Brooks to be the permanent host. He turned the job down and instead suggested he make short films for the show, having recently made his first show, called "Albert Brooks' Famous School For Comedians." They agreed, and Brooks was the first person hired to SNL, agreeing to write and direct a new short film for the show every week. Penelope Spheeris produced and served as a director of photography on Brooks's short films, and Monica Johnson and Harry Shearer collaborated with Brooks on most of them. Michaels wanted the films to be three minutes, Brooks wanted them to be five, so they came to an agreement that they would be three-to-five minutes. For the third episode, which was hosted by his friend Rob Reiner, Brooks submitted a 13-minute short, which Michaels refused to air until Reiner insisted that it be shown. The film was so long that it necessitated a commercial break in the middle, thus taking the audience away from the live show for 20 minutes. Michaels and Brooks continued to have conflict over the length of the films, and Brooks felt his films were resented by the SNL team and felt distant from them, being the only person working on the show living in LA. He left SNL with bitterness in early 1976. Spheeris tried pitching scripts for her own short films to Michaels, but he turned her down.

Michaels's friend Gary Weis, who had worked with him on a series of Lily Tomlin specials, replaced Brooks as the show's official filmmaker. His short films varied wildly from Brooks's, they were often documentaries and mood pieces. Also in 1976, the show put out a series of calls for "home movies" during the show, asking viewers to send comedy videos for no compensation. These segments aired on the show, labeled "home movies." Walter Williams sent in a Claymation video called "Mr. Bill", which became a wildly popular segment, running on the show through 1981 and spinning off a TV movie and a series of videos.

Starting with the third season, SNL writer Tom Schiller gradually took over the title of house filmmaker from Weis, who had become busy in Los Angeles making features. Schiller's short films, which aired under the titles "Schiller's Reel" and "Schillervision," were often cinematic parodies. His most famous pieces were "La Dolce Gilda," a La Dolce Vita parody starring Gilda Radner, and "Don't Look Back In Anger," which ironically starred John Belushi as an elderly version of himself and the last living SNL cast member visiting and dancing on the rest of the cast's graves. Schiller left the show along with the original cast and writers at the end of the fifth season.

=== 1980s ===
When Jean Doumanian took over the show in the 1980–81 season, she hired Mitchell Kriegman to the resident filmmaker position, only to fire him after five shows. Doumanian also began licensing short films and music videos from different directors that were not made for the show, airing them under the label "Shorts Shots." Taxi star Andy Kaufman pitched Doumanian on making a weekly short film for the show in 1980, and she turned him down. In 1981, Dick Ebersol assumed showrunner duties and commissioned one last "Mr. Bill" short and a series Andy Warhol written, directed by, and starring Andy Warhol called "Andy Warhol's T.V." Following that, Ebersol put out another call for "home movies." A few aired before he began to play short films on the show less frequently.

When Christopher Guest arrived in the 1984-1985 season, he wrote and directed a series of shorts, as well as voicing the title character in Jack Zander's animated series "Tippi Turtle."

Lorne Michaels returned to the show in the 1985-86 season. There were no short films that season because Michaels told the press that he intended to center the show more on live rather than pretaped material after the previous season's abundance of live and animated films. In the following season, he hired his old friend, British filmmaker John Head, to be in charge of film acquisitions on the show. Head served in this position for two seasons,Sam Kinison/Lou Reed. Saturday Night Live. 15 Nov 1986. NBC. seeking out and obtaining the rights to short films that were made independently of the show from directors like Ben Stiller, Tim Robbins, and Douglas McGrath. Tom Schiller returned to the show as resident filmmaker in the 1988 season, making a new batch of "Schiller's Reel" videos featuring the cast. In 1993, he began segment directing regular segments for the show written by others instead of his own "Schiller's Reel" pieces, and he departed the show in 1995 amidst another mass overhaul of the cast and crew.

=== 1990s ===
In 1993, cast member David Spade introduced Michaels to Beavis and Butt-head creator Mike Judge. Michaels commissioned Judge to make a series of shorts for the show. He wrote, directed, and voiced three animated shorts about a put-upon office drone named Milton, which eventually became the movie Office Space. After Kids in the Hall ended, Bruce McCulloch served as SNL's resident filmmaker for the 1994-95 season, getting two films to air before departing.

In 1996, writer Robert Smigel returned to the show to make a weekly cartoon for the show in the series "TV Funhouse." Notable "TV Funhouse" segments include "The Ambiguously Gay Duo," "Fun with Real Audio," and "The X-Presidents." "TV Funhouse" was adapted into a short-lived Comedy Central show in 2000, and the series of shorts ran regularly on SNL from 1996 to 2007 until they were discontinued due to budget cuts.

When Adam McKay stepped down as head writer in 1999, he pitched Lorne Michaels on letting him make short films for the show. He was given a budget to make a series of films that featured the cast and actors like Ben Stiller and Steve Buscemi. For the films in his first season, he shot on 16mm film, but for his second season, he shot them on digital, making the first SNL digital shorts.

=== 2000s ===
In 2000, a pre-Jackass Johnny Knoxville was offered a regular slot to make videos on the show after SNL producers saw his "Self Defense" video made for the skateboarding magazine Big Brother. Knoxville turned the opportunity down in order ot focus on getting the Jackass MTV show on the air.

When the sketch group The Lonely Island, consisting of Andy Samberg, Jorma Taccone, and Akiva Schaffer joined SNL in the 2005-06 season, they began writing and directing short films labeled "SNL Digital Short." They had a massive breakout hit with their second video, "Lazy Sunday," and the shorts became a regular part of the show for the rest of Samberg's tenure as a cast member. Notable Digital Shorts, include "Dick in a Box," "I'm On A Boat," "Natalie's Rap," the "Laser Cats" series, and "Jizz In My Pants."

=== 2010s-Present ===
Although Andy Samberg was contractually bound to the show through 2012 per the show's seven-year agreements for cast members, Jorma Taccone and Akiva Schaffer left SNL to direct feature films in 2010 and 2011, respectively. Taccone and Schaffer would return occasionally to collaborate on new digital shorts with Samberg, but in their absence, Samberg would regularly star in new digital shorts co-written by him and some of the show's writers and directed by the show's in-house segment directors like Jonathan Krisel and Jake Szymanski.

Following Samberg's departure, The Lonely Island has returned sporadically over the years to make new Digital Shorts, most recently for the show's 50th anniversary in 2025.

The 2012-2013 season did not feature a resident filmmaker, but Kyle Mooney, Beck Bennett, and Dave McCary, members of the sketch group Good Neighbor took the slot the following season, with Mooney and Bennett joining the cast and McCary becoming a staff writer and segment director. The three would frequently co-write short films for the show that were directed by McCary through 2018, at which point McCary left the show to make features, leaving Bennett and Mooney to occasionally write and star in their own films that were directed by the show's segment directors.

SNL writers Mike O'Brien, Julio Torres, Please Don't Destroy, and Dan Bulla each had runs in the show's short film slot, making videos that they wrote and/or starred in, often with a special title card crediting them, but none of them directed any of these films. Their digital shorts are always directed by the show's segment directors. Since McCary's departure, the show didn't have a resident writer/director until Martin Herlihy began writing and directing his own short films at the start of the 2025-26 season.

== List of short films ==
The following is a list of short films that aired on SNL, organized by the date in which they first aired.

Filmmaker	Series	Film Title	Original airdate	Notes
Albert Brooks	A Film by Albert Brooks	"The Impossible Truth"	10/11/75	
Gary Weis	A Film by Gary Weis	"Show Us Your Guns"	10/11/75	
Albert Brooks	A Film by Albert Brooks	"Parent's Home Video"	10/18/75	
Albert Brooks	A Film by Albert Brooks	"Operation"	10/25/75	
Albert Brooks	A Film by Albert Brooks	"Super Season"	11/8/75	
Albert Brooks	A Film by Albert Brooks	"Sick in Bed"	12/13/75	
Gary Weis	A Film by Gary Weis	"Homeward Bound"	12/20/75	
Albert Brooks	A Film by Albert Brooks	"Audience Research"	1/10/76	
Gary Weis	A Film by Gary Weis	"Play Misty For Me"	1/10/76	
Gary Weis	A Film by Gary Weis	"Who's Funny?"	1/17/76	
Gary Weis	A Film by Gary Weis	"The Paramount Novelty Store"	1/24/76	
Gary Weis	A Film by Gary Weis	"Clothing Designer & Plastic Surgeon"	1/31/76	
Harry McDevitt	Home Movie	"The Applie Follies"	1/31/76	
Gary Weis	A Film by Gary Weis	"Pledge Allegiance"	2/14/76	
Howard Grunwald	Home Movie	"A Home Movie"	2/14/76	
Gary Weis	A Film by Gary Weis	"Pet Talk with Taylor Mead"	2/21/76	
Gary Weis	A Film by Gary Weis	"Wegman"	2/28/76	
Walter Williams	The Mr. Bill Show	"The Mr. Bill Show"	2/28/76	
Gary Weis	A Film by Gary Weis	"Cats & Dogs"	3/13/76	
Phil Van De Carr	Home Movie	"P-Nut Fever"	3/13/76	
Gary Weis	A Film by Gary Weis	"Garbage"	4/17/76	
David Massar	Home Movie	"Men's Room Urinal"	4/17/76	
Gary Weis	A Film by Gary Weis	"Raquel"	4/24/76	
Gary Weis	A Film by Gary Weis	"No Reason to Leave New York"	5/8/76	
Gary Weis	A Film by Gary Weis	"Niagara Falls"	5/15/76	
Gary Weis	A Film by Gary Weis	"Toilet Seats"	5/22/76	
Gary Weis	A Film by Gary Weis	"Uncle Charlie's School"	5/29/76	
Gary Weis	A Film by Gary Weis	"Taylor Mead"	9/18/76	
Gary Weis	A Film by Gary Weis	"Sight Gag"	9/25/76	
John Brister	Home Movie	"Spanish Peanuts"	9/25/76	
Eric Idle		"The Rutles"	10/2/76	
Walter Williams	The Mr. Bill Show	"Mr. Bill Goes to a Party"	10/16/76	
Gary Weis	A Film by Gary Weis	"Pips"	10/16/76	
Gary Weis	A Film by Gary Weis	"Autumn in New York"	10/23/76	
Gary Weis	A Film by Gary Weis	"It's Halloween Tonight"	10/30/76	
Eric Idle		"Crackerbox Palace"	11/20/76	
Gary Weis	A Film by Gary Weis	"Kids' Dreams"	11/27/76	
Gary Weis	A Film by Gary Weis	"Diana Nyad"	12/11/76	
Gary Weis	A Film by Gary Weis	"Night Moves	1/22/77	
Walter Williams	The Mr. Bill Show	"Mr. Bill Goes to a Magic Show"	1/22/77	
Gary Weis	A Film by Gary Weis	"Small Worlds"	1/29/77	
Gary Weis	A Film by Gary Weis	"Cemeteries"	2/20/77	
Gary Weis	A Film by Gary Weis	"Gary Weis Down South"	2/20/77	
Gary Weis	A Film by Gary Weis	"New Orleans Soul Food Restaurant"	2/26/77	
Gary Weis	A Film by Gary Weis	"Baton"	3/12/77	
Robert Altman		"Sissy's Roles"	3/12/77	
Gary Weis	A Film by Gary Weis	"Broderick's Old Neighborhood"	3/19/77	
Gary Weis	A Film by Gary Weis	"Rocky"	3/26/77	
Gary Weis	A Film by Gary Weis	"Patti Smith"	4/9/77	
Gary Weis	A Film by Gary Weis	"Sport Violence"	4/16/77	
Gary Weis	A Film by Gary Weis	"Body Language"	4/23/77	
William Wegman		"Dog in Bed"	5/21/77	
Gary Weis	A Film by Gary Weis	"Autumn in New York"	10/8/77	
Tom Schiller	Schiller's Reel	"The Acid Generation: Where Are They Now?"	10/8/77	
Tom Schiller	Schiller's Reel	"Life After Death"	11/19/77	
Gary Weis	A Film by Gary Weis	"Hollywood Homes"	1/21/78	
Gary Weis	A Film by Gary Weis	"The Voice"	2/18/78	
Tom Schiller	Schiller's Reel	"Don't Look Back In Anger"	3/11/78	
Gary Weis	A Film by Gary Weis	"Cold As Ice"	3/25/78	
Walter Williams	The Mr. Bill Show	"Mr. Bill's Circus"	3/25/78	
Walter Williams	The Mr. Bill Show	"Mr. Bill Pays Taxes"	4/8/78	
Tom Schiller	Schiller's Reel	La Dolce Gilda	4/15/78	
Gary Weis	A Film by Gary Weis	"Swan Lake Ballet"	4/22/78	
Tom Schiller	Schiller's Reel	"Sushi By The Pool"	10/7/78	
Walter Williams	The Mr. Bill Show	"Mr. Bill Goes To New York"	10/14/78	
Walter Williams	The Mr. Bill Show	"Mr. Bill Moves In	10/21/78	
Walter Williams	The Mr. Bill Show	"Mr. Bill Goes Fishing"	11/18/78	
Tom Schiller	Schiller's Reel	"Roman Holiday"	11/18/78	
Walter Williams	The Mr. Bill Show	"Mr. Bill Is Late"	12/2/78	
Aviva Slesin		"The Canine Chorus"	12/9/78	
Walter Williams	The Mr. Bill Show	"Mr. Bill Goes To Court"	1/27/79	
Tom Schiller	Schiller's Reel	"Picasso: The New York Years"	2/17/79	
Walter Williams	The Mr. Bill Show	"Mr. Bill Shapes Up"	2/24/79	
Tom Schiller	Schiller's Reel	"Perchance To Dream"	3/10/79	
Walter Williams	The Mr. Bill Show	"Mr. Bill Is Hiding"	3/17/79	
Aviva Slesin		"A Bird For All Seasons"	4/7/79	
Walter Williams	The Mr. Bill Show	"Mr. Bill Runs Away"	5/12/79	
Walter Williams	The Mr. Bill Show	"Mr. Bill Goes to the Movies"	5/19/79	
Tom Schiller	Schiller's Reel	"Clones Exist Now"	5/26/79	
Walter Williams	The Mr. Bill Show	"The All New Mr. Bill Show"	10/13/79	
Walter Williams	The Mr. Bill Show	"Mr. Bill Stays Home"	11/3/79	
Walter Williams	The Mr. Bill Show	"Mr. Bill Builds a House"	11/17/79	
Aviva Slesin		"First Love"	12/8/79	
Aviva Slesin		"First Love II"	12/15/79	
Tom Schiller	Schiller's Reel	"Java Junkie"	12/22/79	Neal Marshad producer and cinematographer
Walter Williams	The Mr. Bill Show	"Mr. Bill Gets Help"	1/26/80	
Tom Schiller	Schiller's Reel	"Linden Palmer, Hollywood's Forgotten Director"	2/9/80	Neal Marshad producer and cinematographer
Tom Schiller	Schiller's Reel	"Mask of Fear"	2/23/80	
Walter Williams	The Mr. Bill Show	"Mr. Bill Strikes Back!"	4/5/80	
Andy Aaron		"Street Scene"	4/12/80	
Edie Baskin		"Food"	4/19/80	
Walter Williams	The Mr. Bill Show	"Mr. Bill Goes to Jail"	5/10/80	
Randal Kleiser	Short Shots	"Foot Fetish"	11/15/80	Not created for SNL originally. Made as a student film in 1973.
Mitchell Kriegman		"Heart to Heart"	11/15/80	
Jonathan Demme	Short Shots	"Gidget Goes to Hell"	11/15/80	Not created for SNL originally. Music video for the band Suburban Lawns that aired on the show.
Ken Friedman	Short Shots	"Showdown"	11/22/80	
Mitchell Kriegman		"Someone Is Hiding In My Apartment"	11/22/80	
Bill Paxton		"Fish Heads"	12/6/80	Not created for SNL originally, this is a music video for the novelty song "Fish Heads."
Leon Ichaso		"Pepe Gonzales"	12/6/80	
Martin Brest	Short Shots	"Hot Dogs for Gauguin"	12/13/80	Starring Danny DeVito and Rhea Perlman. Not created for SNL originally. This was Brest's 1972 student film.
Walter Williams	The Mr. Bill Show	"Mr. Bill's Christmas Special"	12/20/80	
Mitchell Kriegman		"Dancing Man"	12/20/80	
Michael Nesmith		"The Man with the Black Hat"	1/10/81	
William Dear		"The Foreign Film"	1/24/81	
Leon Ichaso		"Sweet Hearts"	2/14/81	
Yoko Ono		"Season of Glass"	10/3/81	
Andy Warhol	Andy Warhol's T.V.	"Andy Warhol's T.V."	10/3/81	
Andy Warhol	Andy Warhol's T.V.	"Andy Warhol's T.V."	10/10/81	
Walter Williams	The Mr. Bill Show	"Mr. Bill Goes to L.A."	10/17/81	
Andy Warhol	Andy Warhol's T.V.	"Andy Warhol's T.V."	10/31/81	
Tom Schiller	Schiller's Reel	"Art Is Ficial"	11/7/81	
William Wegman		"Man Ray and Mic"	11/14/81	
Timothy Hittle	Home Movie	"Fracas"	2/20/82	
Gary Snegaroff	Home Movie	"The Thing That Destroyed Tokyo"	2/20/82	
Timothy Hittle	Home Movie	"Jay Clay Gets Depressed"	4/17/82	
Elbert Budin		"Pumpkin"	10/30/82	
Ed Bianchi		"Babies In Makeup"	2/11/84	
Andy Breckman		"The Bulge"	10/6/84	
Christopher Guest		"Ballplayers"	10/13/84	
Jack Zander	Tippi Turtle	"Tippi Turtle"	10/13/84	
Jack Zander	Tippi Turtle	"Tippi Turtle"	10/20/84	
Christopher Guest		"The Folksmen"	11/3/84	
Jack Zander	Tippi Turtle	"Tippi Turtle"	11/17/84	
Christopher Guest		"Minkman Novelties"	11/17/84	
Andy Breckman		"White Like Me"	12/15/84	
Christopher Guest		"Lifestyles of the Relatives of the Rich & Famous"	12/15/84	
Christopher Guest		"Minkman's Dream"	2/9/85	
Christopher Guest		"Tony Minetti's Comeback"	4/13/85	
Andy Breckman		"Run, Throw & Catch Like A Girl Olympics"	4/13/85	
Steve Farrell		"Pango, Giant Dog Of Tokyo!"	11/8/86	
William Wegman		"Dog Baseball"	11/8/86	
Jim Jarmusch		"Coffee and Cigarettes"	11/22/86	Starring Steven Wright and Roberto Benigni; later adapted into Jarmusch's 2003 anthology feature film Coffee and Cigarettes
Tim Robbins		"Bob Roberts"	12/13/86	This short was developed into the 1992 feature film Bob Roberts
John Eskow		"The True Life Story of Frankie Toussaint"	12/20/86	Starring Griffin Dunne
Ben Stiller, Ralph Glenn Howard, and Steve Klayman		"The Hustler of Money"	3/28/87	A parody of The Color of Money starring Ben Stiller and John Mahoney; the debut of Stiller's Tom Cruise impression
Richard Goldstone		"Dave's Party"	5/9/87	
Lyndhall Hobbs		"Hollywood Mom"	5/16/87	
Trina Mitchum		"Out Of Gas"	11/14/87	Starring Robert Mitchum and Jane Greer
Douglas McGrath & Liz Welch		"Laurie Has a Story"	10/5/88	Starring Laurie Metcalf and Catherine O'Hara
Tom Schiller	Schiller's Reel	"Love Is A Dream"	12/17/88	Neal Marshad producer and cinematographer
Tom Schiller	Schiller's Reel	"Broadway Story"	3/25/89	"Broadway Story" was a four-part series that Schiller made, but only two installments aired before the show pulled the plug on them. The third installment was inserted in Comedy Central reruns of the fourteenth season episode hosted by Demi Moore.
Tom Schiller	Schiller's Reel	"Broadway Story II"	4/15/89	
Tom Schiller	Schiller's Reel	"Falling In Love"	10/28/89	Neal Marshad producer and cinematographer
Tom Schiller	Schiller's Reel	"Dieter In Space"	12/16/89	
Tom Schiller	Schiller's Reel	"Hooked On Sushi"	2/24/00	Neal Marshad producer and cinematographer
Tom Schiller	Schiller's Reel	"The Vision Of Van Gogh"	10/20/90	
Tom Schiller	Schiller's Reel	"Sudden Pressure"	11/17/90	
Tom Schiller	Schiller's Reel	"SchillerVision Theatre"	12/15/90	
Tom Schiller	Schiller's Reel	"Hidden Camera Commercials"	11/16/91	
Tom Schiller	Schiller's Reel	"Million Dollar Zombie"	3/21/92	
Tom Schiller	Schiller's Reel	"Dieter's Dream"	3/20/93	
Tom Schiller	Schiller's Reel	"While the City Sweeps"	4/17/93	
Tom Schiller	Schiller's Reel	"Criminal Encounter"	5/15/93	
Mike Judge	Office Space	"Office Space"	9/25/93	Mike Judge's "Office Space" series of shorts were developed into the feature film Office Space.
Tom Schiller	Schiller's Reel	"Will Work For Food"	11/13/93	
Mike Judge	Office Space	"Office Space"	3/19/94	
Mike Judge	Office Space	"Office Space"	10/22/94	
Bruce McCulloch	A Film by Bruce McCulloch	"Stalking"	12/17/94	
Bruce McCulloch	A Film by Bruce McCulloch	"Snowbird"	2/25/95	
Robert Smigel and Company	TV Funhouse	(102 segments)	9/28/96-3/1/08	
Mark Alt	Maakies	"Drinky Crow Gets a Job"	9/26/98	Written by Tony Millionaire based on his comic strip Maakies. SNL head writer Adam McKay saw Millionaire's comic strip and reached out to him to make cartoons based on it for the show. Six animated shorts were produced, but only two aired. Millionaire says other cartoons were produced for the show from other creators, but they were deemed "not funny enough" and never aired.
Mark Alt	Maakies	"Mermaid"	10/3/98	Written by Tony Millionaire based on his comic strip Maakies. SNL head writer Adam McKay saw Millionaire's comic strip and reached out to him to make cartoons based on it for the show. Six animated shorts were produced, but only two aired. Millionaire says other cartoons were produced for the show from other creators, but they were deemed "not funny enough" and never aired.
Adam McKay	A Short Film By Adam McKay	"The Heat Is On"	2/5/00	
Paul Thomas Anderson		"Fanatic"	2/19/00	
Adam McKay	A Short Film By Adam McKay	"Neil Armstrong: The Ohio Years"	3/11/00	
Adam McKay	A Short Film By Adam McKay	"Stavenhagens Pawn Shop"	4/15/00	
Adam McKay	A Short Film By Adam McKay	"The Pervert"	1/13/01	
Adam McKay	A Short Film By Adam McKay	"The Baby and the German Intellectual"	2/10/01	
Adam McKay	A Short Film By Adam McKay	"The Doberman!"	3/17/01	
T. Sean Shannon		"The Adventures of Harold"	5/15/04	This short evolved into the feature film Harold.
T. Sean Shannon	Bear City	"Bear City"	10/23/04	
T. Sean Shannon	Bear City	"Bear City"	10/23/04	
T. Sean Shannon	Bear City	"Bear City"	12/18/04	
T. Sean Shannon	Bear City	"Bear City"	2/5/05	
T. Sean Shannon	Bear City	"Bathroom Blues"	3/12/05	
T. Sean Shannon	Bear City	"Bear City"	5/7/05	
T. Sean Shannon	Bear City	"Bear City"	5/21/05	
The Lonely Island	SNL Digital Short	"Lettuce"	12/3/05	Written by Will Forte
The Lonely Island	SNL Digital Short	"Lazy Sunday"	12/17/05	NOTE: All Lonely Island SNL Digital Shorts are written by Andy Samberg, Akiva Schaffer, and Jorma Taccone, unless otherwise noted. All Lonely Island SNL Digital Shorts directed by Schaffer unless otherwise noted. Written by The Lonely Island and Chris Parnell
The Lonely Island	SNL Digital Short	"Young Chuck Norris"	1/21/06	Written by Harper Steele
The Lonely Island	SNL Digital Short	"Two Inches"	2/4/06	Written by Will Forte
The Lonely Island	SNL Digital Short	"The Tangent"	2/4/06	Written by Bill Hader
The Lonely Island	SNL Digital Short	"Natalie's Rap"	3/4/06	Written by The Lonely Island and Asa Taccone
The Lonely Island	SNL Digital Short	"Doppelganger"	3/11/06	
The Lonely Island	SNL Digital Short	"Laser Cats!"	4/15/06	Written by Andy Samberg and Bill Hader
The Lonely Island	SNL Digital Short	"My Testicles"	5/6/06	
The Lonely Island	SNL Digital Short	"Peyote"	5/13/06	Written by The Lonely Island and Will Forte
The Lonely Island	SNL Digital Short	"Andy Walking"	5/20/06	Written by Andy Samberg
The Lonely Island	SNL Digital Short	"Cubicle Fight"	9/30/06	Written by Bill Hader and John Lutz
The Lonely Island	SNL Digital Short	"Harpoon Man"	10/21/06	
The Lonely Island	SNL Digital Short	"Pep Talk"	12/9/06	Written by Fred Armisen and John Lutz
The Lonely Island	SNL Digital Short	"Dick in a Box"	12/16/06	
The Lonely Island	SNL Digital Short	"Laser Cats! 2"	1/13/07	Written by The Lonely Island and Bill Hader
The Lonely Island	SNL Digital Short	"Nurse Nancy"	1/20/07	Written by Matt Murray
The Lonely Island	SNL Digital Short	"Body Fuzion"	2/3/07	Written by Amy Poehler, Maya Rudolph, and Kristen Wiig
The Lonely Island	SNL Digital Short	"Andy Popping Into Frame"	2/10/07	
Jorma Taccone	SNL Digital Short	"Business Meeting"	2/24/07	Written by Jorma Taccone and Seth Meyers
The Lonely Island	SNL Digital Short	"Dear Sister"	4/14/07	
The Lonely Island	SNL Digital Short	"Roy Rules!"	4/21/07	Written by Andy Samberg and Jorma Taccone. Directed by Jorma Taccone
The Lonely Island	SNL Digital Short	"Talking Dog"	5/19/07	
The Lonely Island	SNL Digital Short	"People Getting Punched Right Before Eating"	10/13/07	Written by Andy Samberg
Akiva Schaffer	SNL Digital Short	"Brian Diaries"	11/3/07	Written by Akiva Schaffer and Brian Williams
The Lonely Island	SNL Digital Short	"Grandkids in the Movies"	2/23/08	Written by Andy Samberg, Akiva Schaffer, and Bill Hader
The Lonely Island	SNL Digital Short	"The Mirror"	3/1/08	Written by Andy Samberg and Akiva Schaffer
The Lonely Island	SNL Digital Short	"Hero Song"	3/8/08	Written by Andy Samberg and Akiva Schaffer
The Lonely Island	SNL Digital Short	"Andy's Dad"	3/15/08	Written by Andy Samberg, Akiva Schaffer, and Jonah Hill
The Lonely Island	SNL Digital Short	"Laser Cats! 3D"	4/5/08	Written by Andy Samberg and Akiva Schaffer
The Lonely Island	SNL Digital Short	"Daquiri Girl"	4/12/08	Written by Andy Samberg and Akiva Schaffer
Jason Reitman		"Death By Chocolate" (3 parts)	4/12/08	
The Lonely Island	SNL Digital Short	"Best Look in the World"	5/10/08	
The Lonely Island	SNL Digital Short	"Space Olympics"	9/13/08	
The Lonely Island	SNL Digital Short	"Hey! (Murray Hill)"	9/20/08	Written by Akiva Schaffer and Jorma Taccone
The Lonely Island	SNL Digital Short	"Extreme Activities Challenge"	10/4/08	
Noah Baumbach		"New York Underground"	10/18/08	Written by Baumbach, Fred Armisen, and Bill Hader
The Lonely Island	SNL Digital Short	"Jam the Vote"	10/23/08	
The Lonely Island	SNL Digital Short	"Ras Trent"	10/25/08	
The Lonely Island	SNL Digital Short	"Everyone's A Critic"	11/15/08	Directed by Akiva Schaffer and Jorma Taccone
Noah Baumbach		"Clearing the Air"	11/15/08	Written by Baumbach, Fred Armisen, and Bill Hader
The Lonely Island	SNL Digital Short	"Jizz in my Pants"	12/6/08	
The Lonely Island	SNL Digital Short	"Doogie Howser Theme"	1/10/09	Written by Akiva Schaffer and Jorma Taccone
The Lonely Island	SNL Digital Short	"A Couple of Homies"	1/17/09	Written by Andy Samberg, Akiva Schaffer, and Will Forte
The Lonely Island	SNL Digital Short	"Laser Cats! 4 Ever"	1/31/09	
The Lonely Island	SNL Digital Short	"I'm On A Boat"	2/7/09	
The Lonely Island	SNL Digital Short	"Property of the Queen"	2/14/09	
The Lonely Island	SNL Digital Short	"Party Guys"	3/14/09	Written by The Lonely Island and Bill Hader
The Lonely Island	SNL Digital Short	"Like A Boss"	4/4/09	
The Lonely Island	SNL Digital Short	"Motherlover"	5/9/09	Directed by Akiva Schaffer and Jorma Taccone
John Solomon	SNL Digital Short	"The Date"	9/26/09	Written by John Solomon and Will Forte
The Lonely Island	SNL Digital Short	"Megan's Roommate"	9/26/09	
The Lonely Island	SNL Digital Short	"Threw It On the Ground"	10/3/09	
Akiva Schaffer	SNL Digital Short	"Brenda & Shaun"	10/10/09	Written by Akiva Schaffer and Fred Armisen
Akiva Schaffer	SNL Digital Short	"Firelight	11/7/09	Written by Akiva Schaffer and Seth Meyers
The Lonely Island	SNL Digital Short	Get Out!	11/14/09	Written by Andy Samberg and Fred Armisen
The Lonely Island	SNL Digital Short	"Reba (Two Worlds Collide)"	11/21/09	
The Lonely Island	SNL Digital Short	"Shy Ronnie"	12/5/09	
The Lonely Island	SNL Digital Short	"The Tizzle Wizzle Show (Jammy Shuffle)"	12/19/09	
The Lonely Island	SNL Digital Short	"Boombox"	3/13/10	Written by The Lonely Island and Asa Taccone
The Lonely Island	SNL Digital Short	"The Other Man"	4/17/10	Written by The Lonely Island and John Mulaney
The Lonely Island	SNL Digital Short	"Cherry Battle"	4/24/10	Directed by Akiva Schaffer and Jorma Taccone
The Lonely Island	SNL Digital Short	"Golden Girls Theme"	5/8/10	Written by Andy Samberg and Akiva Schaffer. Directed by Akiva Schaffer and Jonathan Krisel
The Lonely Island	SNL Digital Short	"Great Day"	5/15/10	Directed by Akiva Schaffer and Jorma Taccone
The Lonely Island	SNL Digital Short	"Boogerman"	9/26/10	Written by Andy Samberg, Akiva Schaffer, and Jonathan Krisel. Directed by Akiva Schaffer and Jonathan Krisel
The Lonely Island	SNL Digital Short	"Rescue Dogs 3D App"	10/2/10	Written by Andy Samberg, Akiva Schaffer, and Jonathan Krisel. Directed by Akiva Schaffer and Jonathan Krisel
The Lonely Island	SNL Digital Short	"Relaxation Therapy"	10/9/10	Written by Andy Samberg, Akiva Schaffer, and Jonathan Krisel. Directed by Akiva Schaffer and Jonathan Krisel
The Lonely Island	SNL Digital Short	I Broke My Arm	10/23/10	Written by Andy Samberg, Akiva Schaffer, and Jonathan Krisel.
The Lonely Island	SNL Digital Short	"Shy Ronnie 2: Ronnie and Clyde"	10/30/10	Written by Akiva Schaffer and Andy Samberg
The Lonely Island	SNL Digital Short	"What Was That?"	11/13/10	
The Lonely Island	SNL Digital Short	"Party at Mr. Bernard's"	12/4/10	Written by Andy Samberg, Akiva Schaffer, and John Solomon
John Solomon	SNL Digital Short	"Stumblin'"	12/11/10	Written by Andy Samberg, John Solomon, and Mike O'Brien
The Lonely Island	SNL Digital Short	"I Just Had Sex"	12/18/10	
The Lonely Island	SNL Digital Short	"Andy and Pee-Wee's Night Out"	1/15/11	Written by Andy Samberg and John Solomon. Directed by Jorma Taccone and John Solomon
The Lonely Island	SNL Digital Short	"The Creep"	1/29/11	
The Lonely Island	SNL Digital Short	"Laser Cats 6: The Musical"	4/12/11	Directed by Akiva Schaffer and Jorma Taccone
The Lonely Island	SNL Digital Short	"Jack Sparrow"	5/7/11	
The Lonely Island	SNL Digital Short	"3-Way: The Golden Rule"	5/21/11	Directed by Akiva Schaffer and Jorma Taccone
The Lonely Island	SNL Digital Short	"Stomp"	10/1/11	Written by Andy Samberg and Jorma Taccone. Directed by Jorma Taccone
John Solomon	SNL Digital Short	"V-Necks"	10/8/11	Written by Andy Samberg and John Solomon
John Solomon	SNL Digital Short	"Drake Interview"	10/15/11	Written by Andy Samberg and John Solomon
The Lonely Island	SNL Digital Short	"Wish It Would Rain"	11/12/11	Directed by Jorma Taccone
John Solomon	SNL Digital Short	"Seducing Women Through Chess"	11/19/11	Written by Andy Samberg and John Solomon
John Solomon	SNL Digital Short	"Batman"	12/3/11	Written by Andy Samberg and John Solomon
The Lonely Island	SNL Digital Short	"Best Friends"	12/10/11	Written by Andy Samberg and Jorma Taccone. Directed by Jorma Taccone
The Lonely Island	SNL Digital Short	"Afros"	3/3/12	Written by Andy Samberg, Jorma Taccone, and John Solomon. Directed by Jorma Taccone and John Solomon
The Lonely Island	SNL Digital Short	"Laser Cats 7"	4/14/12	Written by Andy Samberg and Jorma Taccone. Directed by Jorma Taccone
The Lonely Island	SNL Digital Short	"100th Digital Short"	5/12/12	Directed by Akiva Schaffer and Jorma Taccone
The Lonely Island	SNL Digital Short	"Lazy Sunday 2"	5/19/12	Written by The Lonely Island and Chris Parnell. Directed by Jorma Taccone
The Lonely Island	SNL Digital Short	"Yolo"	1/26/13	
Good Neighbor		"Miley Sex Tape"	10/5/13	NOTE: All Good Neighbor shorts written by Beck Bennett, Kyle Mooney, and Dave McCary, and directed by McCary, unless otherwise noted.
Good Neighbor		"Beer Pong"	10/12/13	
Good Neighbor		"Ice Cream"	11/2/13	
Good Neighbor		"Dancing"	11/23/13	
Good Neighbor		"I Know"	1/18/14	
Good Neighbor		"Inside SoCal"	1/25/14	
Good Neighbor		"Kyle Interview"	2/1/14	
Good Neighbor		"Over Explainers"	3/8/14	
Good Neighbor		"Chris Fitzpatrick"	3/29/14	
Good Neighbor		"Flirty"	4/5/14	
Good Neighbor		"420"	4/12/14	
The Lonely Island	SNL Digital Short	"Hugs"	5/17/14	
Good Neighbor		"Bad Boys"	9/27/14	
Good Neighbor		"Poem"	10/4/14	
Good Neighbor		"Inside SoCal"	10/11/14	
Good Neighbor		"Robbers"	11/1/14	
The Lonely Island	SNL Digital Short	"That's When You Break"	2/15/15	Made for Saturday Night Live 40th Anniversary Special
Good Neighbor		"The Fight"	11/22/14	
Good Neighbor		"Mr. Riot Films"	2/28/15	
Good Neighbor		"Reality House"	3/7/15	
Good Neighbor		"Circus"	3/28/15	
Good Neighbor		"Miley's Wedding"	10/3/15	
Good Neighbor		"Kyle Vs. Kanye"	2/13/16	
Good Neighbor		"Inside SoCal"	3/5/16	
Good Neighbor		"Pogie's Pepperoni"	4/9/16	
Good Neighbor		"Chris Fitzpatrick Kickstarter"	5/7/16	
The Lonely Island	SNL Digital Short	"Finest Girl (Bin Laden Song)"	5/21/16	Made for Popstar: Never Stop Never Stopping
Good Neighbor		"Love and Leslie"	11/12/16	
Good Neighbor		"Reality House"	5/6/17	
Good Neighbor		"Kyle and Leslie"	5/13/17	
Good Neighbor		"Beers"	11/4/17	
Good Neighbor		"Scrudge"	12/9/17	
Good Neighbor		"Reality House"	1/27/18	
The Lonely Island	SNL Digital Short	"Natalie's Rap 2"	2/3/18	
Good Neighbor		"Rock Vs. Rap"	3/10/18	This is Good Neighbor's final short before director Dave McCary left the show. Beck and Kyle would continue to write and act in short films on the show occasionally, but all subsequent films by them were directed by the show's in-house segment directors.
The Lonely Island	SNL Digital Short	"Sushi Glory Hole"	10/5/24	
The Lonely Island	SNL Digital Short	"Here I Go"	11/16/24	
The Lonely Island	SNL Digital Short	"Anxiety"	2/16/25	Made for Saturday Night Live 50th Anniversary Special
Martin Herlihy	"Written & Directed by Martin Herlihy"	"Social Experiment"	10/18/25	The first short film since Dave McCary's departure in 2018 to be directed by a staff writer, and the first since Akiva Schaffer's departure in 2011 to not be directed by the show's regular segment director.
Martin Herlihy	"Written & Directed by Martin Herlihy"	"Blowing It"	1/25/26	
Martin Herlihy	"Written & Directed by Martin Herlihy"	"Lies"	3/7/26	

== Bibliography ==
- Shales, Tom; Miller, James Andrew (October 6, 2015). Live From New York: The Complete, Uncensored History of Saturday Night Live as Told by Its Stars, Writers, and Guests (2nd ed.). Back Bay Books. ISBN 978-0-316-29506-2. LCCN 2014943177.
- Hill, Doug; Weingrad, Jeff (1986). Saturday Night: A Backstage History of Saturday Night Live. New York: Beech Tree Books. ISBN 978-0-688-05099-3.
