= The Killers of Mussolini =

- Playhouse 90 episode
- Nehemiah Persoff as Benito Mussolini
- Episode no.: Season 3 Episode 35
- Directed by: Buzz Kulik
- Written by: A. E. Hotchner
- Original air date: June 4, 1959

Guest appearances
- Nehemiah Persoff as Benito Mussolini; Harry Guardino as Capt. Luigi Neri; Michael Ansara as Luigi Longo

Episode chronology
← Previous "The Rank and File"	Next → "Project Immortality"

"The Killers of Mussolini" is an American television play broadcast live on June 4, 1959, as part of the CBS television series Playhouse 90. It is the thirty-fifth episode of the third season. The cast includes Nehemiah Persoff as Benito Mussolini and Harry Guardino as an Italian partisan leader.

== Plot ==
The play dramatizes the final days and death of Benito Mussolini. It begins in April 1945 in Milan; a Mussolini associate, Zerbino, oversees the removal of $60 million in gold jewelry from the Italian treasury. Mussolini meets with his ministers and reviews their options. The Blackshirts have disbanded and are unavailable to escort Mussolini.

Cardinal Schuster arranges a meeting to discuss terms of surrender between Mussolini and Marshal Rodolfo Graziani and partisan leaders, including Gen. Raffaele Cadorna Jr. and Luigi Longo. The partisans demand unconditional surrender, but Mussolini opts to flee for Switzerland with his gold. The partisans learn of Mussolini's plan and make plans to capture him.

In Como, Mussolini is joined by his mistress, Claretta Petacci. After his path is blocked by partisan roadblocks, he attaches his group to a group of Germans led by Major Kurtz. When Kurtz betrays Mussolini to the Germans, Mussolini pays a group of Germans to allow him to hide among them in a German uniform. He is discovered in Dongo hiding among the Germans. The local partisan leader, Luigi Neri, confronts Mussolini with his crimes, and the people call for Mussolini to be hung.

The partisan leaders in Milan conduct Mussolini's trial in absentia. They find him guilty of treason and sentence him to death. Mussolini watches from his cell as his ministers are to be executed by a firing squad. Before the firing squad can act, a mob attacks and kills the ministers. Alone in his cell, Mussolini speaks to God and blames Hitler for all that has happened in Italy.

The Communists seek to steal Mussolini's treasures for the benefit of the party. Neri refuses to take part in the plot, and he is executed. Col. Tedesco arrives pretending to rescue Mussolini and Claretta. They drive to Villa Belmonte where Tedesco executes Mussolini. Claretta begs to be killed as well, and she is executed. A few days later, Mussolini is returned to Milan where he is shown in documentary footage hung by his feet "to quiet the skeptics who didn't believe the Duce was really dead."

== Cast ==
Lee J. Cobb, the star of the following week's episode, "Project Immortality", hosted the broadcast. The cast includes performances by the following.

- Nehemiah Persoff as Benito Mussolini
- Harry Guardino as Capt. Luigi Neri
- Michael Ansara as Luigi Longo
- Ilka Windish as Claretta Petacci
- John Dehner as Col. Tedesco
- Eduardo Cianelli as Marshal Rodolfo Graziani
- Lawrence Dobkin as Alessandro Pavolini
- Frank Puglia as Cardinal Schuster
- Erica Remberg as Gianna
- Arthur Batanides as Vito
- Tige Andrews as Bassi
- Alberto Morin as Gen. Raffaele Cadorna Jr.
- Paul Picerni as Lt. Alfredo
- Vito Scotti as Zerbino
- Eugene Iglesias as Tullio
- Albert Szabo as Major Kurtz
- Al Ruscio as Vittorio Mussolini
- Edgar Barrier as Borsani
- John Beradino as The Priest
- Edward Colmans as Marcello Petacci
- Nick Georgiades as Calistri
- Sam Capuano as Guido
- Peter Coe as The Corporal

== Production ==
Buzz Kulik was both the producer and the director. A.E. Hotchner wrote the teleplay.

== Reception ==
The production received generally negative reviews.

In The New York Times, Jack Gould wrote the that play focused so much on the details of Mussolini's flight and capture that "there was little time for any penetrating or meaningful characterization."

John Crosby of the New York Herald Tribune criticized Persoff's performance as "a very actorish performance in a very actorish role" and found Guardino with his "open American accent" to be "terribly miscast." He was also puzzled by the attempt to portray the Communist partisans as the villains and concluded: "Both as play-writing and as political commentary, this is pretty bad."

William Ewald of the UPI wrote that it "can be summed up in a single unhappy sentence: It didn't play well." He blamed Hotchner for employing "cheap emotional contrivances" and "shoddy ironies" and failing to pull the "chunky material" together into "a tight dramatic package." He found Persoff's performance unconvincing but credited Windish with turning in "the only hard and effective portrait in the entire piece."
