= Law of the Plainsman =

1959 American western television series

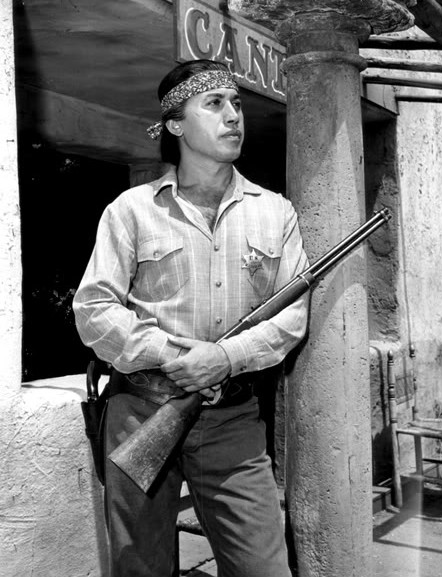
- Michael Ansara as Sam Buckhart.
- Starring: Michael Ansara; Gina Gillespie; Robert Harland; Dayton Lummis; Nora Marlowe
- Country of origin: United States
- No. of seasons: 1
- No. of episodes: 30

Production
- Running time: 25 minutes

Original release
- Network: NBC
- Release: October 1, 1959 – September 22, 1960

Law of the Plainsman is a Western television series starring Michael Ansara that aired on NBC from October 1, 1959, until September 22, 1960.

The character of Native American Deputy U.S. Marshal Sam Buckhart was introduced in two episodes ("The Indian" and "The Raid") of the popular ABC Western television series The Rifleman starring Chuck Connors. As with The Rifleman, this series was produced by Four Star Productions in association with Levy-Gardner-Laven Productions.

Law of the Plainsman is distinctive in that it was one of the few television programs that featured a Native American as the lead character, a bold move for American network television at that time. Ansara had earlier appeared in the series Broken Arrow, having portrayed the Apache chief, Cochise. Ansara, however, was not Native American but of Syrian descent.

== Plot ==
Ansara played Sam Buckhart, an Apache Indian who saved the life of a U.S. Cavalry officer after an Indian ambush. When the officer later died, he left Sam money that was used for an education at private schools and Harvard University. After school, he returned to New Mexico where he became a Deputy U.S. Marshal working for U.S. Marshal Andy Morrison. He lived in a boarding house run by Martha Commager. Other continuing characters include 8-year old Tess Logan, an orphan who had been rescued by Buckhart, and a second Deputy U.S. Marshal, Billy Lordan.

== Cast ==
- Michael Ansara as Deputy U.S. Marshal Sam Buckhart

=== Recurring ===
- Gina Gillespie as Tess Wilkins (15 episodes)
- Dayton Lummis as U.S. Marshal Andy Morrison (9 episodes)
- Nora Marlowe as Martha Commager (7 episodes)
- Robert Harland as Deputy U.S. Marshal Billy Lordan (7 episodes)
- Wayne Rogers as Deputy U.S. Marshal Billy Lordan (3 episodes)

=== Guest cast ===
- Chris Alcaide appeared three times, including the role of Charlie Wolf in "Blood Trails" (1960)
- John Anderson appeared three times
- Richard Anderson
- Rayford Barnes
- Lane Bradford
- Paul Carr
- Roberto Contreras appeared twice
- Richard Devon
- Ken Drake
- Don Dubbins
- Bill Erwin as Dr. Palmer in the episode "The Gibbet" (1959)
- Gene Evans
- Paul Fix
- William Fawcett
- Leo Gordon
- Dabbs Greer
- Chuck Hicks
- Michael Hinn
- Robert Hoy
- Clegg Hoyt as Hungerford in "The Dude"
- Ray Jones
- Ray Kellogg appeared twice.
- Brett King appeared as Costello in the episode "A Matter of Life and Death" (1959)
- Jess Kirkpatrick
- Scott Marlowe as Clancy Jones, a Billy the Kid imposter, in "The Show-Off"
- Ken Mayer
- Tyler McVey as Marshal Penrose in "The Imposter"
- John Milford appeared twice
- Frank Mills
- George Mitchell
- Gene Nelson
- J. Pat O'Malley appeared twice
- Michael Pate
- Joseph V. Perry appeared twice
- Denver Pyle
- Michael Raffetto as Father Robles in "Endurance" (1960)
- Sam Reese
- Cosmo Sardo
- Robert F. Simon as Frank Keller in the episode "The Gibbet"
- Hope Summers
- Stephen Talbot as Stevie Mullen in the episode "Fear" (1960)
- Jack Tornek
- Lee Van Cleef
- Robert Vaughn appeared as Theodore Roosevelt in "The Dude" and as Ross Drake in "The Innocents" (both 1959)
- Garry Walberg
- Peter Whitney appeared three times
- Robert J. Wilke

== Episodes ==
No. in season	Title	Directed by	Written by	Original release date
1	"Prairie Incident"	Douglas Heyes	Harry Kronman	October 1, 1959
2	"Full Circle"	Jerry Hopper	David Lang	October 8, 1959
3	"A Matter of Life and Death"	Richard Whorf	Cyril Hume	October 15, 1959
4	"The Hostiles"	Don Medford	Calvin Clements Sr.	October 22, 1959
5	"Passenger to Mescalero"	William F. Claxton	Palmer Thompson	October 29, 1959
6	"Blood Trails"	Richard Whorf	Arthur Browne, Jr.	November 5, 1959
7	"Desperate Decision"	Robert Gordon	David Lang	November 12, 1959
8	"Appointment in Santa Fe"	William F. Claxton	Arthur Browne, Jr.	November 19, 1959
9	"The Gibbet"	William F. Claxton	Pat Fielder	November 26, 1959
10	"The Dude"	Ted Post	Cyril Hume	December 3, 1959
11	"The Innocent"	Ted Post	Bob Barbash	December 10, 1959
12	"Clear Title"	John Peyser	David P. Harmon	December 17, 1959
13	"Toll Road"	James Sheldon	Calvin Clements Sr.	December 24, 1959
14	"Calculated Risk"	James Neilson	Arthur Dales	December 31, 1959
15	"Fear"	Paul Wendkos	Arthur Browne, Jr.	January 7, 1960
16	"Endurance"	John Peyser	Milton S. Gelman	January 14, 1960
17	"The Comet"	John Peyser	Cyril Hume	January 21, 1960
18	"The Rawhiders"	Paul Landres	Jay Simms	January 28, 1960
19	"The Imposter"	David Lowell Rich	David Lang	February 4, 1960
20	"Common Ground"	John Peyser	Calvin Clements Sr.	February 11, 1960
21	"The Matriarch"	Arthur Hilton	Teddi Sherman	February 18, 1960
22	"A Question of Courage"	John Rich	Donn Mullally	February 25, 1960
23	"Dangerous Barriers"	Paul Landres	Harry Kronman	March 10, 1960
24	"The Show-Off"	John Peyser	John Dunkel	March 17, 1960
25	"Rabbit's Fang"	Paul Landres	Jay Simms	March 24, 1960
26	"Stella"	Paul Landres	James Edwards	March 31, 1960
27	"Amnesty"	Robert Gordon	Lee Berg	April 7, 1960
28	"Jeb's Daughter"	Paul Landres	Arthur Browne, Jr.	April 14, 1960
29	"Cavern of the Wind"	Paul Landres	Richard Fielder	April 21, 1960
30	"Trojan Horse"	Paul Wendkos	Bob Barbash	May 5, 1960

== Production ==
The series was produced by Four Star Television with Levy-Gardner-Laven Productions.

== Broadcast ==
The show only lasted one season. For syndicated reruns it was grouped with three other short-lived Western series from the same company, Black Saddle starring Peter Breck, Johnny Ringo starring Don Durant and Sam Peckinpah's critically acclaimed creation, The Westerner starring Brian Keith, under the umbrella title The Westerners, with new introductions and wrap-ups by Keenan Wynn.
