= Project Immortality =

- Playhouse 90 episode
- Episode no.: Season 3 Episode 36
- Directed by: Fielder Cook
- Written by: Loring Mandel
- Original air date: June 11, 1959

Guest appearances
- Lee J. Cobb as Lawrence Doner; Michael Landon as Arthur Doner

Episode chronology
← Previous "The Killers of Mussolini"	Next → "Dark as the Night"

"Project Immortality" is an American television play broadcast on June 11, 1959 as part of the CBS television series, Playhouse 90. The cast includes Lee J. Cobb and Michael Landon.

== Plot ==
A brilliant man, Professor Lawrence Doner, is dying of leukemia. He is offered an opportunity for immortality by having his brain pattern used as the model for a computer program.

== Cast ==
The cast includes the following.

- Lee J. Cobb as Lawrence Doner
- Kenneth Haigh as Martin Schramm
- Gusti Huber as Eva Doner
- Michael Landon as Arthur Doner
- Patty McCormack as Ketti Doner
- Paul Fix as General
- Richard Carlyle as Schoonover
- Frank Ferguson as DeKlasch
- Barney Phillips as Colonel Bender
- Don Keefer as Leech
- Frederick Worlock as Dr. Samman
- Joseph Sargent as Liggett
- Sheridan Comerate as Driver
- Azaria Port as Agassiz
- Donald Foster as Laniel
- William Boyett as Weiner

== Production ==
The program aired on June 11, 1959, on the CBS television series Playhouse 90. Loring Mandel was the writer and Fielder Cook the director.
