= The Rank and File (Playhouse 90) =

- Playhouse 90 episode
- Episode no.: Season 3 Episode 34
- Directed by: Franklin Schaffner
- Written by: Rod Serling
- Original air date: May 28, 1959

Guest appearances
- Van Heflin as Bill Kilcoyne; Charles Bronson as Andy Kovaric

Episode chronology
← Previous "Out of Dust"	Next → "The Killers of Mussolini"

"The Rank and File" is an American television play broadcast on May 28, 1959 as part of the CBS television series, Playhouse 90. The cast includes Van Heflin and Charles Bronson. The teleplay was written by Rod Serling

== Plot ==
An alcoholic factory worker, Bill Kilcoyne, becomes the president of the local union, rises to national prominence, and becomes involved in corruption and racketeering. He is called to testify before the U.S. Senate where he tells his story.

== Cast ==
The cast includes the following.

- Van Heflin as Bill Kilcoyne
- Luther Adler as Irving Werner
- Harry Townes as Gabe Brewster
- Charles Bronson as Andy Kovaric
- Cameron Prudhomme -Joseph Farrell
- Carl Benton Reid as Senator Henders
- Bruce Gordon as Tony Russo
- Whitney Blake as Martha Brewster
- Addison Richards as Harker
- Wright King as Riley
- Tom Palmer as Eaton
- Danny Richards as Charlie Hacker
- Joe Sullivan as Union Man
- Clegg Hoyt as Guard
- Bruce Hall as Dickson
- Henry Barnard as The Secretary
- Alfred Hopson as Striker
- Jay Overholts as Striker
- Robert Cass as Striker

== Production ==
The program aired on May 28, 1959, on the CBS television series Playhouse 90. Rod Serling was the writer and Franklin Schaffner the director.
