= A Marriage of Strangers =

- Playhouse 90 episode
- Episode no.: Season 3 Episode 32
- Directed by: Alex Segal
- Written by: Reginald Rose
- Original air date: May 14, 1959
- Running time: 1:27

Guest appearances
- Red Buttons as Jerry Shoemaker; Diana Lynn as Louis Shoemkaer; Joan Blondell as Mrs. Francis Patrick

Episode chronology
← Previous "Diary of a Nurse"	Next → "Out of Dust"

"A Marriage of Strangers" is an American television play broadcast on May 14, 1959 as part of the CBS television series, Playhouse 90. The cast includes Red Buttons, Diana Lynn, and Joan Blondell. Alex Segal was the director and Reginald Rose the writer. Original music by Jerry Goldsmith.

== Plot ==
Jerry and Louise Shoemaker are newlyweds who met at a lonely hearts club and rush into marriage.

== Cast ==
The cast includes the following.

- Red Buttons as Jerome "Jerry" Shoemaker
- Diana Lynn as Louise Shoemaker, née Benedict
- Joan Blondell as Mrs. Francis Patrick
- Malcolm Atterbury as Mr. Emhardt
- Betty Walker as Bertha
- Barbara Turner as Selma
- Richard Collier as Mr. Fox
- Jack Rice as Mr. Neegan
- Larrian Gillespie as Sharon Patrick
- Gina Gillespie as Kathy Patrick
- Joyce Jameson as Elsie
- Milton Frome as Collins
- Michael Fox as Teacher
- Pattee Chapman as Millie
- Nancy Kulp as Leona
- Sara Berner as Receptionist
- James Burke as Mr. Sweeney, the Janitor
- Harry Jackson as Telephone Man
- Maxine Semon as Mother
- Burt Mustin as Old Man
- Lennie Bremen as Flower Salesman

== Production ==
The program aired on May 14, 1959, on the CBS television series Playhouse 90. Reginald Rose was the writer and Alex Segal the director.
