= Out of Dust =

- Playhouse 90 episode
- Dick York and Gloria Talbott in "Out of Dust"
- Episode no.: Season 3 Episode 33
- Written by: John Gay (adaptation); Lynn Riggs (stage play)
- Original air date: May 21, 1959

Guest appearances
- Charles Bickford as Old Man Grant; Gloria Talbott as Rose

Episode chronology
| ← Previous "A Marriage of Strangers" | Next → "The Rank and File" |

"Out of Dust" is an American television play broadcast on May 21, 1959 as part of the CBS television series, Playhouse 90. The cast includes Charles Bickford and Gloria Talbott. The teleplay was written by John Gay based on a stage play written by Lynn Riggs.

== Plot ==
A story of murder on the cattle trail in the old West. Three sons, a daughter-in-law and a hired man all hate the dictatorial Old Man Grant and conspire against him. It was taped outdoors in the Conejo Valley near Los Angeles.

== Cast ==
- Charles Bickford as Old Man Grant
- Gloria Talbott as Rose
- Fritz Weaver as King
- Uta Hagen
- Dick York
- Wayne Morris

== Production ==
The program aired on May 21, 1959, on the CBS television series Playhouse 90.
