= Judgment at Nuremberg (Playhouse 90) =

- Playhouse 90 episode
- Maximilian Schell in "Judgment at Nuremberg"
- Episode no.: Season 3 Episode 28
- Directed by: George Roy Hill
- Written by: Abby Mann
- Original air date: April 16, 1959

Guest appearances
- Claude Rains as Judge Haywood; Paul Lukas as Ernst Janning; Maximilian Schell as Oscar Rolfe; Martin Milner as Captain Byers; Melvyn Douglas as General Parker

Episode chronology
← Previous "The Day Before Atlanta"	Next → "A Corner of the Garden"

"Judgment at Nuremberg" is an American television play broadcast on April 16, 1959, as part of the CBS television series, Playhouse 90. It was a courtroom drama written by Abby Mann and directed by George Roy Hill that depicts the trial of four German judicial officials as part of the Nuremberg trials. Claude Rains starred as the presiding judge with Maximilian Schell as the defense attorney, Melvyn Douglas as the prosecutor, and Paul Lukas as the former German Minister of Justice.

Several lines by Melvyn Douglas and a scene featuring Claude Rains referring to the Nazis' "gas ovens" were cut from the audio during the broadcast due to an objection by a gas-company sponsor. The gas company did not want gas appliances to be associated with the horror of Nazi Germany.

In 1961, Judgment at Nuremberg was adapted into a film of the same title starring Spencer Tracy and Burt Lancaster, and with Schell, Klemperer and Torben Meyer reprising their roles from the teleplay.

== Plot ==
=== Act I ===
The play begins with narration by Telford Taylor describing the Nuremberg trials.

Captain Byers, the court's adjutant, escorts Judge Haywood, a New England country judge, and his wife to their luxurious living quarters in Nuremberg. In scenes interspersed with actual footage of Nuremberg under the Nazis, Byers takes Haywood on a tour of Nuremberg's bomb-damaged ruins and of Zeppelin Field.

The trial begins with Judge Haywood presiding. The defendants are the former Minister of Justice, Ernst Janning, two judges, Friederich Hoffstetter and Werner Lammpe, and the public prosecutor Emil Hahn.

The American prosecutor, General Parker, presents his opening argument. He accuses the defendants of constructing the legal framework for crimes of execution, enslavement, and extermination.

Defense attorney Oscar Rolfe presents his opening statement. He describes Janning as a great legal scholar and advocate of democracy who remained in office to save the judiciary from complete domination by Hitler. He notes that Hitler in 1942 brutally attacked Janning for resisting Nazi measures and that Janning was forced to resign. He argues that judges do not make the laws but are sworn to uphold them.

Dr. Wickert describes the special courts led by Hoffstetter and Lammpe that oversaw sterilizations and imposed death penalties on Jews, Poles, and others. Rolfe argues that Germany was not alone in enacting sterilization laws, reading from Oliver Wendell Holmes's decision in Buck v. Bell (1927), upholding a compulsory sterilization law for the mentally deficient.

Rudolph Peterson testifies that his parents were Communists, and he was sterilized pursuant to an order signed by Hoffstetter. Rolfe introduces evidence that Peterson was sterilized as required by the law due to his inability to pass a basic intelligence test.

The judges discuss the Communist take over in Czechoslovakia. Judge Norris notes that the real fight for Germany has begun and the Nuremberg trials have become a political liability.

=== Act II ===
Parker introduces a letter from Hoffstetter about making an example of Polish workers who refused to work and another from Lammpe condemning a "Jewess" who sold her breast milk for consumption by German children.

Geuter, the defense attorney in the Feldenstein case, testifies that his client was tried and executed under a "racial pollution" law prohibiting non-Aryans from having sexual relations with Aryans. Maria Wallner, the Aryan woman with whom Feldenstein was accused of sexual relations, testifies and denies having sexual relations with Feldenstein. Janning was the presiding judge who sentenced Feldenstein to death. Wallner served two years in prison for perjury.

Parker introduces orders issued by the defendants by which hundreds were arrested and placed in concentration camps. He then plays a film showing the horrors of the concentration camps. Rolfe expresses outrage at the playing of the film in the trial of defendants who were not aware of these atrocities. Rolfe also offers letters from refugees all over the world attesting that Janning saved them from execution.

Mrs. Lindnow testifies for the defense. She was employed by Feldenstein and saw her employer visit Wallner quite often. She also saw Wallner kissing Feldenstein and, on one occasion, sitting on Feldenstein's lap. Wallner is recalled to testify. As Rolfe aggressively cross-examines Wallner, Janning stands, protests his lawyer's conduct, and asks to make a statement. A recess is granted, and Rolfe begs Janning, for the sake of Germany's future, not to make his statement.

=== Act III ===
A Senator and General speak outside the courtroom. The General believes the trials are working contrary to America's interests. The Senator tells Judge Haywood that America needs the German people as its friends.

Janning testifies. He explains the environment of fear in Germany and how Hitler made the people proud and told them there were devils among them. Janning and others sat silent at the lies because they believed their country was in danger and that the abuses were a passing phase. The passing phase became a way of life. He criticizes his lawyer for defending the actions of his time. He admits that the Feldenstein case was not a trial but a sacrificial ritual and that he reached his verdict before he even entered the courtroom. Rolfe interrupts and objects but Janning continues. Hahn shouts that Janning is a traitor.

Rolfe makes his closing argument. He argues that Janning feels guilt, but if Janning is guilty so are others. Hitler's intentions were not secret; they were heard in every part of the world. Hahn is unapologetic and claims that Germany was a bulwark against Bolshevism that the world may yet wish to retain.

Haywood announces the decision. He describes Janning as "a tragic character" who "loathed the evil that he did," but asserts that "compassion for the present torture of his soul must not beget forgetfulness." All defendants are found guilty, and Janning and Hahn are sentenced to life in prison.

After the trial, Haywood is visited by Rolfe who conveys Janning's request to see Haywood and predicts that the men sentenced to life will be released within five years. (Telford Taylor confirms in a final narration that the defendants sentenced to prison had, as Janning predicted, been freed.) Haywood visits Janning in prison. Janning expresses respect for Haywood and the verdict, but he asks for understanding that, with respect to the atrocities, he never knew it would come to that. Haywood insists "it came to that" the first time Janning sentenced to death a man he knew to be innocent.

The play closes with an exchange between Haywood and Byers. As the planes from the Berlin airlift are heard in the background, Byers explains that America is fighting for survival. Haywood replies that, "It's not enough to survive," and asserts that if we abandon our basic principles, "we become the very thing we are fighting."

== Cast ==
Telford Taylor, former brigadier general and chief counsel for the prosecution at the Nuremberg trials, hosted the broadcast, which includes performances by the following cast.

- Claude Rains as Judge Haywood, chief judge
- Paul Lukas as Ernst Janning, defendant
- Maximilian Schell as Oscar Rolfe, defense attorney
- Martin Milner as Captain Byers, adjutant
- Melvyn Douglas as General Parker, prosecutor
- Ludwig Donath as Dr. Wickert
- Peter Capell as Geuter
- Werner Klemperer as Emil Hahn, defendant
- Albert Szabo as Rudolph Peterson
- Marketa Kimbrell as Maria Wallner
- Torben Meyer as Werner Lammpe, defendant
- Gregory Gay as Friederich Hoffstetter, defendant
- Wendell Holmes as Judge Ives
- Alex Gerry as Judge Norris
- Oliver McGowan as Senator
- Tyler McVey as General
- Celia Lovsky as Elsa Lindnow
- Mary Adams as Mrs. Haywood
- John Bleifer as Mr. Halbestadt
- Irene Seidner as Mrs. Halbestadt
- John Conwell as Interpreter
- Tom Tugend as Interpreter
- Steven Chase as Man in Corridor

== Production ==
The teleplay was broadcast on April 16, 1959, as part of the CBS television series, Playhouse 90. Playhouse 90 aired from 1956 to 1960. In a 1970 poll of television editors, it was named "the greatest television series of all time."

Abby Mann wrote the teleplay for Playhouse 90. Prior to writing it, Mann met with Telford Taylor who said the Judges' Trial was most significant of the Nuremberg trials. Mann then read the transcript of the Judges' Trial, and it "haunted him". When he was hired at Playhouse 90, he pitched the idea and traveled to Germany to conduct further research.

George Roy Hill was the director and Herbert Brodkin the producer. Telford Taylor was credited as technical consultant. Albert Heschong was the art director and George R. Nelson the set decorator. Dick Joy was the announcer.

=== Censorship and controversy ===
Mann recalled that the story's indictment of Germany, a country that was then a key ally in the Cold War, was controversial. George Roy Hill, who had been assigned to direct, proved to be a strong advocate for the project.

Prior to the broadcast, one of the sponsors, American Gas, Inc., sent a memorandum demanding that reference to the use of gas to kill Jews be omitted. Hill and the cast refused, and Claude Rains proceeded to refer to the extermination of millions of people in "gas ovens." The sponsor had CBS remove the words "gas ovens" so that no sound was broadcast when Rains spoke the words. The censorship was discovered by the press and resulted in negative publicity for the sponsor, with one critic stating, "Shame on everybody concerned."

Writer Rod Serling in a 1959 interview cited the incident as one of the more indefensible examples of sponsor censorship. Serling noted: "It mattered little to these guys that the gas involved in concentration camps was cyanide which bore no resemblance, physical or otherwise, to the gas used in stoves. ... They did not want that awful association made between what was the horror and misery of Nazi Germany with their nice chrome, wonderfully antiseptically clean, beautiful kitchen appliances that they were selling. Now this is an example of sponsor interference which is so beyond logic, and which is so beyond taste, this I rebel against."

Mann later opined that the controversial subject matter and the censorship controversy were the reasons the production did not receive any Emmy Award nominations.

=== Adaptations ===
In 1961, Mann's teleplay was adapted into a film, Judgment at Nuremberg, starring Spencer Tracy and Burt Lancaster. Schell, Klemperer and Meyer reprised their roles from the teleplay. This film adaptation was nominated for 11 Oscars at the 34th Academy Awards, and won the awards for Mann's adapted screenplay and Maximilian Schell's acting.

== Reception ==
John P. Shanley of The New York Times called it a convincing story and credited Maximilian Schell with the production's "outstanding performance." He also found that Telford Taylor's participation helped give the telecast "an atmosphere of authenticity."

UPI television critic William Ewald found the play "pretty uncompromising" as well as "tough and unsettling", stating that it "succeeded in clutching me hard for its full span." He also praised the "four square" performances of Rains, Lukas, Schell and Marketa Kimbrell.

== See also ==
- Judges' Trial

== Sources ==
- Mann, Abby (2002). Judgment at Nuremberg: A Play by Abby Mann. New Directions Books. ISBN 0-8112-1526-1.
