= A Corner of the Garden =

- Playhouse 90 episode
- Gary Merrill and Heather Sears in A Corner of the Garden
- Episode no.: Season 3 Episode 29
- Directed by: Robert Stevens
- Written by: Tad Mosel
- Original air date: April 23, 1959

Guest appearances
- Eileen Heckart as Dorothy; Gary Merrill as Louis

Episode chronology
← Previous "Judgment at Nuremberg"	Next → "Dark December"

"A Corner of the Garden" is an American television play broadcast on April 23, 1959 as part of the CBS television series, Playhouse 90. The cast includes Eileen Heckart and Gary Merrill. Robert Stevens was the director and Tad Mosel the writer.

== Plot ==
After the death of her mother, a teenage girl, Barbara, moves in with her mother's best friend, Dorothy. Barbara learns how Dorothy dominates the family. The husband, Louis, is a whipped and beaten man. Dorothy encourages Louis to venture from his corner of the garden, and the two have an affair.

== Cast ==
The cast includes the following.

- Eileen Heckart as Dorothy
- Gary Merrill as Louis
- Susan Gordon as Lorraine
- Tommy Kirk as Jack
- Heather Sears as Barbara

== Production ==
The program aired on April 23, 1959, on the CBS television series Playhouse 90. Tad Mosel was the writer and Robert Stevens the director.
