= The Steinettes =

American a cappella doo-wop quartet

- Origin: Greenwich Village, New York
- Genres: A cappella, doo-wop
- Years active: 1978 – mid-1980s
- Members: Julie Janney; Diane Shaffer; Nathalie Blossom; Patty Katz

The Steinettes were an a cappella doo-wop street quartet from Greenwich Village, New York, formed in 1978. The group appeared in HealtH and Popeye, two films from director Robert Altman that saw release in the early 1980s.

== Career ==
Consisting of four actresses— Julie Janney, Diane Shaffer, Nathalie Blossom and Patty Katz— the Steinettes were formed in 1978 during a production at the Westbeth Theater. Another a cappella group, the Great American Dream, had been formed at this venue. Early on in their tenure, the quartet sang for donations at the Sheridan Square in Manhattan's West Village area. Eventually, they also served as a filler act for local comedian Phil Stein, and in 1981, they filled in for Rodney Dangerfield.

The group contributed vocal performances to the score of Robert Altman's HealtH, completed in 1979 but shelved by 20th Century-Fox for over two years. During the shoot, they were dressed in vegetable outfits. A year later, they also appeared in another Altman production, Popeye.

In January 1982, Saturday Night Live film producer Neal Marshad produced and engineered a studio recording of twenty songs performed by The Steinettes in his studio at 295 West 4th Street in Greenwich Village in New York City.

During their existence, the Steinettes appeared in commercials for television and radio, as well as in nightclubs. In 1985, they performed backing vocals on three tracks of a self-titled album by dance artist Robey. One of them was a version of "One Night in Bangkok" from the musical Chess, which peaked at #77 on the Billboard Hot 100 in March 1985.

Diane Shaffer, one of the Steinettes, became a playwright in 1995 with the religious piece Sacrilege. Another member, Julie Janney, became an actor by the late 1990s, starring in shows such as Ellen and Another World.
