= Gina Gillespie =

American former child actress

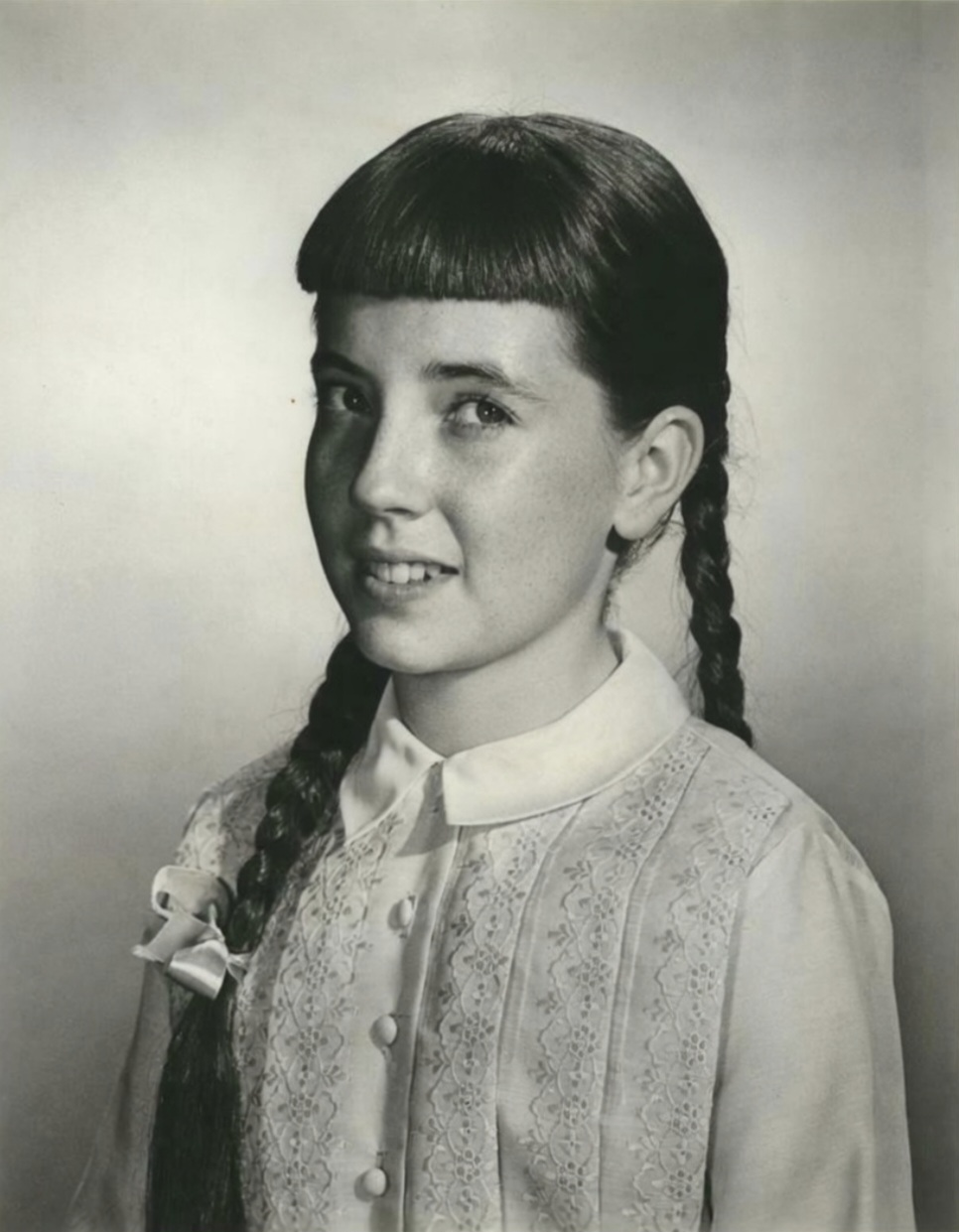
- Gillespie in Karen, 1964
- Born: September 20, 1951 (age 75); San Gabriel, California, U.S.
- Occupations: Actress, Attorney
- Years active: 1958–1965 (as actress)
- Spouse: James MacDonald (m. 1973)
- Relatives: Darlene Gillespie (sister)

Gina Gail Gillespie (born September 20, 1951) is an American former child actress best known for her recurring roles in the television series Law of the Plainsman and Karen, and for playing Pippi Longstocking in a 1961 episode of Shirley Temple's Storybook. She later attended law school and became an attorney.

== Early life ==
Gillespie was born in San Gabriel, California, the daughter of Herbert Gillespie and Rean Tibeau Gillespie, who had been vaudeville dancers. In 1955, when her sister Darlene became a Mouseketeer, the family moved to Burbank, California. She has three other siblings.

== Acting career ==
Discovered by Alfred Hitchcock, Gillespie began acting on television when she was four years old. In 1958, she obtained small roles in Andy Hardy Comes Home and The Lost Missile.

In 1959, she was cast in the recurring role of Tess Logan, an eight-year-old orphan, in the western television series Law of the Plainsman, which ran on NBC from October 1, 1959, to September 22, 1960. Reruns of the series were broadcast on ABC from July through September 1962.

She continued to act in both television series and films, including playing dual roles in Pippi Longstocking, a 1961 episode of Shirley Temple's Storybook. The story differs from the famous children's novel, for it is about a girl named Susan Ann Scholfield who tells her younger sister that, if she had her own way, she would be a girl named Pippi and live in a house with a monkey, a horse and a box of gold. The episode then shows the adventures Susan imagines.

In 1961, she appeared in an episode of Thriller - Mr. George, a story by August Derleth, about a wealthy orphan protected by her deceased guardian, Mr. George. The episode was directed by Ida Lupino.

In 1962, Gillespie played the role of young Blanche in the film What Ever Happened to Baby Jane?, and received good reviews for her performance.

In 1964, she was cast as Mimi Scott, the tomboyish younger sister in the television series Karen, which was broadcast on NBC from October 5, 1964, to August 30, 1965.

Gillespie guested on a 1966 episode of Laredo, but this was her last role. She left the acting profession at age 15, deciding to concentrate on her education.

== Filmography ==
Year	Title	Role	Notes	Reference
1958	Andy Hardy Comes Home	Cricket Hardy	Played Andy's daughter	
1958	The Lost Missile	Little Girl in Underground Bunker	Uncredited role	
1959	Playhouse 90	Kathy Patrick	Episode: "A Marriage of Strangers"	
1959	Face of a Fugitive	Alice Bailey	Played sheriff's niece	
1959	It Happened to Jane	Betty Osgood	Played Jane's daughter	
1959-1960	Law of the Plainsman	Tess Logan	Recurring role in series	
1960	The Slowest Gun in the West	The Daughter	TV special	
1960	Wagon Train	Peggy O'Toole	Episode: "The Albert Farnsworth Story", Colonel Farnsworth played by Charles Laughton.	
1961	Thriller	Priscilla	Episode: "Mr. George"	
1961	The Aquanauts	Lisa	Episode: "Niagara Dive"	
1961	Tales of Wells Fargo	Carol Butler / Cindy Croydon	2 episodes: "Prince Jim", "A Fistful of Pride"	
1961	Shirley Temple's Storybook	Susan & Pippi	Episode: Pippi Longstocking, played dual roles	
1962	What Ever Happened to Baby Jane?	Young Blanche	Played Jane's sister as a child	
1963	The Fugitive	Jenny Ammory	Episode: "The Witch"	
1964-1965	Karen	Mimi Scott	27 episodes, recurring role in series	
1966	Laredo	Kim "Missy" Mabry	Episode: "The Deadliest Kid in the West"	

== Later life ==
Gillespie graduated from Providence High School in Burbank, and married James MacDonald on May 5, 1973. She later attended the University of La Verne College of Law and graduated Cum Laude in 1988. After being admitted to the California State Bar she became a practising attorney.
