= Pippi Longstocking (Shirley Temple's Storybook) =

- Shirley Temple's Storybook episode
- Episode no.: Season 2 Episode 15
- Directed by: Frank Bunetta
- Written by: William Crewson
- Based on: Pippi Longstocking by Astrid Lindgren
- Running time: 60 minutes

"Pippi Longstocking" is the 15th episode of the second season of the American television series Shirley Temple's Storybook. The episode was directed by Frank Bunetta and starring Gina Gillespie as Pippi Longstocking. It is based on the famous children's novel of the same name by Astrid Lindgren.

== Plot ==
Susan Scholfield and her little sister are sent to bed by their parents. Susan is angry. She does not want to go to bed, because she is not tired. Susan also finds it stupid that her parents decide when she has to get up or go to school. She is constantly told to do things she absolutely does not feel like doing.

Susan says that if she had it her way she would live in a big house with a monkey and a horse and a box full of gold. Then she would not be Susan any more, but Pippi Longstocking. She would be able to do whatever she wanted. In addition, she would have many friends, such as Tommy and Annika, two children from her neighbourhood.

Then Susan tells Pippi's story. Pippi moves one day into the abandoned house next to Tommy and Annika. Tommy and Annika are surprised that Pippi lives there all alone, but Pippi tells them she has her monkey and her horse.

The next day, Pippi, Tommy and Annika go to school together. The teacher wants to convince Pippi that she has to go to school, so she can learn something. But Pippi can convince her quickly that she knows everything. She can answer even the most difficult questions.

Later, Pippi is visited by two policemen. They want to put Pippi in a children's home. But Pippi throws them out of her house.

Afterwards, burglars arrive at Pippi's house. They want to steal Pippi's gold. But Pippi can persuade them to end their criminal career and do some real and honest work. The mother of the burglars thanks Pippi for that. She had been worried about her sons, and had been afraid, that it might not end well with them.

Soon Pippi fights against the strongest man in the world, the Mighty Adolph. She wins the fight. For the winner money she buys peanuts and popcorn for all children.

When Pippi celebrates her birthday, she wishes her father is with her now. Just when Pippi has told Tommy and Annika what she wishes, her father storms into the house. He takes Pippi to the South Seas, Tommy and Annika join them.

In bed Susan's sister wonders if Pippi ever returns. Susan thinks she does not. Then suddenly the parents of them realize that someone has moved into the abandoned house next door. Outside, only a horse and a monkey can be seen and a small girl. Susan and her sister are sure that the new resident of the house can only be Pippi Longstocking.

== Cast ==
- Shirley Temple: Narrator
- Gina Gillespie: Susan Scholfield/Pippi Longstocking
- Gregory Irvin: Tommy
- Kelly Smith: Annika
- Renie Riano: Miss Lindquist
- Willard Waterman: Father/Capt. Efraim Longstocking
- Bernard Kates: Scar Face
- Jimmie Horan: Mad Dog
- Tor Johnson - the Mighty Adolph
- Ted de Corsia: First Policeman
- William Edmonson: Second Policeman
- Barbara Eiler: Mother
- Jennifer Gillespie: Little Sister
- George Whiteman: Circus Barker

== Background ==
"Pippi Longstocking" was shown in Shirley Temple's Storybook, a weekly storybook anthology on NBC. It was first broadcast on 8 January 1961 in the US-American television. The film was the first US-American adaption of Pippi Longstocking. Some changes were made to the storyline, among them were Pippi's heightened intellect and her ability to fly. In the United States the film was released on DVD at 3 October 2006. Next to the United States it was shown in Hungary, Poland and Germany.

== Music ==
The Music for the Film was composed by Walter Scharf. Vic Mizzy wrote the theme music for the film. One song of the film was released on the Soundtrack Shirley Temple Storybook Collection (Original Television Soundtrack), which featured songs from all the films shown in Shirley Temple's Storybook. The song was called Sleepy, sleepy head and was sung by Pippi before she went to bed.

== Reception ==
=== Critical response ===
The Dove Foundation believes that the comedy film shows that everybody needs rules. They give the film the Family Approved Seal.
