= Diary of a Nurse =

- Playhouse 90 episode
- Episode no.: Season 3 Episode 31
- Directed by: David Greene
- Written by: Arthur Hailey
- Original air date: May 7, 1959
- Running time: 1:27

Guest appearances
- Inger Stevens as Gail Lucas; Victor Jory as George Bavister; Mary Astor as Eileen Vavister

Episode chronology
← Previous "Dark December"	Next → "A Marriage of Strangers"

"Diary of a Nurse" is an American television play broadcast on May 7, 1959, as part of the CBS television series, Playhouse 90. The cast includes Inger Stevens, Victor Jory, and Mary Astor. David Greene was the director and Arthur Hailey the writer.

== Plot ==
A student nurse at a large hospital tries to help a patient scheduled for surgery and who declines to cooperate with the doctors. She is caught in a conflict between modern nursing practices and patients' need for human and emotional involvement.

== Cast ==
The cast includes the following.

- Inger Stevens as Gail Lucas
- Victor Jory as George Bavister
- Mary Astor as Eileen Bavister
- Mildred Dunnock as Elsie Chiapetta
- Adam Kennedy as Chief Resident
- Polly Rowles as Marie Hertzog
- Ben Cooper as Dr. Tony McKlusky
- Suzanne Pleshette as Alex
- Elizabeth Patterson as Mrs. Leeder
- Caroline Kearney as Wendy Crain
- Edward Platt as Dr. Mott
- Claudia Bryar as Mrs. Jackson
- Barbara Pepper as Mrs. O'Hearn
- Susanne Sydney as Doreen
- Sandra Harrison as Flo
- Henry Hunter as Dr. Morelli
- Joe Conley as Hans
- Paul Carr as Chuck
- Tracey Roberts as Miss Isles
- Karen Forer as Jeanie Jackson
- Walter Burke as Mr. Jacoby
- Nolan Leary as Harry O'Hearn
- Joanne Smith as Night Nurse

== Production ==
The program aired on May 7, 1959, on the CBS television series Playhouse 90. Arthur Hailey was the writer and David Greene the director.

"Gail Lucas", the character name of the student nurse played by Inger Stevens, returned as the character name of the young nurse played by Zina Bethune on the 1962 primetime medical drama The Nurses and by Melinda Cordell on the subsequent same-named 1965 daytime drama. Hailey did not work on the series, but received a royalty of $400 per episode.
