= Marketa Kimbrell =

American actress

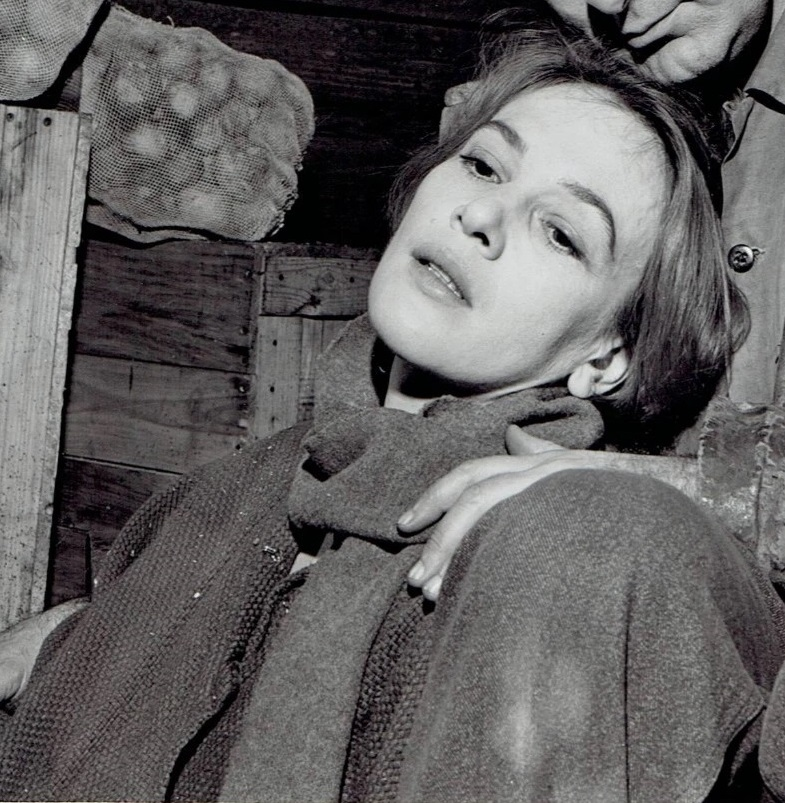
- Kimbrell in Armstrong Circle Theatre (1962)
- Born: Markéta Nitschová; August 1, 1928; Prague, Czechoslovakia
- Died: July 6, 2011 (aged 82); Sykesville, Maryland, U.S.
- Occupation: Actress
- Years active: 1940s–2006
- Spouse: George Kimbrell (m. 1946; death 1952)
- Children: 3

Marketa Kimbrell (born Markéta Nitschová; August 1, 1928 – July 6, 2011) was a Czech-born American actress and professor of acting and film directing.

In 1970, she and actor Richard Levy founded the New York Street Theater Caravan, a theater company which brought stage productions to audiences who otherwise might not have access to theater. Her target audiences included prisoners, coal mining towns, rural communities, Native American reservations, and low income inner city neighborhoods.

== Life ==
Kimbrell was born in Prague in 1928 to Alfred and Josefina Nitsch. She wed an American Army major named George Kimbrell, whom she met at a refugee camp in Germany in 1945 following World War II. She moved to the United States with Kimbrell and was cast in stage, television shows and film. George Kimbrell died in 1952. She taught as a full-time professor of acting and film directing at the Tisch School of the Arts of New York University from 1970 until her retirement in 2006.

Marketa Kimbrell died of complications from Alzheimer's disease on July 6, 2011, in Sykesville, Maryland, aged 82. She was survived by her two sons, seven grandchildren, one great-grandchild, and a sister.

== Filmography ==
Year	Title	Role	Notes
1959	Judgment at Nuremberg	Maria Wallner	Playhouse 90
1964	The Pawnbroker	Tessie	
1973	and the walls came tumbling down	(herself)	documentary by producer/director Neal Marshad, while a student at New York University
1983	Reaching Out	Acting Teacher	(final film role)
