= Dark December (Playhouse 90) =

- Playhouse 90 episode
- Episode no.: Season 3 Episode 30
- Directed by: Franklin Schaffner
- Written by: Merle Miller
- Original air date: April 30, 1959
- Running time: 88 minutes

Guest appearances
- Barry Sullivan as Capt. Schuyler "Sky" Hobart; Michael Landon as Booth Latham; James Whitmore as Major Abe Kasner; Warren Beatty as Wally

Episode chronology
← Previous "A Corner of the Garden"	Next → "Diary of a Nurse"

"Dark December" is an American television play broadcast on April 30, 1959 as part of the CBS television series, Playhouse 90. The cast includes Barry Sullivan, Michael Landon, James Whitmore, and Warren Beatty. Franklin Schaffner was the director and Merle Miller the writer.

== Plot ==
Set in December 1944, during the Battle of the Bulge, a military doctor takes over a Franciscan seminary in Bastogne and tries to convert it into a hospital.

== Cast ==
The cast includes the following.

- Barry Sullivan as Capt. Schuyler "Sky" Hobart
- Lili Darvas as Belgian Woman
- Richard Beymer as LeRoy Cadman
- Michael Landon as Booth Latham
- James Whitmore as Major Abe Kasner
- Warren Beatty as Wally
- Paul Burke as Farley
- Sasha Harden as Konrad
- Barry Cahill as Hank Gaines
- Sam Edwards as The Captain
- Ronny Howard as The Boy
- Brian Hutton as Soldier
- Robert Carson as Soldier
- Ray Foster as Soldier
- Richard Clair as Soldier
- Robert Easton as Soldier
- Lew Brown as Soldier
- Robert Sorrells as Soldier
- Dee Pollock as Soldier
- Arlette Clark as Nun
- Gerry Gaylor as Nun
- Lisa Pons as Nun
- Mary Andre as Nun

== Production ==
The program aired on April 30, 1959, on the CBS television series Playhouse 90. Merle Miller was the writer and Franklin Schaffner the director.
