= Shirley Temple's Storybook =

- Also known as: The Shirley Temple Show; Shirley Temple Theatre
- Directed by: William Corrigan; Bob Henry; Harry Horner; Richard Morris; Robert B. Sinclair
- Presented by: Shirley Temple
- Narrated by: Shirley Temple
- Composers: Jack Brooks; Jerry Livingston; Vic Mizzy; Arthur Morton; Walter Scharf; Vic Schoen
- Country of origin: United States
- Original language: English
- No. of seasons: 2
- No. of episodes: 41

Production
- Executive producer: William H. Brown Jr.
- Producers: William Asher; Paul Bogart; Alvin Cooperman
- Cinematography: Gert Andersen
- Editor: Henry Batista
- Running time: 45–48 minutes
- Production company: Henry Jaffe Enterprises Inc.

Original release
- Network: NBC (1958)
- Release: January 12, 1958 – July 16, 1961

Shirley Temple's Storybook is a 1958–61 American children's anthology series hosted and narrated by actress Shirley Temple. The series features adaptations of fairy tales, such as Mother Goose and other family-oriented stories performed by well-known actors, although one episode, an adaptation of Nathaniel Hawthorne's 1851 novel The House of the Seven Gables, was meant for older youngsters.

The first season of 16 black-and-white and color episodes aired on NBC between January 12 and December 21, 1958, as Shirley Temple's Storybook; 13 episodes of the first season were rerun on ABC beginning on January 12, 1959. The second season of 25 color episodes aired on NBC as The Shirley Temple Show between September 18, 1960, and July 16, 1961, in much the same format.

== Episode list ==
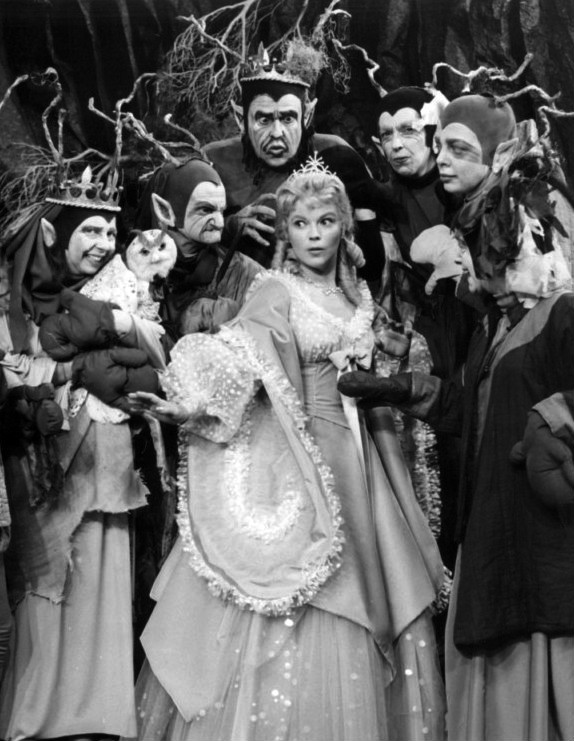
Shirley Temple in the episode "The Princess and the Goblins" (1961)

=== Season 1 ===
Episode #	Episode title	Original airdate	Featured cast
1-1^{[C][L]}	"Beauty and the Beast"	January 12, 1958	Claire Bloom, Charlton Heston, Barbara Baxley, June Lockhart, E.G. Marshall
1-2	"Rumpelstiltskin"	February 2, 1958	Phyllis Love, Shaike Ophir, John Raitt, Pernell Roberts
1-3	"The Nightingale"	February 18, 1958	Thomas Mitchell, Liam Sullivan, Judith Braun, Milton Parsons
1-4^{[C][L]}	"The Legend of Sleepy Hollow"	March 5, 1958	Boris Karloff, Jules Munshin, Shirley Temple, John Ericson, Barbara Pepper
1-5	"Dick Whittington and His Cat"	March 23, 1958	Jack Diamond, Orangey, Sebastian Cabot, Martyn Green, Judi Meredith
1-6	"The Land of Green Ginger"	April 18, 1958	Kuldeep Singh, Anthony Eustrel, Jack Albertson, Sue England
1-7	"Rip Van Winkle"	May 6, 1958	E.G. Marshall, Leora Dana, Billy Barty, Fred Sherman, Ralph Dumke
1-8	"The Sleeping Beauty"	June 8, 1958	Anne Helm, Judith Evelyn, Nancy Marchand, Pernell Roberts
1-9	"The Little Lame Prince"	July 15, 1958	Lorne Greene, Rex Thompson, Anna Lee
1-10	"The Magic Fishbone"	August 19, 1958	Leo G. Carroll, Lisa Daniels, Rex Evans
1-11	"The Wild Swans"	September 12, 1958	Olive Deering, Phyllis Love, Melville Cooper, Grant Williams
1-12	"Hiawatha"	October 13, 1958	John Ericson, Katherine Warren, Pernell Roberts
1-13	"Rapunzel"	October 27, 1958	Carol Lynley, Agnes Moorehead, Don Dubbins, Marian Seldes
1-14	"Ali Baba and the 40 Thieves"	November 12, 1958	Nehemiah Persoff, Thomas Gomez, Bruce Gordon, Miriam Colon
1-15	"The Emperor's New Clothes"	November 25, 1958	Sebastian Cabot, Eli Wallach, Yale Wexler, Richard Haydn, Pernell Roberts
1-16^{[C]}	"Mother Goose"	December 21, 1958	Shirley Temple, Elsa Lanchester, Billy Gilbert, Tudor Owen

- C Episode was telecast in color.
- L Live episode.

=== Season 2 ===
Episode #	Episode title	Original airdate	Featured cast
2-1	"The Land of Oz"	September 18, 1960	Shirley Temple, Agnes Moorehead, Jonathan Winters, Ben Blue, Sterling Holloway, Gil Lamb, Frances Bergen, Arthur Treacher, Mel Blanc
2-2	"Kim"	September 25, 1960	Tony Haig, Michael Rennie, Joseph Wiseman, Arnold Moss, Alan Napier
2-3	"Winnie the Pooh"	October 2, 1960	Shirley Temple, Ted Eccles, Faz Fazakas, Fania Sullivan, Carl Harms, Frank Sullivan, Bil Baird, Cora Baird and the Baird Marionettes
2-4	"Tom and Huck"	October 9, 1960	David Ladd, Teddy Rooney, Dan Duryea, Jackie Coogan, Ruthie Robinson
2-5	"Madeline"	October 16, 1960	Gina Gillespie, Imogene Coca, Ann Jillian, Billy Gilbert
2-6	"Little Men"	October 23, 1960	Shirley Temple, Fernando Lamas, Eleanor Audley, Mary Wickes
2-7	"The Prince and the Pauper"	October 30, 1960	Peter Lazer, Gig Young, Julie Sommars, Ronald Lang
2-8	"Emmy Lou"	November 6, 1960	Frankie Avalon, Bernadette Withers, Shirley Mitchell, Jimmy Boyd, Marjorie Reynolds
2-9	"The Reluctant Dragon"	November 13, 1960	Shirley Temple, John Raitt, Jack Weston, Jonathan Harris, Alice Pearce, J. Pat O'Malley
2-10	"The Black Arrow"	November 27, 1960	Marshall Reed, Tony Haig, Jacques Aubuchon Sean McClory, Carroll O'Connor
2-11	"The Indian Captive"	December 4, 1960	Tom Carty, Jennie Lynn, Doris Dowling, Cloris Leachman, Anne Seymour
2-12	"The House of Seven Gables"	December 11, 1960	Shirley Temple, Martin Landau, Agnes Moorehead, Robert Culp, Jonathan Harris
2-13	"The Black Sheep"	December 18, 1960	Dennis Kohler, Geraldine Fitzgerald, Philip Baird, Gloria Vanderbilt, Liam Redmond
2-14	"Babes in Toyland"	December 25, 1960	Shirley Temple, Jonathan Winters, Jerry Colonna, Angela Cartwright, Carl Ballantine, Joe Besser, Hanley Stafford
2-15	"Pippi Longstocking"	January 8, 1961	Gina Gillespie, Willard Waterman, Renie Riano, Kelly Smith, Gregory Irvin, Tor Johnson
2-16	"King Midas"	January 15, 1961	Paul Ford, Wally Cox, Julius LaRosa, Anne Helm, Lou Krugman
2-17	"Rebel Gun"	January 22, 1961	Robert Morse, J. Pat O'Malley, Jackie Coogan, Christopher Dark, Wesley Lau, Robert Sampson
2-18	"The Terrible Clockman"	January 29, 1961	Shirley Temple, Sam Jaffe, Jacques Aubuchon, Eric Portman, David Frankham
2-19	"The Fawn"	February 5, 1961	Jane Darwell, Jena Engstrom, Charles McGraw, Dan Sheridan, Tommy Turk
2-20	"Onawandah"	February 12, 1961	Shirley Temple, David Kent, Virginia Christine, Richard Keith
2-21	"The Return of Long John Silver"	February 19, 1961	James Westerfield, Tim O'Connor, Tony Haig, Walter Burke, Robert Carricart, Donald Elson
2-22	"The Little Mermaid"	March 5, 1961	Shirley Temple, Donald Harron, Ray Walston, J. Pat O'Malley, Francine York, Nina Foch, Cathleen Nesbitt
2-23	"The Peg-leg Pirate of Sulu"	March 12, 1961	Claude Akins, Miriam Colon, Eugene Mazzola, Howard Caine
2-24	"The Princess and the Goblins"	March 19, 1961	Shirley Temple, Arte Johnson, Irene Hervey, Alice Pearce, Jack Weston, Mary Wickes
2-25	"Two for the Road"	July 16, 1961	Richard Eyer, Theodore Marcuse, Joey D. Vieira

== Book collections ==
Random House published three fairy tale collections under Temple's name based on the first season: Shirley Temple's Storybook (the complete season, except for "Hiawatha" and "Mother Goose", and including one additional story, "The Valiant Little Tailor"), Shirley Temple's Fairyland (selections from the first season), and Shirley Temple's Stories that Never Grow Old (selections from the first season). A fourth book, Shirley Temple's Favorite Tales of Long Ago (illustrated and published by Random House in 1958) includes "The Magic Fishbone", "The Nightingale", "The Valiant Little Tailor", and "The Little Lame Prince".

== Home media ==
The full series anthology has not been released, (Note: The full anthology series has not yet been released as of 2026.) but selected episodes of the second season were released on Region 1 DVD in 2006. First Run Video released all 16 of the first-season episodes, all in black and white, on VHS tapes in 1989. Wood Knapp Video re-released 13 of the episodes from the first season in extended play speed on VHS tape. The episodes were "Ali Baba and the Forty Thieves", "Hiawatha", "The Land of Green Ginger", "The Magic Fishbone", "The Nightingale", "Rapunzel", "The Emperor's New Clothes", "The Little Lame Prince", "Mother Goose", "Rip Van Winkle", "The Sleeping Beauty", "The Wild Swans", and "Dick Wittington and His Cat".

== Award nomination ==
Year	Award	Result	Category
1961	Primetime Emmy Award	Nominated	Outstanding Achievement in the Field of Children's Programming
