= White Like Me (Saturday Night Live) =

1984 sketch from the US television show

External videos
- White Like Me – SNL (@SaturdayNightLive)

White Like Me is a 1984 sketch from the US television show Saturday Night Live, starring Eddie Murphy. James Poniewozik of the New York Times considered it the best sketch of the best episode of the series. Other publications have also listed it as among the best sketches of the series.

In the sketch, Murphy goes undercover as a white man (using make-up), and discovers a world where white people treat each other very differently when they are alone - his character says "they give things to each other for free". It was a parody of the 1961 book Black Like Me by John Howard Griffin. The segment was prefilmed for insertion in the episode, and was not filmed live.
