= Neal Marshad =

American film director (born 1952)

Neal Marshad (born April 25, 1952) is an American film and television producer, director, cinematographer, and screenwriter.

== Early life and education ==
Marshad was born on April 25, 1952, in Peekskill, New York, the son of Ruth Marshad and Look art director and graphic designer Jack Marshad. Marshad grew up in Croton-on-Hudson, New York, and since 1975 Marshad resides in Tribeca in Lower Manhattan, New York City. Starting in 1971, Marshad attended New York University, Tisch School of the Arts, Institute of Film and Television, and earned a bachelor's degree in film. Marshad's screenwriting professor and mentor was Mardik Martin whose screenwriting credits with director Martin Scorsese include Mean Streets, Raging Bull, and New York, New York (1977 film). Marshad was also mentored by professor George C. Stoney who taught documentary filmmaking. Marshad's audio engineering professor was Lee Osborne known for his work as the location live performance recording engineer for both Woodstock the music festival and the documentary Woodstock (film). Marshad's classmates included Barry Sonnenfeld, Amy Heckerling, Susan Seidelman, Martin Brest, Mitchell Block and Leonard Maltin.

== Career ==
Beginning in 1964, Neal Marshad was mentored by Fluxus founder George Maciunas at his father's New York design studio, where Marshad was influenced by Maciunas and fellow avant-garde artists Ay-O and Yoko Ono.

While attending New York University in 1973, Marshad produced, edited and co-directed with Patrice Marden the documentary "...and the walls came tumbling down" examining the work of an improvisational drama workshop conducted by actress Marketa Kimbrell with inmates at the Queens House of Detention for Men in New York City. The film documents how a dramatic play is planned, written, and rehearsed in improvisational sessions. Marshad signed a distribution agreement with University of California, Berkeley Extension Media Center to release the documentary. The documentary was selected for the 33rd Annual Student Film Festival at New York University Tisch School of the Arts, Institute of Film and Television, screening on October 27, 1973, at New York City's Bleecker Street Cinema. The film was selected to compete in the Academy of Motion Picture Arts and Sciences Regional Student Film Competition for Student Academy Awards, and was screened on November 17, 1973, at the Fashion Institute of Technology Haft Auditorium in New York City.

In 1973, Neal Marshad was hired by the New York City-based post-production company Ross-Gaffney to serve as a sound effects editor and sound effects Foley assistant for the motion picture Summer Wishes, Winter Dreams directed by Gilbert Cates. This was Marshad's first experience editing 35mm motion picture film and 35mm soundtracks and he became a member of the National Association of Broadcast Employees and Technicians trade union which included workers in the film industry.

After graduating New York University Tisch School of the Arts in 1974, Marshad photographed and directed a PBS documentary, Sculpture by Isaac Witkin which was broadcast in the United States on Public Broadcasting Service on October 19, 1976, and premiered at New York City's The Metropolitan Museum of Art on November 7, 1976. Marshad and Witkin attended the Metropolitan Museum screening and followed with a Q&A .

In 1978, Marshad collaborated with emerging filmmaker Kathryn Bigelow on her experimental short film "The Set-Up" while she was completing her graduate studies at Columbia University. The film premiered on November 21, 1978. Marshad served as audio engineer overseeing post-production voice over sound recording. The film, written and directed by Bigelow, is a 20-minute black-and-white deconstruction of cinematic violence, juxtaposing a brutal fight sequence with philosophical commentary by two off-screen theorists.

Beginning in 1978, Marshad edited, produced, photographed, post-production supervised, and audio-engineered short films in collaboration with writer/director Tom Schiller for NBC's Saturday Night Live over a 47-year period, commencing with "Perchance to Dream" which premiered on Season 4 Episode 14 and was broadcast on March 10, 1979. Marshad engineered the voice-over recording for actor Bill Murray in Marshad's screening room at 377 Broadway in New York City. The host for the episode was Gary Busey. In May 1979, Marshad supervised the post production of the short film Clones Exist Now directed and written by SNL film segment director Tom Schiller which first aired Season 4 Episode 6 on May 26, 1979, with Carrie Fisher hosting and The Blues Brothers were the musical guest. In February 1980, Marshad collaborated again with SNL director/writer Tom Schiller and supervised the post production of the Schiller's Reel short Mask of Fear, which aired Season 5, Episode 12 on February 23, 1980, hosted by Kirk Douglas with Sam & Dave the musical guest.

Marshad was producer, cinematographer, and post-production supervisor for Saturday Night Live's "Java Junkie" a Schiller's Reel short film featuring Peter Aykroyd and Teri Garr. "Java Junkie" was selected by the National Endowment for the Arts Short Film Showcase and was distributed theatrically in USA. The film premiered on NBC Saturday Night Live season 5 episode 8, December 22, 1979.

Southside Johnny and the Asbury Jukes commissioned Marshad to direct a documentary film including a live broadcast concert at the Asbury Park Convention Hall on August 8, 1979. The film was shown in January 1980 on WarnerMedia's Qube (cable television).

Marshad is credited as both film producer and director of photography for Saturday Night Live Schiller's Reel "Linden Palmer, Hollywood's Forgotten Director" which was broadcast on February 9, 1980, and hosted by Chevy Chase. Marshad collaborated with writer/director Tom Schiller and shot the film entirely in The Battery (Manhattan).

In 1981 Marshad is credited for his post production sound engineering work on You Are Not I (film), an independent film directed by Sara Driver and co-written and photographed by Jim Jarmusch and based on a short story by Paul Bowles. The film was screened in the Master Works section of the 2011 New York Film Festival.

In 1981 German director Wim Wenders hired Neal Marshad to provide film post-production services and post-production audio engineering services for The State of Things (film) and Wenders edited the film in Marshad's 35mm edit room in New York City.

In January 1982, The Steinettes, the a capella doo-wop street group known for their appearance in the Robert Altman film Popeye, collaborated with Marshad. Neal Marshad produced and engineered a recording of twenty songs performed by The Steinettes in his studio at 295 West 4th Street in Greenwich Village, New York City.

In 1982, Marshad won an Emmy Award for outstanding achievement in directing and cinematography for his work for CBS Sports Super Bowl XVI

In 1982, Marshad formed Neal Marshad Productions, and began directing and producing films for IBM in the US and Europe using the ARPANET to facilitate global communications between crews and clients. IBM commissioned Marshad to direct a documentary film about architect Renzo Piano and the IBM Traveling Technology Pavilion in Paris.

In 1984 Marshad collaborated with actor/producer Michael Douglas, Betsy Gotbaum, and Rolling Stone Magazine's publisher Jann Wenner, and the New York City Police Department to produce and direct a documentary film about handgun ownership dedicated to John Lennon.

In 1985, Marshad was hired by Apple Computer Inc. to produce, direct, and shoot "Are We There Yet?" a video intended to address the departure of company co-founder Steve Jobs and the leadership of then-CEO John Sculley. The video featured Apple technologists, executives, and co-founder Steve Wozniak.

On December 17, 1988, NBC Saturday Night Live aired the short film Marshad produced and photographed collaborating with writer/director Tom Schiller titled "Love is a Dream". The film featured Phil Hartman and Jan Hooks. The film was named one of the best pre-recorded moments in all 50 years of SNL history by CinemaBlend.com. The film was selected by producer Lorne Michaels to be included in six episodes of Saturday Night Live between the time it premiered in 1988 and the SNL50 Anniversary show broadcast on February 16, 2025.

In 1989, Marshad started to develop, co-produce, and co-direct with Donna Olson, the PBS television documentary The Conspiracy of Silence. The film explores domestic violence in the U.S., emphasizing its cross‑cultural reach and ubiquity across social classes featuring actress Kathleen Turner. The documentary follows survivors and legal advocates including Denise Brown, sister of Nicole Brown Simpson, and Judge Deborah Kooperstein and highlights work at The Retreat, a women's shelter in East Hampton, New York. Originally broadcast three times between 1995 and 1996 on PBS, The Conspiracy of Silence received a Silver Award at the 1996 WorldFest–Houston (Women's Issues) and an Honorable Mention for Health & Medicine at the 1996 Columbus International Film & Animation Festival.

On October 28, 1989, during Season 15, Episode 4 of Saturday Night Live, Marshad served as producer and cinematographer for the "Schiller's Reel" short film segment titled "Falling in Love". Written and directed by Tom Schiller, the segment starred SNL repertory players Victoria Jackson and Jon Lovitz. The film was shot at Mother's Stage, a production space located in East Village, Manhattan. "Falling in Love" is a satirical take on romantic musicals, featuring Jackson and Lovitz as a couple who reunite and sing together before experiencing an unexpected comedic twist: together falling off of a NYC high-rise apartment building. The film was broadcast as part of the episode hosted by James Woods with musical guest Don Henley.

In 1989 and 1990, Marshad produced, directed and photographed two standup comedy specials hosted by The Improv comedy club founder Budd Friedman and sponsored by Johnnie Walker as a way for talent scouts from The Tonight Show Starring Johnny Carson and Star Search to book up-and-coming standup talent. Judges who attended the taping of the shows and voted to determine the winners were George Schlatter, Jack Rollins, Charles H. Joffe, Estelle Getty, and Paul Rodríguez. The one-hour specials were broadcast respectively on The Comedy Channel in 1989 and on Comedy Central in 1990, for which Marshad directed then unknown comedians Steve Harvey, Ray Romano, Brian Kiley, Judd Apatow and Ellen Cleghorne.

On February 24, 1990, during Season 15, Episode 14 of Saturday Night Live, Neal Marshad served as supervising producer and director of photography for the "Schiller's Reel" segment titled "Hooked on Sushi" starring Kevin Nealon. The short film, directed and written by Tom Schiller, parodied America's growing obsession with sushi culture. Marshad collaborated with Schiller, lending the segment a cinematic visual style. Marshad's direction of photography contributed to the noir aesthetic. The film was shot in Zutto, a Japanese restaurant, in Tribeca neighborhood in New York City.

In 1993, while working for IBM Latin America, Marshad directed a documentary film about making the Vatican Library accessible online.

Starting on May 6, 1993, Marshad began a creative collaboration and media production contract with the Estée Lauder Companies. He was commissioned to interview Estée Lauder and her son, CEO Leonard Lauder to advise and support the company's transition from analog to digital media throughout the company worldwide. Marshad produced videos, multilingual interactive CD-ROMs, the company's first international website, and a live global press conference. Marshad was asked to work with Evelyn Lauder and the Breast Cancer Research Foundation, to expand worldwide public education on early detection and self-examination. Marshad collaborated with and directed former NBC News correspondent Richard Valeriani to help with media training and they produced a taped interview of Evelyn Lauder using three robotic cameras at the Wall Street Journal TV studio, with Marshad's associate producer and editor Joe Tripician.

Marshad started to stream video he produced, directed and photographed on a BBC website he designed in 1995.

On December 17, 1995, The New York Times reported on a group art show and published Marshad's photograph. The photograph was of Denise Brown's hands wearing the bracelet her sister Nicole Brown Simpson wore when she was slain. Another photograph Marshad created, one depicting the hands of Jerry Della Femina, was also included in the show "Nonviolent Hands" at the Vered Gallery, East Hampton, New York.

In 1996, Marshad formed The Marshad Technology Group, a digital agency, and was hired by Chanel, Neiman Marcus, Beiersdorf La Prairie, and the BBC to strategize, create and launch their internet businesses. In the same year, he was commissioned by Speedo, the swimwear manufacturer, to create and launch Speedo.com. Marshad enabled email communication between Olympic Games athletes and sports fans online, for the 1996 Summer Olympics in Atlanta, Georgia.

In 1996 Marshad developed the Marshad Technology Group WebDB Product Suite, an early Software as a service (SaaS) platform licensed commercially on October 28, 1998. The software enabled users to manage and modify website content remotely with a web browser, preceding the widespread adoption of content management systems such as WordPress. Marshad's software provided a dashboard for updating and organizing web content. The system included database connectivity and a modular architecture, allowing for customization and scalability, making it one of the first enterprise-level SaaS tools for content management. One implementation of the software was for a website Marshad designed LaPrairie.com. Marshad developed a personalized consultation tool using an early form of generative Artificial intelligence. The system collected user data through prompts and generated customized product recommendations, representing one of the first known uses of AI in e-commerce Personalization.

On August 11, 1996 Marshad was director of photography (videographer) for the USC Shoah Foundation Institute for Visual History and Education interviews of Martin Greenfield in Westhampton, New York. Under the direction of Steven Spielberg, the Foundation has collected the permanent testimony of over 52,000 holocaust survivors, liberators, rescuers, and war crimes trial participants.

In 1997, Marshad collaborated with playwright Edward Albee and Martha Wadsworth Coigney to create the first website for the International Theatre Institute. The goal of the website was to promote open and free communications among playwrights, actors, directors and all people working in theater around the world. For that effort, Marshad directed and streamed audio interviews which he recorded of Albee. This was the first recorded performance Albee allowed to be published on the web.

In 1998, Marshad worked as segment producer and cinematographer on the NBC Network TV special Saturday Night Live: The Best of Phil Hartman which aired on June 13, 1998, collaborating with writer/director Tom Schiller and actors Phil Hartman and Jan Hooks. The film Marshad produced is the last tribute to Hartman in a special send off by all the current and past SNL cast members who worked with Hartman including Candice Bergen, Dana Carvey, Danny DeVito, Will Ferrell, Chris Kattan, Steve Martin, Mike Myers, Chris Rock, Adam Sandler, and William Shatner. Al Franken was one of the writers as well as Conan O'Brien and others.

Marshad collaborated again with playwright Edward Albee to direct videos of his performances at the Jack Lenor Larsen sculpture garden at LongHouse Reserve, East Hampton, New York in 1999.

Marshad was hired in October 1999 by Laura Mercier and Janet Gurwitch, the founders of Laura Mercier Cosmetics to provide e-commerce strategy, visual design, cloud hosting, and technology for www.lauramercier.com.

The film Marshad produced and photographed for Saturday Night Live titled "Love is a Dream" was included in the broadcast of the Saturday Night Live 25th Anniversary Special airing on September 25, 1999 which won the 2000 Primetime Emmy Award for Outstanding Variety, Music or Comedy Special. and the show was nominated for the 2000 Emmy Award for Outstanding Technical Direction, Camerawork, Video for a Miniseries, Movie or Special, and was nominated for 2001 TV Guide Award for Comedy Special of the Year.

In June 2000. Marshad developed an animated TV series "Walter Miller Homepage" with writer David Sampugnaro and animators Yvette Kaplan, Tony Eastman, Rick Mischel, and Willy Hartland. The show was based on a web property created by Sampugnaro, the five-time Jeopardy! winner and Ultimate Tournament of Champions player. Marshad and Sampugnaro sold the rights to the show to The Harvey Entertainment Company which was Harvey's first production meant for primetime television.

In September 2001, Marshad collaborated with actor Jerry Stiller, jazz singer Cassandra Wilson and actress Kathleen Turner, to direct and produce "What Can I Do?" a public service television campaign for the Citizens Committee for New York City to help residents recover from the destruction of the September 11 attacks. Marshad previously collaborated with the Citizens Committee for New York City starting in 1977 to help NYC residents recover from New York City blackout of 1977 and David Berkowitz (the "Son of Sam") and created the "Who Cares About NYC?" public service television campaign with Diane von Fürstenberg, Otto Preminger, Robert Merrill, Jack Gilford, Dina Merrill, Cliff Robertson, Gato Barbieri, Alan King, Rocky Graziano, Robert Klein, Henny Youngman, and others. The ad campaign Marshad directed was awarded by Art Directors Club of New York and included in its 57th Annual Exhibition in 1978. Marshad's TV spot directorial work for the "Who Cares About NYC?" public service campaign is in the permanent collection of the Paley Center for Media formerly the Museum of Television & Radio and the Museum of Broadcasting.

In August 2011 Marshad signed an agreement with the Apollo Theater to exclusively direct, develop, joint venture and produce musical and comedy filmed entertainment for online streaming to worldwide audiences.

In 2012 Marshad worked as segment producer, segment director, and segment director of photography for a TV special produced by and starring Steve Harvey.

The Marshad Technology Group achieved Google Partner status in March 2014. Marshad was asked, in May 2014, to become DOWNTOWN magazine's Digital Media Advisor, and was offered a board position.

On October 11, 2014, "Love is a Dream", a film Marshad produced and photographed, was broadcast on Saturday Night Live season 40 as a tribute to former cast member Jan Hooks who died on October 8, 2014. The episode in which the film aired was Episode 3 of Season 40 (overall episode 769) which was nominated in the 2015 67th Emmy Awards in the Outstanding Interactive Program category.

"Love is a Dream" aired in the Saturday Night Live 40th Anniversary Special which aired on February 15, 2015, and was the 2015 Primetime Emmy Award winner for Outstanding Technical Direction, Camerawork, Video Control for a Limited Series. The show also won the 2015 Primetime Emmy Award for Outstanding Variety Special.

Steve Harvey and Deep Dish Productions of Chicago, LLC contracted with Marshad in October 2015 to provide Segment Producer/Director/Director of Photography services for The Steve Harvey Show on NBC.

In June 2016, Marshad was named to the International Advisory Board of LongHouse Reserve, by Jack Lenor Larsen, East Hampton (town), New York.

In November 2016, Microsoft asked Marshad to become a Microsoft Bing Partner Agency.

On November 20, 2021, "Java Junkie", a film Marshad produced and photographed featuring actress Teri Garr, was broadcast on Saturday Night Live (season 47) as a tribute to former cast member and writer Peter Aykroyd, brother of original Not Ready for Primetime Player Dan Aykroyd, who died on November 6, 2021. Before the show ends, a photo by Neal Marshad of Peter Aykroyd is shown in silence. SNL also posted the film as an online tribute on X, formerly called Twitter. This SNL episode won in 2022 the 74th Primetime Emmy Awards for Outstanding Sketch Series.

In 2023, Marshad began writing and developing "Tribeca Co-op", a dark comedy murder mystery set in a New York City co-op building. Initially written as a feature-length screenplay, Marshad adapted the story into a television pilot for a limited series in 2024. The plot centers on a building superintendent and part-time stand-up comic who helps expose a decades-old conspiracy involving hidden property deeds, set against a backdrop of class conflict between long-time artist residents and affluent newcomers. Marshad is collaborating with co-writer Dashiell Finley, producer G. Mac Brown, SNL film director James Signorelli, producer Matthew Panepinto, and Irish producer Jack Hudson. The feature length script and the TV pilot scripts were registered with Writers Guild of America West and copyrighted through the United States Copyright Office. On March 9, 2025, a table read occurred involving fourteen New York City actors. The table read was organized by Marshad's associate casting director, Vivian Taylor, at Marshad's loft in NYC's Tribeca neighborhood. Marshad produced and directed a music video for a cover of the Link Wray Rumble (instrumental) on January 28, 2026. The video features Rob Stoner (Rolling Thunder Revue) on guitar and bass, and Aaron Comess (Spin Doctors) on drums. The music was used to underscore the cold open of the Tribeca Co-op TV series while in development and was recorded and engineered by John Guth in his studio in Valley Cottage, New York. Marshad utilized the music and created new visuals for the TV series trailer for pre-visualization employing artificial intelligence (AI). On July 25, 2026 Mexican director/cinematographer Gabriel Beristain joined the production team to direct at least one episode, and on August 19, 2026 actor, director and filmmaker Danny Abeckaser attached to Tribeca Co-op to direct at least one episode. On September 14, 2026 Dann Florek, the acclaimed actor and director known for Law & Order and Law & Order: Special Victims Unit, attached to the Tribeca Co-op television series as director of at least one episode and as an actor playing the role of NYPD Detective Marcus Parker.

"Love is a Dream" the Saturday Night Live film Marshad is credited as producer and director of photography was included in the Saturday Night Live 50th Anniversary Special which aired February 16, 2025. The SNL50 show earned thirteen 2025 Emmy nominations for Outstanding Variety Special (Live) and another for Outstanding Technical Direction and Camerawork For A Special. The show earned seven Emmy wins including the Emmy Award for Outstanding Technical Direction and Camerawork for a Special.

== Personal life ==
Marshad married Erica (née Klapper) Marshad, MSW in 1983 and they have two sons, Cameron Marshad and Tyler Marshad, and grandson Miles Jacob Marshad.
