= Tom Schiller =

American writer

Tom Schiller is an American writer, director, comedian and actor best known for his eleven-year stint writing and directing short films for Saturday Night Live (following the show's original short film makers Albert Brooks and Gary Weis). His films, often featuring members of the original SNL cast, aired on the program in a segment titled, "Schiller's Reel." He is the son of TV comedy writer/producer Bob Schiller.

== Career ==
Schiller was part of the original 1975 writing team when Saturday Night Live debuted on NBC. Schiller was an on-screen cast member for one season. Notable films included the Federico Fellini send-up "La Dolce Gilda" and "Don't Look Back in Anger", which depicted an elderly John Belushi as the last living "Not Ready For Primetime Player," visiting a cemetery where his castmates are buried, recalling their deaths, and remarking he survived by dancing, at which point he dances on their graves. ("Don't Look Back in Anger" noted the irony of the situation in light of Belushi's fast-living lifestyle, with Belushi remarking on the predictions—which turned out to be accurate—that Belushi would be the first cast member to die.) Another favorite was "Java Junkie", a send-up of a 1950s-style cautionary film about a coffee addict (played by Peter Aykroyd) which Schiller made with producer/cinematographer Neal Marshad. Schiller wrote and directed the short film "Love Is a Dream" for SNL again with producer/cinematographer Neal Marshad and starring Phil Hartman and Jan Hooks. Schiller also wrote and directed a feature film, Nothing Lasts Forever (1984). The film, which was shelved by Metro-Goldwyn-Mayer, has never been officially released theatrically or for home media. Featuring Bill Murray, Dan Aykroyd, Zach Galligan, Sam Jaffe, Mort Sahl, Lauren Tom, Imogene Coca, Apollonia van Ravenstein and Eddie Fisher, the film has gained a cult following and influenced a number of young directors.

Prior to working on Saturday Night Live, Schiller worked as an assistant to documentary filmmaker Robert Snyder and directed a film about his longtime friend and mentor, author Henry Miller. Schiller is the son of sitcom writer Bob Schiller, who was a staff writer on I Love Lucy.

Schiller has gone on to direct over 500 comedy TV commercials and is currently represented by his own company, Schillervision.

In spring 2013, the comedy album "Tom and Don", which is a compilation of improv interviews between Schiller and musician Donald Fagen, was released. Schiller's body of work is the subject of the 2005 book Nothing Lost Forever: The Films of Tom Schiller by Michael Streeter. Schiller is married to humorist, community volunteer, author and partygiver, Jacque Schiller, née Lynn.

Schiller's likeness is represented in the film Saturday Night (2024) by upcoming actor and artist Parker Wierling.
