= The Turn of the Screw (Ford Startime) =

- Ford Startime episode
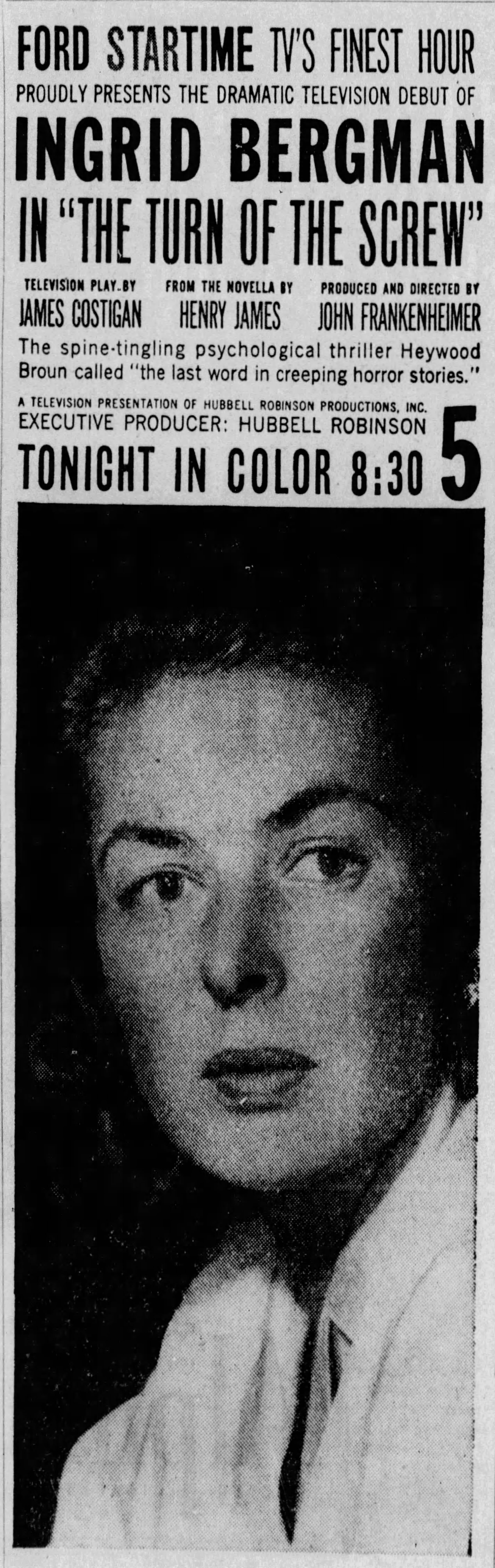
- Advertisement for "The Turn of the Screw"
- Episode no.: Season 1 Episode 3
- Directed by: John Frankenheimer
- Written by: James Costigan (teleplay), Henry James (novella)
- Original air date: October 20, 1959
- Running time: 1:21

Guest appearance
- Ingrid Bergman as Governess

Episode chronology
← Previous "The Jazz Singer"	Next → "The Secret World of Kids"

"The Turn of the Screw" was an American television movie broadcast by NBC on October 20, 1959, as the third episode of the television series, Ford Startime. It was written by James Costigan as an adaptation of Henry James' novella of the same name. John Frankenheimer was the director and producer.

The production was Ingrid Bergman's world television premiere. It won critical acclaim, and Bergman won both Emmy and Sylvania Awards as best actress.

== Plot ==
=== Act I ===
A new governess (played by Ingrid Bergman) arrives at Bly, the country house of a wealthy man. She has been hired to care for the man's young niece and nephew: Flora (played by Alexandra Wager) and Miles (played by Hayward Morse). She has been given complete charge of the children, as their uncle spends his time in London and does not wish to be bothered.

The governess learns from the housekeeper, Mrs. Grose (played by Isobel Elsom), that the last governess died. The parents of the children died in India of yellow fever. Miles arrives at Bly after being expelled from his boarding school. The governess sees a man in the garden as Miles arrives home and is unsure if the man was real or a hallucination.

The governess has tea with the children on a stormy Sunday. She sees the same man looking in the window from the storm. She tells Mrs. Grose that the man has the clothes of a gentleman but a coarse face with queer whiskers, red hair, and sharp eyes. Mrs. Grose says the description matches a valet, Peter Quint, but he died. The governess believes he came for someone.

=== Act II ===
The governess narrates: As autumn approaches, "an atmosphere of terror seemed to settle about the house like an evil twilight mist", but inside they lived "the lie of normality". The governess still knows nothing about the reason for Miles' expulsion.

Mrs. Grose confesses that she was afraid of Quint. He was discovered in a ditch with a wound to his head. The governess believes she is at Bly to protect the children from Quint.

The governess sees a mysterious woman dressed in black. Flora does not see her. The governess believes the woman in black is her predecessor, Miss Jessel. She believes that Quint and Jessel have come for the children.

The children perform a play for the governess and Mrs. Grose. The governess sees Miss Jessel again in the schoolroom and a short time later she again sees Quint. The children behave oddly, Miles standing motionless in the garden in the middle of the night. Miles says he planned the night to convince the governess that he is bad. The governess writes to their uncle.

Quint and Jessel have not appeared to Mrs. Grose. The governess and Mrs. Grose wonder if the governess is hallucinating. They confront Flora. The governess sees Miss Jessel, but Mrs. Grose does not. Flora also sees nothing and asks Mrs. Grose to take her away from the governess. The next morning, Mrs. Grose takes Flora away, leaving the governess with Miles.

The governess speaks with Miles. Miles says they are not alone, as they are also with "the others". Miles tries to leave, saying there is something he has to do. The governess presses Miles for the truth. He confesses to taking the letter that the governess had written to his uncle. Quint appears outside the house, then enters. Miles calls him a devil, and Quint disappears. The governess embraces Miles, saying that he is now free of Quint. Miles then dies in the governess's arms.

== Cast ==
The cast consisted of:

- Ingrid Bergman as The Governess
- Isobel Elsom as Mrs. Grose
- Hayward Morse as Miles
- Alexandra Wager as Flora
- Paul Stevens as Peter Quint
- Laurinda Barrett as Miss Jessel

== Production ==
The production was broadcast by NBC on October 20, 1959, as the third episode of the television series, Ford Startime. The production was filmed in New York City two weeks before it aired and following several weeks of rehearsals.

The teleplay was written by James Costigan as an adaptation of Henry James' 1898 novella, The Turn of the Screw. Before completing the adaptation, Costigan flew to Sweden to meet with Bergman. His final script assigned 1,100 lines of dialogue to Bergman, who appeared in every scene but one.

Producer/director John Frankenheimer used 500 camera "cuts" in the 90-minute production, an average of almost seven per minute.

Executive producer Hubbell Robinson was credited with signing Bergman to appear in the production. Bergman made her "world television debut" in the production.

Warren Clymer was the production designer. The music was composed and conducted by David Amram.

Two years after the program aired, the story was adapted into a feature film, The Innocents starring Deborah Kerr.

== Reception ==
=== Critics ===
In The New York Times, Jack Gould wrote that Bergman delivered a performance of "shattering and chilling power" in which her "fluidly mobile face . . . projected the mounting horror" while at other times she evoked "warmth and sincerity" in bolstering the children. Gould also praised John Frankenheimer's sometimes inspired direction and Costigan's screenplay for carefully building suspense and tension.

Associated Press television critic Cynthia Lowry called it "superior entertainment, even if it didn't succeed in freezing us in horror." Lowry also welcomed Bergman's American television debut in a performance delivered with "skill and conviction."

In the Oakland Tribune, TV critic Bill Fiset called it "a beautiful production and a credit to television." He praised Frankenheimer's skillful use of closeups and camera cuts, his use of shots in which one camera was seen in extreme closeup and another in the background, and his framing of action in the curve of Bergman's neck and shoulder.

In The Miami Herald, Jack Anderson wrote that "Bergman was at her best" and concluded: "In every way, the production was as close to anything I have ever seen on television in all the years of watching it. It was one of those rare dramas that was a television peer of the finest motion pictures."

Author James Thurber praised Bergman's "memorable performance" of "a well-written, well-directed 'Turn of the Screw'". In an academic journal article reviewing all the adaptations of Turn of the Screw, Thomas M. Cranfill and Robert L. Clark, Jr. wrote: "[Bergman's] performance and the production in general were pronounced successes. One doubts than any other TV dramatization inspired more discussion, or praise, in 1959."

=== Awards ===
Ingrid Bergman won an Emmy Award for outstanding single performance by an actress. Frankenheimer and Costigan also received Emmy nominations for directing and writing.

Bergman also won the Sylvania Award for outstanding performance by an actress in a starring role. The production also received Sylvania nominations for outstanding dramatic program of the year and for outstanding performance by an actress in a supporting role (child actor Alexandra Wager).
