= 1959 Sylvania Television Awards =

Sylvania Award
- Sponsored by: Sylvania Electric Products
- Date: January 21, 1960
- Location: New York City
- Country: United States

The 1959 Sylvania Television Awards were presented on January 21, 1960, at the Plaza Hotel in New York City. The Sylvania Awards were established by Sylvania Electric Products.

The nominees were selected by a 32-person panel of critics, and the winners were selected by a committee of 12 judges composed of six television editors from six different regions and six individuals from the fields of business, entertainment, and education.

== Nominees ==
The nominees for outstanding dramatic program of the year included The Turn of the Screw, The Moon and Sixpence, The Browning Version, What Makes Sammy Run?, For Whom the Bell Tolls, and A Doll's House.

Nominees for outstanding comedy program of the year included Art Carney's Small World, Isn't It and Very Important People, and one or more shows from Sid Caesar, Bob Hope, Jack Benny, and Desilu.

Nominees for light musical program included the first Bing Crosby Show, the first Frank Sinatra Show, Startime's Wonderful World of Entertainment, A Toast From Jerome Kern, Music From Shubert Alley, America Pauses for Springtime, and one or more shows from Dinah Shore and Perry Como.

Nominees for outstanding variety show included the Arthur Godfrey Special and Ed Sullivan's Invitation to Moscow.

Nominees for outstanding performance by an actress in a starring role included Ingrid Bergman in Turn of the Screw, Maria Schell in For Whom The Bell Tolls, Siobhán McKenna in What Every Woman Knows, and Jo Van Fleet in The Human Comedy.

Nominees for outstanding performance by an actor in a starring role included John Gielgud in The Browning Version, Laurence Olivier in The Moon and Sixpence, Larry Blyden in What Makes Sammy Run?, Lee J. Cobb in Project Immortality, Alec Guinness in The Wicked Scheme of Jebal Deeks, Van Heflin in Rank and File, Alfred Ryder in Billy Budd, and Walter Slezak in My Three Angels.

Nominees for outstanding performance by an actress in a supporting role included Barbara Rush in What Makes Sammy Run?, Alexandra Wager in The Turn of the Screw, Ellen Madison in Body and Soul, and Colleen Dewhurst in I, Don Quixote.

Nominees for outstanding performance by an actor in a supporting role included Hume Cronyn in Moon and Sixpence and Nehemiah Persoff in For Whom the Bell Tolls.

== Winners ==
The committee presented the following awards:

- Outstanding dramatic program - The Moon and Sixpence
- Outstanding telecast of the year - The Moon and Sixpence
- Outstanding performance by an actor in a starring role - Laurence Olivier, The Moon and Sixpence
- Outstanding performance by an actress in a starring role - Ingrid Bergman, The Turn of the Screw, Ford Startime
- Outstanding performance by an actor in a supporting role - Nehemiah Persoff, For Whom the Bell Tolls, Playhouse 90
- Outstanding performance by an actress in a supporting role - Colleen Dewhurst, I, Don Quixote, DuPont Show of the Month
- Outstanding television adaptation - S. Lee Pogostin, The Moon and Sixpence
- Outstanding new series - Ford Startime
- Best light musical program - Tonight With Harry Belafonte
- Best serious musical program - Christmas Startime
- Outstanding variety program - Frank Sinatra Show of October 19
- Outstanding comedy program - Art Carney's Very Important People
- Comedy writing - Larry Gelbart and Sheldon Keller, Art Carney Show - Very Important People
- Best documentary - Biography of a Missile, CBS Reports
- Best public service program - Population Explosion (CBS)
- Outstanding original teleplay - Loring Mandel, Project Immortality
- Best daytime series - Woman!
- Best educational program - The Lost Class of '59
- Outstanding local dramatic series - The Play of the Week (WNTA-TV)
- Special award - The American Civil War series
- Best religious program - Look Up and Live (CBS)
