= The Wicked Scheme of Jebal Deeks =

- Ford Startime episode
- Alec Guinness and Patricia Barry in "The Wicked Scheme of Jebal Deeks"
- Episode no.: Season 1 Episode 6
- Directed by: Franklin Schaffner
- Written by: John D. Hess
- Original air date: November 10, 1959
- Running time: 1 hour

Guest appearances
- Alec Guinness as Jebal Deeks; Charles Coburn as Colonel Sykes

Episode chronology
← Previous "The Dean Martin Variety Show"	Next → "George Burns in the Big Time"

"The Wicked Scheme of Jebal Deeks" was an American television play broadcast by NBC on November 10, 1959, as part of the television series, Ford Startime. It was written by John D. Hess. Franklin Schaffner was the director and producer. Alec Guinness starred as Jebal Deeks and received an Emmy nomination for outstanding single performance by an actor.

== Plot ==
A long-time bank employee, Jebal Deeks (played by Alec Guinness), schemes to ruin the bank. Deeks works his way up the bank hierarchy as he helps the bank through the chaos and is offered the position of bank president. However, a secretary follows Deeks's plan replicates his sabotage, leading him to resign.

== Cast ==
The cast included performances by:

- Alec Guinness as Jebal Deeks
- Henry Jones as Byrnes
- Patricia Barry as Miss Calhoun
- Roland Winters as Fannington
- William Redfield as Bricklow
- Clinton Sundberg as Berry
- Bartlett Robinson as Elliott
- Peter Turgeon as Auditor
- Arthur Hughes as McComb
- Charles White as Auditor #1
- Woodrow Parfrey as Auditor #2
- Albert Linville as Carpovec
- Conrad Bain as The Minister
- William Hickley as The Painter
- Bill McCutcheon as Teller #1
- Ed Preble as Teller #2
- Allen Joseph as Teller #3
- Isabel Price as Miss Morse
- Barbra Lowe as Miss Lee
- David Doyle as The Tailor
- James Reese as The Doctor

== Production ==
The program was broadcast by NBC on November 10, 1959, as part of the television series, Ford Startime. It was written by John D. Hess. Franklin Schaffner was the director and producer. Hubbell Robinson was the executive producer.

Alec Guinness made him American television debut in the production. For his performance, Guinness received both an Emmy nomination for outstanding single performance by an actor and a Sylvania Award nomination for outstanding performance by an actor in a starring role.

== Reception ==
In The New York Times, Jack Gould called it "a wonderful hour of good fun" and "a gentle and hilarious comedy" perfectly tailored to Guinness's style.

UPI television critic Fred Danzig wrote that the role was "a great treat" and for the first two acts had "speed, was light-footed, thoroughly digestible, sportive and saucy." However, Danzig wrote that the third act slowed and lacked theatrical sense in that he believed Deeks could have handled the upstart who replicated his planned chaos.

Associated Press television critic Cynthia Lowry called it "60 minutes of pure delight."
