= A Trip to Paradise =

A Trip to Paradise may refer to:

- A Trip to Paradise (Playhouse 90), a 1959 television play starring Susan Oliver and Burt Brinkerhoff
- A Trip to Paradise (film), a 1921 silent film starring Bert Lytell, Virginia Valli, and Brinsley Shaw
