= 12th Primetime Emmy Awards =

1960 American television programming awards

- Date: June 20, 1960
- Location: NBC Studios, Burbank, California
- Presented by: Academy of Television Arts and Sciences
- Hosted by: Fred Astaire

Highlights
- Most awards: The Jack Benny Show; The Moon and Sixpence (2)
- Most nominations: Startime (5)
- Outstanding Program Achievement in the Field of Humor: The Art Carney Special
- Outstanding Program Achievement in the Field of Drama: Playhouse 90
- Outstanding Program Achievement in the Field of Variety: Fabulous Fifties
- Outstanding Achievement in the Field of Children's Programming: The Huckleberry Hound Show
- Outstanding Program Achievement in the Field of Public Service: The Twentieth Century

Television/radio coverage
- Network: NBC

The 12th Emmy Awards, later referred to as the 12th Primetime Emmy Awards, were held on June 20, 1960, to honor the best in television of the year. The ceremony was held at the NBC Studios, in Burbank, California. It was hosted by Fred Astaire. All nominations are listed, with winners in bold and series' networks are in parentheses.

The ceremony's format was a sharp contrast to the previous year's. Several Acting categories were either combined or simply removed, and nearly every category had only three nominees, as opposed to the traditional five or six. Due to the relatively small crop of categories, no show received more than two major awards. The NBC anthology Startime received the most major nominations with five.

== Winners and nominees ==
Winners are listed first, highlighted in boldface, and indicated with a double dagger (‡).

=== Programs ===
Programs
**Outstanding Program Achievement in the Field of Humor**: **The Art Carney Special (NBC)**‡; The Danny Thomas Show (CBS); Father Knows Best (CBS); The Jack Benny Show (CBS); The Red Skelton Show (CBS)	**Outstanding Program Achievement in the Field of Drama**: **Playhouse 90 (CBS)**‡; DuPont Show of the Month (CBS); The Moon and Sixpence (NBC); Startime (NBC); The Untouchables (ABC)
**Outstanding Program Achievement in the Field of Variety**: **The Fabulous Fifties (CBS)**‡; Another Evening with Fred Astaire (NBC); The Dinah Shore Chevy Show (NBC); The Garry Moore Show (CBS); The Revlon Revue (CBS)	**Outstanding Achievement in the Field of Children's Programming**: **The Huckleberry Hound Show (Syndicated)**‡; Captain Kangaroo (CBS); Lassie (CBS); Mr. Wizard (NBC); Quick Draw McGraw (Syndicated)
**Outstanding Program Achievement in the Field of Public Affairs and Education**: **The Twentieth Century (CBS)**‡; CBS Reports (CBS); Meet the Press (NBC); Small World (CBS); The VIII Olympic Winter Games (CBS)	**Outstanding Program Achievement in the Field of News**: **The Huntley–Brinkley Report (NBC)**‡; Chet Huntley Reporting (NBC); Douglas Edwards with the News (CBS); Journey to Understanding (NBC)

=== Acting ===
==== Lead performances ====
Lead performances
**Outstanding Performance by an Actor in a Series (Lead or Support)**: **Robert Stack – The Untouchables as Eliot Ness (ABC)**‡; Richard Boone – Have Gun — Will Travel as Paladin (CBS); Raymond Burr – Perry Mason as Perry Mason (CBS)	**Outstanding Performance by an Actress in a Series (Lead or Support)**: **Jane Wyatt – Father Knows Best as Margaret Anderson (CBS)**‡; Donna Reed – The Donna Reed Show as Donna Stone (ABC); Loretta Young – The Loretta Young Show as herself (NBC)

==== Single performances ====
Single performances
**Outstanding Single Performance by an Actor (Lead or Support)**: **Laurence Olivier – The Moon and Sixpence as Charles Strickland (NBC)**‡; Lee J. Cobb – Playhouse 90: "Project Immortality" as Dr. Lawrence Doner (CBS); Alec Guinness – Startime: "The Wicked Scheme of Jebal Deeks" as Jebal Deeks (NBC)	**Outstanding Single Performance by an Actress (Lead or Support)**: **Ingrid Bergman – Startime: "The Turn of the Screw" as the Governess (NBC)**‡; Julie Harris – DuPont Show of the Month: "Ethan Frome" as Mattie Silver (CBS); Teresa Wright – NBC Sunday Showcase: "The Margaret Bourke-White Story" as Margaret Bourke-White (NBC)

=== Directing ===
Directing
**Outstanding Directorial Achievement in Comedy**: **The Jack Benny Show – Ralph Levy and Bud Yorkin (CBS)**‡; The Danny Thomas Show – Sheldon Leonard (CBS); The Red Skelton Show – Seymour Berns (CBS)	**Outstanding Directorial Achievement in Drama**: **The Moon and Sixpence – Robert Mulligan (NBC)**‡; Desilu Playhouse: "The Untouchables" – Phil Karlson (CBS); Startime: "The Turn of the Screw" – John Frankenheimer (NBC)

=== Writing ===
Writing
**Outstanding Writing Achievement in Comedy**: **The Jack Benny Show – George Balzer, Hal Goldman, Sam Perrin and Al Gordon (CBS)**‡; The Ballad of Louie the Louse – Nat Hiken (CBS); Father Knows Best – Dorothy Cooper and Roswell Rogers (CBS)	**Outstanding Writing Achievement in Drama**: **The Twilight Zone – Rod Serling (CBS)**‡; Playhouse 90: "Project Immortality" – Loring Mandel (CBS); Startime: "The Turn of the Screw" – James Costigan (NBC)
**Outstanding Writing Achievement in the Documentary Field**: **CBS Reports: "The Population Explosion" – Howard K. Smith and Av Westin (CBS)**‡; Project XX: "Life in the Thirties" – Richard Hanser (NBC); The Twentieth Century: "From Kaiser to Fuehrer" – James Benjamin (CBS)

== Most major nominations ==
Networks with multiple major nominations (Note: "Major" constitutes the categories listed above: Program, Acting, Directing, and Writing. Does not include the technical categories.)
Network	Number of Nominations
CBS	32
NBC	17
ABC	3

Programs with multiple major nominations
Program	Category	Network	Number of Nominations
Startime	Drama	NBC	5
Father Knows Best	Comedy	CBS	3
The Jack Benny Show	Comedy	CBS	3
The Moon and Sixpence	Drama	NBC	3
Playhouse 90	Drama	CBS	3
CBS Reports	Documentary/Public Affairs	CBS	2
The Danny Thomas Show	Comedy	CBS	2
DuPont Show of the Month	Drama	CBS	2
The Red Skelton Show	Comedy	CBS	2
The Twentieth Century	Documentary/Public Affairs	CBS	2
The Untouchables	Drama	ABC	2

== Most major awards ==
Networks
Network	Number of Awards
CBS	8
NBC	4

Programs with multiple major awards
Program	Category	Network	Number of Awards
The Jack Benny Show	Comedy	CBS	2
The Moon and Sixpence	Drama	NBC	2
