= For Whom the Bell Tolls =

1940 novel by Ernest Hemingway

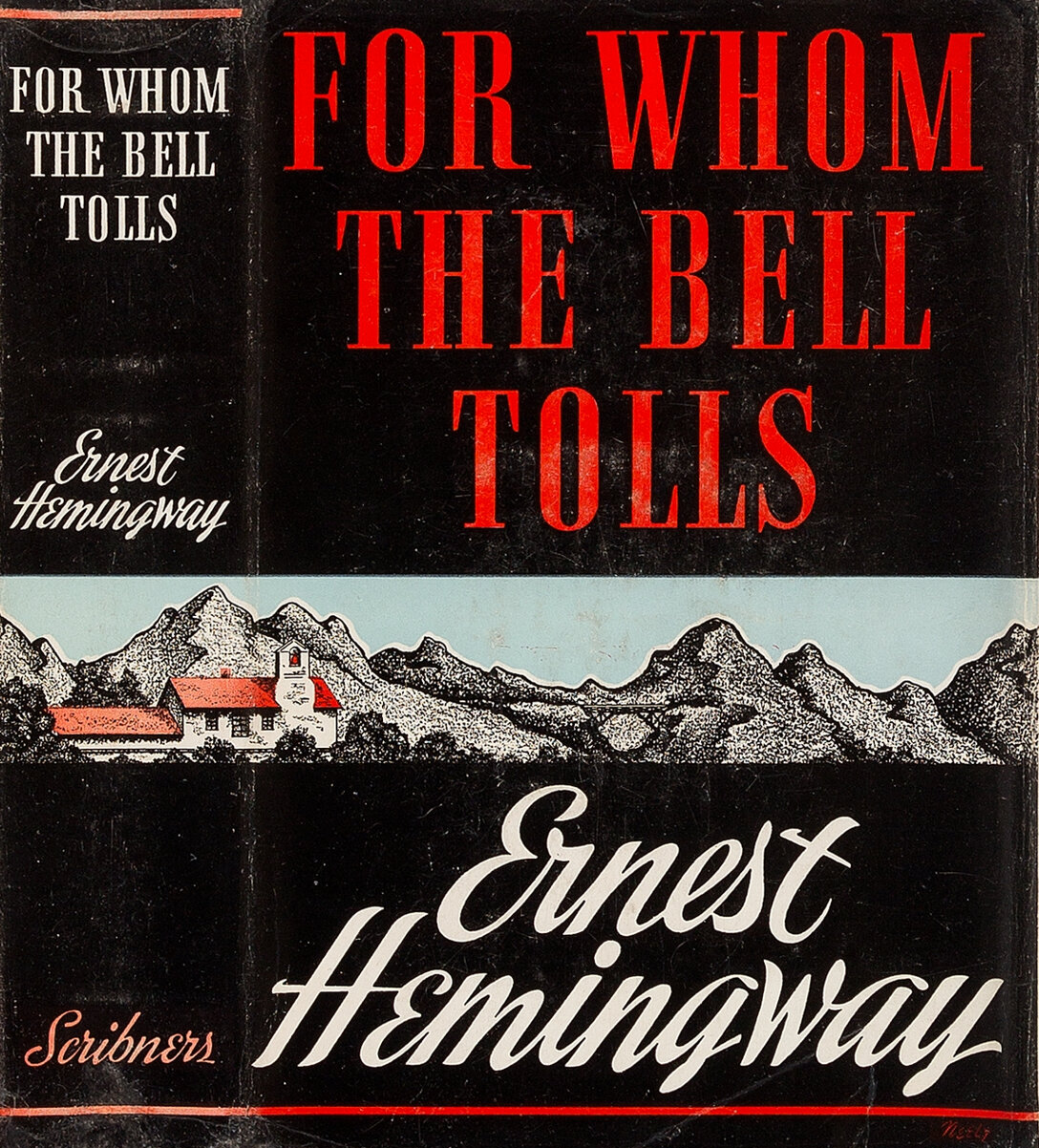
- First edition cover
- Author: Ernest Hemingway
- Language: English
- Genre: War novel
- Publisher: Charles Scribner's Sons
- Publication date: October 21, 1940
- Publication place: United States

For Whom the Bell Tolls is a novel by Ernest Hemingway published in 1940. It tells the story of Robert Jordan, a young American volunteer attached to a Republican guerrilla unit during the Spanish Civil War. As a demolitions expert, he is assigned to blow up a bridge during the Segovia Offensive.

It was published just after the end of the Spanish Civil War (1936–1939), which had been covered in detail in international media at the time. The writer assumes his audience knows that the war was between the leftist government of the Second Spanish Republic, which many foreigners went to Spain to help, and the Nationalist faction, which was supported by Nazi Germany and Fascist Italy. In 1940, the year the book was published, the United States had not yet entered World War II.

The novel is regarded as one of Hemingway's best works, along with The Sun Also Rises, A Farewell to Arms, and The Old Man and the Sea.

== Plot summary ==
Robert Jordan is an American, formerly a professor of Spanish language at the University of Montana. He had lived in prewar Spain, and fights as an irregular soldier for the Republic against Francisco Franco's fascist forces. An experienced demolition expert, he is ordered by a Soviet general to travel behind enemy lines and destroy a bridge with the aid of a band of local anti-fascist guerrillas to prevent enemy troops from responding to an upcoming offensive. On his mission, Jordan meets the rebel Anselmo, the "old man", who brings him to a hidden guerrilla camp in the Sierra de Guadarrama mountains between Madrid and Segovia. Anselmo initially acts as an intermediary between Jordan and the other guerrilla fighters. They include Agustín, Primitivo, Fernando, brothers Andrés and Eladio, and Rafael, often referred to pejoratively as "the gypsy".

In the camp, Jordan encounters María, a young Spanish woman whose life has been shattered by her parents' execution and her rape at the hands of the Falangists (part of the fascist coalition) at the outbreak of the war. His strong sense of duty clashes with both the unwillingness of the guerrilla leader Pablo to commit to an operation that would endanger himself and his band and Jordan's own new-found lust for life, which arises from his love for María. Pablo's wife, the strong-willed Pilar, with the support of the other guerrillas, displaces Pablo as the group leader and pledges the allegiance of the guerrillas to Jordan's mission.

When another band of anti-fascist guerrillas, led by El Sordo, is surrounded and killed during a raid they conducted in support of Jordan's mission, Pablo steals the dynamite detonators and exploder, hoping to prevent the demolition and to avoid fascist reprisals. Although he disposes of the detonators and exploder by throwing them down a gorge into the river, Pablo regrets abandoning his comrades and returns to assist in the operation.

The enemy, apprised of the coming offensive, has prepared to ambush it in force and it seems unlikely that the blown bridge will do much to prevent a rout. However, Jordan understands that he must still demolish the bridge unless he receives explicit orders to the contrary. Lacking the detonation equipment stolen by Pablo, Jordan devises an alternative method: exploding the dynamite by using hand grenades with wires attached so that their pins can be pulled from a distance. The improvised plan is considerably more dangerous as the guerrillas must be nearer to the explosion. While Pilar, Pablo, and other guerrillas attack the posts at the two ends of the bridge, Jordan and Anselmo plant and detonate the dynamite, costing Anselmo his life when he is hit by a piece of shrapnel. While escaping, Jordan is maimed when a tank shoots his horse out from under him. Knowing that his wound is so severe that it is highly unlikely that he will survive and that he would slow the others down, he bids farewell to María and ensures her escape to safety with the surviving guerrillas. He refuses Agustín's offer to shoot him and lies waiting in agony, hoping to kill an enemy officer and delay the pursuit of his comrades before he dies. The narrative ends with Jordan waiting for the perfect opportunity to launch his ambush, if he does not go unconscious (or die) first.

== Characters ==
- Robert Jordan – American university instructor of the Spanish language and a specialist in demolitions and explosives.
- Anselmo – Elderly guide to Robert Jordan.
- Golz – Soviet officer who ordered the bridge's demolition.
- Pablo – Leader of a group of anti-fascist guerrillas.
- Rafael – Well-intentioned yet incompetent and lazy guerrilla, and a gypsy.
- María – Robert Jordan's young lover.
- Pilar – Pablo's wife. An aged but strong woman, she is the de facto leader of the guerrilla band.
- Karkov – Soviet agent and journalist in Madrid, and a friend of Jordan's.
- Agustín – Foul-mouthed, middle-aged guerrilla.
- El Sordo – Leader of a fellow band of guerrillas.
- Fernando – Middle-aged guerrilla.
- Andrés and Eladio – Brothers and members of Pablo's band.
- Primitivo – Old guerrilla in Pablo's band.
- Joaquín – Enthusiastic teenaged communist, a member of Sordo's band.

== Background ==
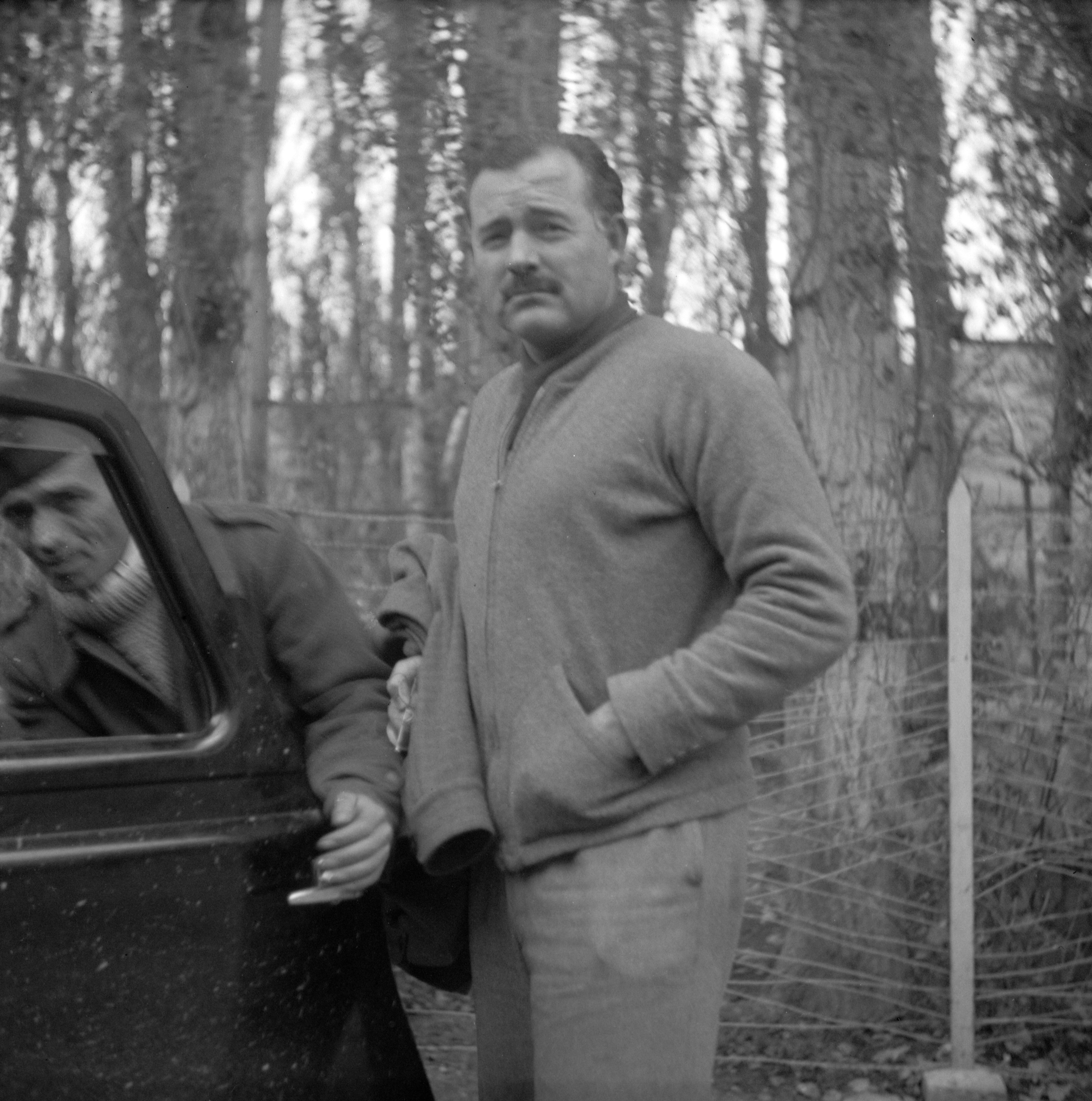
Hemingway visiting the Abraham Lincoln Brigade in Spain, December 1937

Ernest Hemingway wrote For Whom the Bell Tolls in 1939 from three locations: Havana, Cuba; Key West, Florida; and Sun Valley, Idaho. In Cuba, he lived in the Hotel Ambos Mundos, where he worked on the manuscript. The novel was finished in July 1940 at the InterContinental New York Barclay Hotel in New York City and published in October. The story is based on Hemingway's experiences during the Spanish Civil War as a reporter for the North American Newspaper Alliance and features an American who fights alongside Spanish guerrillas for the Republicans. The novel graphically describes the brutality of the war and is told primarily through the thoughts and experiences of the protagonist, Robert Jordan.

The characters in the novel include those who are purely fictional, those based on real people but fictionalized, and those who were actual figures in the war. Set in the Sierra de Guadarrama mountain range between Madrid and Segovia, the action takes place during four days and three nights. For Whom the Bell Tolls became a Book of the Month Club choice, sold half a million copies within months, was a finalist for the Pulitzer Prize, and became a literary triumph for Hemingway. Published on October 21, 1940, the first edition print run was 75,000 copies priced at $2.75.

The book's title is taken from the metaphysical poet John Donne's series of meditations and prayers on health, pain, and sickness (written while Donne was convalescing from a nearly fatal illness) published in 1624 as Devotions upon Emergent Occasions, specifically Meditation XVII. Hemingway quotes part of the meditation (using Donne's original spelling) in the book's epigraph. Donne refers to the practice of funeral tolling, universal in his time.

No man is an Island, intire of it selfe; every man is a piece of the Continent, a part of the maine; if a Clod bee washed away by the Sea, Europe is the lesse, as well as if a Promontorie were, as well as if a Mannor of thy friends or of thine owne were; any mans death diminishes me, because I am involved in Mankinde; And therefore never send to know for whom the bell tolls; It tolls for thee.

Due to the popularity of Hemingway's book, this text became known to many people who never read any other of Donne's works.

== Imagery ==
The novel contains imagery of soil and earth. The imagery appears rather famously at the start of chapter 13. Jordan and María have sex in a meadow in the forest. He feels "the earth move out and away from under them." Then afterwards he asks María, "Did thee feel the earth move?" to which she responds affirmatively. Variants of this phrase have become a cultural cliché, often used humorously. The Oxford English Dictionary contains the phrase 'the earth moves' and describes it as 'used to refer to the experience of having an orgasm', 'first attested in For Whom The Bell Tolls by Ernest Hemingway'.

== References to contemporary events ==
The novel takes place in late May 1937, during the second year of the Spanish Civil War. References made to Valladolid, Segovia, El Escorial, and Madrid suggest the novel takes place within the build-up to the Republican attempt to relieve the siege of Madrid.

The earlier battle of Guadalajara and the general chaos and disorder (and, more generally, the doomed cause of Republican Spain) serve as a backdrop to the novel: Robert Jordan notes, for instance, that he follows the Communists because of their superior discipline, an allusion to the split and infighting between anarchist and communist factions on the Republican side.

The famous and pivotal scene described in Chapter 10, in which Pilar describes the execution of various fascist figures in her village, is drawn from events that took place in Ronda in 1936. Although Hemingway later claimed (in a 1954 letter to Bernard Berenson) to have completely fabricated the scene, he in fact drew upon the events at Ronda, embellishing the event by imagining an execution line leading up to the cliff face.

A number of actual figures that played a role in the Spanish Civil War are also referred to in the book, including these:

- Vicente Rojo Lluch, the Chief of the General Staff of the Spanish Republican Army, in Chapter 1.
- Gonzalo Queipo de Llano, a Nationalist military leader under Franco noted for his radio broadcasts, in Chapter 8.
- Alejandro Lerroux and Indalecio Prieto, Spanish Republican leaders prior to and the latter during the Spanish Civil War, in Chapter 13.
- Enrique Líster, communist leader who played important roles during the defense of Madrid, in Chapter 15.
- Andreu Nin, one of the founders of the Workers' Party of Marxist Unification (POUM), the party mocked by Karkov in Chapter 18.
- Juan Modesto, a Republican army officer described as "most trusted...by the Russians," in Chapter 18.
- Valentín González, a Spanish Republican commander also known as El Campesino, "the Peasant," in Chapter 18.
- Manfred Stern as "Kleber," Máté Zalka as "Lucasz," Hans Beimler, and János Gálicz as "Gall" in Chapter 18.
- Mikhail Koltsov, Soviet journalist who was the basis for the character Karkov.
- General José Miaja, in charge of the defense of Madrid in October 1936, in Chapter 35
- Dolores Ibárruri, better known as La Pasionaria, extensively discussed by the group of El Sordo for allegedly sending her son to the Soviet Union during the war, in Chapter 32.
- Francisco Largo Caballero, trade unionist and prime minister of the Spanish Republic during the Spanish Civil War, in Chapter 35.
- Carlos Asensio Cabanillas, Spanish military leader of the Nationalist Army who led an advance during the Siege of Madrid, in Chapter 35.
- Robert Hale Merriman, leader of the American Volunteers in the International Brigades, and his wife Marion, were well known to Hemingway and served possibly as a model for Hemingway's own hero.
- André Marty, a leading French Communist and political officer in the International Brigades, makes a brief but significant appearance in Chapter 42. Hemingway depicts Marty as a vicious intriguer whose paranoia interferes with Republican objectives in the war.
- Karol Świerczewski, a Polish general who served in the Spanish Civil War as leader of several International Brigades under the name "Walter," was the basis for the character General Golz.
- Francisco Franco, commander of the rebel army who will become the ruling dictator after the war.

== Critical reception and impact ==
On November 5, 2019, BBC News listed For Whom the Bell Tolls on its list of the 100 most inspiring novels.

=== Censorship ===
In 1940, For Whom the Bell Tolls was declared non-mailable by the U.S. Post Office.

In 1973, the book was banned in Turkey because the book included "propaganda unfavorable to the state." On February 21 of that year, eleven Turkish book publishers and eight booksellers "went on trial before an Istanbul martial law tribunal on charges of publishing, possessing, and selling books in violation of an order of the Istanbul martial law command. They faced possible sentences of between one month's and six months’ imprisonment and the confiscation of their books."

=== Language ===
Since its publication, the prose style and dialogue in Hemingway's novel have been the source of negative critical reaction. For example, Edmund Wilson, in a tepid review, noted the encumbrance of "a strange atmosphere of literary medievalism" in the relationship between Robert Jordan and Maria.

Additionally, much of the dialogue in the novel is an implied direct translation from Spanish, producing an often strained English equivalent. For example, Hemingway uses the construction "what passes that", which is an implied translation of the Spanish construction qué pasa que. This translation extends to the use of linguistic "false friends", such as "rare" (from raro) instead of "strange" and "syndicate" (from sindicato) instead of "trade union".

=== Pulitzer Prize snub ===
In 1941, the Pulitzer Prize committee for letters unanimously recommended For Whom the Bell Tolls be awarded the Pulitzer Prize for the Novel for that year. The Pulitzer Board agreed. However, Nicholas Murray Butler, president of Columbia University and ex officio head of the Pulitzer board at that time, found the novel offensive and persuaded the board to reverse its determination; no Pulitzer was given for the category of novel that year.

=== In Spain ===
In 1944, the book was first published in Spanish by an Argentinian publishing house, Editorial Claridad, with many subsequent editions produced either in Argentina or in Mexico. In Spain, it was initially viewed very suspiciously by the Francoist censorship office; in 1942–43 the Spanish diplomatic corps went to great lengths in trying to influence the final edit of the Hollywood film based on the novel, which was not permitted to be shown in Spanish cinemas. Since 1953, when The Old Man and the Sea was published in Madrid, most of Hemingway's stories and novels had been published in Spain. However, this was not the case with For Whom the Bell Tolls, although the novel was at times discussed in the press. Prohibition of the book's publishing was rescinded only in late 1968. By the end of the year Por quién doblan las campanas had been published by Editorial Planeta.

== Legacy ==
=== Adaptations ===
- A film adaptation titled For Whom the Bell Tolls was released in 1943.
- In 1959, a television adaptation For Whom the Bell Tolls was broadcast in two parts on CBS's Playhouse 90.
- In 1965, the BBC produced another television adaptation For Whom the Bell Tolls as a four-part serial and a miniseries in American English.
- In 1978, the Takarazuka Revue adapted the novel as a musical drama (誰がために鐘は鳴る: Ta ga Tame ni Kane wa Naru), produced by Star Troupe. Cosmos Troupe revived the show in 2011.
- In October 2014, the novel was dramatized in a two-part series on BBC Radio 4.

=== Documentary ===
- The 2012 film Hemingway and Gellhorn depicts Hemingway's time in Spain during the Spanish Civil War when he was completing work on For Whom the Bell Tolls, and his relationship with the American novelist, travel writer and war correspondent Martha Gellhorn, whom he credited with having inspired him to write the novel, and to whom he dedicated it.

== See also ==
- Le Monde's 100 Books of the Century
- "Yank" Levy, writer of Guerrilla Warfare who was in Spain at the time and endorsed this book
- Homage to Catalonia, memoir by George Orwell recounting his personal experiences fighting in the Spanish Civil War.
