= What a Woman! =

1943 film by Irving Cummings

- Poster
- Directed by: Irving Cummings
- Screenplay by: Therese Lewis; Barry Trivers
- Based on: Erik Charell (original story)
- Starring: Rosalind Russell; Brian Aherne
- Cinematography: Joseph Walker
- Edited by: Al Clark
- Music by: John Leipold
- Production company: Columbia Pictures
- Distributed by: Columbia Pictures
- Release date: December 28, 1943
- Running time: 94 minutes
- Country: United States
- Language: English

What a Woman! is a 1943 American romantic comedy film directed by Irving Cummings and starring Rosalind Russell and Brian Aherne.

The screenplay concerns a literary agent Carol Ainsley's trying to transform her star client, Michael Cobb, into the actor playing his most famous character. After it becomes obvious that it's impossible and he quits, Henry Pepper, a journalist writing a profile on the agent, calls him and convinces him that he's in love with Carol. Michael returns and the media embellishes their relationship constraining Carol to lead him on.

== Plot ==
Henry Pepper (Brian Aherne), top writer for Knickerbocker magazine, is assigned to write a profile on Carol Ainsley (Rosalind Russell), who has been named the outstanding career woman of the year. Carol, a super agent and star-maker, has just scooped her competition by selling the movie rights to the romance novel Whirlwind and is spending a fortune to find the perfect actor to play the male lead. When Carol learns that the book's author, Anthony Street, may be the man to play his own hero, she searches him out and discovers that he is actually Professor Michael Cobb (Willard Parker) of Buxton College.

Although handsome and blonde, the professor is an intellectual snob immersed in Elizabethan literature, and consequently, is horrified when he is exposed as the writer of a romance novel. While at Buxton, Carol gets Michael in trouble with the faculty and convinces him to accompany her to New York. There she takes over his life, arranging for lessons in comportment and charm. Michael is a failure at speaking the romantic words he wrote, however, and after his screen test proves a dismal failure, he decides to return to Buxton.

Henry, meanwhile, has become intrigued by Carol and has decided that she would be terrific if she developed her human side more. Intending to see if she has anything other than a dollar sign for a heart, Henry contacts Michael and convinces the professor that he is in love with Carol. While radiating the charm and assurance that Carol has taught him, Michael begins to court her. Their courtship becomes headline news, and although she is not in love with him, Carol is afraid to tell him the truth for fear that he might walk out on his contract.

Henry is thoroughly enjoying Carol's predicament until he kisses her and begins to fall in love with her himself. When Carol tries to trick Michael into going to Hollywood while she takes refuge at her father's house in Washington, D.C., Michael outsmarts her, follows her home and announces their engagement. Thus trapped, Carol agrees to the marriage.

On the eve of the wedding, the guests are socializing in the various rooms of the Ainsley house when Carol, angry at Henry for agreeing to be the best man, goes to his room to confront him. After Henry insults Carol and accuses her of being only a "ten percent woman," she slaps him, runs into the hallway and announces that she is calling off the wedding because she is not in love with Michael and refuses to be married just for the sake of business. Henry listens to her speech in admiration, and when she finishes, she rushes into his arms.

== Cast ==
- Rosalind Russell as Carol Ainsley
- Brian Aherne as Henry Pepper
- Willard Parker as Michael Cobb
- Alan Dinehart as Pat O'Shea
- Edward Fielding as Sen. Howard Ainsley
- Ann Savage as Jane Drake
- Norma Varden as Miss Timmons
- Douglas Wood as Dean Alfred B. Shaeffer
- Grady Sutton as Mr. Clark
