= For Whom the Bell Tolls (Playhouse 90) =

- Playhouse 90 episodes
- Cast photo
- Episode nos.: Season 3 Episodes 23/24
- Directed by: John Frankenheimer
- Written by: A. E. Hotchner (television play), Ernest Hemingway (novel)
- Original air dates: March 12, 1959; March 19, 1959
- Running time: 2:53:56

Guest appearances
- Maria Schell as Maria; Jason Robards as Robert Jordan; Maureen Stapleton as Pilar

Episode chronology
← Previous "Made in Japan"	Next → "A Trip To Paradise"

"For Whom the Bell Tolls" was an American television play broadcast in two parts on March 12 and March 19, 1959, as part of the CBS television series, Playhouse 90. It is a television adaptation of the 1940 novel by Ernest Hemingway. John Frankenheimer was the director. The cast included Jason Robards, Maria Schell, and Maureen Stapleton.

== Plot ==
=== Part 1, Act I ===
The play begins in Madrid in 1937 during the Spanish Civil War. Madrid is under bombardment by the Fascist air force. General Golz assigns Robert Jordan, an American volunteer and demolitions expert, to blow a bridge so that the Fascist forces cannot cross.

Anselmo assists Jordan in scouting the bridge. He introduces Jordan to a band of Republican guerrillas led by Pablo. The group also includes the gypsy Rafael, the beautiful young Maria, and Pablo's wife Pilar. Jordan stays with Pablo's band of guerrillas at their camp in a cave in the mountains. Pablo is opposed to blowing up the bridge. He views the mission as too risky. Pilar and others in Pablo's band support Jordan's mission. Pilar accuses Pablo of being a lazy, drunken coward. Rafael advises Jordan to kill Pablo for the sake of the mission.

=== Part 1, Act II ===
Jordan falls in love with Maria. Maria has never loved or kissed, but she has been raped by several men, when she was a prisoner of the fascists. Pilar assumes command of the guerrillas from Pablo. Jordan and Maria travel together to visit another guerrilla leader El Sordo.

=== Part 1, Act III ===
Jordan and Pablo provoke each other. Pablo also fights with Agustin. Pilar gives her blessing to the killing of Pablo. The guerrillas also support Pablo's killing. Having overheard the discussion about killing him, Pablo claims he now supports the raid on the bridge.

Jordan kills a fascist cavalry soldier. Pablo rides the horse out of the camp. A cavalry unit passes through and follows the tracks laid by Pablo away from the camp.

=== Part 2, Act I ===
Agustin tells Jordan that he has also cared for Maria. If he did not believe that Jordan cared for Maria, Agustin would have killed Jordan. Jordan hears the sounds and sees lights from a battle in the distance. The fascists are massacring El Sordo and his men, but Jordan refuses to allow Agustin to go to El Sordo's aid.

The fascists begin moving a whole division, including tanks and artillery, across the bridge. Jordan sends Andres with a message to Gen. Golz, warning of the fascist troop movement. The attack on the bridge is planned for the next day. Jordan does not want to talk of the next day's danger. He wants only to enjoy the night with Maria. They talk of plans for the future. Maria tells Jordan of the execution of her parents and of her abuse by the fascists. Jordan vows to kill many fascists the next day to avenge Maria. He declares that Maria is his wife.

=== Part 2, Act II ===
Pilar awakens Jordan in the middle of the night. Pablo has fled the camp, taking the detonators with him. Pilar feels responsible for having slept when she was supposed to be guarding the explosives. Jordan devises a plan to detonate the dynamite with grenades. Pablo returns and claims he had a moment of weakness in the night. He now wants to help and has recruited five men to assist in the assault. Pilar believes Pablo and restores command of the unit to him.

An aerial bombardment from the Republican forces begins, and the guerrillas launch their assault on the bridge. Jordan plants the explosives.

=== Part 2, Act III ===
Fascist reinforcements arrive at the bridge. Pablo leads his men bravely into combat, as Jordan continues to plant explosives under the bridge. Jordan blows the bridge as fascist tanks approach. Anselmo is killed. As Jordan and the guerrillas retreat, they come under heavy fire from fascists on the other side of the gorge. Jordan is shot in the leg and abdomen. Jordan says goodbye to Maria. Maria begs to stay with Jordan, but he sends her away with Pablo and Pilar. Jordan struggles to maintain consciousness and provides covering fire as the others retreat.

== Cast ==
The cast includes performances by the following.

- Maria Schell as Maria
- Jason Robards as Robert Jordan
- Maureen Stapleton as Pilar
- Nehemiah Persoff as Pablo
- Steven Hill as Agustin
- Eli Wallach as Rafael
- Vladimir Sokoloff as Anselmo
- Herbert Berghof as Gen. Golz
- Milton Selzer as Fernando
- Joseph Bernard as Primitivo
- Sydney Pollack as Andres
- Nicholas Colasanto as Eladio

== Production ==
Fred Coe was the producer and John Frankenheimer the director. The settings were designed by Walter Scott Herndon. The music was composed and conducted by Eugene Cines.

The program was recorded on videotape and aired on March 12 and 19, 1959, as part of the CBS television series, Playhouse 90. It was staged in New York City to accommodate Jason Robards. It was "television's first three-hour, two-part drama."

A. E. Hotchner wrote the teleplay as an adaptation of Ernest Hemingway's novel of the same name. Hotchner was personal friends with Hemingway and later wrote his biography, Papa Hemingway. Hotchner adapted For Whom the Bell Tolls for television with Hemingway's blessing. Hotchner was traveling with Hemingway when Part 2 aired. Hemingway stopped at a "flea-bitten little motel" and watched Part 2 with Hotchner holding the television's "rabbit ears" to maintain the reception. At the conclusion of the program, Hemingway called Robards and Schell to tell them "how terrific he thought it was."

Hotchner also later recalled a humorous incident during the filming. Because Robards, Eli Wallach, and Maureen Stapleton were all appearing in Broadway plays, much of the filming was done overnight between 11 p.m. and 3 a.m. Robards and Stapleton were heavy drinkers at the time, and Frankenheimer struggled to keep them sober. On the night they filmed the confrontation between Jordan and Pablo, both Robards and Stapleton were visibly intoxicated. Nehemiah Persoff's character, on the other hand, was supposed to be drunk, but Persoff was not exhibiting the appropriate level of inebriation. An exasperated Frankenheimer exploded: "I got two drunks who should be sober and one guy sober who should be drunk!" Frankenheimer fed scotch to Persoff and, as CBS executives arrived to watch the filming, they saw "three drunken actors staggering around a cave that reeked of booze, garbling their lines, missing their cues, getting in one another's way, but enjoying themselves as only drunks can."

The budget blew out from $300,000 to $500,000.

== Reception ==
Associated Press television writer Charles Mercer called it "the finest drama of the current television season." He praised the cast for developing their roles "compellingly and creatively and wrote that the final battle scene was "infused with a clarity and authenticity rarely achieved in the medium."

UPI television critic William Ewald found the first part stiff, but wrote that the second part was "magnificent", a production with "a splendor, a luster, that turned the 90 minutes into one of TV's most distinguished offerings." He singled out Maria Schell's five-minute, soft-voiced description of the horrors she experienced while a prisoner of the fascists as "one of the most moving scenes I've ever seen on the little tube."

After watching the first part, Jack Gould of The New York Times called it "one of the television medium's finer accomplishments." After the second part, Gould described the climactic battle scenes as "a technical tour de force in experimental video production." He also praised the graphic and moving depiction of combat and Frankenheimer's "highly imaginative" direction.

After watching part one, television critic John Crosby gave a mixed review. He praised the opening scene between Robards and Berghof as a depiction of "true Hemingway characters" in roles that were "concise, hard-bitten, masculine, tight as a fiddle string and yet with an undercurrent of rippling male humor." While he felt the overall production fell short, he called it "an epochal try."

== Awards ==
Nehemiah Persoff won the Sylvania Award for outstanding performance by an actor in a supporting role. The program also received Sylvania Award nominations as the best dramatic program of the year and for Maria Schell for outstanding performance by an actress in a starring role.
