= Alexandra Wager =

American actress

- Occupation: Actress
- Parent: Michael Wager

Alexandra Wager is an American former child actress.

Wager is the daughter of actor Michael Wager. She made her television debut in March 1958, at age seven, in role of Mimi in the NBC production of 'Mrs. McThing, playing opposite Helen Hayes.

Wager's second television appearance was as Flora in NBC's October 1959 production of The Turn of the Screw, playing opposite Ingrid Bergman. She was nominated at the 1959 Sylvania Television Awards for outstanding performance by an actress in a supporting role, ultimately losing to Colleen Dewhurst.

In March 1960, at age nine, she narrated Prokofiev's "Peter and the Wolf" with Leonard Bernstein conducting in a CBS broadcast of the New York Philharmonic's Young People's Concerts."
