= The Day Before Atlanta =

- Playhouse 90 episode
- Episode no.: Season 3 Episode 27
- Directed by: Ralph Nelson
- Written by: John Gay
- Original air date: April 9, 1959
- Running time: 1:27

Guest appearances
- Jack Warden as Sgt. Jubal Banks; Timmy Everett as Doug Hooker; Betty Lou Keim as Carolyn Claybourne

Episode chronology
← Previous "In Lonely Expectation"	Next → "Judgment at Nuremberg"

"The Day Before Atlanta" is an American television play broadcast on April 9, 1959, as part of the CBS television series, Playhouse 90. The cast is led by Jack Warden. Ralph Nelson is the director and John Gay the writer.

== Plot ==
During the American Civil War, a Union scouting party kills a man and his teenage son as they attempt to defend their plantation. A soldier discovers a young girl hiding inside the mansion.

== Cast ==
The cast includes the following.

- Jack Warden as Sgt. Jubal Banks
- Timmy Everett as Doug Hooker
- Betty Lou Keim as Carolyn Claybourne
- Clu Gulager as Zach Toombs
- Dabbs Greer as Clayton Beard
- Clinton Sundberg as Matthew Claybourne
- Gavin Gordon as Slade Simpson
- Musa Williams as Esther
- Joel Fluellen as Jonathan
- William Schallert as Major Barnes
- Tom McKee as General McPherson
- Roy Jenson as the Lieutenant
- Jayson Wingreen as Ralph Fletcher
- Nolan Leary as Edwin
- Donald Harrison as Tom

== Production ==
The program aired on April 9, 1959, on the CBS television series Playhouse 90. John Gay was the writer and Ralph Nelson the director.
