= The Moon and Sixpence =

1919 novel by W Somerset Maugham

- Cover of the first UK edition
- Author: William Somerset Maugham
- Language: English
- Genre: Biographical novel
- Publisher: William Heinemann
- Publication date: 15 April 1919
- Publication place: United Kingdom
- Media type: Print (hardback & paperback)
- Pages: 263 pp
- OCLC: 22207227
- Dewey Decimal: 823.912
- LC Class: PR6025.A86 M6
- Preceded by: Of Human Bondage
- Followed by: The Painted Veil
- Text: The Moon and Sixpence at Wikisource

The Moon and Sixpence is a novel by Somerset Maugham, first published on 15 April 1919. It is told in episodic form by a first-person narrator providing a series of glimpses into the mind and soul of the central character, Charles Strickland, a middle-aged English stockbroker, who abandons his wife and children abruptly to pursue his desire to become an artist. The story is, in part, based on the life of the painter Paul Gauguin.

== Plot summary ==
The book is written largely from the point of view of the narrator, a young, aspiring writer and playwright in London. Certain chapters entirely comprise accounts of other characters' activities, which the narrator recalls from memory, selectively editing or elaborating on things that were said, particularly by Strickland, because Strickland, according to the narrator, has a poor ability to express himself. The narrator first becomes acquainted with Strickland's wife at literary parties and later meets Strickland himself, who appears to be an unremarkable businessman with no interest in his wife's literary or artistic tastes.

Strickland is a well-off, middle-class stockbroker in London, in the late 19th or early 20th century. Early in the novel, he leaves his wife and children and goes to Paris. The narrator enters directly into the story at that point, when he is asked by Mrs. Strickland to go to Paris and talk with her husband. Strickland lives a destitute but defiantly contented life there as a painter, lodging in run-down hotels and falling prey to both illness and hunger. In his drive to express through his art what appears to continually possess and compel him on the inside, he cares nothing for physical comfort and is indifferent to his surroundings. He is helped and supported by a commercially successful but hackneyed Dutch painter, Dirk Stroeve, coincidentally, also an old friend of the narrator, who recognises Strickland's genius as a painter. After helping Strickland recover from a life-threatening illness, Stroeve is repaid by having his wife, Blanche, abandon him for Strickland. Strickland later discards the wife, because all he really wanted from Blanche was for her to be a model to paint, not a serious companion. It is hinted in the novel that he indicated that to her, but she took the risk anyway. Blanche then dies by suicide. She is another human casualty in Strickland's single-minded pursuit of art and beauty, the first casualties being his own established life, and those of his wife and children.

After the Paris episode, the story continues in Tahiti. Strickland has already died, and the narrator attempts to piece together his life there from recollections of others. He finds that Strickland had taken up with a native woman, had two children by her (one of whom died), and started painting prolifically. We learn that Strickland had settled for a short while in the French port of Marseille before traveling to Tahiti, where he lived for a few years before dying of leprosy. Strickland left behind numerous paintings, but his magnum opus, which he painted on the walls of his hut before losing his sight to leprosy, was burnt by his wife after his death, as per his dying orders.

== Inspiration ==
The Moon and Sixpence is not, of course, a life of Paul Gauguin in the form of fiction. It is founded on what I had heard about him, but I used only the main facts of his story and for the rest trusted to such gifts of invention as I was fortunate enough to possess.

The life of the French artist Paul Gauguin is the inspiration for the story, but the character of Strickland as a solitary, sociopathic, and destructive genius is more related to a mythological version of Gauguin's life, which the artist himself developed and promoted, than the actual course of his life. The real Gauguin was a participant in the artistic developments in France in the 1880s, exhibiting his work regularly with the Impressionists, and being a friend and collaborator with many artists. Gauguin did work as a stockbroker, did leave his wife and family to devote his life to art, and did leave Europe for Tahiti to pursue his career. However, none of that happened in the brutal way of the novel's character. Maugham took inspiration from the published writings about Gauguin available at the time, as well as personal experience living among the artistic community in Paris in 1904, and a visit to Tahiti in 1914.

Strickland is created as an extreme version of the "modern artist as 'genius'", who is indifferent and frequently hostile to the people around him.

Writing in 1953, Maugham described the idea for the book as arising during a year that he spent living in Paris in 1904:

"...I met men who had known him and worked with him at Pont-Aven. I heard much about him. It occurred to me that there was in what I was told the subject of a novel."

The idea remained in his mind for ten years, until a visit to Tahiti in 1914, where Maugham was able to meet people who had known Gauguin, inspired him to start writing. The critic Amy Dickson examines the relationship between Gauguin and Strickland. She contrasts the novel's description of Strickland, which is that "his faults are accepted as the necessary complement of his merits ... but one thing can never be doubtful, and that is that he had genius", with Gauguin's description of himself:

"I am an artist and you are right, you're not mad, I am a great artist and I know it. It's because I know it that I have endured such sufferings. To have done otherwise I would consider myself a brigand—which is what many people think I am."

Dickson sums up the novel as follows:

"Maugham was fascinated by the impact of the arrival of modernism from Europe on an insular British consciousness and the emergence of the cult of the modernist artist-genius—The Moon and Sixpence is at once a satire of Edwardian mores and a Gauguin biography."

== Title ==
According to some sources, the title, the meaning of which is not explicitly revealed in the book, was taken from a review in The Times Literary Supplement of Maugham's novel Of Human Bondage, in which the novel's protagonist, Philip Carey, is described as being "so busy yearning for the moon that he never saw the sixpence at his feet." According to a 1956 letter from Maugham, "If you look on the ground in search of a sixpence, you don't look up, and so miss the moon." Maugham's title echoes the description of Gauguin by his contemporary biographer, Meier-Graefe (1908): "He [Gauguin] may be charged with having always wanted something else."

== Adaptations ==
The book was made into a stage play in 1925 at the New Theatre, with Henry Ainley as Strickland and Eileen Sharp as Ata. A film of the same name directed and written by Albert Lewin, was released in 1942, starring George Sanders as Charles Strickland.

The novel served as the basis for a 1957 opera, also titled The Moon and Sixpence, by John Gardner to a libretto by Patrick Terry which premiered at Sadlers Wells.

S Lee Pogostin adapted it for American TV in 1959. That production, The Moon and Sixpence (1959), starred Laurence Olivier, with Hume Cronyn and Jessica Tandy in supporting roles.

== See also ==
- Mario Vargas Llosa's 2003 novel The Way to Paradise is also based on Paul Gauguin's life.
