= In Lonely Expectation =

- Playhouse 90 episode
- Episode no.: Season 3 Episode 26
- Directed by: Franklin Schaffner
- Written by: Mayo Simon
- Original air date: April 2, 1959
- Running time: 1:29

Guest appearances
- Diane Baker as Sheila; Susan Harrison as P.J.; Philip Abbott as Leonard Cass

Episode chronology
| ← Previous "A Trip to Paradise" | Next → "The Day Before Atlanta" |

"In Lonely Expectation" is an American television play broadcast on April 2, 1959 as part of the CBS television series, Playhouse 90. The cast is led by Diane Baker. Franklin Schaffner was the director and Mayo Simon the writer.

== Plot ==
A woman converts a house into a home for unwed mothers and tries to help a teenage girl decide whether to keep her child or agree to an adoption.

== Cast ==
The cast includes the following.

- Diane Baker as Sheila
- Susan Harrison as P.J.
- Philip Abbott as Leonard Cass
- Kathleen Maguire as Miss Schoengren
- Beverly Washburn as Betty Anne
- Joanne Linville as June
- Buzz Martin as Billy
- Jenny Maxwell as Bo
- Virginia Kaye as Mrs. Runnells
- Mary Gregory as Mrs. Watkins
- Carolyn Horn as Miss Talbot
- Connie Davis as P.J.'s Mother
- Phyllis Standish as Carol
- Kathleen O'Malley as Nurse
- Sally Kellerman as Receptionist
- Meg Wyllie as Sewing Teacher

== Production ==
The program aired on April 2, 1959, on the CBS television series Playhouse 90. Mayo Simon was the writer and Franklin Schaffner the director.
