= Therese Lewis =

American screenwriter

- Born: September 26, 1911; Cincinnati, Ohio, USA
- Died: June 28, 1984 (aged 72); New York City, New York, USA
- Occupation(s): Screenwriter, author, producer
- Spouse: Hubbell Robinson (div.)

Therese Lewis (1911-1984) was an American screenwriter, author, and producer who worked in radio, film, and television in the 1940s up through the 1960s.

== Biography ==
Originally intending to be an actress, Lewis began her career as a player in the Cincinnati Stuart Walker Company before working in publicity, writing commercials, and then working as a story editor.

She moved into radio when she began producing and editing Helen Hayes' Sunday radio program while writing articles for publications like Town and Country. She eventually forged a successful career for herself as a film and television writer before becoming a producer on the '60s TV soap Peyton Place. She also served as script editor on the program NBC's Television Playhouse.

She married Hubbell Robinson, a CBS executive she met while working in radio, in 1940. After their divorce in the early 1950s, she dated actor Alexander Kirkland.

She died of emphysema in New York City in 1984.

== Selected filmography ==
As a producer:

- Peyton Place (1964–1965)

As a writer:

- Goodyear Playhouse (TV, 1957 episode "Rumblin' Galleries")
- Matinee Theatre (TV, 1956 episode "A Man and a Maid")
- Schlitz Playhouse (TV, 1953 episodes "The Perfect Secretary" and "The Governess")
- Robert Montgomery Presents (TV, 1953 episode "The Wind Cannot Read")
- What a Woman! (1943)
