= The Art Carney Special =

The Art Carney Special is a comedy television series starting Art Carney as Axel Heist that aired on NBC from 1959 until 1961. The show earned the Primetime Emmy Award for Outstanding Comedy Series (then known as Outstanding Program Achievement in the Field of Humor) at the 12th Primetime Emmy Awards.
