= Startime (American TV series) =

1959 American anthology TV series

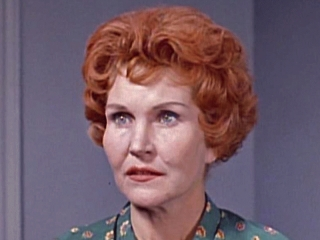
- Eve McVeagh in "Incident at a Corner" directed by Alfred Hitchcock
- Also known as: Ford Startime – TV's Finest Hour; Lincoln-Mercury Startime
- Genre: Drama/comedy/music anthology
- Country of origin: United States
- No. of seasons: 1
- No. of episodes: 33 episodes

Production
- Running time: 60/90 minutes
- Production companies: Hubbell Robinson Productions, Shamley Productions

Original release
- Network: NBC
- Release: October 6, 1959 – May 31, 1960

Startime is an anthology show of drama, comedy, and variety, and was one of the first American television shows broadcast in color. The program was aired Tuesday nights in the United States on the NBC network in the 1959–60 season.

== Summary ==
The show was known as either Ford Startime—TV's Finest Hour or Lincoln–Mercury Startime, depending on which division of the Ford Motor Company was presenting commercials within that show. The contents varied from week to week – dramas, musical comedies, and variety shows were all presented.

The show was always broadcast on Tuesday nights. Initially, from the premiere through the end of 1959, the show was broadcast 9:30–10:30 PM (EST) - but, starting on January 5, 1960, the show was broadcast 8:30–9:30 PM (EST). Furthermore, some of the shows first broadcast in 1959 were ninety minutes long, continuing to 11 PM.

Dean Martin hosted two variety episodes within this series and later began his own variety show. Mitch Miller had "Sing Along with Mitch" on May 24, 1960, which led to his own show of the same name beginning in 1961.

The February 23, 1960, episode, "Talent Scouts", was an adaptation of Arthur Godfrey's Talent Scouts, which had been broadcast on CBS.

=== Production ===
Hubbell Robinson was the show's producer.

The Music Corporation of America (MCA), under Lew Wasserman, was the "packager" of the series, providing stars who would not ordinarily appear on American television, such as Alec Guinness and Rex Harrison at reduced rates, in exchange for an overall packaging fee for the entire series paid to MCA. Wasserman was also the agent for Alfred Hitchcock, who directed one Startime episode, "Incident at a Corner" (aired April 5, 1960).

For example, Ingrid Bergman, who at that time commanded a salary of $750,000 per film, and who had never appeared in a dramatic role on American television, was paid $100,000 for her role in Startime's presentation of The Turn of the Screw. Though MCA only received $10,000 (10% of Bergman's salary) as commission, the company also received, as packager, 10% of the entire production schedule of the entire Startime season (which was $7.24 million). In other words, MCA received $724,000 solely for providing to Startime the services of stars such as Bergman, in addition to the commissions for each individual star.

NBC had to pay a royalty fee to CBS in order to present the "Talent Scouts" episode.

Ford ended the series on May 31, 1960, rather than continuing through the originally planned June 28, 1960, ending. The network said it was cutting four episodes "... so that Ford can go into an extensive summer schedule." The New York Times reported that essentially the reallocation of advertising money enabled Ford to purchase one-third sponsorship of Laramie and Riverboat, both of which were on NBC. The Times' article said, "Judging from the general reaction of viewers, 'Startime' failed to live up to the billing ('TV's Finest Hour') assigned to it by N. B. C. and the sponsor." The article also noted that Robinson was no longer actively involved with Startime.

The initial competition for Startime included The Red Skelton Show on CBS. Although NBC executives thought that Startime's budget and stars might draw more viewers than Skelton's show, the comedian commented that the ratings indicated otherwise, with his show in the top 10, while Startime was "down around 100". Startime was moved to an hour earlier time slot in January 1960, but it was no more successful.

== Episodes ==
No.	Title	Running time	Original release date
1	"The Wonderful World of Entertainment"	60 minutes	October 6, 1959
Kirk Browning and Bob Fosse (also credited as choreographer) directed this variety show, written by Larry Gelbart, and starring Polly Bergen, Maurice Chevalier, Eddie Foy, Jr., Ernie Kovacs, Arthur O'Connell, Jack Paar, Rosalind Russell, and Kate Smith.
2	"The Jazz Singer"	60 minutes	October 13, 1959
Jerry Lewis starred in this remake of the Al Jolson original as a young man who wants to be a nightclub comic, but whose father wants him to become a cantor. Eduard Franz reprised the aged cantor's role he had played seven years before in the 1952 film version of the Jolson film. Also starring were Anna Maria Alberghetti, Barry Gordon, Molly Picon, and Alan Reed.
3	"The Turn of the Screw"	90 minutes	October 20, 1959
Ingrid Bergman starred as the governess in this drama directed by John Frankenheimer, and adapted by James Costigan from the Henry James novel.
4	"The Secret World of Kids"	60 minutes	October 27, 1959
Art Linkletter hosted this variety show based on his book of the same name. In addition to a Kids Say the Darndest Things segment, there were skits, musical performances and dancing, with child actors Angela Cartwright, Jon Provost, and Teddy Rooney (son of Mickey Rooney), with animal actors Lassie and Jerry the chimpanzee, and with Hollywood stalwarts Ed Wynn and Vincent Price. The show ended with an interview with then-Vice-President of the United States Richard M. Nixon and his mother, about Richard Nixon's childhood.
5	"The Dean Martin Variety Show"	60 minutes	November 3, 1959
Dean Martin hosted this variety show, with guests Frank Sinatra and Mickey Rooney.
6	"The Wicked Scheme of Jebal Deeks"	60 minutes	November 10, 1959
Alec Guinness starred in this drama about a middle-aged bank employee who resents having worked for over twenty years at the same job without a promotion.
7	"The Big Time"	60 minutes	November 17, 1959
George Burns, playing himself, with (all playing themselves) Jack Benny, Eddie Cantor, Bobby Darin, George Jessel, and The Kingston Trio, starred in this comedy/musical reliving the early days of vaudeville.
8	"Merman on Broadway"	60 minutes	November 24, 1959
Ethel Merman sang a musical review of her career on Broadway, with guests Tab Hunter, Fess Parker, and Tom Poston, covering songs ranging from her debut in 1930 right up to her then-current starring role in Gypsy.
9	"Something Special"	60 minutes	December 1, 1959
Red Buttons starred in this comedy about a country boy who has come to the city to meet a woman he might marry.
10	"My Three Angels"	90 minutes	December 8, 1959
Walter Slezak, George Grizzard, and Barry Sullivan starred in this comedy about three Devil's Island convicts who befriend the prison's storekeeper.
11	"Cindy's Fella"	60 minutes	December 15, 1959
James Stewart, Lois Smith, and George Gobel starred in this adaption of the Cinderella fairy tale set in the 19th century American West, originally presented as an episode on Stewart's 1953-54 radio show "The Six Shooter".
12	"Christmas Startime"	60 minutes	December 22, 1959
This musical Christmas special featured conductor/composer Leonard Bernstein, and opera singers Marian Anderson, Lee Venora, Charles Bressler, Russell Oberlin, and Betty Allen. The host was Joseph N. Welch, best known as the attorney representing the Army in the Joseph McCarthy hearings.
13	"Meet Cyd Charisse"	60 minutes	December 29, 1959
Dancer Cyd Charisse starred in this revue with Eve Arden, and fellow dancers Tony Martin and James Mitchell.
14	"The Man"	60 minutes	January 5, 1960
Thelma Ritter starred in this drama as a widow terrorized by a handyman played by Audie Murphy. Based on the Mel Dinelli play of the same name, it had been produced twice before on the radio, once in 1945 with Frank Sinatra and Agnes Moorehead, and again in 1949 with Gene Kelly and Ethel Barrymore.
15	"The Dean Martin Variety Show (II)"	60 minutes	January 12, 1960
Dean Martin hosted another variety show, this one with actress Nanette Fabray, pianist André Previn, and 1950s pop-singer Fabian.
16	"Crime, Inc."	60 minutes	January 19, 1960
Lloyd Nolan narrated this docu-drama about organized crime in the United States from 1900 through 1960.
17	"The Wonderful World of Jack Paar"	60 minutes	January 26, 1960
Jack Paar hosted this music and comedy special exploring the "World of Paar", with, among others, comedians Jonathan Winters and Alice Pearce.
18	"The Greatest Man Alive"	60 minutes	February 2, 1960
Ed Wynn and Bert Lahr starred in this black comedy about a solitary widower who, in order to place some attention on his unnoticed life, decides to commit suicide by hanging himself, only to be thwarted by well-meaning strangers.
19	"The Swingin' Years"	60 minutes	February 9, 1960
This special of Big Band swing music was hosted by Ronald Reagan, and featured, among others, Gene Krupa and his Drum Boogie, Tex Beneke and The Modernaires singing Chattanooga Choo Choo, Count Basie and His Orchestra doing One O'Clock Jump, and Woody Herman and The Herd performing Caldonia.
20	"Closed Set"	60 minutes	February 16, 1960
Joan Fontaine and John Ireland starred in this behind-the-scenes drama about a famous Hollywood actress who wants to break out of her stereotypical roles and do a "quality film". Agnes Moorehead also starred.
21	"The Talent Scouts Program"	60 minutes	February 23, 1960
Dave Garroway hosted this musical variety showcase, where well-known stars (among others, Hugh Downs, Maureen O'Hara, Richard Rodgers and Joan Crawford) introduced young new stars (among them, Colleen Dewhurst, introduced by Crawford).
22	"Jeff McCleod, the Last Reb"	60 minutes	March 1, 1960
Robert Horton, Anne Francis, and Ricardo Montalbán starred in a war story set in the closing days of the American Civil War, where an isolated conflict between Union and Confederate forces continues on for days, even after they all know the war is officially over.
23	"The Swingin' Singin' Years"	60 minutes	March 8, 1960
Ronald Reagan again was the host for another Startime episode of Big Band swing music. Among the musicians appearing were Dinah Washington singing a medley (What a Difference a Day Made / Making Whoopee), Woody Herman (again), and Jo Stafford, Louis Jordan, and Stan Kenton.
24	"Academy Award Songs"	60 minutes	March 15, 1960
Jane Wyman hosted this musical variety special of songs nominated in the Best Song category for the 1959 Academy Awards, and of other Academy Award winning songs from years past.
25	"Dear Arthur"	60 minutes	March 22, 1960
Rex Harrison starred in this drama, adapted by Gore Vidal from the story by P. G. Wodehouse based on the play by Ferenc Molnár, about a con-man at work on the modern-day French Riveria.
26	"The Young Juggler"	60 minutes	March 29, 1960
Tony Curtis starred in and produced this adaptation of The Juggler of Notre Dame, about a young man in a French monastery who has no gift to place before the statue of the Holy Virgin Mary, other than his juggling.
27	"Incident at a Corner"	60 minutes	April 5, 1960
Alfred Hitchcock directed and produced this modern-day drama of accusation, suspicion, and fear involving a school crossing guard (Paul Hartman) in a small American town. Among the actors were George Peppard, Jack Albertson, Eve McVeagh, and Vera Miles.
28	"Well, What About You?"	60 minutes	April 19, 1960
Eddie Albert hosted this non-partisan presentation on the obligation and privilege of voting in the upcoming American election. Politicians Adlai Stevenson, Nelson Rockefeller, John F. Kennedy, and Richard M. Nixon gave speeches, and entertainers Polly Bergen and Marian Andersen, as well as various US military bands and choirs, performed.
29	"Soldiers in Greasepaint"	60 minutes	April 26, 1960
Bob Crosby hosted this musical salute to the USO, the United Services Organization, known for providing free entertainment and recreation to American servicemen stationed overseas.
30	"Fun Fair"	60 minutes	May 3, 1960
Celeste Holm hosted this salute to the American county fair, with guests Peter Palmer (best known for his Broadway portrayal of Li'l Abner), singer Jaye P. Morgan, actress Margaret Hamilton, and Cliff Arquette (in his country bumpkin persona Charley Weaver), doing skits, songs and dances.
31	"Tennessee Ernie Ford Meets King Arthur"	60 minutes	May 10, 1960
Tennessee Ernie Ford starred in this remake of Mark Twain's A Connecticut Yankee in King Arthur's Court. John Dehner narrated; Alan Mowbray played King Arthur, and Carl Ballantine played Merlin; also in the cast were Vincent Price and Alan Young.
32	"The Mitch Miller Variety Show"	60 minutes	May 24, 1960
Mitch Miller hosted this musical performance show, an immediate precursor to his NBC network show Sing Along With Mitch that premiered the following year. Leslie Uggams appeared as a singer.
33	"The Nanette Fabray Show, or Help Me, Aphrodite"	60 minutes	May 31, 1960
Nanette Fabray starred in this musical about a diner waitress who wants to be as famous as such legendary women of the past as Marie Antoinette and Pocahantas. Also in the cast were Jean-Pierre Aumont, Stubby Kaye, and Tony Randall.

== Nominations and awards ==
Alec Guinness, playing the lead role in The Wicked Scheme of Jebal Deeks, received a nomination in the Outstanding Single Performance by an Actor category in the 12th Primetime Emmy Awards. He lost to Laurence Olivier in The Moon and Sixpence.

== Critical response ==
A review of the episode "The Man" in The New York Times said that Audie Murphy "never seemed menacing or calculating" in the role of an "unbalanced young man" and that Thelma Ritter was "quite wasted" in her widow's role. Critic Jack Gould described the TV adaptation as "especially flat and thin."

== Canadian version ==
From October 6, 1959 through June 28, 1960, Ford of Canada broadcast, in the Tuesday 9–11 PM timeslot, on the CBC network in Canada, a show also called Ford Startime, presenting many of the same shows as the American version, alternating with Canadian-produced shows, including adaptions of Arthur Miller's The Crucible (starring Leslie Nielsen), Henrik Ibsen's An Enemy of the People, Oscar Wilde's The Importance of Being Earnest, and James Thurber's The Thirteen Clocks.

== See also ==
- Ford Theatre
- Ford Festival
- The Ford Show
- Ford Star Jubilee
