= The Moon and Sixpence (1959 film) =

1959 American television movie

- Laurence Olivier in leprosy makeup
- Based on: The Moon and Sixpence by Somerset Maugham
- Written by: S. Lee Pogostin
- Directed by: Robert Mulligan
- Starring: Laurence Olivier; Hume Cronyn; Jessica Tandy

Production
- Producer: David Susskind
- Running time: 90 minutes

Original release
- Network: NBC
- Release: October 30, 1959

The Moon and Sixpence is an American television movie that was broadcast on NBC on October 30, 1959. The production, starring Laurence Olivier, was adapted by S. Lee Pogostin from the novel by Somerset Maugham. The production won multiple Emmy and Sylvania Awards, including awards for Olivier's acting, Pogostin's adaptation, and Robert Mulligan's direction.

== Plot ==
A successful stockbroker leaves his family in middle age to become an artist. His wife (played by Geraldine Fitzgerald) responds by committing suicide. In Paris, he befriends another artist (played by Hume Cronyn), then has an affair with his friend's wife (played by Jessica Tandy), destroying their marriage. He settles in Tahiti where he marries a native woman (played by Jean Marsh) and develops leprosy.

== Cast ==
The following performers appeared in the movie:

- Laurence Olivier as Charles Strickland
- Geraldine Fitzgerald as Amy Strickland
- Hume Cronyn as Dirk Stroeve
- Jessica Tandy as Blanche Stroeve
- Denholm Elliott as The Writer
- Judith Anderson as Tiare
- Jean Marsh as Ata
- Cyril Cusack as Dr. Coutras
- Murray Matheson

== Production ==
The 90-minute movie was produced in December 1958 and recorded on color videotape. David Susskind was the producer and Robert Mulligan the director. It was sponsored by RCA and used in advertising for color television sets.

The film is based on Somerset Maugham's 1919 novel, The Moon and Sixpence. The novel had previously been adapted into a stage play in 1925, a feature film in 1942, and an opera in 1957. The television adaptation was written by S. Lee Pogostin.

The production was Laurence Olivier's debut on American television. Olivier won Emmy and Sylvania Awards for his performance, which required him to portray the transformation of the protagonist from a timorous London stockbroker to a rude Parisian artist and eventually a noble leper in Tahiti.

Makeup artist Dick Smith was responsible for Olivier's makeup after the character developed leprosy. Olivier noted the extreme makeup reflecting the disfigurement of his character's face "does the acting for me." Smith and Olivier later worked together again on Marathon Man (1976).

== Reception ==
=== Critics ===
In The New York Times, Jack Gould called Olivier's performance "a work of towering accomplishment". He also wrote that the "completely arresting" production proved "that TV can achieve glorious heights if its creative people are afforded free rein."

In the New York Herald-Tribune, Marie Torre called it "the closest thing to dramatic perfection ever known on television." She also wrote that Olivier's performance "had a brilliance and magnetism unmatched in the annals of TV."

Bob Thomas of the Associated Press found Olivier's transformation from dullish London stockbroker to amoral painter to have been skillful and convincing. However, Thomas criticized the story as the "chronicle of a cad" with scene after scenes in which the protagonist mistreats his family and friends. Thomas also found any drama in the story to have been "largely muffled" by the narration-heavy adaptation and "talky" dialogue filled with "idle philosophizing". He also found much of the dialogue to be dated, including an exchange in which Olivier tells his Tahitian wife, "I shall beat you, you know," and she replies, "How else shall I know that thy love is true?"

=== Awards ===
The film won two Emmy Awards: for outstanding single performance by an actor (Laurence Olivier) and outstanding directorial achievement in drama (Mulligan). It was also nominated for outstanding program achievement in the field of drama but lost to Playhouse 90.

The film also won four Sylvania Television Awards: outstanding dramatic program; outstanding telecast; outstanding performance by an actor in a starring role (Olivier); and outstanding television adaptation (Pogostin).

David Susskind also received a Peabody Award for his production of "a drama of style and substance."
