= A Trip to Paradise (Playhouse 90) =

- Playhouse 90 episode
- Episode no.: Season 3 Episode 25
- Directed by: Buzz Kulik
- Written by: Adrian Spies
- Original air date: March 26, 1959

Guest appearances
- Susan Oliver as Ellie; Burt Brinkerhoff as Ray

Episode chronology
← Previous "For Whom the Bell Tolls"	Next → "In Lonely Expectation"

"A Trip to Paradise" is an American television play broadcast on March 26, 1959 as part of the CBS television series, Playhouse 90. The cast includes Susan Oliver and Burt Brinckerhoff. Buzz Kulik is the director, and the teleplay is written by Adrian Spies.

== Plot ==
A troubled teenage boy, Raymond Austin, meets a Ellie, a provocative teenage beauty who introduces him to delinquents and youthful "beatniks".

== Cast ==
The cast includes the following.

- Susan Oliver as Ellie
- Burt Brinckerhoff as Raymond Austin
- Martha Scott as Mrs. Austin
- Buddy Ebsen as Froelich
- Martin Balsam as Harkavy

== Production ==
The program was presented on March 26, 1959, on the CBS television series Playhouse 90. The teleplay was written by Adrian Spies.

== Reviews ==
Television critic William Ewald of the UPI called it "a neat little package", but "perhaps a little too neat, equipped as it was with pat ending and tidy moral, but it was a pretty rewarding excursion into the world of a teen-ager fumbling his way toward maturity."
