= Hubbell Robinson =

American broadcasting executive (1905–1974)

Hubbell Robinson (October 16, 1905 – September 4, 1974) was an American broadcasting executive who "was noted for his adeptness with programs both of artistic merit and of broad popular appeal." William Paley, who was chairman of CBS when Robinson worked in its television division, described Robinson as "the all-around man in our programming department."

== Early years ==
Born in Schenectady, New York, on October 16, 1905, Robinson was the son of Hubbell Robinson, a justice of the State Supreme Court. He graduated from Phillips Exeter Academy in 1923 and from Brown University, with a BA degree, in 1927.

== Career ==
In 1927 Robinson was drama critic for the film trade publication Exhibitors Herald, and in 1929 he was a reporter for the Schenectady Union Star and worked for the Knickerbocker Press. His first professional involvement with broadcasting came in 1930 when he was put in charge of the radio department (a new division) at the Young & Rubicam (Y&R) advertising agency. He was promoted to vice president and radio director at the agency in 1942. While he was at Y&R he created the soap opera The Second Mrs. Burton, for which he also wrote scripts. Like other Y&R radio executives, he produced other radio programs, wrote other scripts, and wrote commercials. His scripts included those for a program that featured weekly reports from the Byrd expedition at the Little America base in Antarctica in 1934.

Robinson went to the NBC Blue (later ABC) radio network in November 1944 and was vice president and program director there through 1945, when he resigned following Edward J. Noble's purchase of the outstanding shares of ABC stock. In 1946 he became national radio director at the Foote, Cone & Belding advertising agency as that agency for the first time consolidated its radio operations under one person.

He joined CBS in 1947 as vice president and director of programs, and became executive vice president of TV programs in 1956. Passed over twice for promotion, he left CBS in May 1959 following James T. Aubrey becoming executive vice president of the CBS video network, forming Hubbell Robinson Productions. That company's TV programs included Thriller and 87th Precinct. He returned to the network in 1962, becoming senior vice president for programming. He was executive producer of Climax!, Gunsmoke, I Love Lucy, Playhouse 90, The Phil Silvers Show, and other programs. A dispute with network president James T. Aubrey led to his leaving CBS again in 1963. After three years on his own, he returned to network TV in 1966 as executive in charge of production for ABC Stage 67. His other responsibilities at ABC included being executive producer of the series Crisis!.

Efforts by Robinson in the early 1960s led to increased opportunities for Black performers in TV shows. In particular, he wrote to producers suggesting that they be alert to more roles for Black people in TV shows, especially where professionals like attorneys, doctors, engineers, and teachers were portrayed.

== Other activities ==
From 1969 to 1972, Robinson was a film critic for a cable TV channel in New York City, and from 1971 to 1974 he was a contributing critic for Films in Review. He was a trustee of Brown University, and he was chairman of the National Academy of Television Arts and Sciences's quarterly publication. He completed an autobiography, Wanderer in the Wasteland, for publication by G. P. Putnam's Sons.

== Personal life and death ==
Robinson was married to writer Therese Lewis from 1940 until they divorced in 1948. On December 29, 1948, he married singer Margaret Whiting in Las Vegas. After he and Whiting were divorced, he married musical comedy star Vivienne Segal. He and Segal were legally separated in 1962. He had no children. He died of lung cancer on September 4, 1974, aged 68.

== Awards ==
- 1958 Emmy Award
- 1959 Emmy Award
- 1960 TV Digest Awards (2)
- 1962 Producers Guild Award
- 1967 Fame Award
- 1972 Television Academy's Salute Award
