= Atlantic Palace =

Building in Atlantic City, New Jersey

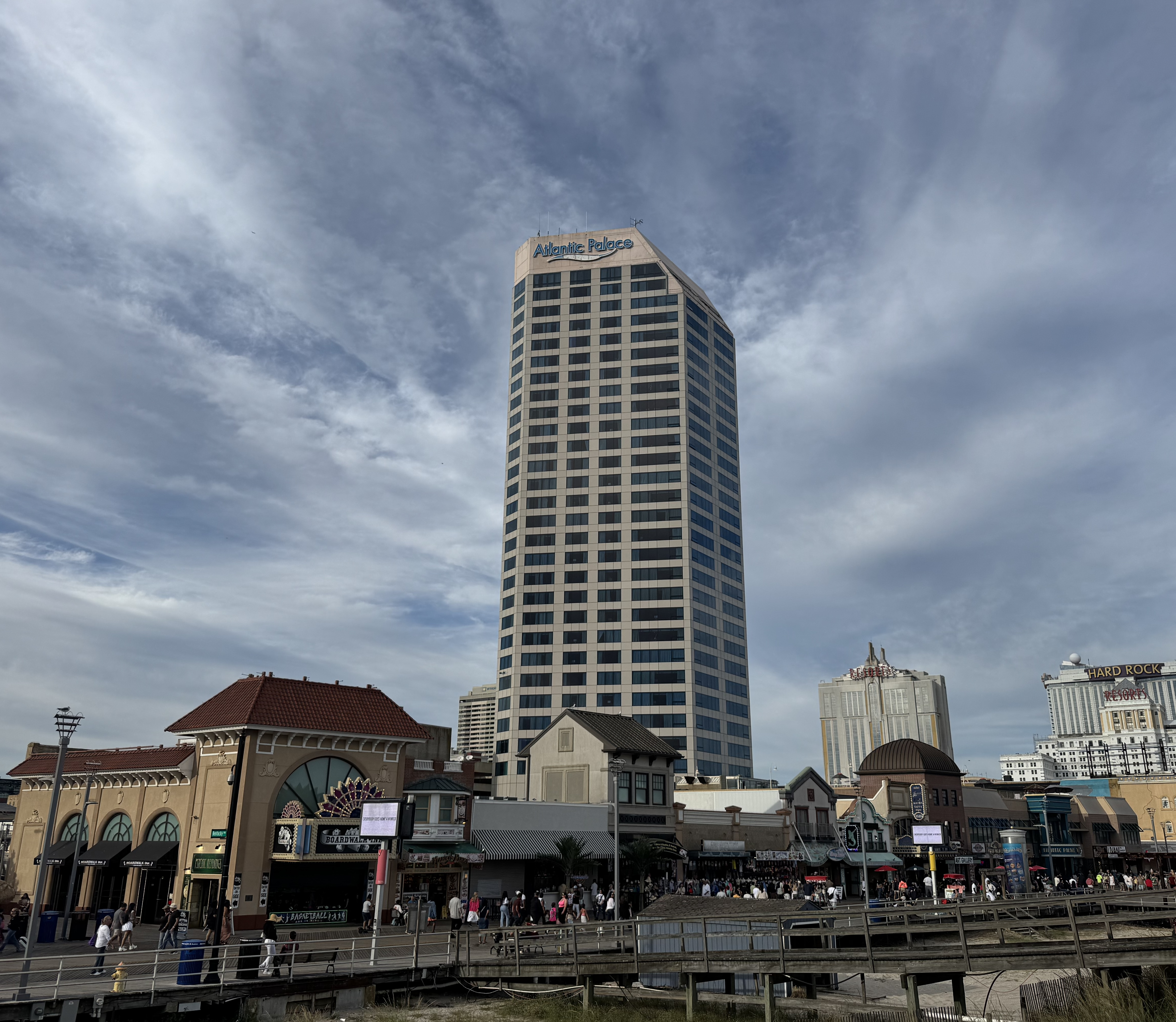
- Interactive map of the Atlantic Palace area

General information
- Location: Atlantic City, New Jersey, 1507 Boardwalk
- Coordinates: 39.357076°N 74.426589°W
- Opening: 1986
- Owner: Bluegreen Corporation; FantaSea Resorts

Technical details
- Floor count: 31

Design and construction
- Developer: United States Capital Corporation

Other information
- Number of rooms: 293

Website
- atlanticpalacesuites.com

The Atlantic Palace is a condominium, hotel and vacation owners property in Atlantic City, New Jersey, that opened in 1986. It is the 14th tallest building in Atlantic City standing at 331.3 ft (101 m).

== History ==
The hotel opened in 1986 and is located on the boardwalk 0.3 miles from Resorts Casino Hotel. The building was constructed by United States Capital Corporation who also owned the Enclave at the time. It was previously owned by private hospitality company, FantaSea Resorts which also owns Flagship Resort and La Sammana. In 1994, Bruce Kaye, CEO of the hotel at the time, allowed the rooms to be purchased as a timeshare.

FantaSea Resorts sold the building to Bluegreen Corporation in 2008, but maintained ownership of "a block of suites for its own time-share members".

== Hotel ==
The hotel and property is known for is close proximity to major entertainment venues in Atlantic City as well as its view of the beach and boardwalk. The hotel offers one bedroom and penthouse suites. All rooms have both a hot tub and a kitchenette.

== See also ==
- List of tallest buildings in Atlantic City
