= Ocean Club (Atlantic City) =

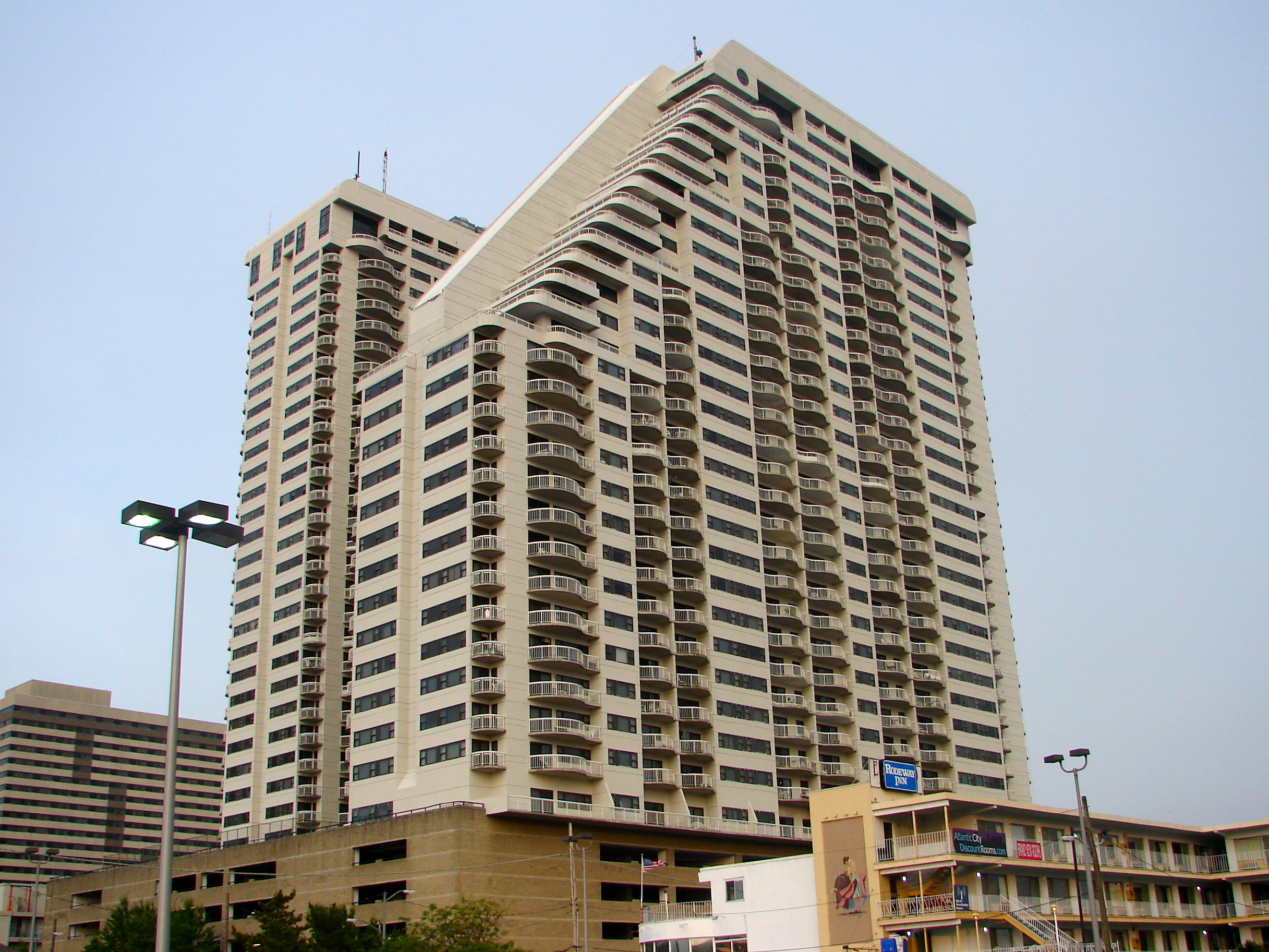
- Ocean Club condominium
- Interactive map of the Ocean Club area

General information
- Status: Completed
- Type: Condo
- Location: 3101 Boardwalk, Atlantic City, New Jersey, United States
- Coordinates: 39.351339°N 74.447968°W
- Completed: 1984
- Opening: 1984
- Cost: $122 million
- Management: Drexel Burnham Lambert Realty (formerly)

Height
- Roof: 360 feet (110 m)

Technical details
- Floor count: 34

Ocean Club Condominiums are twin building condominiums built in 1984 in Atlantic City, New Jersey. The twin buildings are the 10th and 11th tallest buildings in Atlantic City at a height of 360 feet (110 m).

== Condominium ==
The buildings were completed in 1984 and cost $122 million which was received in loans from Bank of America. Drexel Burnham Lambert Realty was the management company of the condo. The average age of those purchasing condos was 45 to 70. George Rebh, Ocean Club sales director, said they were "getting a lot of new-money people - self-made businessmen and doctors and other professionals". The average cost of a condo when the buildings was constructed ranged from $170,000 to $1.7 million.

Entertainers such as Frank Sinatra and Rod McKuen were among the buyers of Ocean Club condos. Residents of the Ocean Club have to pay $7,000 a year in property taxes and a condo fee of $850 per month.

The condo offers "a swimming pool, jacuzzi, gym, parking, and 24-hour front door concierge service". The condominium offers entertainment such as comedy acts. Comedian, Michelle Tomko, from the Broadway Comedy Club, has performed at the Ocean Club.

In 2019, the Celebrity Corner Restaurant located at the Ocean Club sought to expand its outdoor seating.

== See also ==
- List of tallest buildings in Atlantic City
