= Absecon Lighthouse =

Lighthouse in New Jersey, United States

Absecon Light
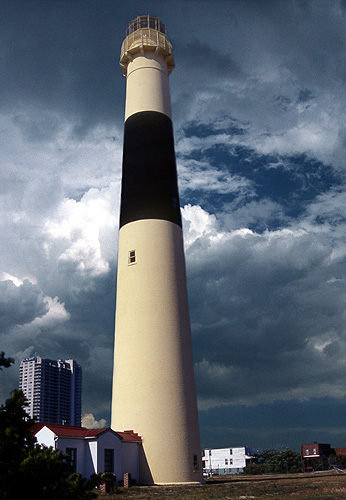
- Location: Vermont and Pacific Avenues, Atlantic City, New Jersey, U.S.
- Coordinates: 39°21′58″N 74°24′51″W

Tower
- Constructed: 1856
- Foundation: Granite blocks
- Construction: Brick and iron
- Height: 171 feet (52 m)
- Shape: Frustum of a cone attached to keeper's house
- Markings: yellow/black/yellow
- Heritage: National Register of Historic Places listed place

Light
- First lit: 1857
- Deactivated: 1933
- Focal height: 51 m (167 ft)
- Lens: First-order Fresnel lens
- Range: 19.5 nmi (36.1 km; 22.4 mi)
- Characteristic: fixed white light
- Absecon Lighthouse
- U.S. National Register of Historic Places
- New Jersey Register of Historic Places
- Area: 2 acres (0.81 ha)
- NRHP reference No.: 71000492
- NJRHP No.: 389

Significant dates
- Added to NRHP: January 25, 1971
- Designated NJRHP: September 11, 1970

The Absecon Lighthouse is a coastal lighthouse located in the north end of Atlantic City, New Jersey, overlooking Absecon Inlet. At 171 feet (52 m) it is the tallest lighthouse in the state of New Jersey and the third-tallest masonry lighthouse in the United States.

Construction on Absecon Lighthouse began in 1854, with the light first lit on January 15, 1857. The lighthouse was deactivated in 1933 and, although the light still shines every night, it is no longer an active navigational aid. The lighthouse is open to public visitation and, for a small donation, one may climb to the watch room and external gallery. A re-creation of the keepers' quarters was opened in 2002 and serves as a museum and gift shop. The original oil house now contains a Fresnel lens exhibit. Along with school and group tours, the Absecon Lighthouse offers an overnight program for Scouts, a winter arts program for children, and a wide variety of special events throughout the year.

The Absecon Lighthouse was designed by George Meade and still retains its original first-order fixed Fresnel lens. The lens is made of lead glass and weighs 12,800 pounds (5,800 kg) As the light was fixed (non-flashing), it does not have a landward segment allowing visitors to look up in the lens where the keepers entered it for maintenance.

Jack E. Boucher conceived and oversaw the preservation of the lighthouse in 1964.

The lighthouse is listed on the National Register of Historic Places, the Historic American Buildings Survey, and the New Jersey Register of Historic Places.

== Museum ==
Absecon Lighthouse has a history museum located in the replicated 1925 Keeper's House. Exhibits include ocean life, shipwrecks, keepers and lighthouse history, local memorabilia, and restoration photos. The Oil House has a Fresnel Lens exhibit. Visitors can climb the 228 steps to the top of the lighthouse. Educational programs are offered for groups and children.

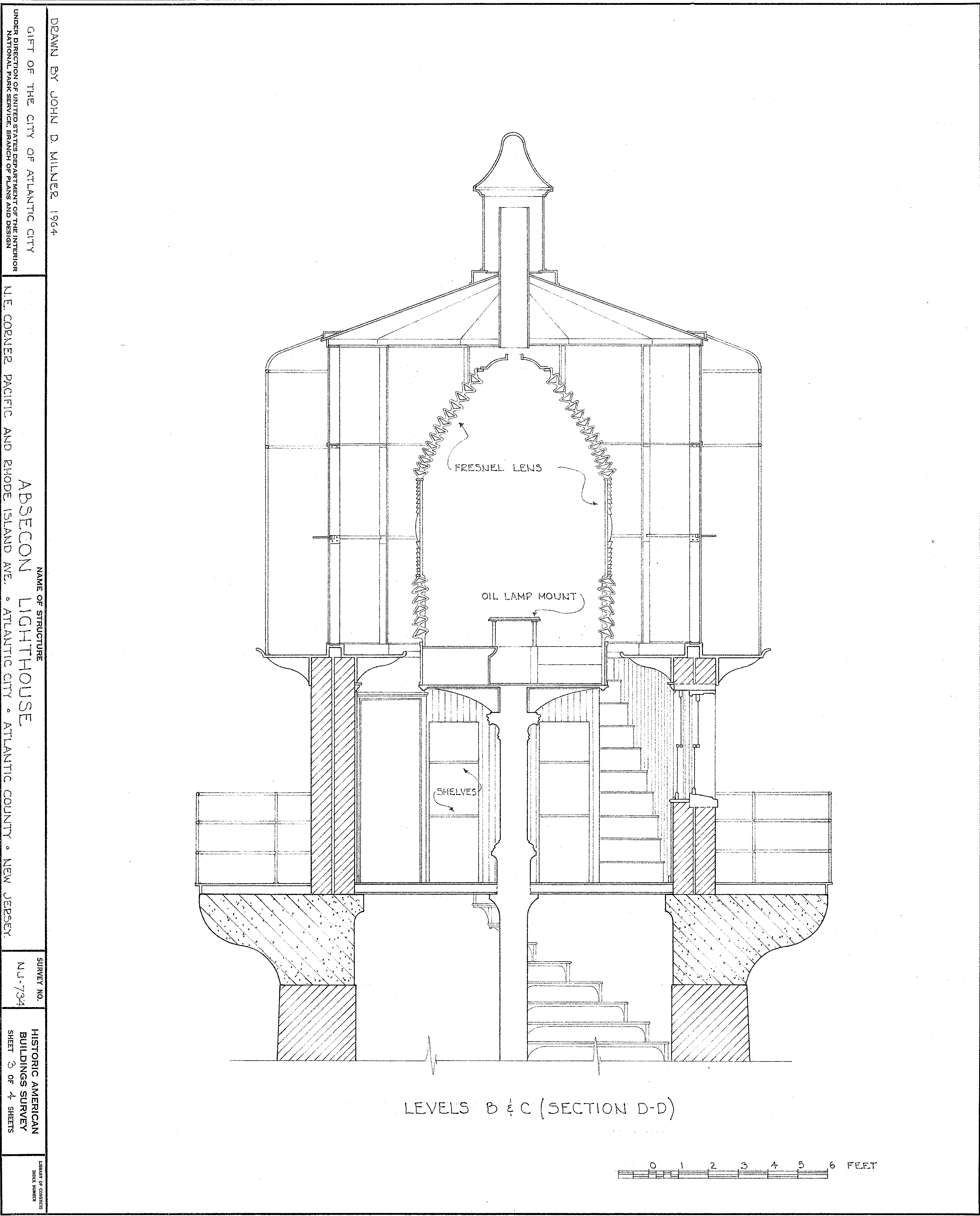
HABS drawing of the top level

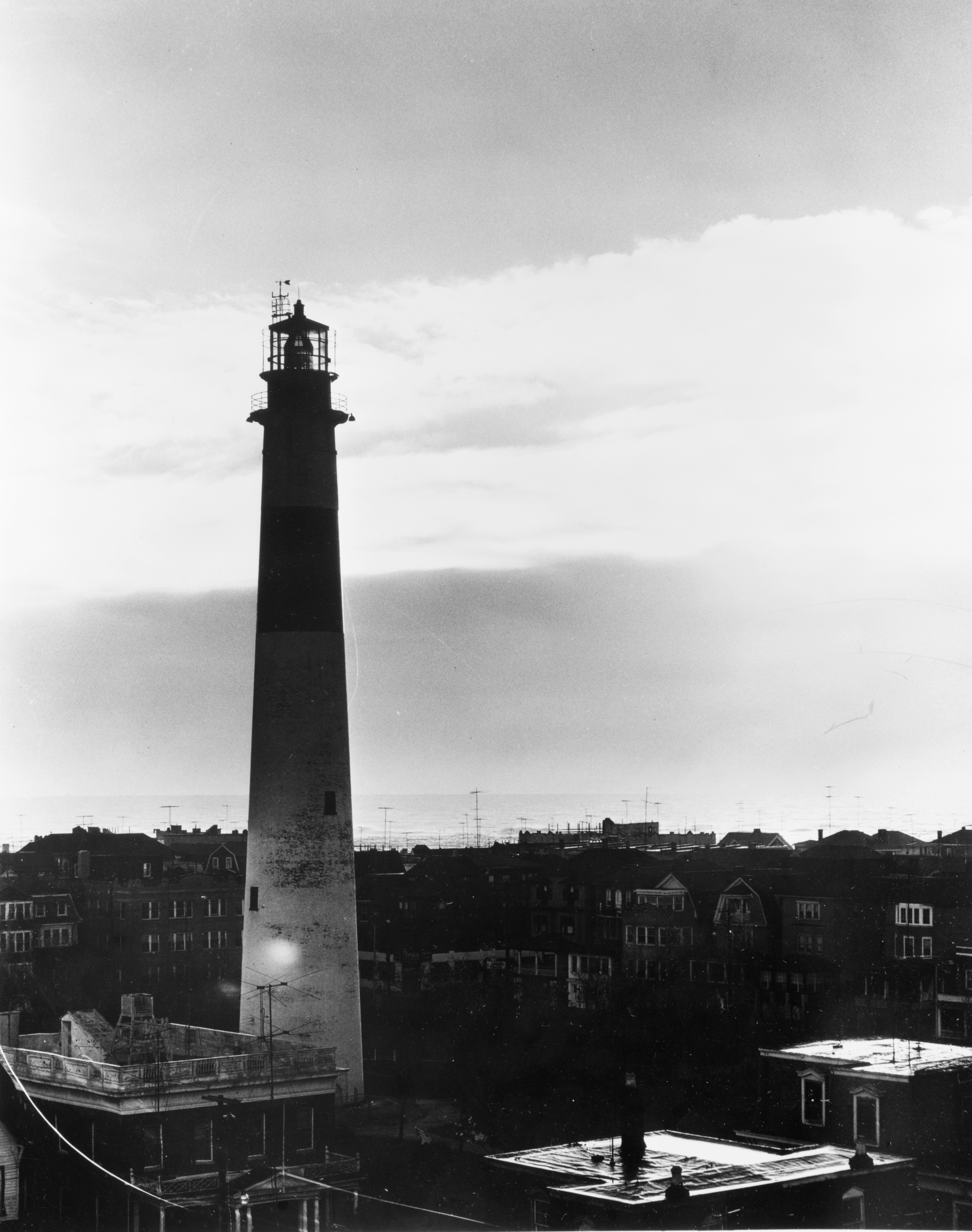
Jack Boucher's photo of the lighthouse at night

== See also ==
- List of museums in New Jersey
- List of tallest buildings in Atlantic City
- National Register of Historic Places listings in Atlantic County, New Jersey

Preceded by none	Tallest Building in Atlantic City; 1857—1915; 171 ft	Succeeded by Traymore Hotel
