= Flagship Resort =

Hotel and vacation owners property in Atlantic City, New Jersey

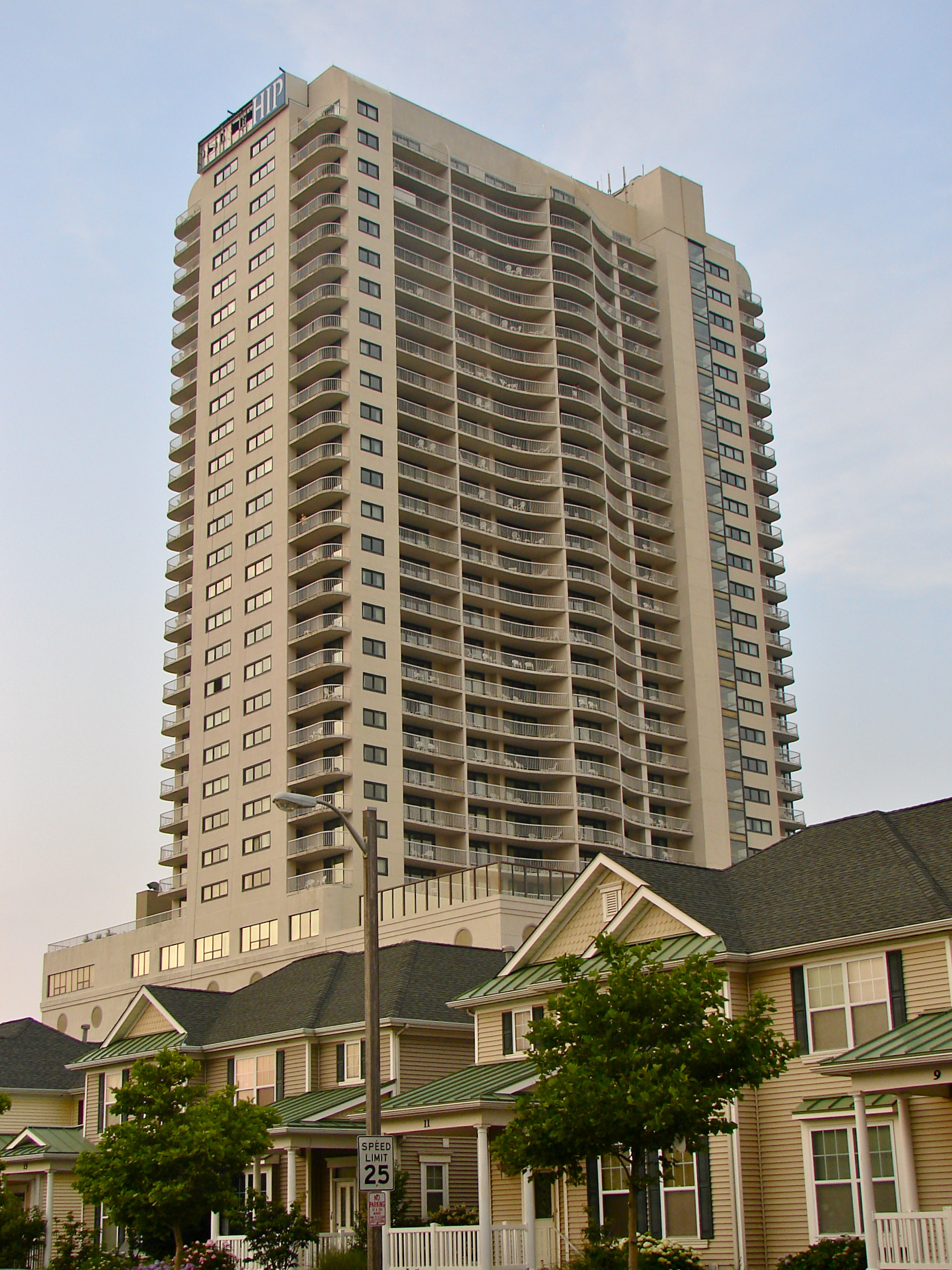
- View of hotel
- Interactive map of the Flagship Resort area

General information
- Location: Atlantic City, New Jersey, 60 N Maine Ave
- Coordinates: 39.369867°N 74.412648°W
- Opening: 1988
- Owner: FantaSea Resorts

Technical details
- Floor count: 32

Other information
- Number of rooms: 220

Website
- www.fantasearesorts.com/resorts/flagship/

The Flagship Resort is a hotel and timeshare property in Atlantic City, New Jersey, that opened in 1988. It is the 13th tallest building in Atlantic City standing at 336.5 ft (102.6 m).

== History ==
The hotel opened in 1988 and is located near the boardwalk and Absecon Inlet at Maine Avenue. It is currently owned by private hospitality company, Club Boardwalk Resorts which also owns Atlantic Palace and La Sammana. The hotel rooms can be purchased as a timeshare. Clients are flown to the hotel and given a two-hour presentation.

The hotel's restaurant, Blue Water Grille located on the 7th floor, has received high reviews and the restaurant has been labeled as having the best view in Atlantic City. The restaurant was opened in 1992 and is currently owned by Bruce Kaye.

In June 2019, Flagship Resort was selected as one of the locations to have a meet-and-greet with the inductees into the Atlantic City Boxing Hall of Fame, including Bernard Hopkins.

== See also ==
- List of tallest buildings in Atlantic City
