= List of tallest buildings in Atlantic City =

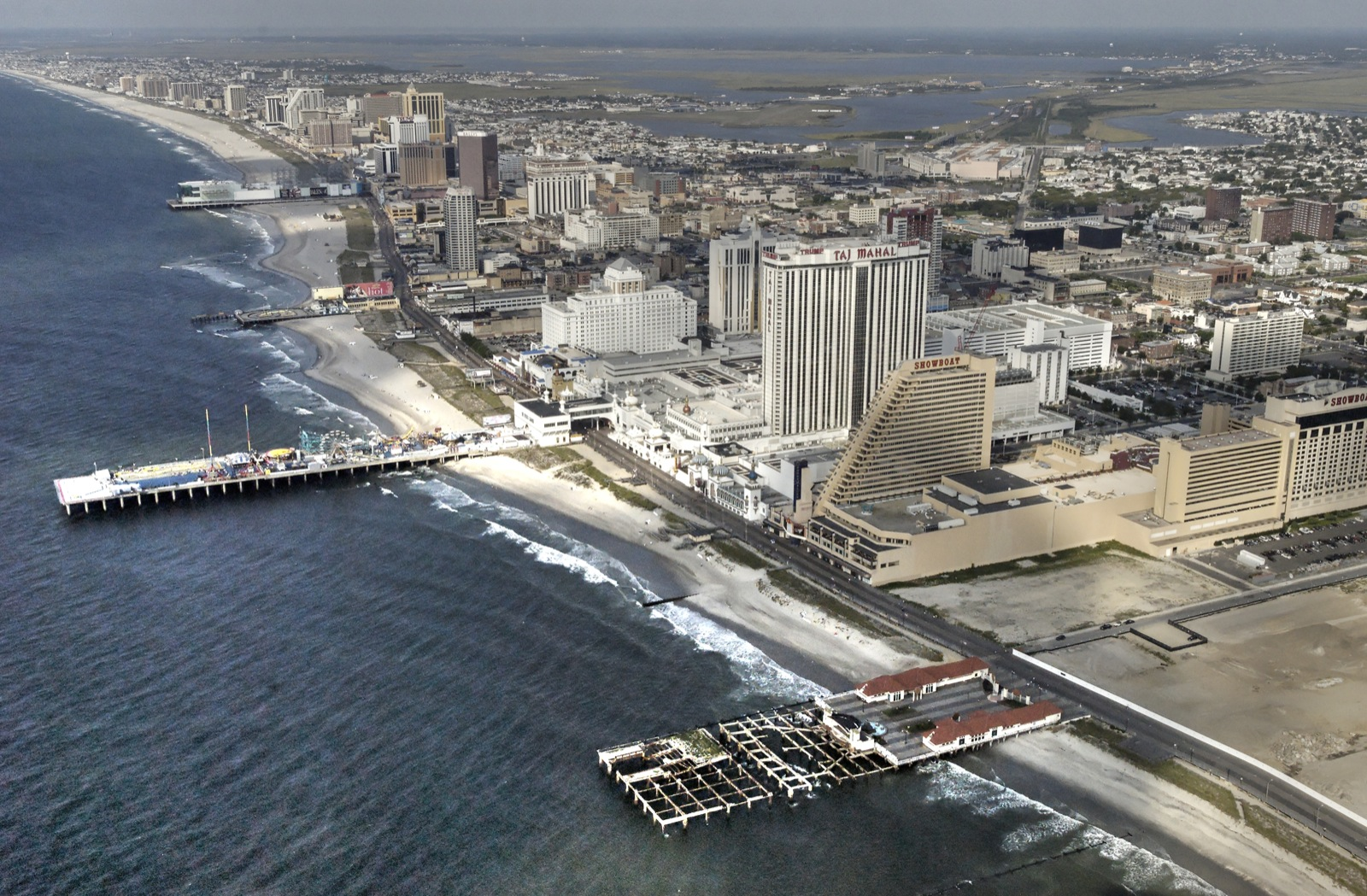
Skyline of Atlantic City looking south (2007)

The following is a list of the tallest buildings in Atlantic City.

Casino hotels dominate the skyline and are interspersed with residential highrises. Prior to their construction following the legalization of gambling in the 1970s grand hotels, many built between the start of the 20th century and the Roaring Twenties, lined the Boardwalk, the first in the world. Since the 1980s, especially after the 2001 opening of the Brigantine Connector, the Marina District at the city's north end has seen much new development.

== Tallest buildings ==
Was the tallest building in Atlantic City upon completion

| Rank | Name | Image | Height | Floors | Year | Notes |
|---|---|---|---|---|---|---|
| 1 | Ocean Casino Resort | | 718 ft (219 m) | 57 | 2012 | Seventh-tallest building in New Jersey; Tallest building built in the 2010s |
| 2 | Harrah's Waterfront Tower | | 525 ft (160 m) | 46 | 2008 | Tallest building built in the 2000s |
| 3 | Hard Rock's North Tower | | 470 ft (140 m) | 41 | 2008 | |
| 4 | MGM Tower | | 460 ft (140 m) | 39 | 2008 | |
| 5 | Borgata Hotel and Casino | | 430 ft (130 m) | 43 | 2003 | |
| 6 | Hard Rock Hotel & Casino Atlantic City | | 430 ft (130 m) | 42 | 1990 | Tallest building built in the 1990s |
| 8 | Jersey-Atlantic Wind Farm | | 380 ft (120 m) | n/a | 2005 | Five wind turbines, first coastal wind farm in the United States |
| 8 | Bally's Atlantic City | | 380 ft (120 m) | 38 | 1989 | Tallest building built in the 1980s |
| 9 | The Claridge | | 370 ft (110 m) | 24 | 1930 | Tallest building from 1930 to 1989 aka "The Skyscraper By The Sea" |
| 10/11 | Ocean Club | | 360 ft (110 m) | 34 | 1984 | Twin towers are tallest residential buildings |
| 12 | Resorts Rendezvous Tower | | 348 ft (106 m) | 27 | 2004 | |
| 13 | The Flagship Resort | | 336.5 ft (102.6 m) (estimated) | 32 | 1988 | |
| 14 | Atlantic Palace Suites | | 331 ft (101 m) | 31 | 1986 | |
| 15 | Harrahs Bayview Tower | | 302 ft (92 m) | 25 | 2002 | |
| 15 | Wyndham Skyline Tower | | 302 ft (92 m) | 30 | 2004 | |
| 17 | Caesars Centurion Tower | | 299 ft (91 m) | 25 | 1997 | |
| 18 | Golden Nugget Atlantic City | | 287 ft (87 m) | 27 | 1985 | |
| 19 | The Enclave | | 285 ft (87 m) | 27 | 1984 | |
| 20 | Tropicana Havana Tower | | 282 ft (86 m) | 33 | 2003 | |
| 21 | Tropicana Solana Tower | | 282 ft (86 m) | 32 | 1996 | |
| 22 | Bella | | 272 ft (83 m) | 27 | 1988 | |
| 23 | Haddon Hall | | 260 ft (79 m) | 15 | 1929 | Known as Resorts Ocean Tower |
| 24 | Showboat Bourbon Tower | | 254 ft (77 m) | 25 | 1987 | Showboat closed 2014, reopened 2016. |

== Timeline of tallest buildings ==
| Name | Image | Height ft m | Floors | Years tallest |
|---|---|---|---|---|
| Absecon Light | | 171 ft (52 m) | 17 | 1854-1857 |
| The Blenheim | | 160 ft (49 m) | 12 | 1902-1906 |
| Traymore Hotel | | 220 ft (67 m) | 19 | 1915-1921 |
| Ritz-Carlton Hotel | | 222 ft (68 m) | 18 | 1921-1929 |
| Haddon Hall | | 260 ft (79 m) | 15 | 1929-1930 |
| The Claridge | | 370 ft (110 m) | 24 | 1930-1990 |
| Bally's Atlantic City | | 380 ft (120 m) | 38 | 1989-1990 |
| Hard Rock Hotel & Casino Atlantic City | | 430 ft (130 m) | 41 | 1990-2003 |
| Borgata | | 430 ft (130 m) | 43 | 2003-2008 |
| Harrah's Atlantic City | | 525 ft (160 m) | 45 | 2008-2012 |
| Ocean Resort Casino | | 718 ft (220 m) | 57 | 2012-present |

== Old tallest buildings ==
| Name | Image | Year built | Height ft / m | Floors | Notes |
|---|---|---|---|---|---|
| Absecon Light | | 1854–1857 | 171 ft (52 m) | 17 | First lit 1857, deactivated 1933. Still in operation, it is no longer an official navigational aid. |
| The Blenheim | | 1902-06 | 160 ft (49 m) | 12 | One world's earliest and largest reinforced concrete buildings when built Building implosion 1979 |
| Traymore Hotel | | 1915 | 220 ft (67 m) | 19 | Building implosion 1972 |
| Ritz-Carlton Hotel | | 1921 | 222 ft (68 m) | 18 | Converted to apartment hotel 1969, now condominiums |
| Haddon Hall | | 1929 | 260 ft (79 m) | 15 | Known as Resorts Ocean Tower |

== See also ==
- Casinos in Atlantic City
- Gambling in New Jersey
