= Jack Boucher =

American photographer (1931–2012)

- Boucher with his large format camera
- Born: Jack E. Boucher; September 4, 1931
- Died: September 2, 2012 (aged 80)
- Occupation: Photographer

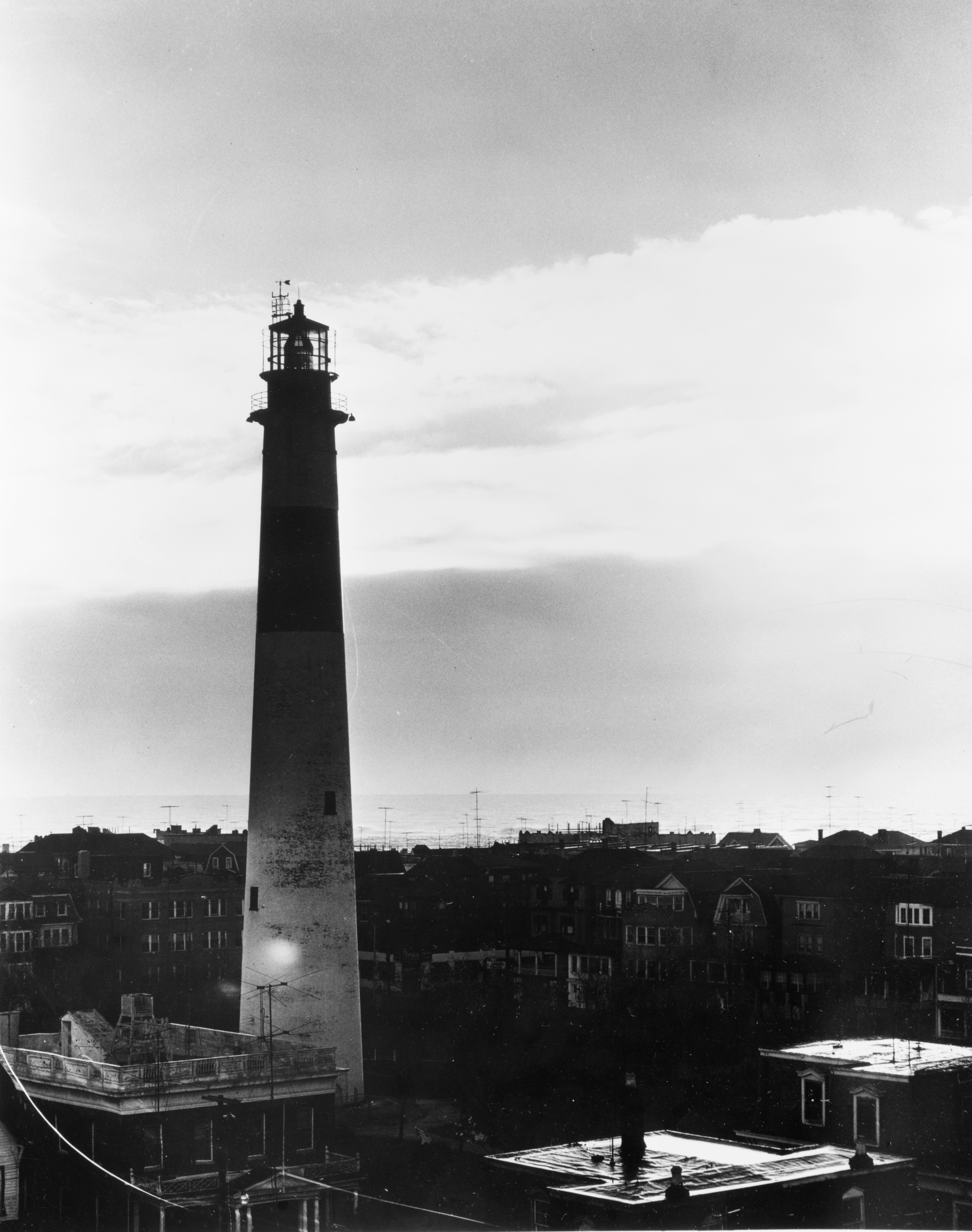
Abescon Light near Boucher's boyhood home in Atlantic City, New Jersey (HABS, c. 1964).

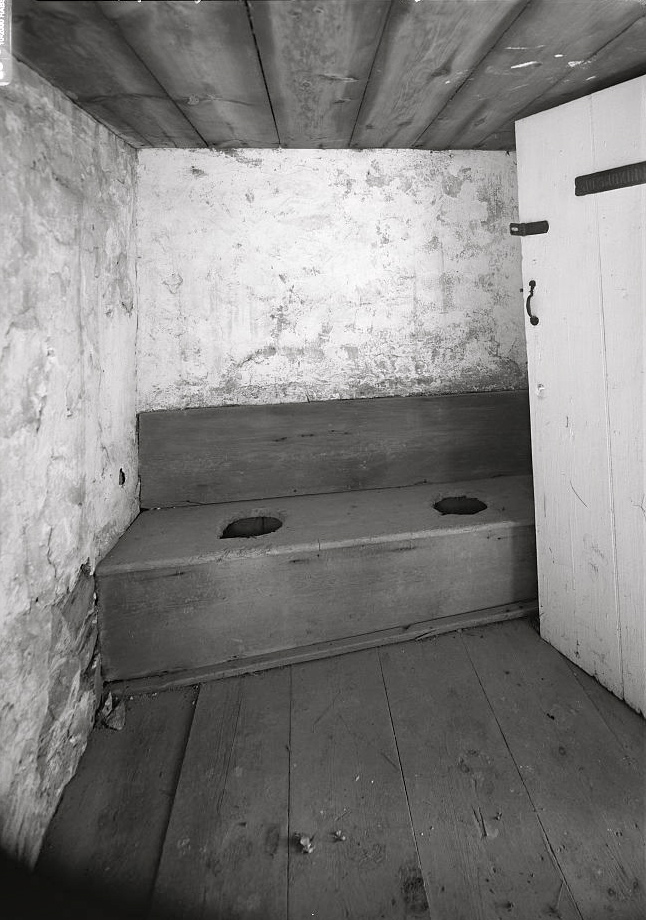
Privy at Chichester Friends Meetinghouse (c.1769) (HABS)

Jack E. Boucher (September 4, 1931 – September 2, 2012) was an American photographer for the National Park Service for more than 40 years beginning in 1958. He served as the Chief Photographer for the Historic American Buildings Survey (HABS). In 1966 he left the Park Service for two years to supervise New Jersey's State Historic Preservation program, including the State's roadside marker program, 18 historic museum houses, several lighthouses, and two historic villages. Offered his old job back by the Park Service/HABS in 1970, he left New Jersey to return to NPS/HABS and the highly specialized job of large format photographic architectural documentation. His work took him to 49 States, the Virgin Islands and Puerto Rico. April 2008 was the fiftieth anniversary of his employment with the National Park Service's "HABS" program. He traveled with 900 pounds of photographic equipment.

== Career ==
Boucher's first job was photo lab and engraving chief for the Atlantic City Tribune (1949–1951), then at Fred Hess & Son Photographers in Atlantic City from February 1951 to September 1952, and then at the Garden State Parkway as chief of photography from September 1952 to April 1958. He also wrote a weekly column on conservation and preservation for the Tribune and then The Press of Atlantic City for two years. He produced and presented a one-hour radio program dealing with conservation and preservation from 1952 to 1953 on WFPG in Atlantic City. He then left the Parkway to work for the National Park Service.

He was first assigned to work jointly with the Washington Branch of Still and Motion Pictures under Ralph Anderson, chief of the branch, and with HABS, Historic Structures at the NPS Eastern Office of Design and Construction in Philadelphia. From 1958 to 1962, Boucher documented one of the most significant periods in National Park Service history: Mission 66, a design and construction program intended to revitalize the national parks through a massive, 10-year program of capital investment. In 1963, he became Chief Photographer of the Historic American Buildings Survey. From 1971 to 1978, Boucher also performed all photography work for the Historic American Engineering Record. He died on September 2, 2012, at age 80.

Boucher stated, "My whole philosophy is, I regard the building I'm doing as the most important one in my life, even if it's a single-seat log outhouse."

== Career highlights ==
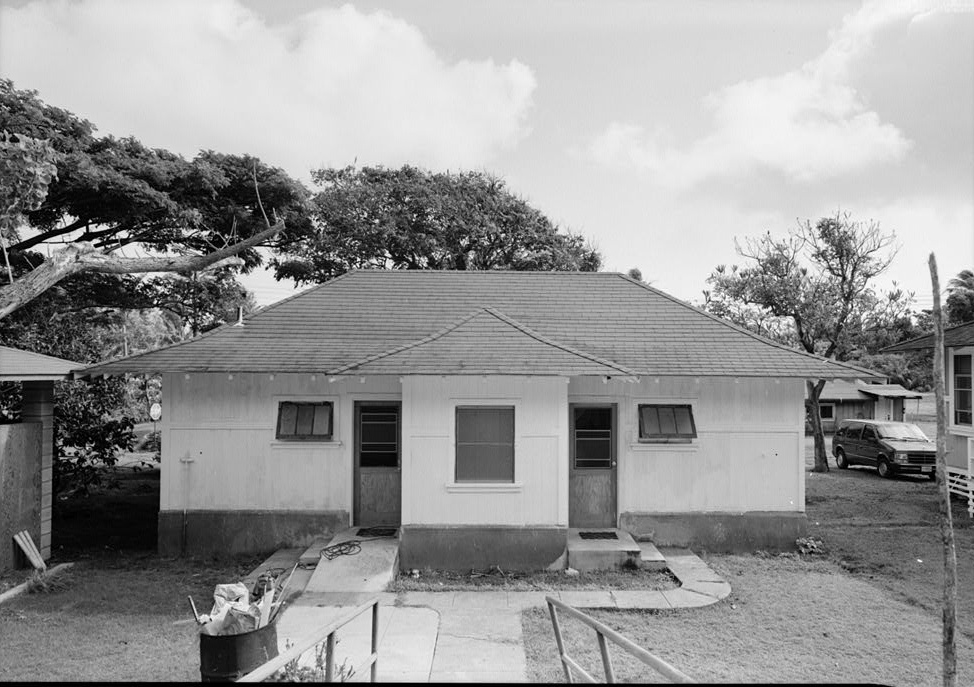
Fumigation Hall in Kalaupapa, 1991

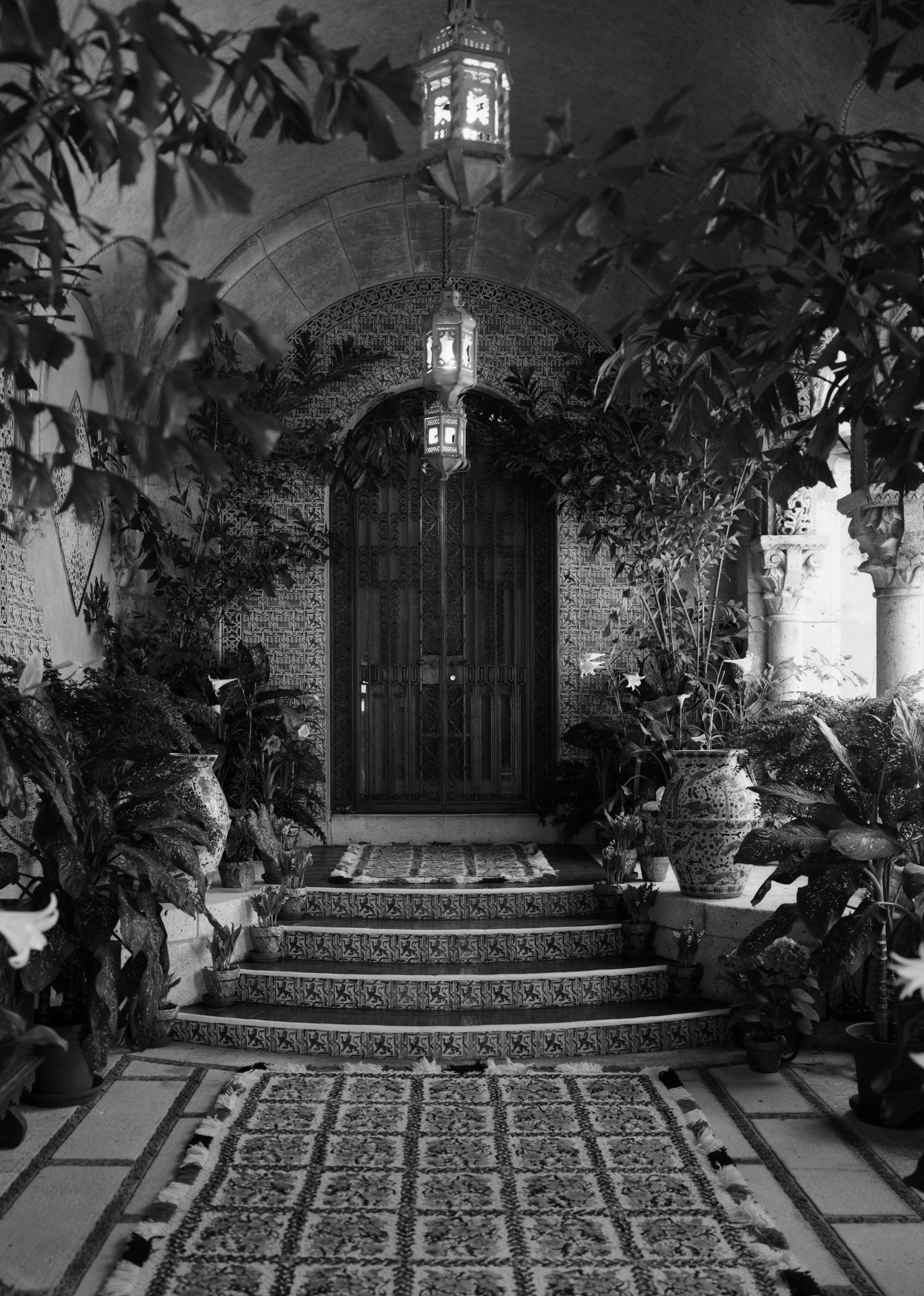
Entrance to Mar-a-Lago, Palm Beach, Florida, 1967.

Boucher worked 18 hours non-stop photographing a hurricane that ravaged Atlantic City in November 1950, holding his 4x5 large format speed graphic and camera bag over his head in water up to his armpits. While reconnoitering camera vantage points to document Fortress El Morro in Old San Juan in 1967, Puerto Rico. Boucher and his wife Peggy were passengers aboard a sailing catamaran that was struck and cut in two by a submarine entering the San Juan harbor. During the 1990s he produced over 500 large format images of the White House for the Historic American Buildings Survey, some days producing only a single image. A proud possession is a book published by the White House centering on the family living quarters illustrated by his work. His copy was personally autographed to him by the President and the First Lady.

The assignment of which he was most proud was a three-week stint photographically documenting the leprosy settlement "Kalaupapa," on the Hawaiian island of Molokai, living among the 85 victims still in residence there at the time. "I vividly remember studying the story of the Belgian Priest Fr. Damien and his labors for 16 years among the lepers while in grade school. I never dreamed I would be able to go there."

Boucher completed the National Trust of England's "Attingham School" in 1969, an intensive summer study program dealing with the historic country houses of England, and architecture from Roman times to the Regency Period. About 1973 he was one of 36 selected to participate in the European Traveling Summer School for Historic Architecture and Preservation. It was a seven-week study tour through England, France, the Netherlands and Belgium.

American Preservation Magazine published a series of articles in which he wrote and showed photographs of historic cities in the Soviet Union, Belgium, Hungary and Italy.

He conceived and oversaw the preservation of Atlantic City's 1857 Absecon Lighthouse in 1964; the ca 1820s Weymouth Furnace. Earlier, and at age 21 in 1952, Boucher was the instigator and one of two key people from the preservation/conservation field responsible for the preservation of New Jersey 98,000 acres (400 km^{2}) Wharton Forest, home to three major historic iron furnace villages that served the American Revolution, twenty four species of wild orchids, the habitat of the rare "Pine Barrens Tree Frog," and a canoeing and hunting retreat.

In 1952 he personally guided Mike Hudoba, noted outdoors writer on a several day canoe trip through the Wharton Forest rivers. He once spoke of a three-week canoe trip to fish for trout in Canadian wilderness a few hundred miles from the Arctic Circle. Navigating the Bersimus River, they were attempting to reach Lake Boucher but were unable to portage around rapids.

== Legacy ==
With more than five decades of public service, he was the creator of tens of thousands of public domain photographs. In 1986 he received the Department of the Interior's Meritorious Service Award. Other awards include The Medal for Architectural Photography by the American Institute of Architects, Awards of Merit and also Commendation from the American Association for State and Local History and a Resolution of Commendation from New Jersey State Senate, as well as others.

He lectured extensively, including appearances at Columbia University, The College of William & Mary, Cornell University, Ball State University, University of Florida, University of Texas at Austin, Franklin Pierce University, history and preservation organizations and other schools across the nation. For some 15 years he annually produced and taught architectural documentation photography of historic structures to the Preservation Institute of Nantucket, the nine-week summer preservation program of the University of Florida's School of Architecture.

Major exhibits of his work include two at the Library of Congress, one at the American Institute of Architects, the Atheneum of Philadelphia, Buffalo History Museum in New York, as well as in Puerto Rico, Columbia and SC.

Well over an estimated 50,000 of his HABS/HAER photographs are in the collections of the Library of Congress, most of which are available at no cost online, or for nominal reproduction costs in hardcopy. He never accepted private commissions or sold copies of his work.

== Publications ==
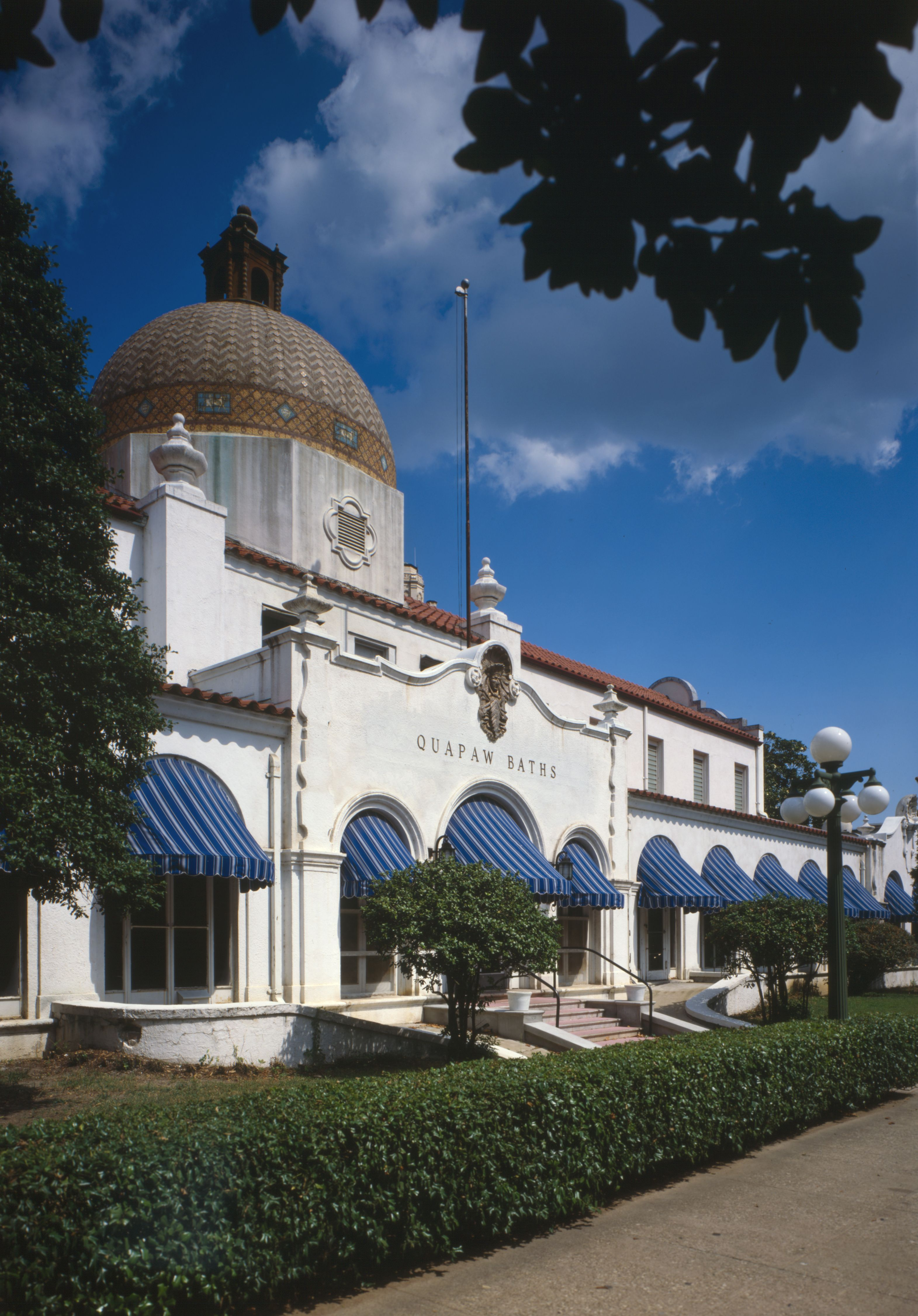
Quapaw Baths in Bathhouse Row, Hot Springs National Park, Arkansas (1984).

- A Record in Detail: The Architectural Photographs of Jack E. Boucher (1988) (ISBN 0-8262-0640-9)
- A Quest for Grandeur: Charles Moore and the Federal Triangle, text by Sally Kress Tompkins (ISBN 1-56098-161-X)
- Landmarks of Prince George's County/Architectural Photographs (ISBN 0-8018-4628-5)
- Absegami Yesteryear (1964), Laureate Press: history of Atlantic County, New Jersey
- Of Batsto & Bog Iron (1964), Batsto Citizens Advisory Committee
- Atlantic City's historic Absecon lighthouse (1964), Atlantic County Historical Society (he chaired a committee that saved the tower from destruction and oversaw its restoration in 1963)
- Lucy, The Margate Elephant (1970), Save Lucy Committee, a National Historic Landmark
- A Record In Detail, University of Missouri Press
- Quest for Grandeur,^{1} Smithsonian Press
- Landmarks of Prince George's County (1993),^{1} Johns Hopkins Press (ISBN 978-0801846281)
- Under Four Flags,^{1} (California)
- Architecture of Middle Tennessee (1974),^{1} Vanderbilt University Press (ISBN 978-0826511843)
- Industrial Archeology,^{1} Stephen Greene Press. Etc.

== Gallery ==
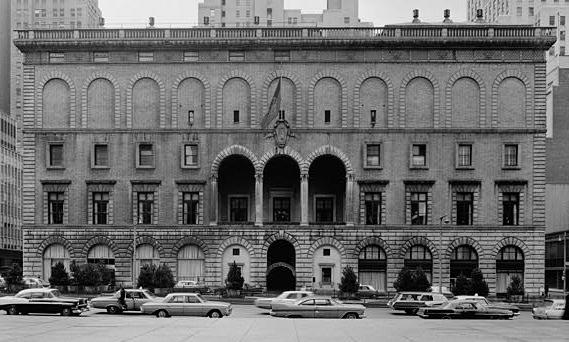
Racquet and Tennis Club, New York City, 1965.

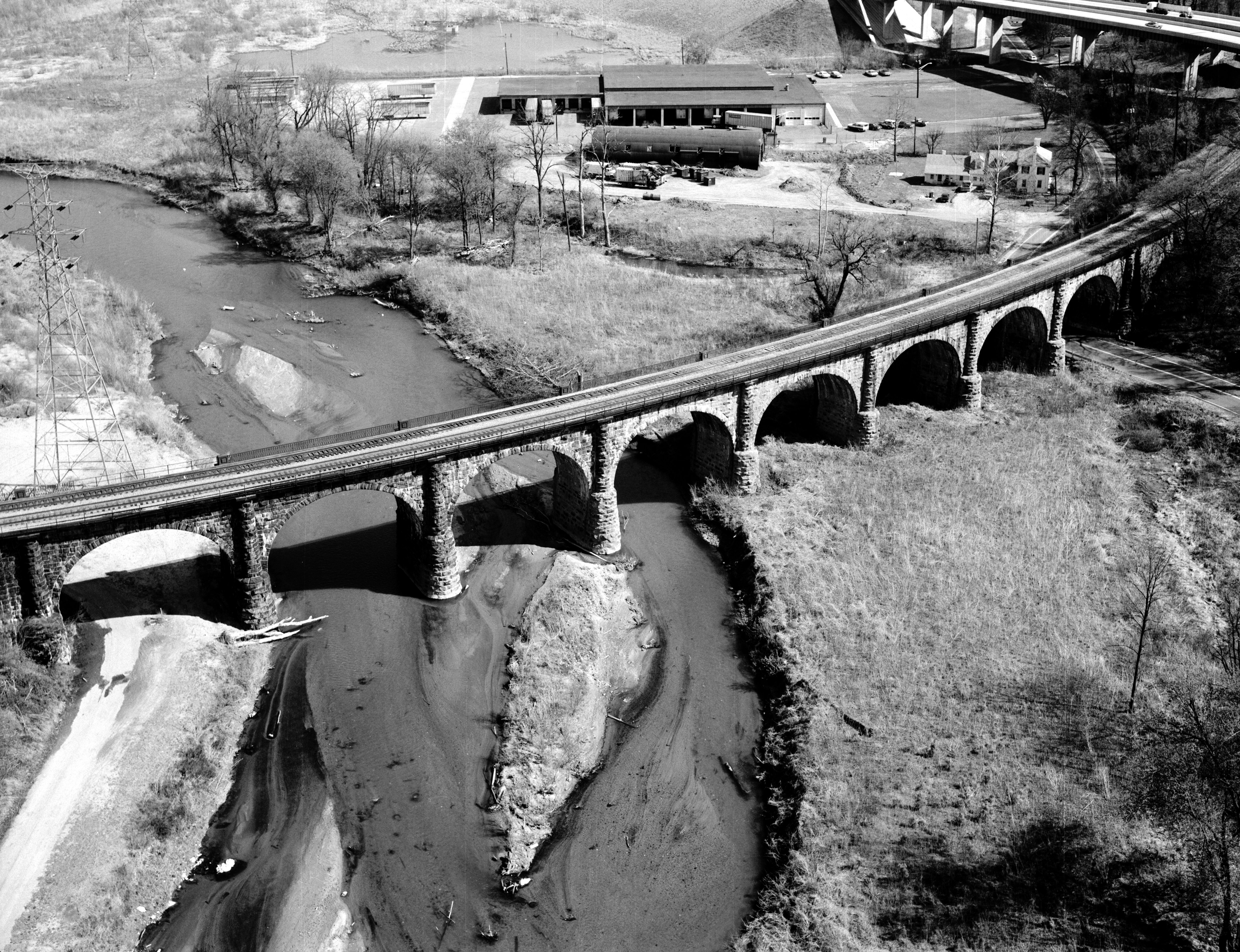
Thomas Viaduct, Elkridge, Maryland, 1977.

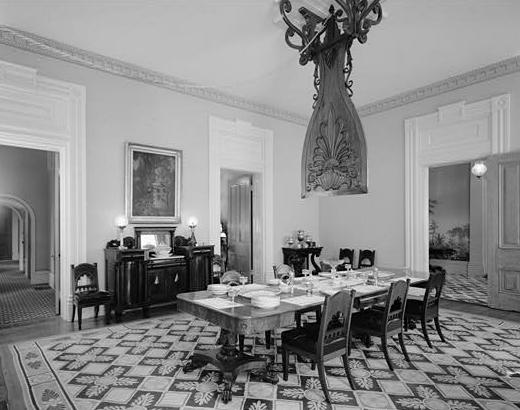
Melrose mansion, Natchez, Mississippi (1992).

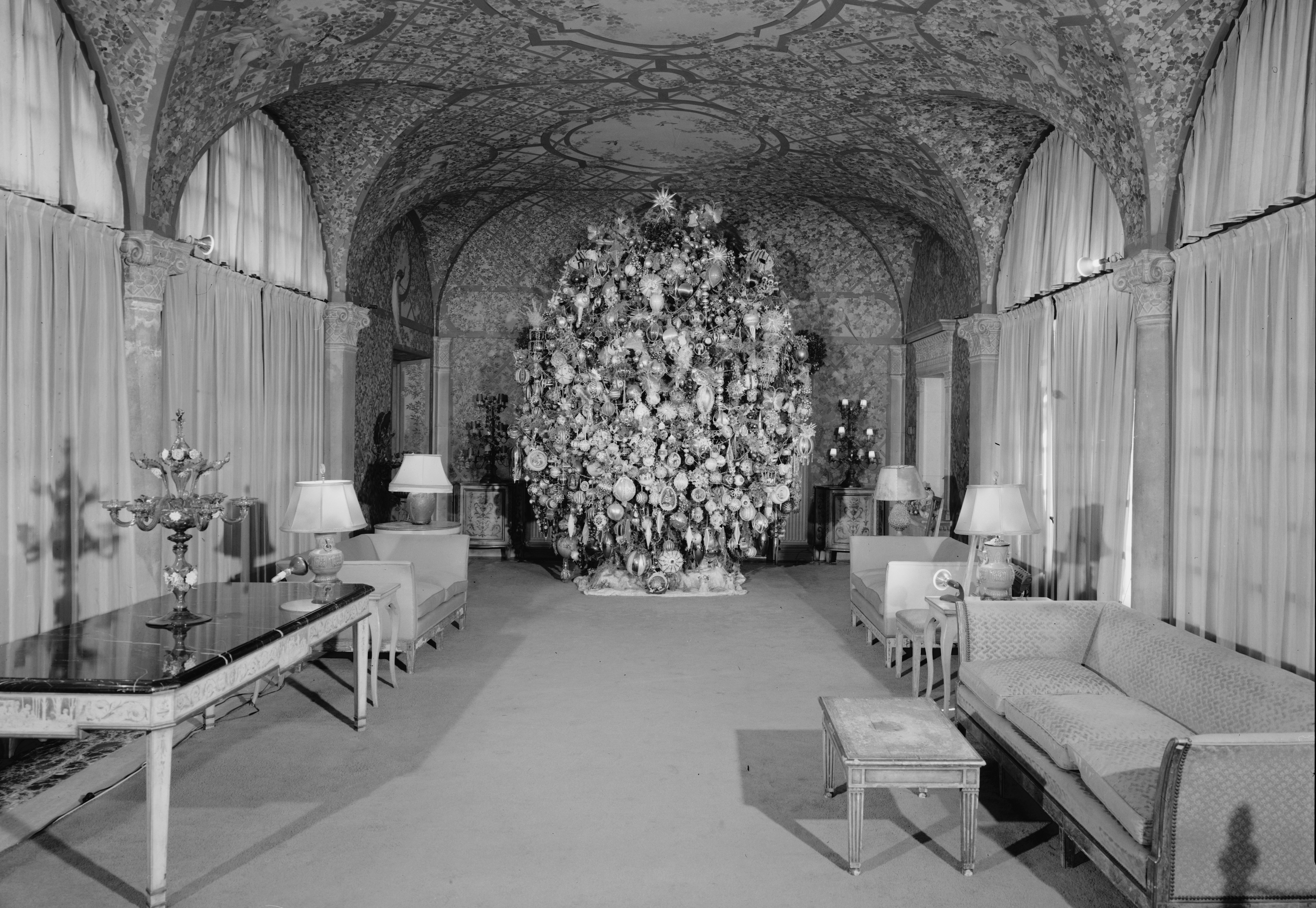
Harold Lloyd Estate Christmas tree in 1974.

== See also ==
- Architectural photographers
