= The Claridge Hotel (Atlantic City) =

Hotel in New Jersey, United States

The Claridge
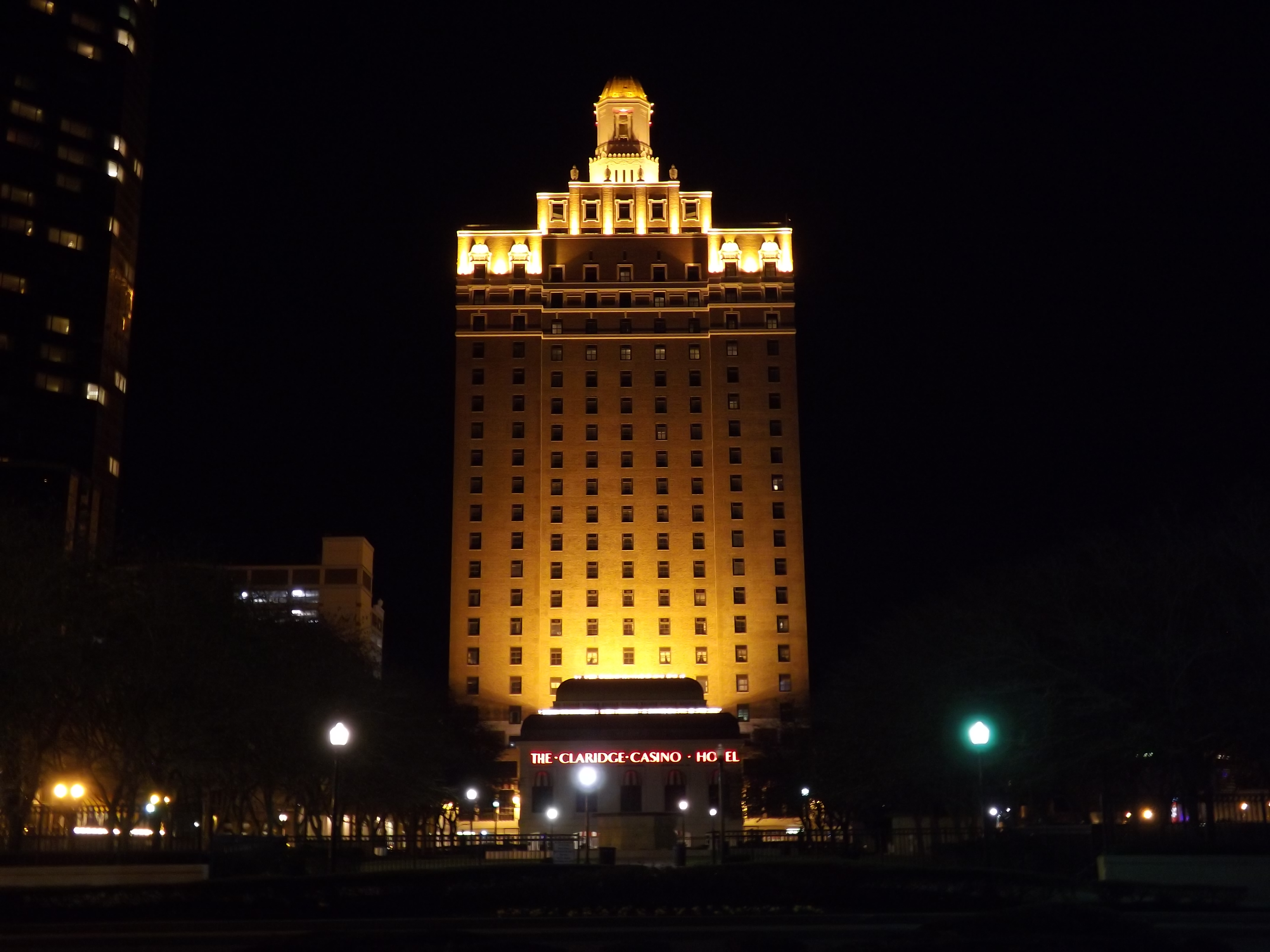
- The Claridge Hotel at night
- Interactive map of the The Claridge area
- Former names: Del Webb’s Claridge Hotel and Casino; Claridge Hotel and Casino
- Alternative names: The Skyscraper By The Sea

General information
- Location: Atlantic City, New Jersey, Park Place & The Boardwalk
- Completed: 1930
- Opening: December 1930
- Renovated: 1977, 2014
- Owner: TJM Properties

Technical details
- Floor count: 24

Other information
- Number of rooms: 480
- Number of suites: 480
- Parking: 500

Website
- http://www.claridge.com
- Claridge Hotel and Casino
- Location: 39.3575°N 74.4318°W
- Opened: July 20, 1981
- Closed: December 30, 2002
- Theme: London
- Previous names: Del Webb’s Claridge Hotel and Casino

The Claridge is a historic hotel in Atlantic City, New Jersey, that opened in 1930. Beginning in 1981, Claridge's operated for many years as a casino, known first as "Del Webb's Claridge Hotel and Casino", then as "Claridge Hotel and Casino". The hotel was acquired by Bally's on December 30, 2002, as a hotel tower of Bally's Atlantic City. In February 2014, the property was acquired by TJM Properties of Clearwater, Florida, which returned the property to a stand-alone hotel without casino gambling.

== Location ==
Located between Park Place and Indiana Avenue, with an attached parking structure extending to Ohio Avenue, the Claridge is set off the Boardwalk behind Brighton Park. The Claridge stands next to the site where the Sands Atlantic City used to be located. Rainbow Beach is in front of the hotel.

== History ==
The Claridge Hotel is different from most Atlantic City resorts, because it did not grow out of a modest boarding house. It was the idea of Philadelphia architect John McShain who designed the 24-story, 400-room hotel. Opened in 1930 during The Great Depression, the Claridge became the last of the great hotels built in Atlantic City near the Boardwalk; no new resorts rose in the city until the 1960s when a Howard Johnsons hotel was built along the boardwalk. Due to the Claridge's tall, slick, slender appearance it gained the nickname “The Skyscraper By The Sea".

The Claridge was a successful hotel during the 1930s, 1940s, and 1950s. Marilyn Monroe was a special guest there in the 1950s when she was a judge of the annual Miss America Pageant. Despite Atlantic City's downturn as a premier vacation resort in the 1960s, the hotel continued to operate and survived into the casino era.

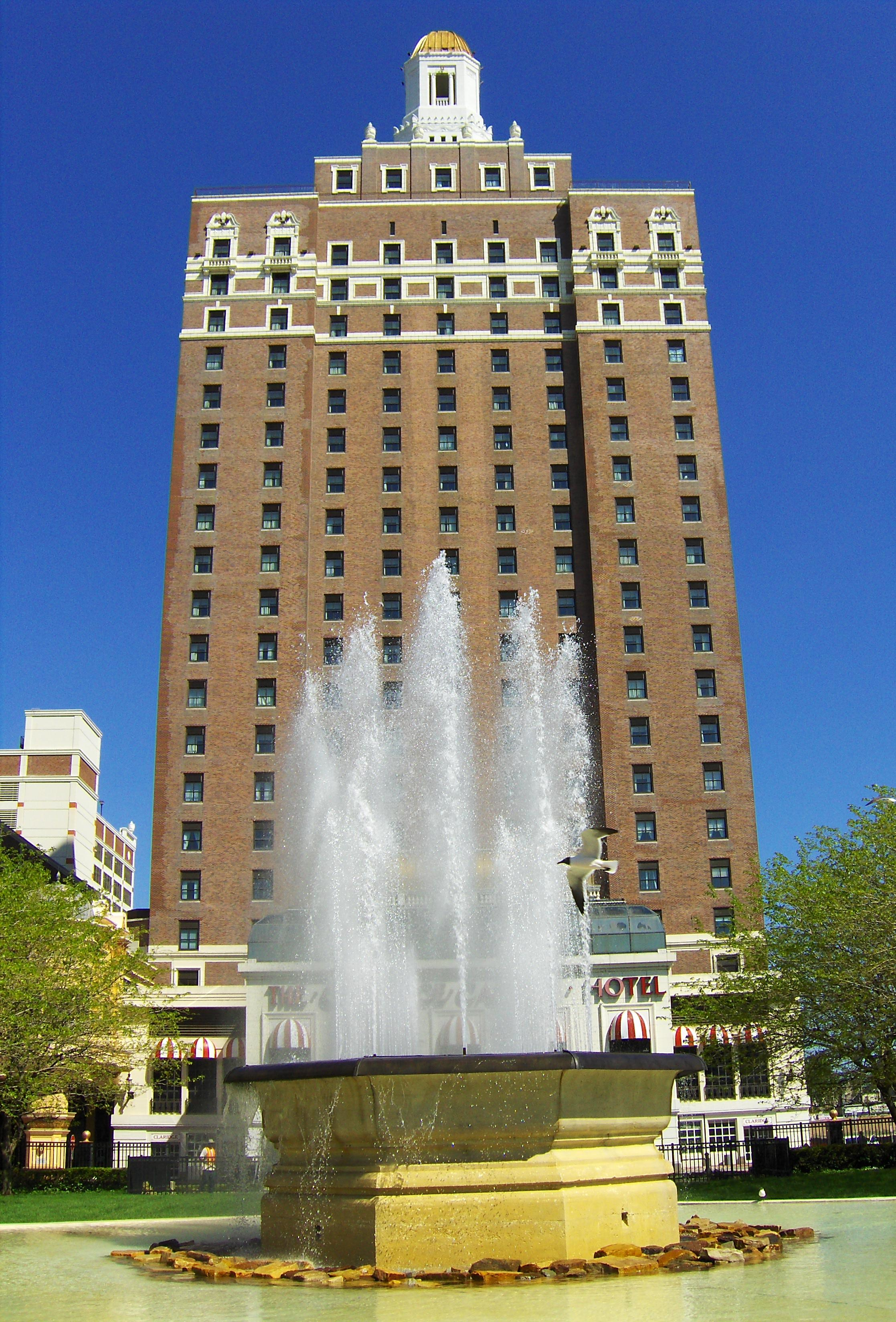
Claridge Atlantic City

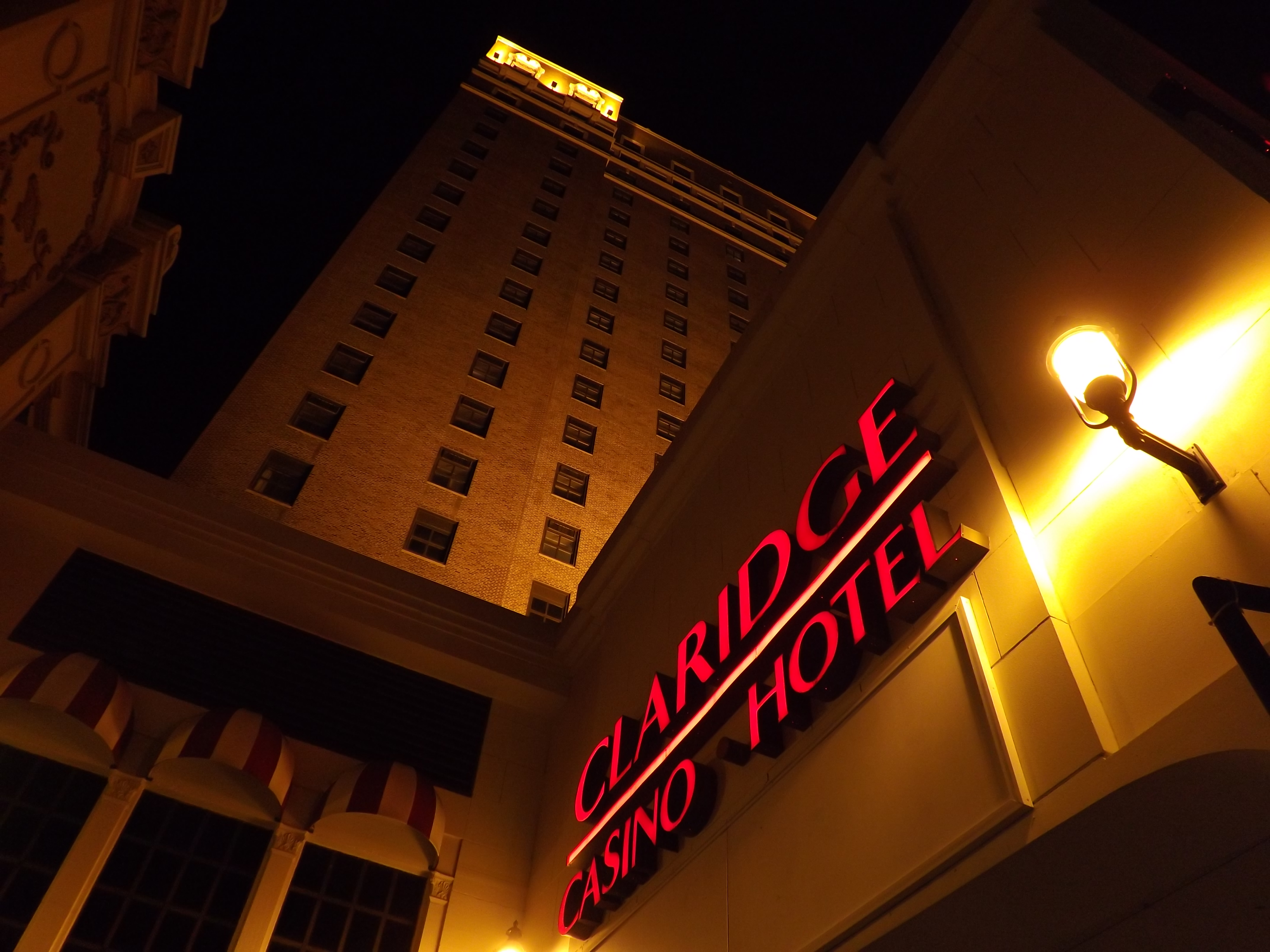
Closeup of the Signage

== Casino era ==
In February 1977, Claridge Associates, a group of Connecticut investors led by F. Francis D'Addario, purchased the Claridge Hotel. In 1979, they took on Del E. Webb Corporation as a partner in order to obtain financing. Del Webb owned several Nevada casinos, including The Mint Hotel and Casino in Downtown Las Vegas. The Claridge hotel was expanded with 200 new guest rooms being built; it had the distinction of being the last of the pre-casino Atlantic City hotels to be refurbished into a casino. The New Jersey Governor at the time, Brendan Byrne, had been dissatisfied with what he called “Patch and Paint” jobs of the city's old resorts, which had been done with Resorts Atlantic City and the Dennis Hotel, which is part of Bally's Atlantic City, and he lobbied hard for the old structures to be torn down and replaced with new resorts.

Del Webb faced a difficult time obtaining a permanent license but finally obtained one in 1982. At that time, Del Webb bought out Claridge Associates' interest in the partnership.

In July 1981, the new casino opened under the name Del Webb's Claridge Hotel and Casino (the hotel eventually became known as Del Webb's Claridge and eventually just The Claridge). The London-themed hotel saw success early on with its multi-level casino and 600-seat showroom that featured names like Aretha Franklin, Donny & Marie, Billy Crystal, Penn & Teller, Joan Rivers, The Isley Brothers, and The 5th Dimension. As larger casinos were built in the city, the Claridge had a hard time competing as a small casino in a large market. An elevated moving walkway was constructed in 1988, which connected the hotel to the boardwalk and with the neighboring Sands property and would stay in operation until the Sands closed in 2006. In the 1990s, a parking garage was added.

In 2001, Park Place Entertainment purchased the property and a year later formally announced plans to merge operations with Bally's Atlantic City. As a result, the Claridge became a hotel tower for Bally's. In 2009, all of the Claridge's own restaurants ceased operation, but a small cafe, "The Corner Cafe", that continues to operate in the Gateway area that connects the Claridge Tower with Bally's.

In 2009, the Claridge rebranded its casino floor theRIDGE, and modeled the floor after a dance club, with a dance floor and DJ at its center, surrounded by table games. An extensive restoration was completed during the summer of 2010 through spring 2011, including a $3 million renovation of all hotel rooms and a $17 million facelift of the outside structure. But this was not enough to save its gambling business in the wake of a catastrophic period for Atlantic City's casinos, several of which filed for bankruptcy or closed altogether. theRIDGE ended its gambling and food operations during the winter of 2012; however, Bally's continued to use its 500 hotel rooms for guests.

== Current status ==
On October 29, 2013, Caesars Entertainment announced that the Claridge tower was sold to TJM Properties of Clearwater, Florida. According to the statement, TJM will continue to operate the hotel and add non-gaming amenities to the property. On February 24, 2014, TJM Properties officially took ownership of the Claridge. The Claridge Hotel reopened in May 2014. The Claridge joined Radisson Hotels on October 17, 2016. it has however since then disaffiliated itself with Radisson and now operates independently.

Chicken Bone Beach Jazz plays its series at the hotel in the cooler months.

The New Jersey Cannabis Regulatory Commission announced the approval of a new Cannabis dispensary which will be located within the Claridge Hotel, the High Roller Cannabis Dispensary and Lounge will lease space from TJM Properties the property owner with the 10,000 square foot dispensary and lounge located via a separate entrance on the Park Place side of the hotel, the retail dispensary will be on the first floor and the lounge on the second floor. According to the NJCRC, High Rollers will be the first combination cannabis dispensary and lounge in the State of New Jersey. When New Jersey legalized recreational cannabis in 2022 state law prohibited public consumption of cannabis products but with the opening of this new dispensary/lounge that will change to allow on site consumption, other public consumption of cannabis will remain illegal. Renovations including compliance with NJCRC security requirements were completed and the lounge opened to the public in the summer 2023. On August 15, 2023, an additional Cannabis dispensary, Design 710, officially opened in the neighboring Park Place Building.

== See also ==
- Bally's Atlantic City
- List of tallest buildings in Atlantic City

Preceded by Haddon Hall Hotel	Tallest Building in Atlantic City; 1930—1989; 370 ft	Succeeded by Bally's Atlantic City
