= Bally's Atlantic City =

Hotel and casino on the Boardwalk in Atlantic City, New Jersey

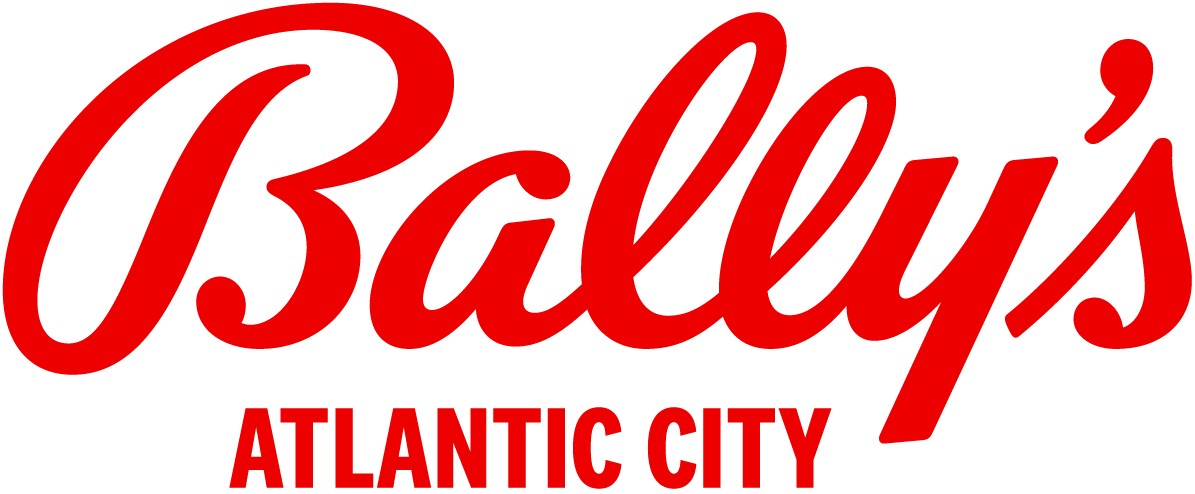

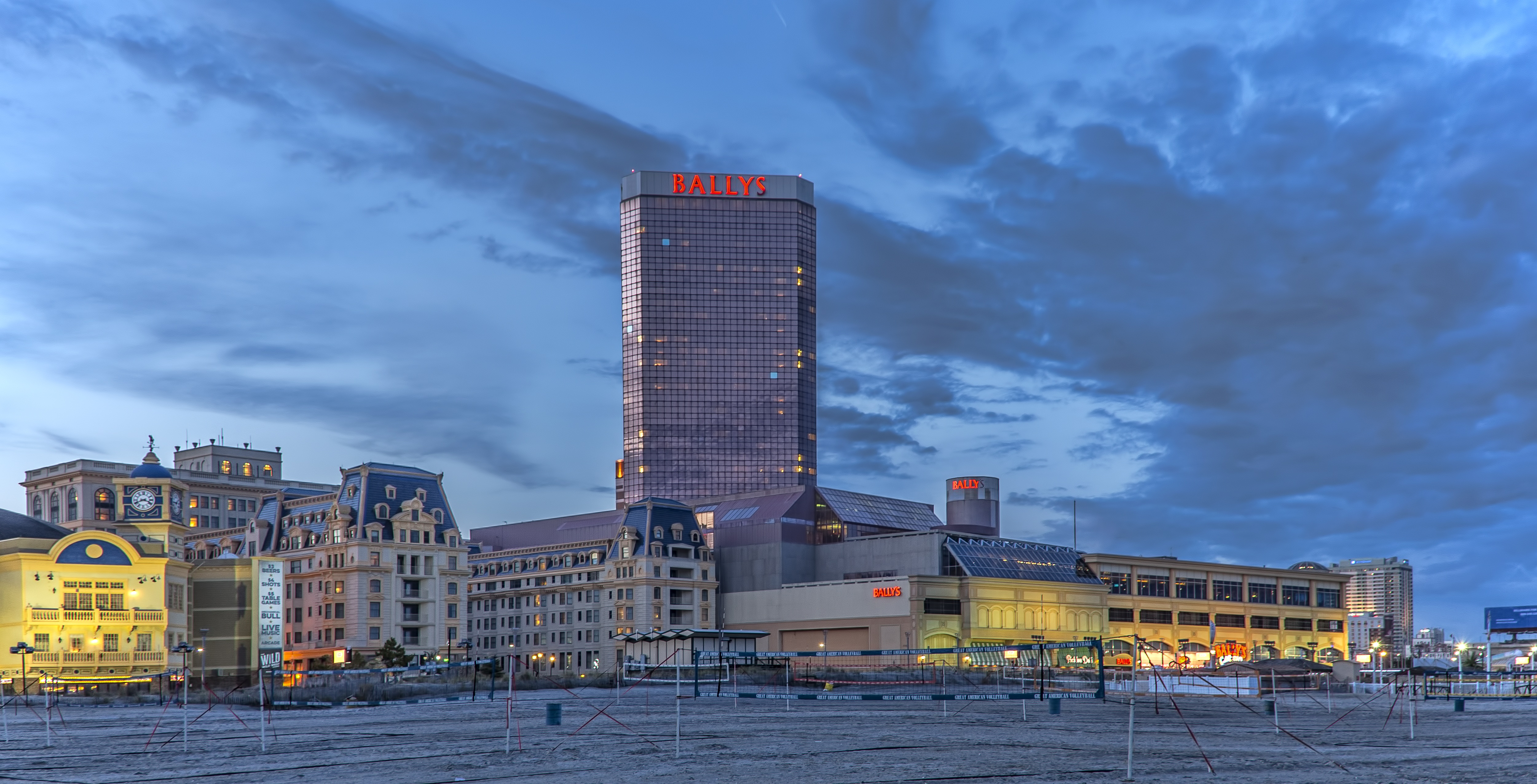
- Bally's from the beach, 2018
- Interactive map of Bally's Atlantic City
- Location: Atlantic City, New Jersey 08401; 1900 Pacific Ave; 39°21′23.4″N 74°25′56.3″W
- Opened: December 29, 1979; 46 years ago
- Theme: Modernism; Formerly Western
- No. of rooms: 1,214
- Gaming space: 83,000 sq ft (7,700 m^{2})
- Signature attractions: Bally’s Beach Bar
- Notable restaurants: Park Place Prime; Jerry Longo’s; Meatballs & Martinis; Casino Cafe & Grille; Macau Kitchen; The Yard; Carluccio's Pizza; Sack o' Subs; Johnny Rockets; Bally's Beach Bar; Dunkin'; Fralinger's Salt Water Taffy
- Casino type: Land-based
- Owner: Bally's Corporation
- Previous names: Bally's Park Place
- Renovated in: 1983, 1994, 2005, 2009, 2015, 2022, 2024
- Website: casinos.ballys.com/atlantic-city

Bally's Atlantic City is a casino hotel on the boardwalk in Atlantic City, New Jersey. It is owned and operated by Bally's Corporation.

The Marlborough-Blenheim Hotel stood on the site before the casino was built. It is famous for its address of "Park Place and the Boardwalk", two locations popularized by the board game Monopoly. Bally's is one of the largest hotels on the boardwalk with nearly 1,169 rooms. Its historic Dennis Tower was constructed in stages between 1906 and 1929.

== History ==
=== First hotels on the site ===
The site now occupied by Bally's was originally the location of two separate hotels: the Marlborough-Blenheim Hotel and the Dennis Hotel.

The Marlborough House was built in 1900 by Josiah White III between Ohio Avenue and Park Place on the Boardwalk, in the Queen Anne style. White expanded the successful resort in 1905, hiring Philadelphia architect William Lightfoot Price of Price and McLanahan to design a new, separate wing, built entirely of concrete, which opened in 1906 as the Blenheim. The hotel was then renamed the Marlborough-Blenheim.

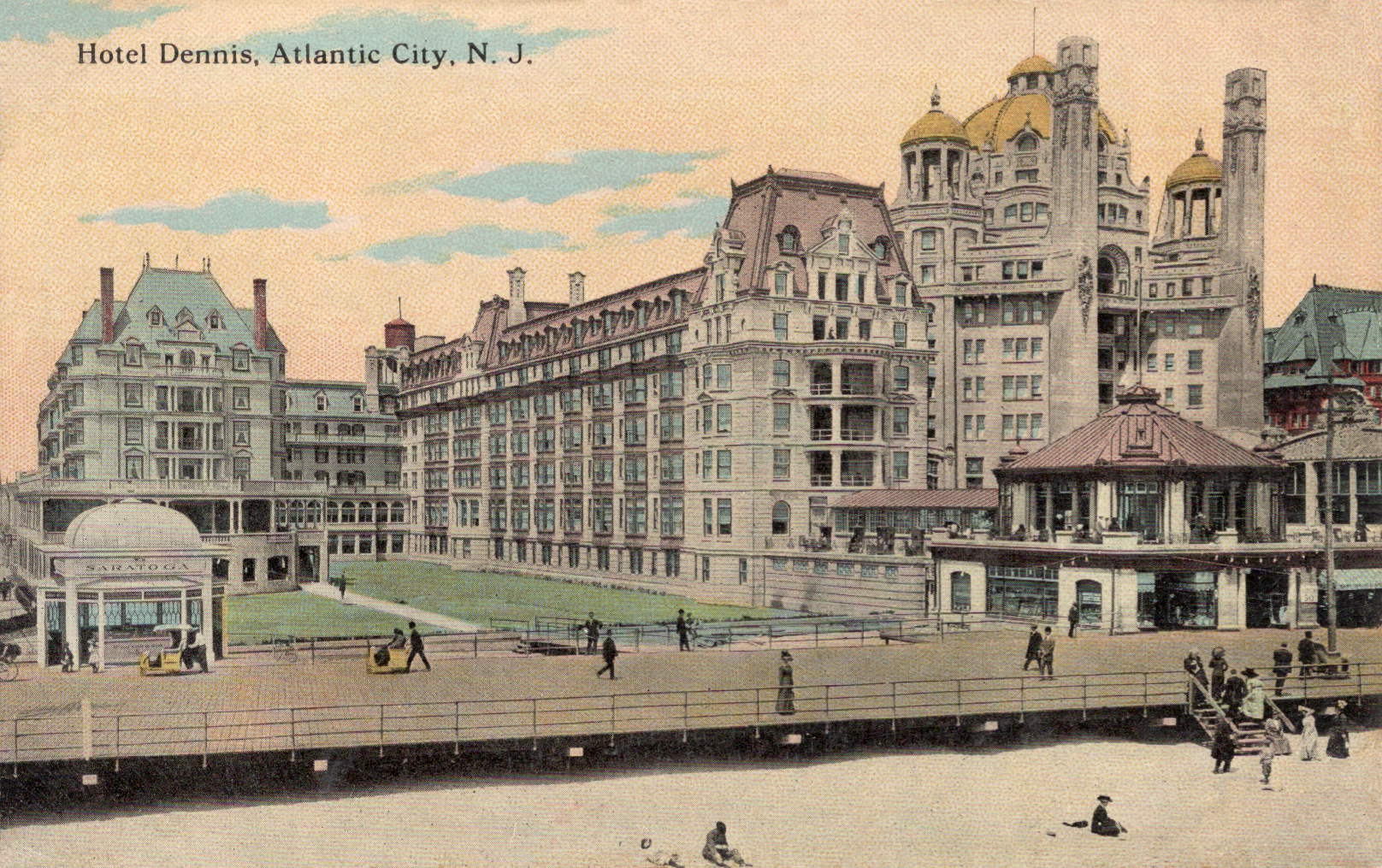
Dennis Hotel, c. 1906, showing 1892 wing on the left and larger 1906 wing on the right, with turrets of the Blenheim behind it

The Dennis Hotel began as a pre-Civil War cottage along Michigan Avenue, built by William Dennis. After the war, it was acquired by Joseph H. Borton, who extended the hotel and then built a large addition in 1892, in the French chateau style. The hotel was sold to Walter Buzby just after the turn of the twentieth century. Buzby hired Philadelphia architect Walter Smedley a fellow Quaker, to design a huge new six-story eastern wing, which was completed in 1906. It is the oldest portion still standing. In 1910, the 1892 Michigan Avenue west wing was demolished and replaced with a larger six-story wing, also designed by Smedley. In 1925, Buzby had Smedley design a huge ten-story rear wing, containing a new lobby and ballrooms, which would connect the eastern and western wings extending to the Boardwalk. In 1929, with Smedley's practice having closed, Buzby hired another Philadelphia Quaker firm, Price and Walton, to design a seven-story addition to the 1910 Michigan Avenue west wing, which extended it seventy feet toward the ocean, bringing it even with the 1906 wing. This gave the Dennis its current form.

Dennis Hotel, 1978, showing 1929 extension on the left, 1925 rear wing and 1906 wing on the right

In 1969, the Buzby family sold the Dennis for $4 million to Gary and Lewis Malamut, owners of the adjacent Shelburne Hotel. When they defaulted on the mortgage in 1975, the hotel was returned to the Buzby family. It was soon after foreclosed by the First National Bank of South Jersey.

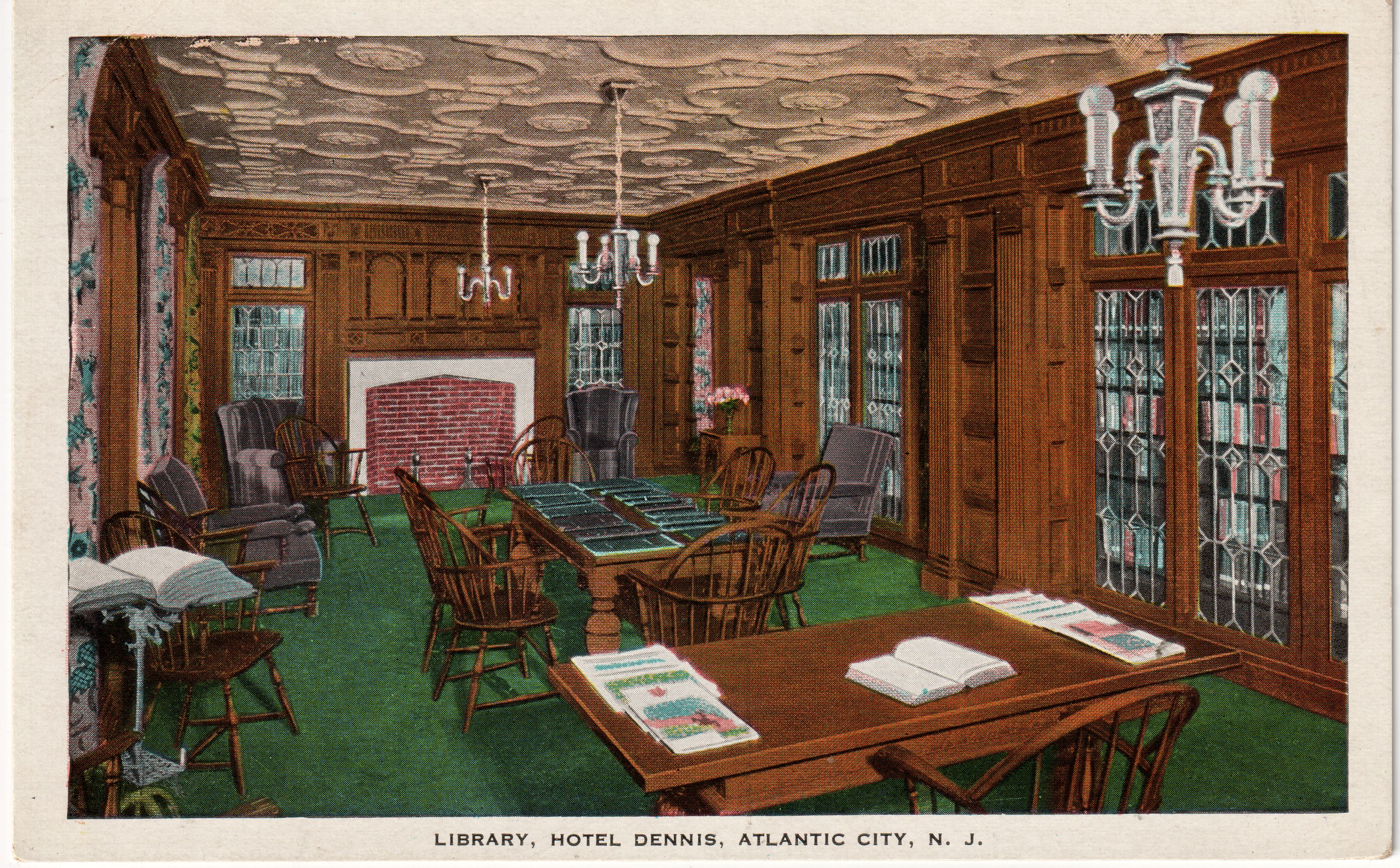
Library, Hotel Dennis, Atlantic City NJ circa 1930s

=== Bally's Park Place (1979–2000) ===
On March 14, 1977, wealthy, flamboyant art dealer Reese Palley and local attorney and businessman Martin Blatt purchased the Marlborough-Blenheim from the White family. They intended to spend $35 million on renovations, preserving the Blenheim wing, while razing the Marlborough to make way for a modern casino hotel. Palley successfully got the Blenheim wing placed on the National Register of Historic Buildings. In June 1977, Bally Manufacturing, the world's largest producer of slot machines, leased the Marlborough-Blenheim from Palley and Blatt for 40 years, with an option for a further 100 years. On August 17, 1977, Bally announced that it had purchased the neighboring Dennis Hotel for $4 million from the First National Bank of South Jersey. On October 25, 1977, Josiah White IV, grandson of the Marlborough-Blenheim's founder, presided over the closure of that hotel, locking its front door.

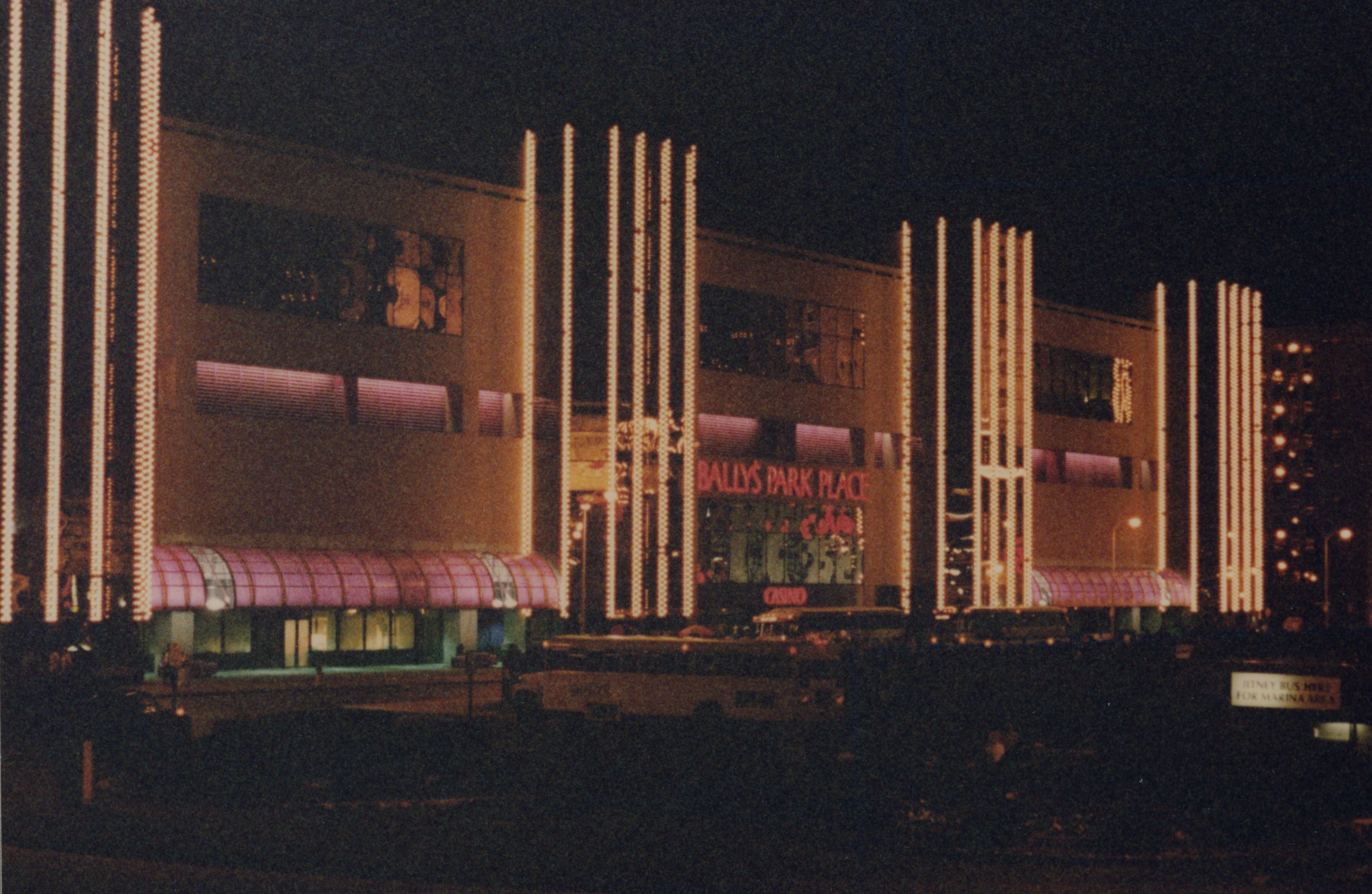
The casino at night, 1984

After Bally took control of the two properties, it announced plans to raze all three hotel buildings - the Marlborough, the Blenheim, and the Dennis, despite protests, to make way for the new "Bally's Park Place Casino and Hotel", an $83 million casino/hotel designed by California-based Maxwell Starkman Associates. The new resort was to have a 39-story, octagonal hotel tower and a huge three-level podium, containing a 75,000 square-foot casino, along with other resort and convention facilities. However, in an effort to offset costs and open the casino as soon as possible, the Dennis Hotel was retained to serve as the temporary hotel for Bally's until a new tower could be built.

In November 1978, Bally demolished the Marlborough-Blenheim and quickly cleared the land to begin building Bally's Park Place Casino. On December 30, 1979, the casino opened with the newly renovated Dennis serving as its hotel. In 1989, Bally constructed a 750-room hotel tower in a modern style, with an exterior of light pink glass. On July 2, 1997, The Wild Wild West Casino was opened as the second casino at Bally's.

The boardwalk entrance to Bally's Casino

=== Bally's Atlantic City (2000–present) ===
In 2000, Bally's Park Place changed its name and became Bally's Atlantic City. The adjacent Claridge Hotel and Casino was purchased and incorporated into Bally's in 2003, and was renamed the Claridge Tower. The casino in the Claridge Tower was named The Ridge. The casino was renovated in 2008 from a standard casino floor to an upscale lounge-casino.

In 2005, Harrah's Entertainment (later Caesars Entertainment) purchased Bally's along with Caesars. In 2008, Harrah's spent $38.5 million to purchase the row of shops between the Dennis Tower and the boardwalk, and then spent a further $23 million to demolish the shops and restore the open plaza, and to restore the facade of the Dennis Tower and renovate its rooms.

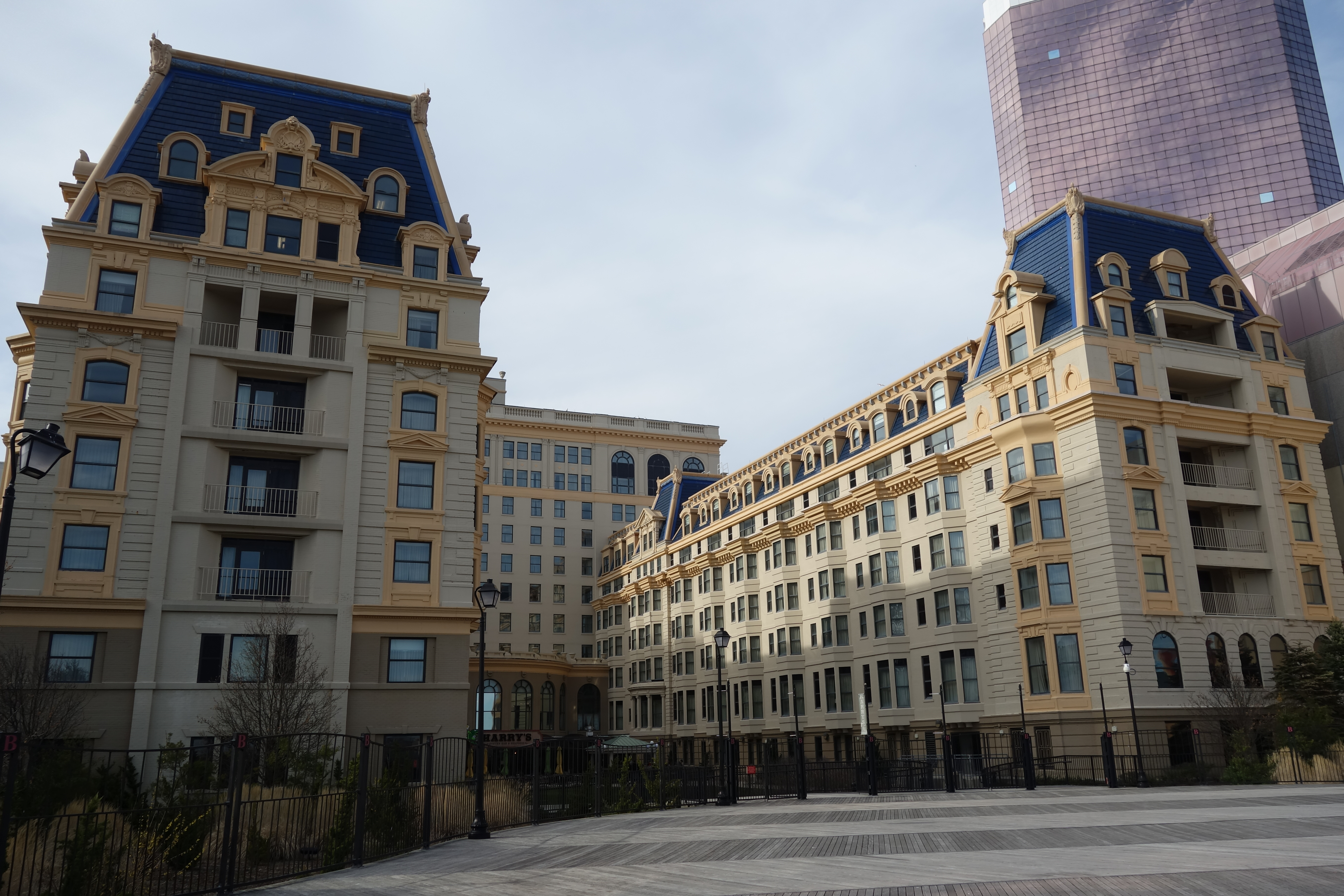
The Dennis Tower wing of Bally's, 2019

In 2012, The Ridge closed its gambling and food amenities. The tower's 500 hotel rooms continued to be used for Bally's guests until it was sold in 2013 to be reopened as the independent Claridge Hotel.

In October 2017, ownership of Bally's was transferred to Vici Properties as part of a corporate spin-off, and the property was leased back to Caesars Entertainment.

In April 2020, Twin River Worldwide Holdings agreed to buy Bally's Atlantic City from Vici; in conjunction, Twin Rivers acquired the right to the Bally's name and renamed itself Bally's Corporation. The deal excluded the Wild Wild West Casino, the operations of which would be transferred to the adjacent Caesars Atlantic City. Twin River also announced that they would acquire a license to give Bally's their own sports book, online sports betting, and I-Gaming. The sale was completed in November 2020.

== Gaming ==
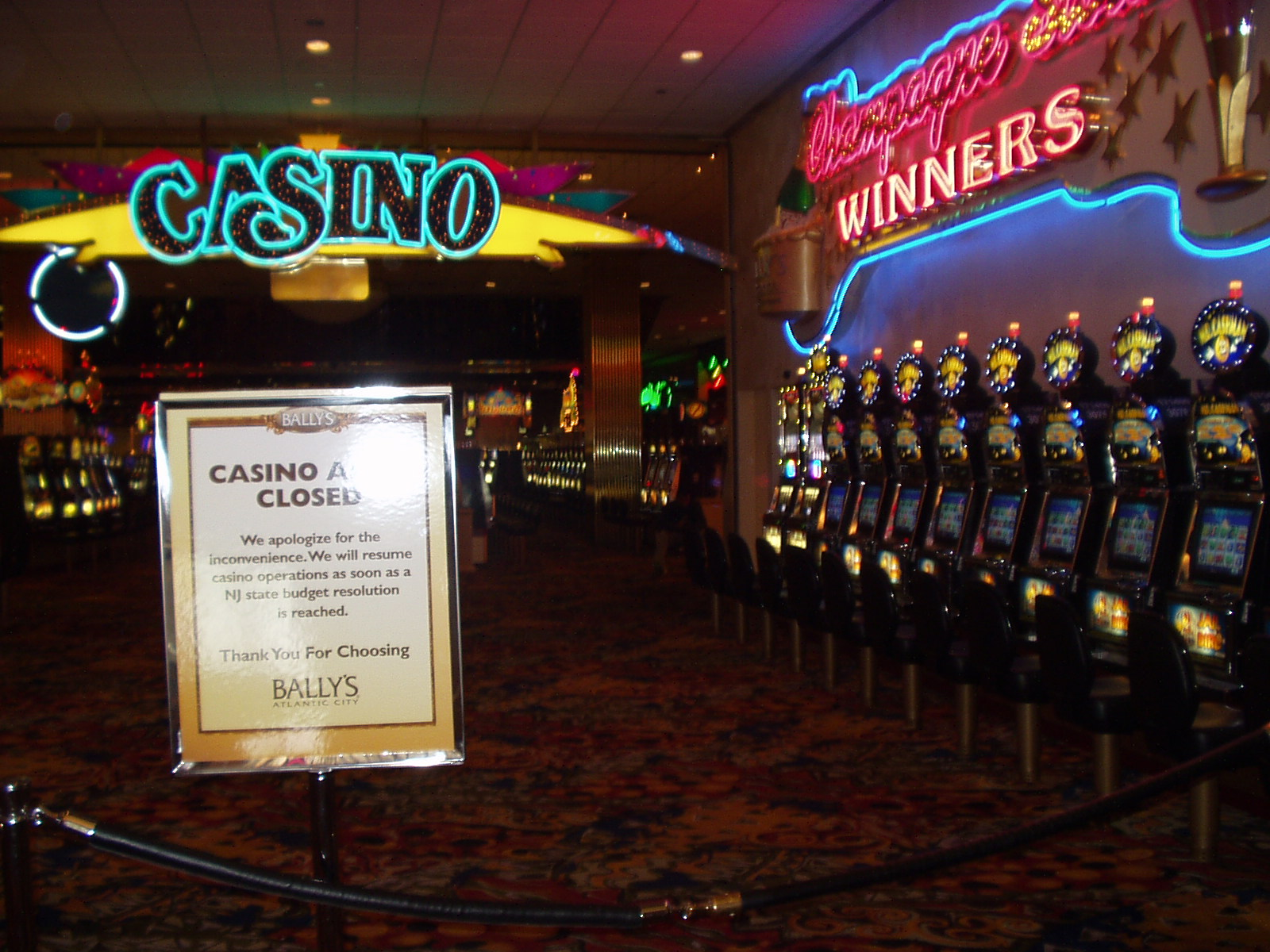
Inside the casino

The casino at Bally's has over 83,000 sq ft (7,700 m^{2}) of gaming space with approximately 1100 slot machines. Table games include Blackjack, Baccarat, Craps, Roulette, and Pai Gow Poker. Specialty games and poker variations known as "Carnival Games" include Let it Ride, Mississippi Stud, 3-Card Poker, 4-Card Poker, Ultimate Texan Hold’em, and High Card Flush. Recent developments include games which combine the features of live table games with those of slot machines: The multi-player Roulette automatically spins the ball, but the bet and payout function is mostly handle by computerized video terminals for each player. A similar multi-player machine throws a pair of large craps dice. Bally's also has Bally Bet sportsbook which offers sports betting. As provided by local and state law, there are scattered areas where smoking is permitted, totaling 25% of the official gaming space. (Aside from this exception, smoking is banned by law throughout the rest of the casino and hotel). Under New Jersey law, persons under 21 years of age are not permitted to gamble. They may only pass through the main aisles of the casino when accompanied by someone over 21 years old to cross between hotel areas and exits, and may not stop or slow down to observe the games.

Up until February 2021, Bally's Atlantic City participated along with other Caesars Entertainment properties in the "Caesars Rewards" loyalty program for their players, guests, and other customers. Rewards were based on casino play, food/beverage/retail/hotel room/entertainment purchases, and other factors. There were four tiers of membership, increasing in status: Gold, Platinum, Diamond, and Seven Star.

After the sale of Bally's to Bally's Corporation, formerly Twin River Worldwide Holdings, Bally's has since transitioned to its own loyalty program — Bally Rewards.

== Events ==
=== Sports ===
Boxing matches are held at the casino.

== Hotel towers ==
Bally's Tower, Dennis Tower, Garden Tower (Currently not in use.)

== See also ==
- Gambling in New Jersey
- List of integrated resorts

Preceded by Claridge Atlantic City	Tallest Building in Atlantic City; 1989—1990; 375 ft	Succeeded by Trump Taj Mahal
