= Resorts Casino Hotel =

Hotel and casino in Atlantic City, New Jersey

Coordinates: 39.3595°N 74.4222°W

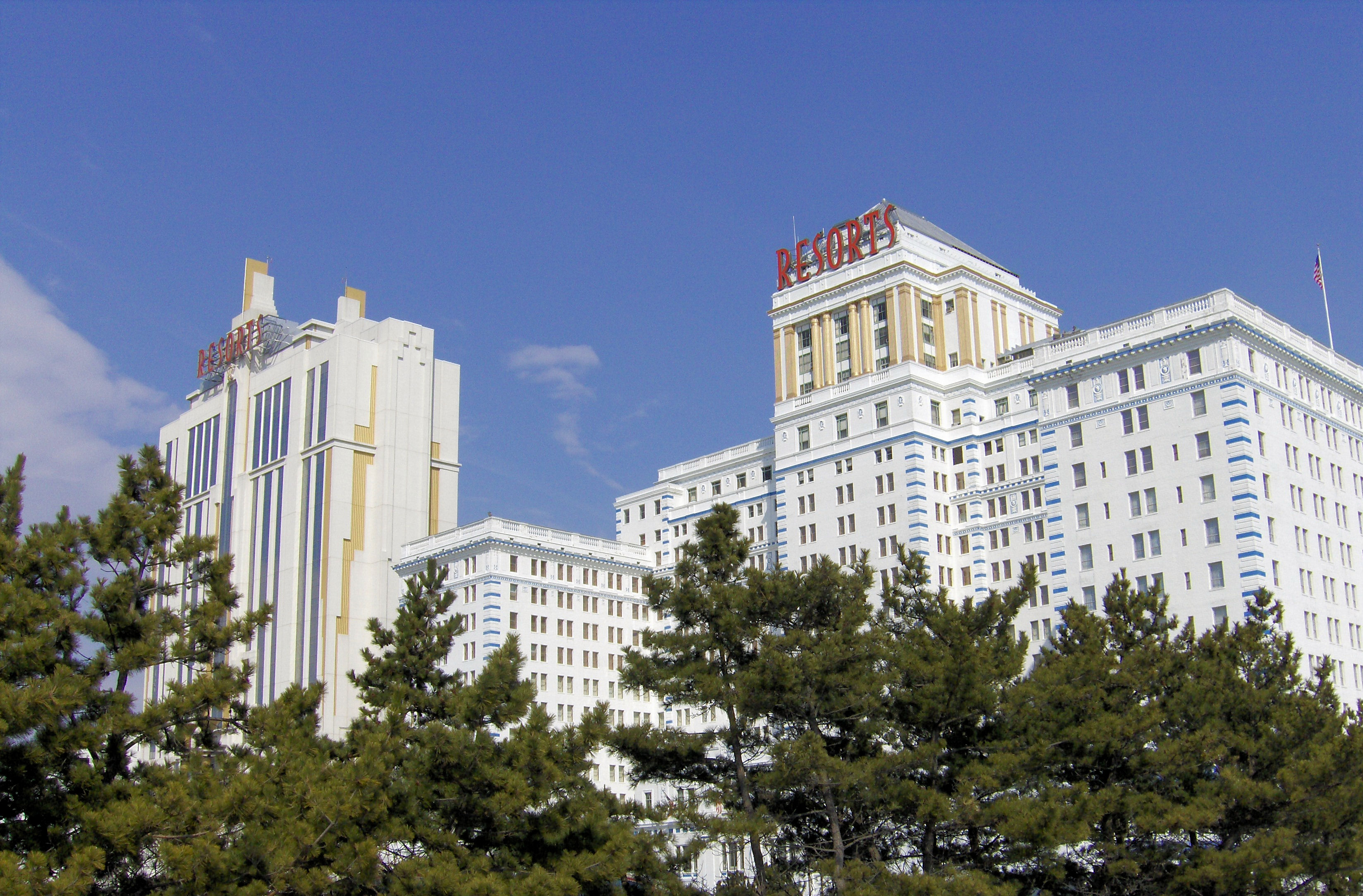
- The two hotel towers at Resorts
- Interactive map of Resorts Casino Hotel
- Location: Atlantic City, New Jersey, U.S.; 1133 Boardwalk, Atlantic City, New Jersey, U.S.
- Opened: July 2, 1904 (hotel, as Chalfonte-Haddon Hall); May 26, 1978; 48 years ago (casino)
- Theme: Roaring Twenties
- No. of rooms: 942
- Gaming space: 100,000 sq ft (9,300 m^{2})
- Permanent shows: Various
- Signature attractions: Platinum Place Slots
- Notable restaurants: Capriccio Dougherty’s Steakhouse & Raw Bar Eastwind Jimmy Buffett's Margaritaville
- Casino type: Land-based
- Owner: DGMB Casinos
- Previous names: Chalfonte-Haddon Hall; Resorts International Casino; Resorts Atlantic City
- Renovated in: 1998, 2002, 2011, 2016
- Website: www.resortsac.com

Resorts Casino Hotel is a hotel and casino in Atlantic City, New Jersey. Resorts brought gaming to Atlantic City in 1978 as the first American casino outside Nevada when it opened in 1978. The resort completed an expansion in 2004, adding the 27-story Rendezvous Tower, and underwent renovations in 2011, converting the resort to a Roaring Twenties theme.

The Resorts site was originally occupied by two three-story wooden Quaker rooming houses, The Chalfonte House and The Haddon House.

== History ==
=== First hotels on the site ===
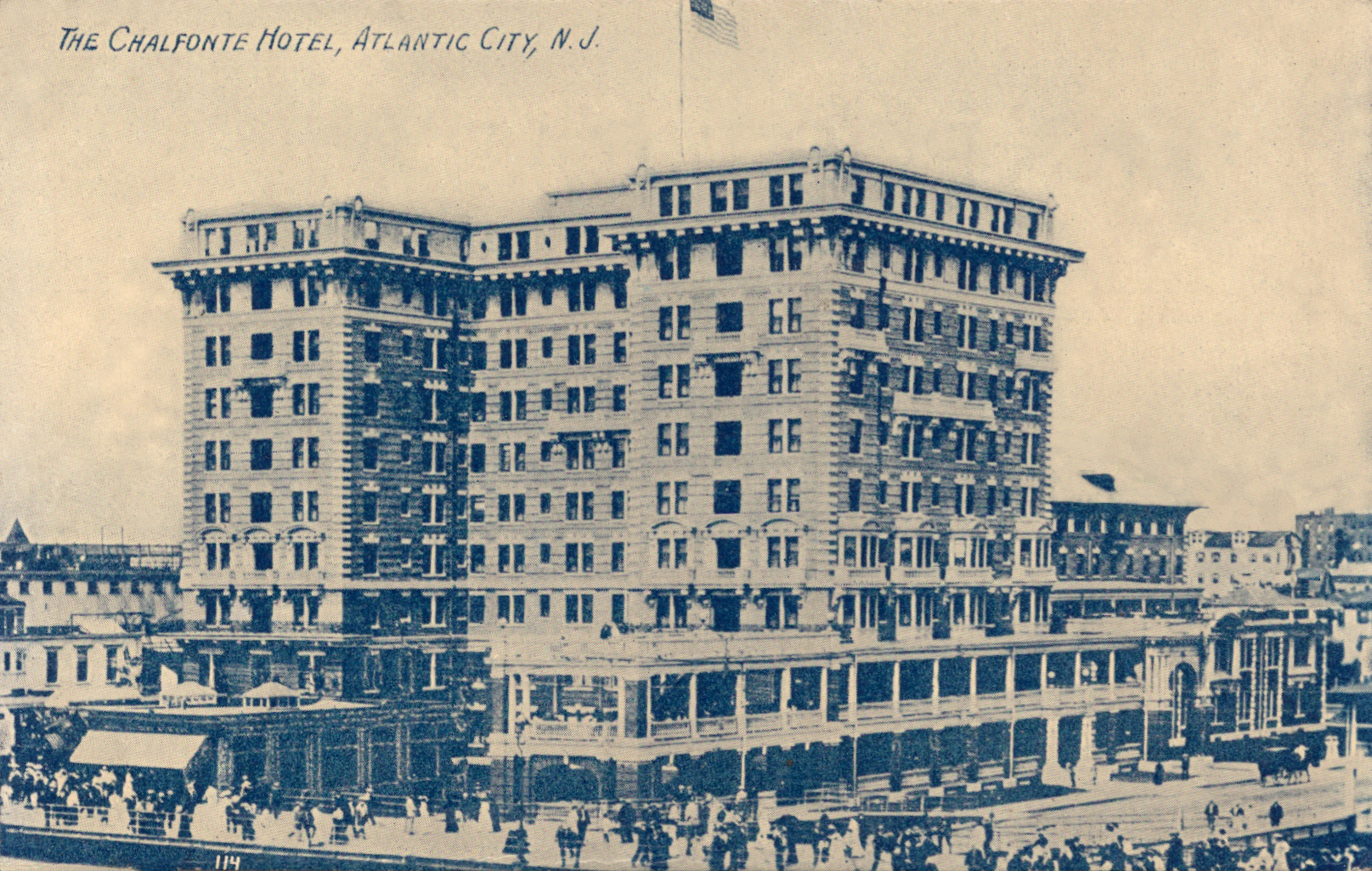
Chalfonte Hotel

The Chalfonte House was built in 1868 by Elisha and Elizabeth Roberts. They had purchased a plot of land at North Carolina Avenue and Pacific Avenue from John DaCosta for $6,500. The hotel was constructed during the winter for a cost of $21,000 and could accommodate 140 guests. They named the hotel for Chalfont St Giles, the town in Buckinghamshire where William Penn is buried. The Chalfonte House was expanded and moved oceanward twice, in 1879 and 1889.

The Haddon House was opened across the street, on the current Resorts site, by Samuel and Susanna Hunt in 1869. They named the hotel for the Quaker family who had founded Haddonfield, New Jersey. It was sold to Leeds & Lippincott in 1890. In 1896, they rebuilt The Haddon House at a cost of $200,000, naming the new, larger hotel "Haddon Hall".

Henry Leeds bought The Chalfonte House in 1900 and constructed a modern hotel on the site, the Chalfonte Hotel. This eight-story, $1 million brick building, Atlantic City's first skyscraper, was designed by architect Addison Hutton (1834—1916), and opened its doors to guests on July 2, 1904.

=== Current Haddon Hall building ===
Haddon Hall Hotel

The current Haddon Hall building was constructed in stages in the 1920s. The 11-story wing facing the Boardwalk was constructed first, with the 15-story center and 11-story rear wings added later in the decade. Soon after the modern Haddon Hall was completed, it was merged by Leeds & Lippincott with the adjacent Chalfonte via a skyway, which still exists and can be seen today.

The new Chalfonte-Haddon Hall complex consisted of 1,000 rooms and, at the time of its completion, was the city's largest hotel by capacity. During World War II, under the command of Col. Robert C. McDonald, M.C. (November 27, 1943—June 30, 1944), Chalfonte-Haddon Hall was leased by the US Military as part of Army Air Force Basic Training Center No. 7. The forty-seven Atlantic City resort hotels taken over by the United States Military were collectively dubbed "Camp Boardwalk". The Chalfonte-Haddon Hall was merged with the adjacent Traymore Hotel and the complex was named the England General Hospital, for Lt. Col. Thomas Marcus England, who had worked with Walter Reed researching yellow fever in Cuba in 1900. The hospital opened on April 28, 1944. The last patients left the hospital in June 1946, and the Chalfonte-Haddon Hall was returned to its owners, reopening as a resort on August 1, 1946.

The resort became the location of many conventions. The first meeting of the Section on Surgery of the American Academy of Pediatrics was held in the Chalfonte-Haddon Hall on November 21, 1948. President Nixon spoke in front of the Chalfonte-Haddon Hall Hotel on June 22, 1971.

=== Conversion to Resorts International ===
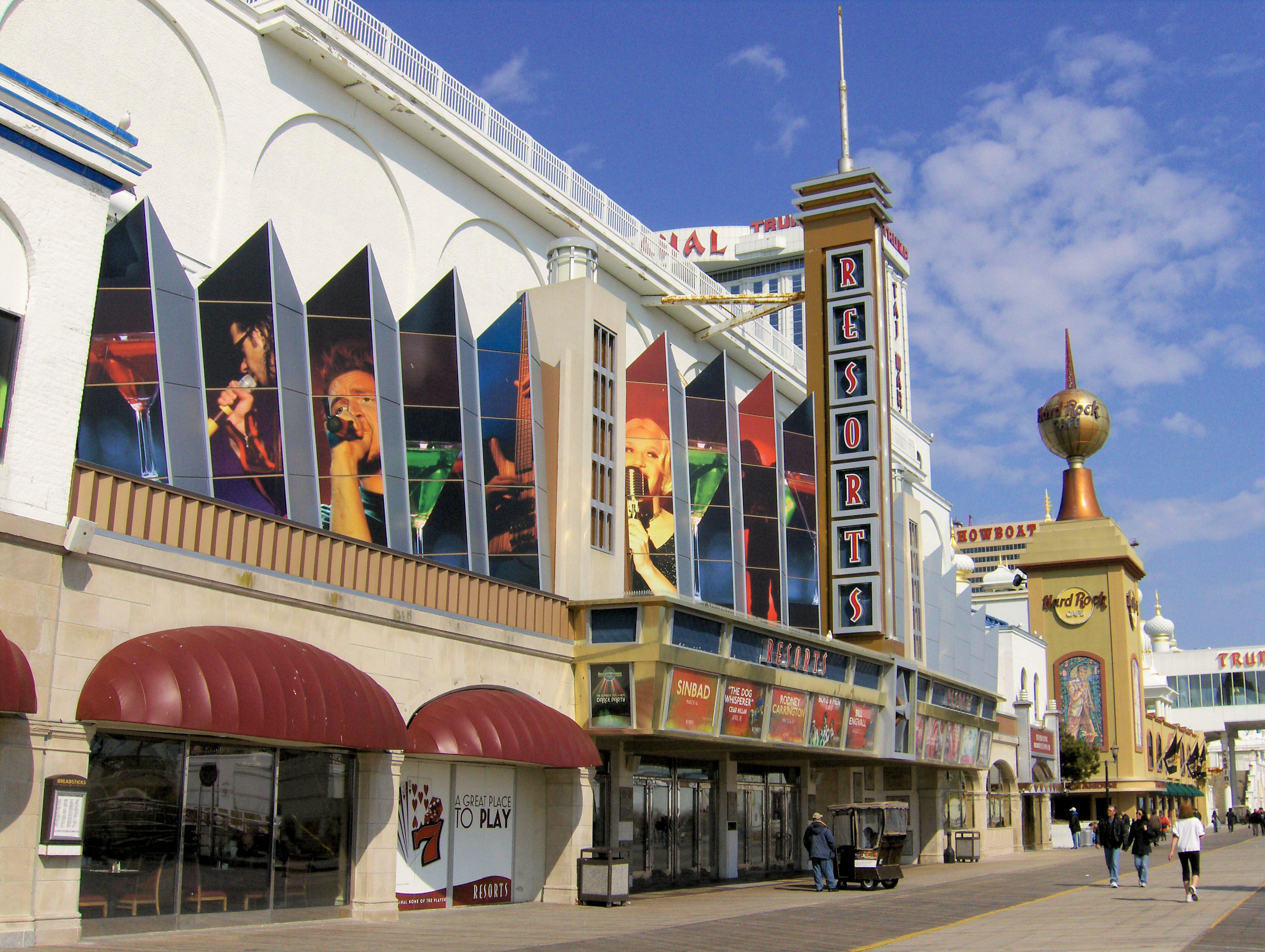
Boardwalk entrance to Resorts

Resorts International, which was formed in March 1968, first became interested in developing a resort in Atlantic City after the company learned of a planned fourth attempt to bring casino gambling to New Jersey by limiting it to Atlantic City. The company heavily contributed to the November 1976 gaming referendum which successfully passed that year.

While campaigning for the gaming initiative, Resorts International also began planning for a future Atlantic City casino by securing an option for 55 acres (220,000 m^{2}) of land on the Atlantic City Boardwalk from the city's Housing and Re-Development Authority as well as acquiring Leeds & Lippincott Company, which owned Chalfonte-Haddon Hall. Resorts purchased 67 percent of Leeds & Lippincott Inc. in August 1976, and completed the acquisition the following month, paying a total of $2.489 million.

Resorts International reduced the 1,000 rooms at Chalfonte-Haddon Hall to 566 by closing the older, smaller Chalfonte building due to the rooms being impossible to expand to the city's room requirements. The Haddon Hall was easier to convert, and space was available in the building to allow for a casino, restaurants, shops and a showroom. The company's logic in the decision to use Haddon Hall was that renovating an existing property on the boardwalk would give the company an advantage by allowing the resort to be open at least a year before its new-build competition, as well as being less expensive to construct. Though state leaders preferred companies to build new resorts rather than renovating existing properties, as Resorts International was the first casino project developed in New Jersey, the company was encouraged by the governor. This would not be the case with the later resorts built on the Boardwalk. Chalfonte-Haddon Hall was first briefly renamed The Palace Hotel in May 1977, before being again renamed Resorts International Hotel on July 1, 1977.

=== Resorts International opening ===
Resorts International's new casino opened its doors at 10:00 am on May 26, 1978. Initial gaming laws in New Jersey only allowed casinos to operate for 18 hours during the week and 20 hours during the weekends. This situation produced massive lines outside of Resorts, and people waited hours to get inside after Governor Brendan Byrne cut the ceremonial opening ribbon. The first acts in the hotel's then-1700-seat Super Star Theater were Steve Lawrence and Eydie Gorme, with Lawrence throwing out the first dice roll at one of the casino's craps tables.

=== Ownership changes ===
Despite the initial success of its flagship Atlantic City property, Resorts International struggled to compete with its competition as more casinos were developed on the boardwalk. Newer and more extravagant resorts began to erode market share and interest in the property during the 1980s, and Resorts International added to the problem by not making any significant upgrades to the property. Instead, the company focused on expanding its operations in the market by announcing in the mid-1980s its plans to develop a new property in Atlantic City called the Taj Mahal Casino. Financial difficulties, however, prevented Resorts International from ever completing the Taj Mahal project, and in 1987 the company became a takeover target when Donald Trump purchased a controlling block of Resorts International stock.

After the death of James M. Crosby, Trump made an offer to all remaining Resorts International shareholders in late 1987 to buy all of the remaining outstanding shares of the company's stock that he did not already control. Trump was challenged for control of the company in early 1988, though, when Merv Griffin, through his Griffin Gaming & Entertainment company, also made a bid for all of the stock in Resorts International. After a two-month battle for control of the company, Trump and Griffin finally reached an agreement to divide the company's holdings between them. Trump would receive the stalled Taj Mahal Casino, while Griffin would receive ownership of both Resorts Atlantic City and Resorts Paradise Island in the Bahamas. The casino later became the location of filming for Merv Griffin's variety/game show Ruckus.

In the deal Trump acquired three Sikorsky S-61 helicopters that belonged to Resorts International Airlines (RIA) used to shuttle high rollers to the casino. The three green and orange helicopters were repainted black and red and emblazoned with the Trump Air logo and became the basis for Trump's foray into the airline industry. Trump at the time said the helicopters "were the same model used by the President of the United States."

After the conclusion of the deal between Griffin and Trump, Griffin spent $90 million making improvements to Resorts Atlantic City, while selling the Paradise Island property to Sun International Hotels. Griffin later sold the remainder of Griffin Gaming and Entertainment in 1998 to Sun International Hotels for $350 million. Sun International was headed by Sol Kerzner, and under his leadership the company planned a $500 million revamping of the property after completing the purchase. However, the company only completed a $48 million expansion and renovation to Resorts Atlantic City in 1999 before refocusing its efforts on its other international properties. In 2001, Sun International sold the property to Colony Capital for $140 million; less than half of the cost the company originally paid to buy the property.

On December 10, 2009, it was announced that Resorts International was not able to pay the mortgage for more than a year for the Atlantic City property and made a deal to have the loan canceled and surrender the property to RAC Atlantic City Holdings L.L.C. (which is owned by the lenders, Wells Fargo and others). In 2010, former Tropicana Casino and Resorts President Dennis Gomes announced the Trop's intentions to purchase Resorts Atlantic City for $35 million in cash from the lenders who took over after Colony Capital defaulted. The casino was taken over by DGMB Casinos, a company headed by Dennis Gomes, in December 2010, days before the casino was scheduled to shut down.

=== Renovation and re-branding ===
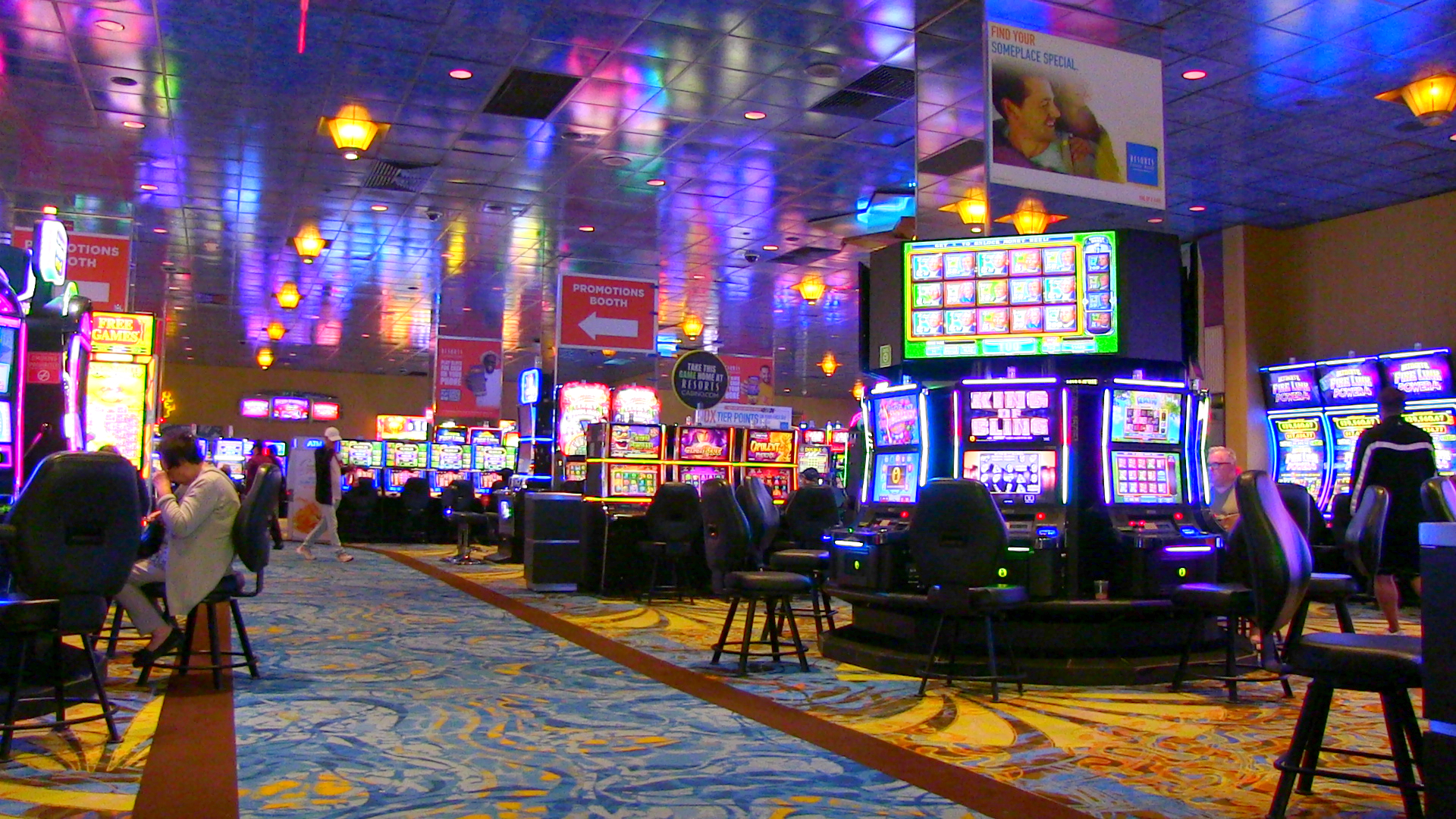
Casino

In October 2010, a plan was revealed to transform the resort into a Roaring Twenties theme. The re-branding was proposed by current owner Dennis Gomes and was initiated in December 2010 when he took over the casino. It capitalized on the success of the HBO series Boardwalk Empire, and changes accentuate the resort's existing art deco design, as well as present new 1920s-era uniforms for employees and music from the time period. The casino also introduced drinks and shows reminiscent of the period.

In May 2011, Resorts became the first casino in Atlantic City to market itself to LGBT customers. The resort opened "Prohibition", the city's first gay casino nightclub, as well as hired a director of LGBT marketing.

In July 2011, a five-year lease was signed with the New Jersey Sports and Exposition Authority, owner of the Monmouth Park Racetrack in Oceanport, New Jersey, to provide a marketing partnership between the casino and racetrack. The agreement allowed Resorts to rename the Haskell Invitational Resorts Casino & Hotel Haskell Invitational, and possibilities included a merging of loyalty programs as well as bringing entertainers' appearances at the casino to the racetrack. The program was part of a strategy to mesh horse racing with casino gambling.

Resorts announced an agreement in August 2012 for Mohegan Gaming & Entertainment (formerly Mohegan Tribal Gaming Authority), operator of the Mohegan Sun, to take over management of the casino and hotel. This partnership expired on January 1st, 2025, and now Resorts Casino Hotel operates independently.

Following a Supreme Court ruling in 2018 and passage of a New Jersey law legalizing sports betting, Resorts announced deals with DraftKings and SBTech to open a sportsbook on-property, online, and via mobile devices.

== Hotel towers ==
=== Ocean Tower ===
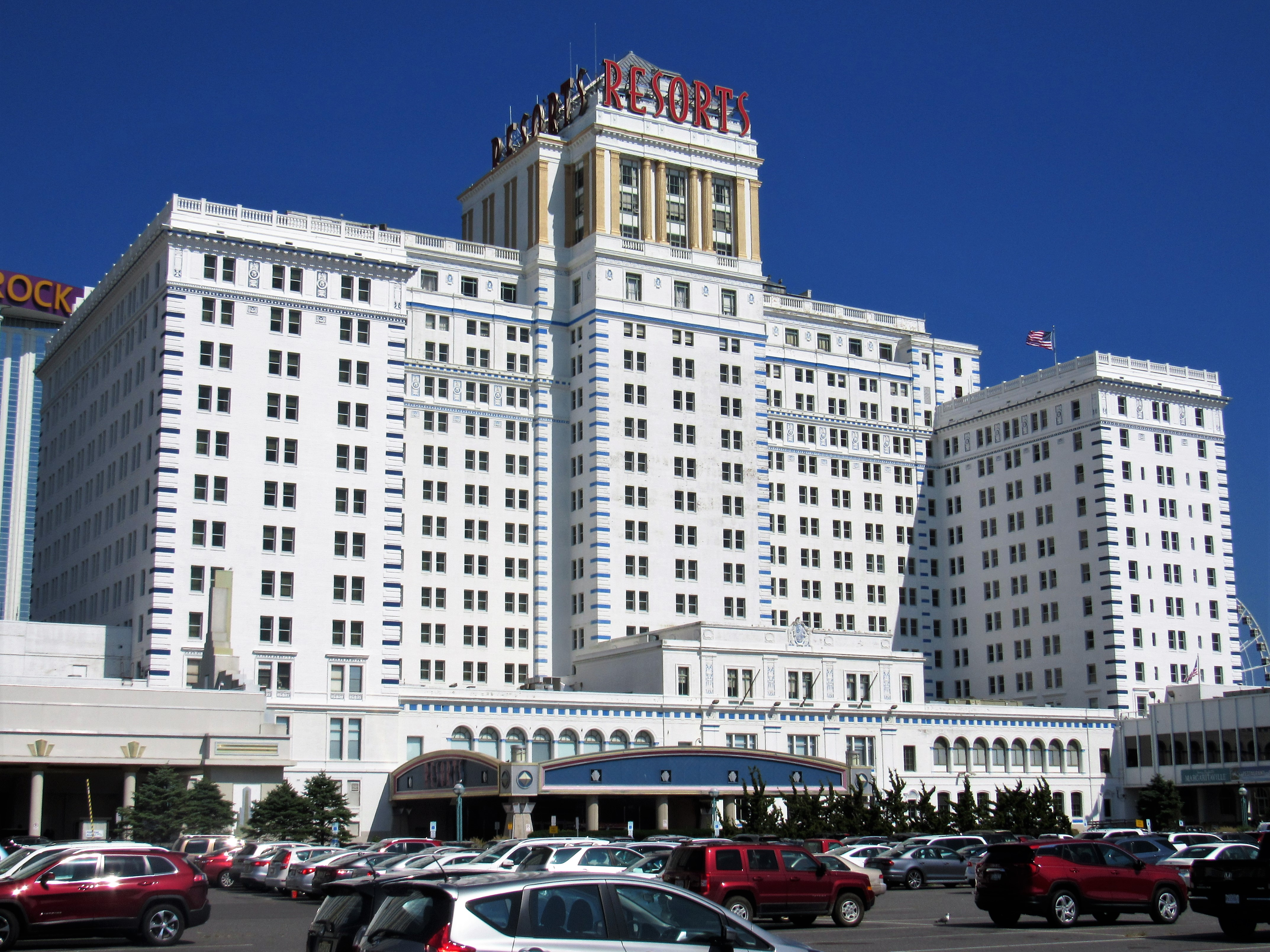
The Ocean Tower was built as an expansion of the original 1904 hotel in 1927.

Built in 1927, the 260 ft (79 m) tall Ocean Tower is the original Haddon Hall Hotel building and contains 480 guest rooms. The base of the tower is home to the main casino floor, spa, pool, and the main retail and dining level. It also contains a 350-seat theater and clubs reserved for qualified casino players; formerly there was one club called "1133", but in 2013 it was remodeled and expanded into two separate players clubs named the "Epic" and "Paramount" clubs. Also as of 2013, this building houses an online gaming room, a "Margaritaville" casino section of the casino floor, as well as a "Margaritaville" restaurant.

=== Rendezvous Tower ===
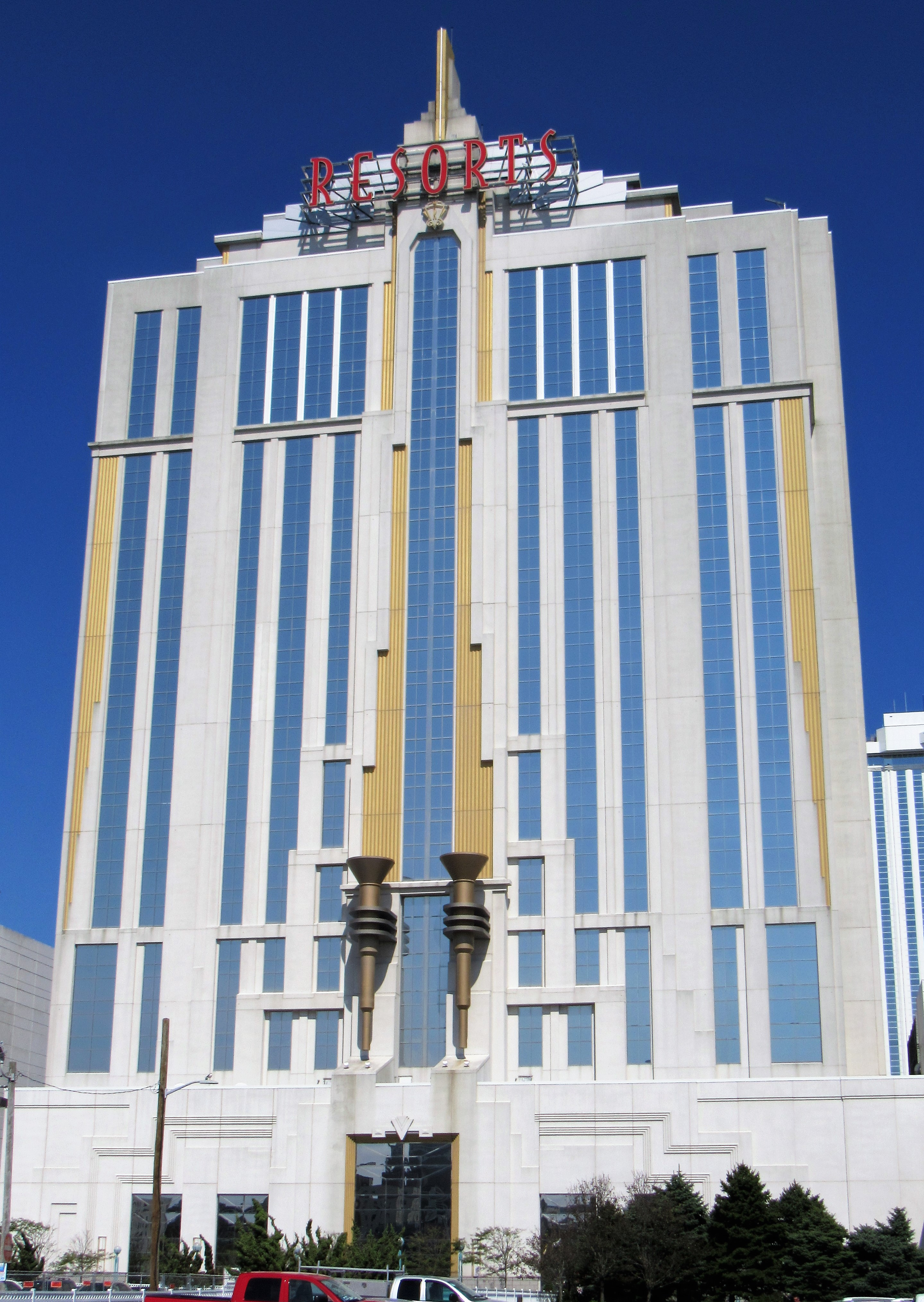
The Rendezvous Tower opened as an expansion to the hotel-casino in 2004

The 459-room Rendezvous Tower was built on the site of a smaller hotel tower for the casino. The Rendezvous Tower, whose rooms were designed by Bergman Walls Associates, opened in 2004. The tower contains 357 luxury rooms and 42 suites. Combined with the property's existing 480 rooms, Resorts total room inventory was boosted to 942 rooms after it was completed. The tower's exterior features an Art Deco design that was part of a "return to the classics" theme which Colony Capital implemented for the property. The new tower is part of an expansion of the casino and the introduction of several new restaurants.

== Meetings and Entertainment ==
Resorts Superstar Theater

The 1300-capacity Resorts Superstar Theater first opened as a movie theater in 1931 and opened in 1978 as the main live venue at Casino. It has hosted acts such as Frank Sinatra, Dolly Parton, Cher, The Beach Boys, Stevie Wonder, Barry Manilow and Aretha Franklin. The theater can accommodate up to a 600 persons classroom, 850 guests for a banquet and 1,300 for a meeting or performance.

Horizon Ballroom

The Horizon Ballroom is one of Resorts’ most popular venues featuring panoramic views of the boardwalk and ocean with two walls of floor to ceiling windows allowing an abundance of natural light. The Horizon Ballroom can accommodate 220 attendees for a classroom meeting or 250 guests for a banquet.

Atlantic Ballroom

A 12,000 square-foot facility ideal for meetings, banquets and high-tech conferences. Its 12 conference rooms are equipped with superior bandwidth to handle more than 1000 meeting attendees using their devices simultaneously, as well as screen-sharing with

colleagues in remote locations. Each room has built-in 90” LED 1080P monitors, and most have cinema-quality DLP projection with oversized drop-down screens.

Ocean Ballroom

The Ocean Ballroom is Resorts largest ballroom with floor to ceiling windows facing the boardwalk and ocean. This ballroom can accommodate up to 1,000 guests and 85 exhibits. Perfect for weddings, large conferences, banquet events.

Starlight Ballroom

Recently renovated, the Starlight Ballroom is a historic room with two stages and intricately carved walls and vaulted ceilings throughout, with windows allowing natural light.

== Resorts Superstar Theater ==
The 1300-capacity Resorts Superstar Theater first opened as a movie theater in 1931 and opened in 1978 as the main live venue at Casino. It has hosted acts such as Frank Sinatra, Dolly Parton, Cher, The Beach Boys, Stevie Wonder, Barry Manilow and Aretha Franklin.

== See also ==
- Gambling in New Jersey
- List of tallest buildings in Atlantic City
- List of integrated resorts

Preceded by Ritz-Carlton	Tallest Building in Atlantic City; 1929–1930; 260 ft	Succeeded by The Claridge
