= List of casinos in New Jersey =

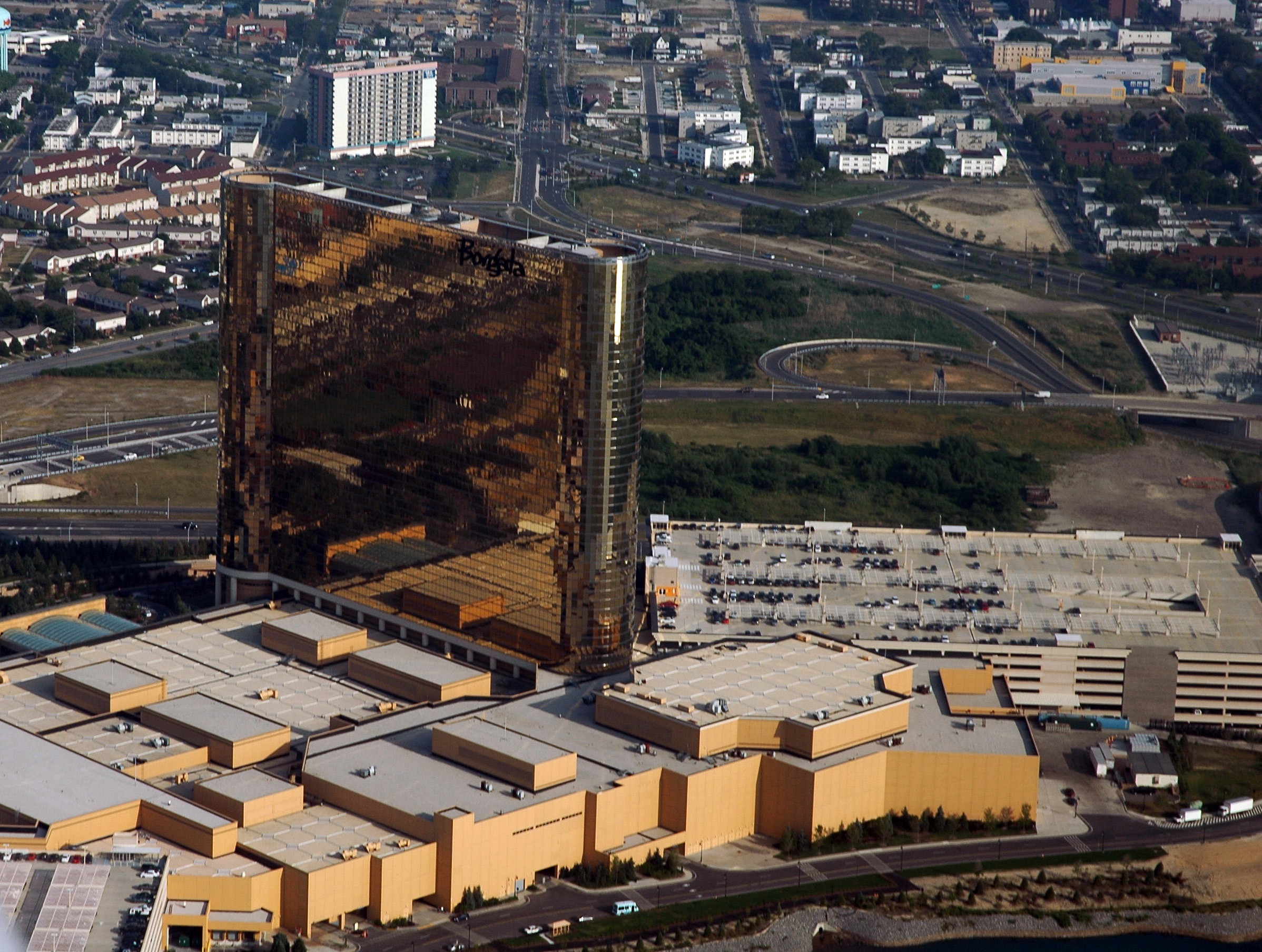
Borgata

This is a list of casinos in New Jersey.

== List of casinos ==
=== Current casinos ===
Casino	Opening Date	Theme	Hotel Rooms	Section of Atlantic City
Bally's	December 29, 1979	Modern	1,169	Midtown
Borgata	July 2, 2003	Tuscany	2,767	Marina
Caesars	June 26, 1979	Roman Empire	1,141	Midtown
Golden Nugget	June 19, 1985	Gold Rush Era	717	Marina
Hard Rock	April 2, 1990	Rock and roll	1,971	Uptown
Harrah's	November 27, 1980	Marina Waterfront	2,587	Marina
Ocean	April 2, 2012	Ocean	1,399	Uptown
Resorts	May 28, 1978	Roaring Twenties	942	Uptown
Tropicana	November 26, 1981	Old Havana	2,364	Downbeach

- The Wild Wild West Casino was officially part of Bally's (1997-2020), now Caesars (2020-), and is a multi-purpose entertainment venue offering shopping, live entertainment, and sports betting, but not a casino.

=== Renamed casinos ===
Casino	Name Change
ACH Casino Resort	Renamed Atlantic Club Casino Hotel
Atlantic City Hilton	Renamed ACH Casino Resort
Bally's Grand	Renamed The Grand
Brighton Casino	Renamed Sands Atlantic City
Del Webb's Claridge	Renamed Claridge
Golden Nugget (Original)	Renamed Bally's Grand
Harrah's at Trump Plaza	Renamed Trump Plaza
Playboy Hotel and Casino	Permanent casino license denied; renamed Atlantis Casino
Revel Atlantic City	Renamed Ocean Casino Resort
The Grand	Renamed the Atlantic City Hilton
Trump's Castle	Renamed Trump Marina
Trump Marina	Renamed Golden Nugget

=== Closed casinos ===
Casino	Opening Date	Closing Date	Status of Property
Atlantic Club Casino Hotel	December 12, 1980	January 13, 2014	Building and contents sold to Caesars Entertainment, slots and tables sold to Tropicana Casino & Resort Atlantic City; currently uninhabited
Atlantis Hotel and Casino	1984	May 22, 1989	License revoked; later became the Trump World's Fair
The Claridge Casino and Hotel	July 20, 1981	February 24, 2014	Merged into Bally's, then sold and reopened as a non-casino hotel
Playboy Hotel and Casino	April 14, 1981	1984	Became Atlantis Hotel and Casino
Revel	April 2, 2012	September 1, 2014	Reopened in 2018 as Ocean Casino Resort
Sands	August 31, 1980	November 11, 2006	Building demolished; currently a vacant lot
Showboat	April 2, 1987	August 31, 2014	Reopened as a non-casino hotel/resort on July 8, 2016
Trump Plaza	May 26, 1984	September 16, 2014	Building demolished February 17, 2021
Trump Taj Mahal	April 2, 1990	October 10, 2016	Reopened in 2018 as Hard Rock
Trump World's Fair	May 15, 1996	October 3, 1999	Building demolished; currently a vacant lot

=== Canceled casinos ===
Casino	Status of property
Camelot	Canceled; currently an empty lot
Dunes Atlantic City	Never completed; currently part of Stockton University Atlantic City campus.
Hilton (Original)	Casino license denied; current site of Golden Nugget Atlantic City
Le Jardin	Canceled; currently Borgata
Margaritaville Marina Casino	Canceled; current site of Golden Nugget Atlantic City
MGM Grand Atlantic City	Canceled; currently an empty lot
Mirage Atlantic City	Canceled; currently Borgata
Penthouse Casino	Never completed; current site of Trump Plaza's East Tower
Pinnacle Atlantic City	Canceled; currently an empty lot
Sahara Atlantic City	Canceled; currently a parking lot

=== Online casinos ===
Online Brand	Land-based partner	Launch Date
888 Casino	Caesars	November 21, 2013
Betfair	Golden Nugget	November 21, 2013
BetAmerica	Golden Nugget	February 2, 2019
BetMGM Casino	Borgata	August, 2017
betPARX	Ocean	2020
Borgata Casino	Borgata	November 21, 2013
Caesars Casino	Caesars	November 21, 2013
DraftKings	Resorts	December 20, 2018
Golden Nugget Casino	Golden Nugget	December 13, 2013
Harrah's Casino	Caesars	November 21, 2013
Hard Rock	Hard Rock	June, 2018
Mohegan Sun	Resorts	July 20, 2015
Ocean Online Casino	Ocean	2018
Pala Casino	Borgata	November 17, 2014
PartyPoker	Borgata	November 21, 2013
PokerStars	Resorts	March 16, 2016
PlayMGM	Borgata	August 1, 2017
Resorts Casino Hotel	Resorts	February 26, 2015
Scores Casino	Borgata	July 31, 2017
SugarHouse	Golden Nugget	September 13, 2016
Tropicana Casino	Tropicana	November 21, 2013
Unibet Casino	Hard Rock	November, 2019
Virgin Casino	Tropicana	January 24, 2014
WSOP.com	Caesars	November 21, 2013

== Gallery ==
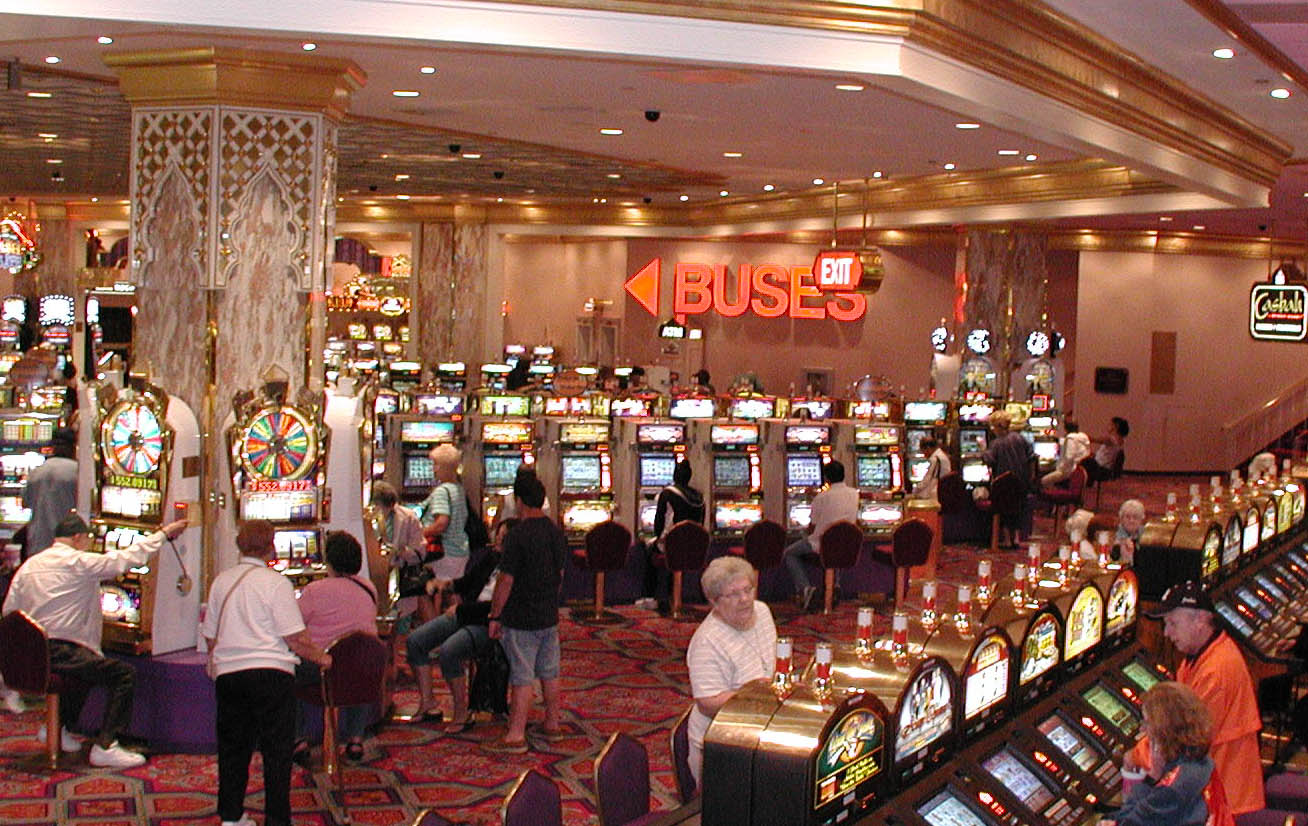

== See also ==
- List of casinos in the United States
- List of casino hotels
- Gambling in New Jersey
