= List of Atlantic City casinos that never opened =

Numerous casinos have been planned for Atlantic City, New Jersey but never opened.

In November 1976, New Jersey voters approved a referendum that legalized casino gambling in Atlantic City, and when the Casino Control Act of New Jersey was signed by the governor on June 2, 1977, Atlantic City became the first place in the U.S., outside of Nevada, with legalized casino gambling. A rush of investors announced plans to build hotel-casinos. However, a lack of available financing, along with legal issues such as zoning, licensing, and environmental regulations, ended most of these plans. Most of them stopped in the planning stage; only a few, such as the Dunes and the Penthouse, entered construction. Many of the proposed projects were announced with major publicity efforts but died quietly.

== American Land Company ==
In July 1978, American Land Company, headed by Steven Silverberg, announced plans to build a hotel-casino in the marina area, named The Marina Casino. However, later that year, he faced charges by the Securities and Exchange Commission for misleading investors in the project. He later sold an option on the land for the project to MGM Grand Hotels.

== American Motor Inns and Great American Industries ==
In June 1979, a joint venture to construct a hotel-casino in the marina area was announced by American Motor Inns, Inc. and Great American Industries.

== Atlantic Beach Resort & Casino ==
In 2006, AC Gateway LLC, headed by Wally Barr and Curtis Bashaw, purchased a number of properties near Albany Avenue and the Boardwalk in order to build a hotel-casino. These properties included the former Dunes and Sahara projects, along with the former Atlantic City High School site. A plan for a $1.5-billion mega-casino called the Atlantic Beach Resort & Casino was unveiled in 2008. The project was suspended in 2009 due to the economic downturn. The project was later revived in 2011 as the proposed Hard Rock Hotel and Casino.

== Atlantic Land Limited ==
Atlantic Land Limited opened an office near New York Avenue in 1979, proposing to build a 31-story hotel-casino. However, by the next year, the office was closed.

== Atlantis ==
In May 1977, Edward Sims announced that his investor group would develop a hotel-casino, called the Atlantis, in the marina area. (This was no relation to the Atlantis Hotel and Casino, which was renamed from the Playboy Hotel and Casino in 1984.) In 1978, a portion of the land they owned was sold to Harrahs, contingent on getting it rezoned. However, the rezoning was refused and the sale was cancelled. In 1980 the investor group announced that the property was to be sold to American Motor Inns.

== Benihana Hotel-Casino / Carnival (or Carousel) Club Hotel Casino ==
The Shelburne Hotel (Atlantic City) was leased to Japanese investors Rocky Aoki, owner of the Benihana restaurant chain, and Takashi Sasakawa, who planned to keep the existing hotel as well as add a 31-story tower and casino calling it the Benihana Hotel-Casino. In 1983 work crews began to renovate the hotel, however, disagreements between the Malmut family (owners of the hotel), the New Jersey Casino Control Commission, and outside investors led Akoi and Sasakawa to abandon the project after investing over $25 million in construction and renovations. Sasakawa was the son of noted Japanese fascist and philanthropist Ryoichi Sasakawa, who had links with the Yakuza. Aoki and Sasakawa had also faced charges by the Securities and Exchange Commission for insider trading in the stock of Hardwicke Companies, which had planned to manage the hotel/casino.

After the Benihana Hotel-Casino project stopped, the Shelburne Hotel (Atlantic City) was acquired in 1984 by Blumenfeld Development Corp. and the hotel was demolished. The company applied for a casino license on July 23, 1985. In 1986 a groundbreaking was held for the intended construction of the Carousel Club Hotel Casino. (It was originally called the Carnival Club Hotel Casino, but the name was changed after Carnival Cruise Lines sued them.) However, the company did not obtain sufficient financing and after foreclosure the property was sold to Bally's Manufacturing Corp., which built Bally's Wild Wild West Casino in 1997.

== Caesars Palace Atlantic City ==
In June 1977, Caesars World Inc. leased the site where the Traymore Hotel had once stood. (The hotel was imploded in 1972.) They planned to build Caesars Palace Atlantic City on the site. However, when the opportunity came about in June 1978 to lease the Howard Johnson's Regency Motor Hotel and use the existing facilities to more quickly build a hotel-casino complex, the Traymore site project was put on hold. The Boardwalk Regency opened in June 1979. The company applied for a license on January 8, 1980, for the Caesars Palace Atlantic City project but never built anything on the site. The land was later sold to Pinnacle Atlantic City for a proposed hotel-casino. However, that project also fell through.

== Camelot Hotel/Casino ==
See entry for Camelot Hotel/Casino.

== Captain Starn's Restaurant ==
Captain Starn's Restaurant was a popular restaurant located at Maine Avenue, Caspian Avenue and the Boardwalk, by the Absecon Inlet. The owners were approached twice by potential investors to buy the land for a hotel-casino, the first time by Meister Associates and the second time by Edward Wong. Caesars later took an option on the site and tried to swap it with the United States government for the site of the United States Coast Guard station in the marina area, but were turned down.

== Casino by the Sea / Royale Vista ==
In June 1978, Levin Computer Corporation, along with Hotel Associates, announced plans to develop a hotel-casino in the marina area named Casino by the Sea. Levin Computer had briefly owned the Bonanza Casino in Las Vegas. Levin later offered a leasehold interest in the property to Cavanaugh Communities Corp.

In 1979, Cavanaugh Communities Corporation, a Florida land sales company, planned to develop a hotel-casino in the marina area called the Royale Vista. However, the land was sold to Resorts Casino Hotel in 1983, after a Cavanaugh subsidiary filed bankruptcy.

== Chalfonte Hotel – Holiday Inns ==
Holiday Inns purchased the Chalfonte Hotel from Resorts Casino Hotel in 1979, intending to demolish the hotel and develop a new hotel-casino. However, in 1981, they announced that the development was postponed and eventually the project was cancelled.

== Colonial Commercial Corp. / King International Corp. ==
Colonial Commercial Corp. was a company that made cement and blue jeans. In 1979, King International Corp., which operated a hotel-casino in Aruba, acquired an option to purchase some land from Trans-Expo Inc. Colonial Commercial then acquired the option from King International, with which it planned to merge, and later exercised the option. Colonial filed bankruptcy in 1982 and gave the land back to Trans-Expo, which held the mortgage.

== Context Industries and Terminal Industries ==
In June 1979, Context Industries, Inc. announced that it had entered into a memorandum of understanding with Terminal Industries, Inc. to develop a hotel-casino.

== Dunes Hotel and Casino (Atlantic City) ==
See entry for Dunes Hotel and Casino (Atlantic City).

== First Artists Production Company ==
In October 1977, First Artists Production Company confirmed reports that they were negotiating for potential hotel-casino properties in Atlantic City. The company was partly owned by entertainers Paul Newman, Barbra Streisand, Steve McQueen, Sidney Poitier and Dustin Hoffman. The property mentioned was the Holiday Inn, which was sold a few months later to Penthouse for its Penthouse Boardwalk Hotel and Casino project.

== Hard Rock Hotel and Casino (Atlantic City) ==
Hard Rock International announced plans in 2010 to build a $300-million casino in partnership with Och-Ziff Real Estate on the Boardwalk at Albany Avenue, at the site previously proposed for the Atlantic Beach Resort & Casino. It was proposed under the state's recently enacted "boutique casino" law, which allowed up to two casinos to be opened with a minimum of 200 hotel rooms, instead of the usual 500 rooms. The first phase of construction would have included 208 hotel rooms and 54,800 square feet (5,090 m^{2}) of gaming space; a second phase would follow with an additional 642 rooms and 27,500 square feet (2,550 m^{2}) of gaming space. Other features would have included a beachfront Hard Rock Cafe, other upscale restaurants, bars, a rock-and-roll museum, a spa, and beach cabanas.

Construction was planned to begin by July 2012, with an opening date in 2014, but the schedule was pushed back because of delays in the permitting process. Hard Rock dropped the project in September 2012 because market conditions in Atlantic City, including poor results at the newly opened Revel casino, made it very difficult to secure financing. The company would later return to the city in 2017 with its purchase of the shuttered Trump Taj Mahal and planned renovation of the property as a Hard Rock casino.

Hard Rock Hotel & Casino Atlantic City opened June 28, 2018.

== Kissane-Leddy ==
In 1977, William Kissane and John Leddy, announced that they were seeking to lease land in the marina area to develop a hotel-casino. In 1980, they had their land surveying licenses suspended.

== Le Jardin ==
After the original Golden Nugget Hotel & Casino opened in 1980, the Mirage Resorts explored sites for another hotel-casino. In 1982, they looked at acquiring a site on Great Island from Vornado, Inc., but the site required rezoning. In the mid-1990s, the company proposed to build the Le Jardin hotel-casino in the marina area if the state of New Jersey built a road that connected to the hotel-casino. The company had also agreed to allow Circus Circus Enterprises and Boyd Gaming to build casinos on the site, but later reneged on the agreement. While the road, called the Atlantic City-Brigantine Connector, was eventually built, Le Jardin was cancelled after the company was acquired in 2000 by MGM Grand Inc., which later built the Borgata, in a joint venture with Boyd Gaming, on the site.

== Loews Corp. ==
Loews Corporation is a large conglomerate with interests in hotels, movie theaters, insurance, and cigarettes. In 1977, they conducted a feasibility study to determine whether they should re-enter the Atlantic City market and develop a hotel-casino. The company had formerly owned the Traymore Hotel and the Ambassador Hotel, but sold them before gambling was legalized in the city.

== Lucky Lady (or Lady Luck) Casino ==
Jean Savage, a Nutley NJ realtor and the president of HEJJ Inc. approached the 72 owners of properties bordered between Texas Ave., Bellevue Ave., Pacific Ave. and the Boardwalk. She offered them $100,000 each to sell their properties, contingent on all of them agreeing to sell. She reportedly represented some unnamed company that planned to build a hotel-casino. The effort failed.

== Metropole Hotel-Casino ==
Metropole Associates, Inc, of New York, in November 1978 announced plans to build a hotel-casino at the site of the Morton Hotel on Virginia Avenue.

== MGM Grand Atlantic City ==
MGM planned to enter the Atlantic City market in the late 1970s. However, a catastrophic fire, which killed 85 people, in 1980 at the MGM Grand Hotel and Casino (now Horseshoe Las Vegas) in Las Vegas, Nevada postponed those plans. The fire resulted in substantial litigation. In 1996, the company began buying parcels of land adjacent to the Showboat Atlantic City for a planned hotel-casino. The effort was delayed for several years due to a few land owners refusing to sell. After MGM acquired Mirage Resorts in 2000, the company switched its focus to developing the Borgata in the marina area and abandoned plans for the Boardwalk site. The land was then sold to North Beach Holdings, which in turn sold the land to a group that built the Revel. For plans by MGM to build a hotel-casino in the marina area in 2007 see the entry for MGM Grand Atlantic City.

== Nortek, Inc. ==
In 1978, Nortek, Inc, a textile and tombstone company, indicated it planned to invest in a casino. The following year, an investor lawsuit was filed against the company claiming it drove the stock price up by using false claims.

== Pagano / Triple Five ==
In 2008, realtor Robert Pagano and a representative from shopping mall owner Triple Five Group sought to get land they owned in the marina district rezoned for hotel-casino and retail use. The land consisted of 17 acres adjacent to The Borgata owned by Pagano, and a 13-acre site across the street owned by Marina Towers Association.

== Penn National Gaming ==
In 2008, Penn National Gaming had two proposals for new hotel-casinos. They offered to buy the recently closed Bader Field airport for $900 million. They planned to build one hotel-casino and sell up to three other parcels to other developers. Later that year, they planned to rezone a parcel of land on Route 30 at the city's gateway for development of a hotel-casino. Neither venture went through.

== Penthouse Boardwalk Hotel and Casino ==
See entry for Penthouse Boardwalk Hotel and Casino.

== Pinnacle Atlantic City ==
See entry for Pinnacle Atlantic City.

== Planet Hollywood ==
In 1996, Planet Hollywood International Inc., a theme restaurant chain, and ITT Corporation, which had recently acquired Caesars World, announced a joint venture to develop a hotel-casino. However, nothing became of it. After Planet Hollywood acquired the Aladdin Resort and Casino in Las Vegas, Nevada, they announced plans in 2005 to open a hotel-casino in Atlantic City. However, the casino was never built, and after having financial problems, the company lost ownership of the hotel-casino in Las Vegas in 2010.

== Prime Motor Inns ==
Prime Motor Inns had announced in January 1980 that it had approval from lenders for financing for a hotel-casino. However, the company was denied permits from the New Jersey Department of Environmental Protection. They later tried to do a joint venture with the Dunes Hotel and Casino (Atlantic City) project, but that fell through.

== Regency Hotel ==
In August 1977, Jerrold Polinsky, a cable television owner from Minnesota, announced an agreement to lease the Howard Johnson's Regency Motor Hotel and build a casino. His partners included former New York Jets owner Sonny Werblin, attorney Adrian Foley and local art dealer Reese Palley. Werblin and Foley were the chairman and Treasurer, respectively, of the New Jersey Sports and Exposition Authority. Palley had been appointed as Chairman of the New Jersey State Lottery Commission. Werblin and Foley soon dropped out of the partnership after the media and politicians noted the conflicts of interest. Polinsky sought additional investors, but could not meet the lease terms and the agreement was terminated in May 1978. Rocky Aoki had come in at the last minute to try to save the project, but the court rejected his claim. (Aoki would later try to develop the Benihana Hotel-Casino.) The property was subsequently leased to Caesars World in June 1978 and they developed the Boardwalk Regency . Polinsky went on to other ventures in the gambling industry, but was convicted in the mid-1990s of bribery, tax evasion, and securities fraud.

== Ritz-Carlton ==
In 1978, an investor group purchased the Ritz-Carlton Atlantic City intending to convert it to a hotel and casino. However, unfavorable publicity linking it to the Abscam investigation ended that plan. Senator Harrison A. Williams (D-N.J.) told an undercover FBI agent that he could help save the investors $30 million by allowing them to renovate the existing property, rather than building a new one. Williams' wife was a paid consultant and shareholder in Hardwicke Companies, the majority investor in the project, and Williams expected to receive a $1 million finder's fee for helping arrange financing for the project. Williams was later convicted on other charges relating to the Abscam scandal.

== Route 1 Corporation / Hotel Associates ==
Al Olshan, a developer from Little Ferry, New Jersey purchased some land in the marina district through a partnership, Hotel Associates, intending to develop a hotel-casino. In 1982, the Securities and Exchange Commission charged Olsham and his company, Route 1 Corp., with securities violations involving Hotel Associates.

== Royale Atlantic Hotel / Atlantic Plaza Hotel Casino ==
Robert Maheu, a former aide to Howard Hughes, and Grady Sanders announced plans for a hotel-casino in August 1978, called the Royale Atlantic Hotel. However, they were unable to get funding for the project and turned it over to other developers.

Howard Weingrow, Robert Lifton and Midland Resources took over the Royale Atlantic hotel-casino project in 1979, and renamed it the Atlantic Plaza Hotel Casino. They applied for a casino license on September 4, 1979. However, they were unable to get funding for the project, and Donald Trump took it over and developed the Trump Plaza Hotel and Casino.

== Sahara Boardwalk Hotel and Casino ==
See entry for Sahara Boardwalk Hotel and Casino.

== Sardi's Broadway Casino Hotel ==
In 1986, two theatrical producers, who had recently bought Sardi's restaurant in New York, announced plans to develop a hotel-casino in the marina district called Sardi's Broadway Casino Hotel. The project was a venture with the successor company that had tried to develop the Camelot Hotel/Casino. The producers lost ownership of Sardi's restaurant in a 1990 bankruptcy case.

== SS United States ==
In July 1977, a group headed by Harry Katz announced that they were trying to purchase the ocean liner SS United States and dock it at a pier in Atlantic City. The ship would have a casino and the cabins would function as a hotel.

== Steel Pier ==
In August 1977, Alvin Snyder, a Maryland real estate developer, planned to use the famous Steel Pier to house a hotel-casino called Casino at Sea. He bought the pier, contingent on getting the necessary government approvals for the construction and use. However, the approvals could not be obtained. In July 1978, the pier was purchased by the Resorts Casino Hotel for non-casino use.

== Trans-Expo Casino ==
Kupper Associates, a Piscataway, New Jersey engineering firm announced plans in February 1978 to build a hotel-casino at Arkansas Ave. near the terminus of the Atlantic City Expressway. The land was later sold to Colonial Commercial Corp., which defaulted on the mortgage and the land was reacquired by Tran-Expo.

== Trump Yacht Casino ==
In 1996, Donald Trump proposed building a 430-foot yacht, docking it next to the Trump's Castle resort in the marina district, and opening a casino on the boat. At the time, it would have been the largest yacht in the world, costing $75 million and having 35,000 square feet of casino space on three levels. The yacht was never built.

== Trump World's Fair successor ==
The Trump World's Fair (formerly the Trump Regency, which was formerly the Atlantis Hotel and Casino, which was formerly the Playboy Hotel and Casino) was torn down in 2000. Donald Trump then proposed building a 62-story hotel-casino on the site. However, after his company entered bankruptcy in 2005, the property was auctioned off to BET Investments, owned by real estate developer Bruce E. Toll. A deed restriction, preventing the property being used as a casino, was lifted in 2011 in exchange for $5.5 million, but no plans were announced for a hotel-casino.

== Two-O-Two Corp. ==
Two New Jersey developers, John Griek and Martin Cummins announced plans in April 1977 to develop a hotel-casino on a tract of land on U.S. Route 30 and the Absecon bridge. They were seeking to have the land rezoned from industrial to commercial use.

== Vornado, Inc. ==
Vornado, Inc., the owner of the Two Guys discount store chain, announced in November 1978 that they planned to open two hotel-casinos on Great Island, about a mile west of the Boardwalk. In 1982, Golden Nugget announced plans to purchase the site if it could be rezoned for a hotel-casino. However, the site was in the flight path of the Bader Field airport and failed to get the required Federal Aviation Administration approval for the structure.

== See also ==
- List of Las Vegas casinos that never opened
