= Dunes Hotel and Casino (Atlantic City, New Jersey) =

Proposed casino hotel in New Jersey, US

Coordinates: 39.3489°N 74.4529°W

- Interactive map of Dunes Hotel and Casino
- Location: Atlantic City, New Jersey; Albany Ave.
- Opened: Never opened
- Theme: Desert
- No. of rooms: 504
- Gaming space: 34,000 sq ft (3,200 m^{2})
- Casino type: Land-based

The Dunes Hotel and Casino was a proposed hotel and casino that was to be built in Atlantic City, New Jersey in the late 1970s. It was initially proposed to consist of 504 hotel rooms and a 34,500 square foot casino located at Albany Avenue on the Boardwalk. It was to be the southernmost hotel/casino on the Boardwalk, adjacent to the Golden Nugget Hotel & Casino. Due to financial and legal difficulties, the hotel was never completed and a casino license was never issued.

== History ==
Development initially consisted of the purchase of the President Motor Inn and Mayfair Apartments at the site. Construction began in 1979 with the demolition of the President Motor Inn and the project was involved in the Abscam investigation. The project was halted in 1980 due to lack of financing, at which time it consisted of a two-story skeleton structure. The project was owned by Continental Connector Corp. (which later changed its name to Dunes Hotel Casinos, Inc.), which also owned the Dunes in Las Vegas, Nevada. The company was controlled by Morris Shenker, a St. Louis attorney who had represented Jimmy Hoffa of the Teamsters union. Shenker had been investigated by the federal government because of his ties with organized crime. In the early 1980s, Shenker developed financial problems, leading to his filing for bankruptcy in 1984.

In April 1983, San Diego real estate developer Jack Bona took over the project as majority owner in a joint venture with Shenker's company. Bona was a major borrower at San Marino Savings & Loan with his partner Frank Domingues, with large losses on $194 million in loans contributing to the thrifts' failure in 1984.

In 1983, Bona purchased an option to buy an adjacent lot [site of the aborted Sahara Boardwalk Hotel and Casino project] from GNAC Corp., a subsidiary of Golden Nugget, Inc. for $18 million. He also obtained financing on the existing site in 1983 from the San Antonio Savings Association with a mortgage loan for $14.9 million. Plans for the project were expanded to encompass 664 rooms and a 60,000 square foot casino. Bona later took over full control of the casino project but experienced financial difficulties and filed Chapter 11 bankruptcy in August 1985. Just prior to the bankruptcy he had tried to sell some of the proposed rooms as condominium units.

In 1988, Bona's company was sold to the Royale Group Ltd., owned by Leonard Pelullo (a reputed mob associate involved with the Philadelphia crime family), although Bona was appointed as president of the company. Royale Group Ltd. was formerly known as Cavanagh Communities Corp., which had tried to develop a hotel-casino called Royale Vista in the marina district in the early 1980s, and had also sold land to American Leisure Corp. for their proposed Camelot Hotel/Casino. Royale Group Ltd. was placed in involuntary Chapter 11 bankruptcy in 1989. Bona was incarcerated in 1989 and spent almost two years in the Atlantic County jail on a writ of capia ad satisfaciendum for failing to disclose his assets after a monetary judgment was entered against him in regards to a lawsuit filed by GNAC over the land option deal.

In 1988 New York Developer Robert Cipriano of CDG of New Jersey made a bid to take the unsecured creditors out and restructure the property and assets. Working with unsecured creditors Architect David Jacobson, Perini Construction and various engineers, Cipriano met with San Antonio Savings and other lenders to reorganize the Dunes project, renaming it Cascade Hotel & Casino.

The Resolution Trust Corporation took over the property after the San Antonio Savings Association failed in July 1989 and the bankruptcy was dismissed. The unfinished structure on the property was taken down in 1991. The site was subsequently owned at various times by MGM Mirage, Park Place Entertainment, and Colony Capital. It was sold to AC Gateway LLC in 2006. A plan for a mega-casino was dropped due to the economic downturn, and a joint venture to develop a smaller Hard Rock Hotel and Casino was proposed in July 2011. However, the plan was dropped in September 2012 due to the struggling Atlantic City casino market. Student housing owned by Stockton University opened on the site in 2018.
