= Mirage Resorts =

American casino company, precursor to MGM Mirage

- Formerly: Golden Nugget Companies (1973–1989)
- Company type: Division
- Industry: Casino
- Founded: 1973; 53 years ago
- Founder: Steve Wynn
- Defunct: 2000; 26 years ago
- Fate: Merged with MGM Grand, Inc.
- Successor: MGM Resorts International
- Headquarters: Las Vegas, Nevada, U.S.
- Parent: Golden Nugget, Inc.

Mirage Resorts (formerly Golden Nugget Companies) was an American company that owned and operated hotel-casinos. It was acquired by MGM Grand, Inc. in 2000, forming MGM Mirage (now MGM Resorts International).

== History ==
Golden Nugget Companies Inc. was formed by Steve Wynn in 1973. The company was created after Wynn acquired majority control of the Golden Nugget in Las Vegas, Nevada.

In 1980, the company opened the Golden Nugget Atlantic City in New Jersey but in 1987, Wynn's and the company's interest in Atlantic City did not last very long due to frustration with state gaming regulators. The property was sold to Bally's Entertainment, and eventually became Bally's Grand Hotel and Casino.

In 1989, the company acquired the Nevada Club casino in Laughlin, Nevada, and re-branded it as the Golden Nugget Laughlin.

=== The Mirage and Treasure Island (1990s) ===
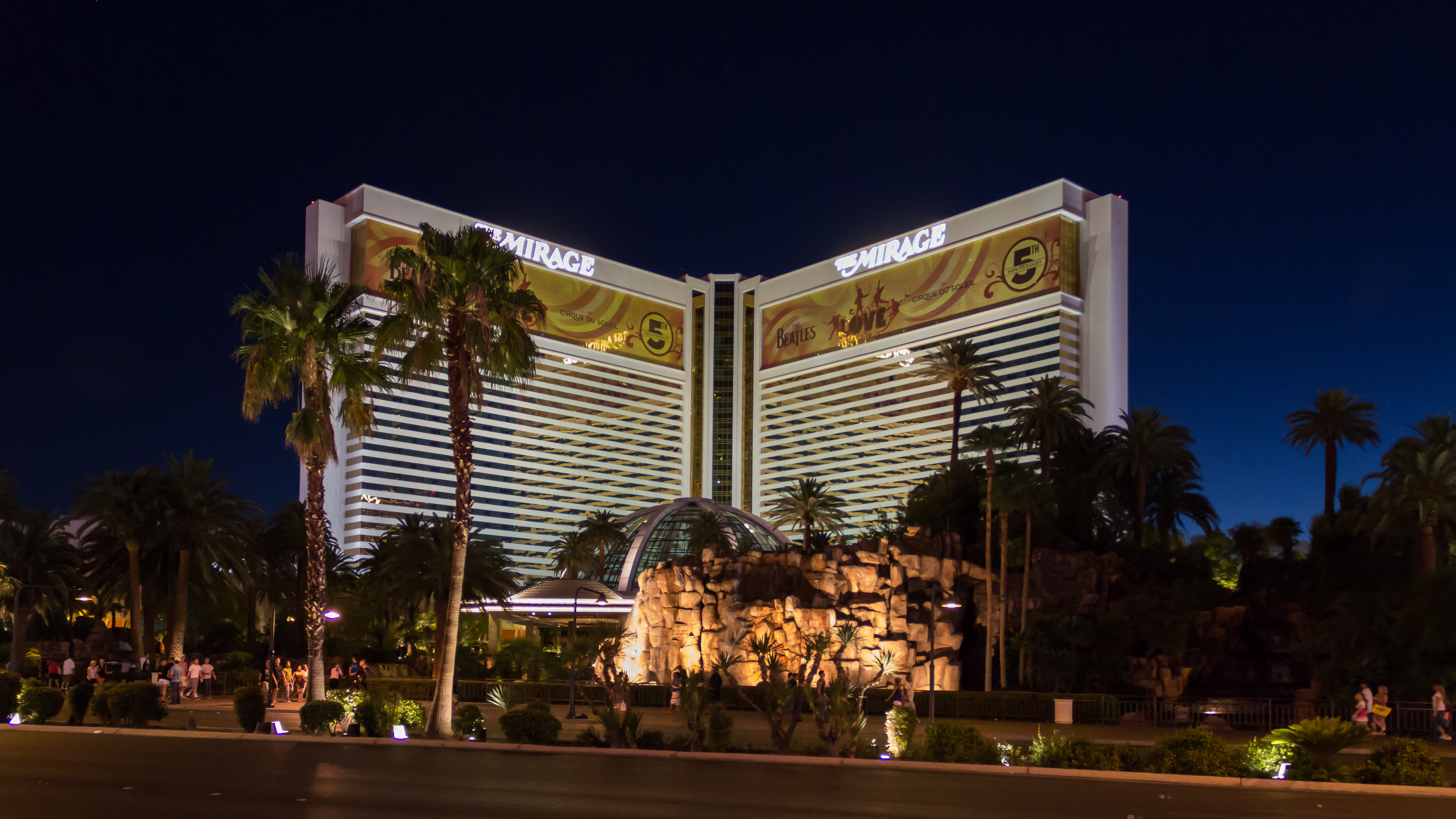
Wynn's first major Strip casino was The Mirage, which was the first time Wynn was personally involved with the design and construction of a casino.

Wynn's first major casino on the Las Vegas Strip was The Mirage, which opened in November 1989. It was the first time Wynn was involved with the design and construction of a casino, and he financed the $630 million project largely with high-yield bonds issued by Michael Milken. The resort's high cost and emphasis on luxury meant that it was considered high risk at the time, though the project ended up being enormously lucrative. The hotel, with its erupting volcano and South Seas theme, ignited a $12 billion building boom on the Strip. Its construction is also considered noteworthy in that Wynn had set a new standard for Vegas resorts, and when it opened The Mirage was the first casino to use security cameras full-time on all table games. Known for its entertainment, the hotel became the exclusive venue for the Siegfried & Roy show in 1990, and in 1993 the hotel hosted the Cirque du Soleil show Nouvelle Expérience. Afterwards Wynn decided to invite Cirque to create Mystère for the soon-to-be-built Treasure Island resort next door.

Following the completion of The Mirage in 1989 Steve Wynn changed the name of the company to Mirage Resorts, Inc. Much of the financing for the Mirage was obtained in cooperation with Michael Milken.

After the Mirage, Wynn built the Treasure Island Hotel and Casino, which he opened in the Mirage's old parking lot in 1993, and overall cost $450 million. Intended to be family-friendly, the resort featured pools in front of the casino enacted the Battle of Buccaneer Bay with two full-scaled ships, the pirate ship 'Hispaniola' and the British Royal Navy frigate 'HMS Britannia,' while the inside featured romantic tropical theming and 18th century Caribbean pirate theming. The establishment was the home of the first permanent Cirque du Soleil show in Las Vegas, and the show went on to be voted nine times as the best production show in the city by the Las Vegas Review-Journal reader's poll.

In 1994, Gold Strike Resorts announced a partnership with Mirage Resorts to build a $250-million casino targeted at budget-conscious visitors, on part of the site of the demolished Dunes on the Las Vegas Strip. It ultimately opened in 1996, following Gold Strike's merger with Circus Circus Enterprises as Monte Carlo Resort and Casino and was built as a joint venture between Mirage Resorts and Circus Circus Enterprises, and cost US$344 million to build. The resort sits on 44 acres (18 ha), occupied by the Dunes Hotel golf course until its demolition in October 1993.

In 1995, the company proposed to build the Le Jardin hotel-casino in the marina area if the state of New Jersey built a road that connected to the hotel-casino. The company had also agreed to allow Circus Circus Enterprises and Boyd Gaming to build casinos on the site, but later reneged on the agreement. While the road, called the Atlantic City-Brigantine Connector, was eventually built, Le Jardin was cancelled after the company was acquired in 2000 by MGM Grand Inc., which later built the Borgata, in a joint venture with Boyd Gaming, on the site.

Boardwalk Hotel and Casino was later acquired by Mirage Resorts in 1997.

=== Bellagio and Beau Rivage debuts (1998–1999) ===
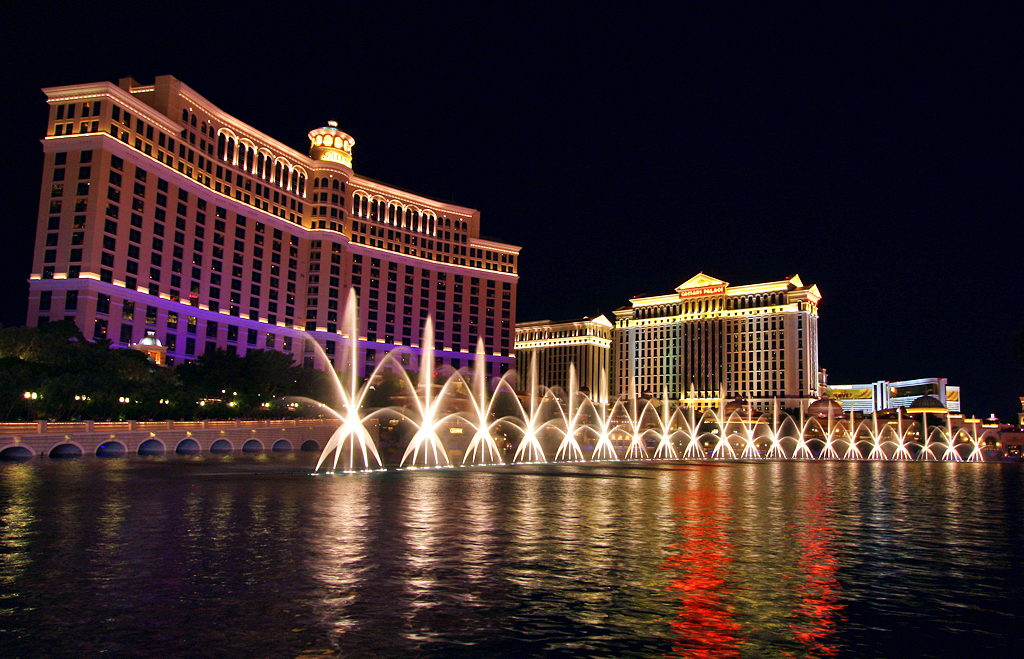
Wynn's company Mirage Resorts oversaw the construction of the Bellagio, which at the time was the most expensive hotel in the world. Like Wynn's previous resorts, the Bellagio features an extensive water show on the Strip.

In October 1998, Wynn opened the even more opulent Bellagio, a $1.6 billion resort considered among the world's most spectacular hotels. The architect was Jon Jerde of The Jerde Partnerships, and construction was handled by Mirage Resorts, Inc. When built, the Bellagio was the most expensive hotel in the world. In front of the hotel are the Fountains of Bellagio—shooting fountains choreographed to music that “dance” on the hotel's 8.5 acre man-made lake—which are now considered Las Vegas landmarks. The Bellagio is credited with starting a new spree of luxurious developments in Las Vegas. Among these developments include The Venetian, Mandalay Bay, and Paris Las Vegas.

Wynn brought Mirage Resorts’ style to Biloxi, Mississippi in 1999, where he oversaw development of the 1,835-room Beau Rivage. Themed to blend Mediterranean beauty with Southern hospitality, the resort was part of a building boom that established Biloxi as a regional tourism center along the Mississippi Gulf Coast. Beau Rivage was originally the name Wynn wanted to give the Bellagio, though he had decided on Bellagio after vacationing in the Italian region of the same name. Beau Rivage opened as the largest hotel-casino to be built outside Nevada. The casino was initially located on a series of floating barges as required by local law confining all casinos to mobile marine vessels at the time of the resort's construction. The hotel, restaurants, and associated facilities were constructed on land.

The company was acquired in 2000 by MGM Grand Inc., which then changed its name to MGM Mirage, for $6.4 billion, including $2 billion in assumed debt, after an initial all-cash offer of $17 per share and a final offer of $21 per share. The company was majority owned by Wynn.

== Hotel and casinos owned at acquisition ==
- Bellagio
- Beau Rivage
- Boardwalk Hotel and Casino
- Golden Nugget Las Vegas
- Golden Nugget Laughlin
- Announced Le Jardin in Atlantic City. This turned into a 50% interest in what is now Borgata.
- Monte Carlo (50% joint venture with Circus Circus Enterprises)
- The Mirage
- Treasure Island Hotel and Casino

=== Previous properties ===
- Golden Nugget Atlantic City
- Dunes
