= Shelburne Hotel =

Shelburne Hotel may refer to:

- Shelburne Hotel (Atlantic City, New Jersey), listed on the NRHP in New Jersey
- Shelburne Hotel (Seaview, Washington), listed on the NRHP in Washington

== See also ==
- Shelbourne Hotel in Dublin, Ireland
