= Sahara Boardwalk Hotel and Casino =

Proposed casino hotel in New Jersey, US

Coordinates: 39.349°N 74.453°W

- Interactive map of Sahara Boardwalk Hotel and Casino
- Location: Atlantic City, New Jersey; Albany Ave.
- Opened: Never developed
- Theme: Moroccan
- No. of rooms: 506
- Gaming space: 43,400 sq ft (4,030 m^{2})
- Casino type: Land-based

The Sahara Boardwalk Hotel and Casino was a proposed hotel and casino that was to be built in the late 1970s and early 1980s in Atlantic City, New Jersey. The site of the proposed project was located at Albany Avenue and the Boardwalk, between the original Golden Nugget Hotel and Casino and the proposed Dunes Hotel and Casino (Atlantic City) project. However, because of financial and legal difficulties, construction of the hotel/casino was never completed and the site was sold in 1982.

== History ==
The site was acquired in September 1978. Initial plans were to construct a 30 story building with 506 rooms and a 43,400 square foot casino. On the site was the 13-story President Towers Apartment Hotel. The property had opened as the President Hotel in 1926. In 1968 it was converted to an apartment building, with 212 units. By some accounts, it was the site of the Atlantic City Conference in 1929, where the leaders of organized crime met to discuss their future plans and operations. The building was demolished in August 1979. However, no further construction was done on the site.

The project was owned by the Del E. Webb Corporation, a real estate development company and the owner of several other casinos in Nevada, including the Sahara Hotel and Casino in Las Vegas, Nevada. They also bought an interest in the Claridge Hotel and Casino in Atlantic City in 1979. The company experienced difficulties obtaining a gaming license from the New Jersey Casino Control Commission. The New Jersey Division of Gaming Enforcement had opposed granting a temporary license for operating the Claridge Casino. The company was awaiting trial in connection with the assisting of illegal kickbacks during construction of an addition on the Aladdin Hotel & Casino in Las Vegas. The company had also been accused of providing prostitutes for high-rollers at its casinos, receiving illegal rebates on beer purchases, making illegal political contributions, and lacking sufficient credit and financial controls. After the company was acquitted in the kickback trial, and management was shuffled around, they were granted a casino license for the Claridge in 1982.

Del Webb was experiencing financial problems in the early 1980s and abandoned the Sahara project. The land was sold to the original Golden Nugget Hotel and Casino in 1982. In 1983, the adjacent Dunes Hotel and Casino (Atlantic City) project purchased an option to buy the land to expand the intended construction of their hotel/casino. However, it got entangled in bankruptcy and litigation and reverted to the Golden Nugget. The property was subsequently owned by a number of companies, most recently by AC Gateway LLC, which had proposed to develop the Hard Rock Hotel and Casino (Atlantic City) in 2011. However, that plan was abandoned and as of 2014 the site remained vacant and was being used as a parking lot.
