= Harrah's Atlantic City =

Hotel and casino in Atlantic City, New Jersey

Harrah's Resort Atlantic City

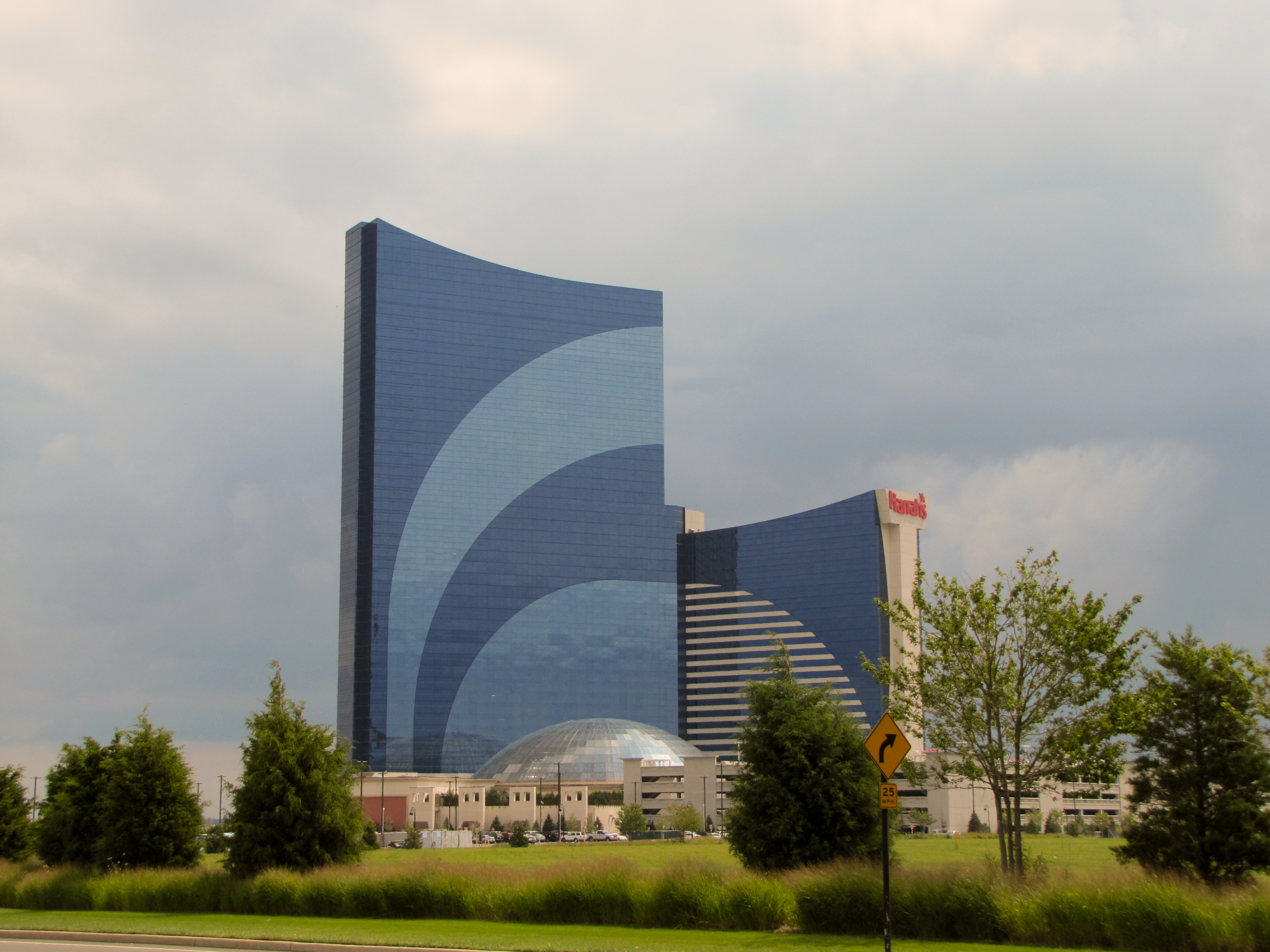
- View of Harrah's Resort from Borgata.
- Interactive map of Harrah's Resort Atlantic City
- Location: Atlantic City, New Jersey; 777 Harrah's Boulevard Atlantic City, New Jersey; 39.38453°N 74.42911°W
- Opened: November 22, 1980; 45 years ago
- Theme: Marina; Waterfront
- No. of rooms: 2,587
- Gaming space: 160,000 sq ft (15,000 m^{2})
- Permanent shows: DJ Smooth – Saturdays After Dark
- Signature attractions: The Pool at Harrah's; The Waterfront Shops
- Notable restaurants: McCormick & Schmick's; Gordon Ramsay Steak
- Casino type: Land-based
- Owner: Vici Properties
- Operating license holder: Caesars Entertainment
- Architect: Various, SOSH Architects & MPM Studios (Renovations)
- Previous names: Harrah's Marina Resort
- Renovated in: Waterfront Tower (2022); Atrium Tower (2021); Laguna Tower (2020); Coastal Tower (2019); Bayview Tower (2017); Unnamed Plans (2021–2023)
- Website: caesars.com/harrahs-ac

Harrah's Resort Atlantic City is a casino hotel in the marina district of Atlantic City, New Jersey, owned by Vici Properties and operated by Caesars Entertainment. Harrah's is one of the largest hotels in New Jersey.

The casino is one of three in the marina district (away from the Boardwalk and ocean beach) of the city, along with the Borgata and the Golden Nugget. Harrah's was the first to be located in the district and remained the only resort there until Trump's Castle (later Trump Marina, now the Golden Nugget) was opened in 1985. It was the fifth casino to open in Atlantic City after the legalization of gambling.

== History ==
Harrah's Atlantic City was conceived, and initial construction started, by a partnership of LM Walters Co and Holiday Inns. It was originally to be named the "Holiday Inn Marina Casino". Holiday Inns purchased Harrah's Corporation, following the death of Harrah's founder Bill Harrah, during construction of the facility. Though Bill Harrah did not participate in the new casino's development, the facility was re-branded Harrah's Marina Hotel Casino prior to opening. The new casino was located in the marina district – the first casino in Atlantic City not located on the famous boardwalk. Harrah's Waterfront Tower rises 46 stories above the Marina in Atlantic City.

Harrah's opened on Saturday November 22, 1980 with a 506-room hotel tower, now known as the Coastal Tower, and became the top-grossing casino in the city. In 1986, Harrah's opened the new all-suite Atrium Tower, due to the complex's popularity and the opening of Trump's Castle across the road. Another expansion occurred in 1997 with the opening of the Marina Tower. The Harbour, Atrium, and Marina towers each stand at 16 stories tall, and the Atrium Tower is connected to the Coastal and Marina towers by hallways on each floor. In 2002, the 25-story Bayview Tower opened, along with expanded gaming space.

The Waterfront Tower opened in 2008, along with a new pool and a spa, to better compete with the nearby Borgata, which opened in 2003. The hotel tower is Atlantic City's second tallest building, at 525 feet. At night, the entire surface of the tower displays varying digital images. On a square footage basis, this installation is believed to be the largest exterior LED display surface in the world.

In November 2016, Harrah's began renovating the 450 Bayview rooms/suites. The rooms will look like the ones in the Valley Tower at Harrah's in Las Vegas. Floors 4, 5, & 6 were done before Christmas 2016 and opened on December 23, 2016. The full renovations were completed in 2017. In late 2018, Harrah's announced its 507 room/suite Harbour Tower would be renamed the Coastal Tower and completely renovated to look similar to the recently renovated Bayview Tower rooms. The first set of rooms will open on Thursday February 7, 2019, and the rest of the rooms should be completed by summer 2019.

In July 2020, Eldorado Resorts acquired Caesars Entertainment, taking over operations of the property. In connection with that acquisition, Vici Properties bought the real estate of Harrah's Atlantic City for $599 million and leased it back to Eldorado (newly renamed as Caesars Entertainment).

== Restaurants and shops ==
Harrah's features a variety of restaurants, both for fine and casual dining (including a restaurant by Gordon Ramsay), and a small collection of stores.

== Entertainment ==
The 800-seat Broadway by the Bay Theater opened on December 31, 1980, with singing team Sandler and Young. The room featured many of the staples of Harrah's properties in Reno and Lake Tahoe including Sammy Davis Jr., Andy Williams, The Oak Ridge Boys, Marilyn McCoo, Shecky Greene and Suzanne Somers. Many professional boxing events have also been held in the theater. In 2007, the room was remodeled to feature theater-style seating and 400 seats were added. The 1200-seat theater was renamed The Concert Venue. Recent headliners have included Ron White, Penn & Teller and Patti LaBelle.

== Events ==
=== Sports ===
Boxing matches are held at the casino.

== Elizabeth Arden Red Door Spa ==
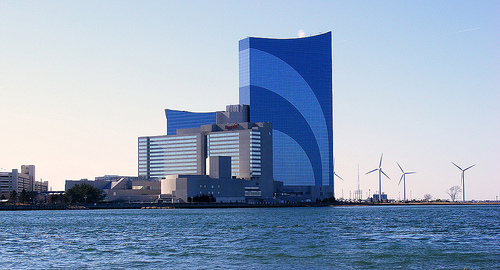
Harrah's from across the inlet in Brigantine

The Elizabeth Arden Red Door Spa is a state-of-the-art spa located next to the domed pool in the new expansion of the resort. It consists of 23 treatment rooms, Jacuzzi and sauna rooms, and a cafe. Closed in 2017. A new spa opened in 2018.

== Gaming ==
Harrah's has 177,000 sq ft (16,400 m^{2}) of gaming space, with 5,567 slot and video poker machines and 139 table games. The poker room has 40 tables, and hosts an annual World Series of Poker event. Harrah's also has a sportsbook which offers sports betting that opened on August 1, 2018.

Poker Room – Harrah's Atlantic City features 40 poker tables open 24 hours a day, 7 days a week. The room offers mainly low limit cards games. Most big limit poker players tend to play at The Borgata. They host a number of tournaments every year, including a WSOP circuit event and some World Poker Tour tournaments as well.

== The Pool at Harrah's ==
The new pool at Harrah's is located under a large glass dome and is surrounded by palm trees and other plants. Due to the landscaping and warm temperature year-round, the pool has become a very popular destination in the city. It has a minimum age of 21, and guests under 21 can use the family pool on the opposite side of the resort. On Wednesday, Friday and Saturday nights, the pool is transformed into "The Pool After Dark," offering live DJ music with artists such as 50 Cent, PSY, Jesse McCartney, and VIP Bottle Service.

The pool closed for major renovations on January 17, 2017, and reopened on March 3, 2017.

== Transportation ==
Harrah's has a bus service, the Caesars Rewards Shuttle, which takes hotel guests and Caesars Rewards members to Caesars Atlantic City and Tropicana, the other Caesars Entertainment properties in Atlantic City. it operates 11am-8pm Friday-Sunday. it goes from Harrah's to Caesar's then to Tropicana in that order.

Harrah's Atlantic City is also accessible via the Brigantine Connector and is serviced by Route 2 and 3 of the Atlantic City Jitney Association.

The Casino is also accessible by rail via the free jitney buses to and from the Atlantic City Rail Terminal (NJ Transit Atlantic City Line). It is also accessible by NJ Transit Bus #501.

The casino offers air charter service via Republic Airlines to Atlantic City International Airport from many cities across the East coast with hotel packages.

== See also ==
- List of casinos in New Jersey
- Gambling in New Jersey
- List of tallest buildings in Atlantic City
- List of integrated resorts

Preceded by Chairman Tower	Tallest Building in Atlantic City; 2008–2010; 525 ft	Succeeded by Ocean Resort Casino
