= Diamond Jim Brady =

American businessman

James B. Brady
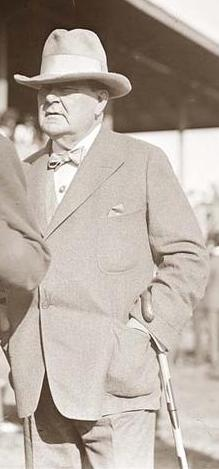
- Diamond Jim Brady c. 1900
- Born: James Buchanan Brady; August 12, 1856; New York City, NY, United States
- Died: April 13, 1917 (aged 60); Atlantic City, New Jersey, United States
- Body discovered: Shelburne Hotel
- Resting place: Holy Cross Cemetery; 40°38′49″N 73°56′17″W
- Other names: "Diamond Jim"; "Diamond Jim Brady"
- Occupations: American businessman; Financier; Philanthropist; Railroad business magnate
- Years active: 39
- Known for: Penchant for diamonds, precious stones, and jewelry; Voracious appetite
- Parents: John Brady; Mary A. Lucas

James Buchanan Brady (August 12, 1856 – April 13, 1917), also known as Diamond Jim Brady, was an American businessman, financier and philanthropist of the Gilded Age.

== Early life and family ==
Brady was born in New York City to an Irish immigrant family. He was born “into humble circumstances on the far lower West Side of Manhattan, the son of a saloon owner.”

== Career ==
Brady worked his way up from bellhop and courier. After gaining employment in the New York Central Railroad system, he became the chief assistant to the general manager by the age of 21. At 23, Brady parlayed his knowledge of the rail transport industry and its officials to become a highly successful salesman for Manning, Maxwell and Moore, a railroad supply company. In 1899 he became sales agent for the Pressed Steel Car Company.

== Lifestyle ==
Known for his penchant for jewels, especially diamonds, he collected precious stones and jewelry in excess of US$2 million (equivalent to approximately $77,400,000 in 2025 dollars).

Brady's enormous appetite was as legendary as his wealth, though modern experts believe it was greatly exaggerated. It was not unusual, according to the legend, for Brady to eat enough food for ten people at a sitting. George Rector, owner of a favorite restaurant, described Brady as "the best 25 customers I ever had". For breakfast, he would eat "vast quantities of hominy, eggs, cornbread, muffins, flapjacks, chops, fried potatoes, beefsteak, washing it all down with a gallon of fresh orange juice". A mid-morning snack would consist of "two or three dozen clams or Lynnhaven oysters". Luncheon would consist of "shellfish...two or three deviled crabs, a brace of boiled lobsters, a joint of beef, and an enormous salad". He would also include a dessert of "several pieces of homemade pie" and more orange juice. Brady would take afternoon tea, which consisted of "another platter of seafood, accompanied by two or three bottles of lemon soda". Dinner was the main meal of the day, taken at Rector's Restaurant. It usually comprised "two or three dozens oysters, six crabs, and two bowls of green turtle soup. Then in sumptuous procession came six or seven lobsters, two canvasback ducks, a double portion of terrapin, sirloin steak, vegetables, and for dessert a platter of French pastries."

A gregarious man, Brady was a mainstay of Broadway nightlife. He often dined with popular society. After further investments in the stock market, Brady accumulated wealth estimated at $12 million, though not always by ethical means. According to biographer Harry Paul Jeffers, "On election night (1896), Brady won about $180,000 (equivalent to approximately $6,966,000 in 2025 dollars) by making crooked bets on the William McKinley–William Jennings Bryan presidential election." He also enriched himself to the tune of $1.25 million (equivalent to approximately $48,375,000 in 2025 dollars) through a shady stock deal involving the Reading Railroad.

He was known for being the first person in New York City to own an automobile (in 1895).

== Thoroughbred racing ==
Jim Brady owned and raced a significant stable of Thoroughbred horses which were trained by Matthew Allen. Among his top horses, Gold Heels was the Champion Older Male Horse of 1902 and Accountant was the American Co-Champion Three-Year-Old Male Horse of 1906. In his obituary, the Daily Racing Form noted that his activities in racing helped make him a national figure.

== Personal life ==
"Diamond Jim" is known for his longtime relationship with actress and singer Lillian Russell. It is said they would rendezvous at his home at 7 West 46th Street in Manhattan. It is said that her eating habits were a perfect match for his own.

In 1912, Brady donated $220,000 to Johns Hopkins Hospital in Baltimore, Maryland, where he had once been treated. The hospital created the James Buchanan Brady Urological Institute in his honor.

Brady never married, and after his death, his estate was distributed to many institutions, most notably New York Hospital - now NewYork–Presbyterian Hospital - where the Department of Urology still maintains the James Buchanan Brady Foundation.

== Death ==
Brady died in his sleep on 13 April 1917, of a heart attack. Although he died of a myocardial infarction, he also suffered from Bright's disease, coronary heart disease, diabetes mellitus, gallstones, arterial hypertension, inflamed prostate, as well as persistent, recurrent urinary tract infections. When his body was examined, doctors discovered that his stomach was six times the size of that of an average person.

== Legacy ==
- Brady was the inspiration for a 1935 film written by Preston Sturges entitled Diamond Jim.
- In the 1940 film, Lillian Russell, Diamond Jim Brady is portrayed by Edward Arnold.
- Brady is mentioned in two episodes of I Love Lucy: "The Business Manager" (season 4, episode 1) – (Ricky to Fred: "Mr. Hickox? He makes you look like Diamond Jim Brady!") and "Lucy Gets a Paris Gown" (season 5, episode 20) – (Ethel calls Fred "Diamond Jim Mertz" after he warns her not to buy a dress).
- In 1968 film The Odd Couple, Oscar calls Felix "Diamond Jim Brady" when he orders tea for him at a late night diner while they are discussing his separation.
- In the October 26, 1966 The Beverly Hillbillies episode "Come Back Little Herbie", Granny describes the dapperly dressed, playboy gorilla named Herbie as "a hairy Diamond Jim Brady".
- Brady was the protagonist of the fictional film Bonjour, Diamond Jim that was featured in the film Tim and Eric's Billion Dollar Movie (2012).
- A story about Brady is told in Kurt Vonnegut's novel Jailbird in which Brady, on a bet while dining at the Hotel Arapahoe, eats four dozen oysters, four lobsters, four chickens, four squabs, four T-bone steaks, four pork chops, and four lamb chops.
- The Season 5 episode "Lillian Russell" / "The Lagoon" of Fantasy Island involves a woman becoming Lillian Russell and being caught between the affections of Brady and another man.
- The actor Howard Keel was cast as Brady in a 1963 episode of the TV series Death Valley Days, hosted by Stanley Andrews. In the story, while traveling by train in Texas, Brady accepts a nearly impossible wager that he can sell $100,000 worth of barbed wire to area ranchers who oppose such fencing – and can do so without leaving the train.
- Brady is featured in Caleb Carr's The Angel of Darkness near the end of a chapter; as the main characters arrive in Saratoga Springs, New York, the narrator Stevie sees Brady dining with his paramour Lillian Russell, and notes that while neither Brady's manners nor language is all that pleasant, neither are Miss Russell's.
- In the 1964 movie What a Way to Go!, the character Louisa May Foster (Shirley MacLaine) said to herself on a flight on Rod Anderson Jr.'s (Robert Mitchum) jet that "he wasn't the Diamond Jim Brady of the Jet set. He was cold, arrogant, sure of himself. Another object lesson on what money and power can do to a human being."
- The Famous Beverly Hills Restaurant, Lawry's The Prime Rib has a special cut of Prime Rib called the "Diamond Jim Brady Cut", an extra-thick portion, rib bone in.
