= Kings Castle Hotel and Casino =

Kings Castle Hotel and Casino was a hotel and casino owned and operated by Nathan "Nate" Jacobson on the north shore of Lake Tahoe in Incline Village, Nevada. It opened in 1970 and closed after Jacobson filed for bankruptcy in 1972.

== History ==
Nathan Jacobson was a Baltimore insurance executive who became the president and part owner of Caesars Palace in Las Vegas, Nevada during the 1960s. He had come under federal investigation because he had hired Jerome Zarowitz, who had organized crime connections, as director of casino operations. Jacobson faced charges from the Securities and Exchange Commission relating to the sale of Caesars Palace in 1969.

In 1969, Jacobson purchased the property of the former Incline Village Casino and Lake Tahoe Hotel. He invested $20 million into the property and renovated it into a Camelot-themed hotel and casino. It reopened as the 470-room Kings Castle Hotel and Casino in July 1970. The casino floor included five craps tables, a roulette wheel, 15 blackjack tables, a 35-seat Keno lounge, slot machines and a baccarat table. Hotel room rates ran from $24 to $32, or $45 to $110 for a suite. The Chicago Tribune wrote: "The new Kings Castle has to be seen to be believed, and even then you'll have problems. It's an 11-story neo-Tudor structure crowned by a battlemented parapet from which medieval pennants wave in the mountain breezes....[Jacobson] predicted that it would become a hotel and entertainment complex to rival Las Vegas, a forecast that very well might please the boomsters but will drive conservationists even closer to suicide."

Kings Castle was the first major hotel/casino operation on the north shore devoted to top name entertainment. The hotel opened with Buddy Hackett in the main 800-seat Camelot Room, and Bobby Stevens and the new Checkmates with the revue "Flash" in the 300-seat Jesters Court lounge. Booked performers for the rest of 1970 included Line Renaud, Ike & Tina Turner, Sam & Dave, B.B. King, Don Adams, Don Rickles, Tony Bennett, Shecky Greene, and Pearl Bailey.

In 1971, the casino did more than $5‐million in gambling volume, but the hotel had suffered "considerable financial losses" since it was opened. In November 1971, Jacobson and his other minority stockholders agreed to sell the hotel casino to August T. Marra and Dr. Joseph Barkett.
