= Camelot Hotel/Casino =

Proposed casino hotel in New Jersey, US

Coordinates: 39.383°N 74.428°W

The Camelot Hotel/Casino was a proposed hotel and casino that was to be built in the early 1980s in Atlantic City, New Jersey. The site of the proposed project was located in the marina district, adjacent to Harrahs Resort, and was to consist of 990 hotel rooms and a 60,000 sq ft casino. Entertainer Merv Griffin was appointed as entertainment director of the company and planned to broadcast his television show from the hotel. However, because of financial, political and legal difficulties, the construction of the hotel/casino was never completed and a casino license was never issued.

== History ==
The project was initially owned by American Leisure Corp., headed by Nathan S. Jacobson. Jacobson was an insurance executive who became the president and part owner of Caesars Palace in Las Vegas, Nevada, during the 1960s. He had come under scrutiny by the government because he had appointed Jerome Zarowitz, who had organized crime connections, as director of the casino operations. Jacobson faced charges from the Securities and Exchange Commission relating to the sale of Caesars Palace in 1969. Jacobson also developed and operated the Kings Castle Hotel and Casino in the Lake Tahoe, Nevada, area in the early 1970s, until it filed for bankruptcy in 1972.

Cavanagh Communities Corp., a Florida land sales company, sold an 8.2 acre parcel of land in Atlantic City's marina district in April 1980 to American Leisure Corp. in exchange for stock and cash. [Cavanagh had also planned to open a casino, called Royale Vista, on another adjacent nine acre parcel of land. However, that parcel was sold to Resorts Casino Hotel in 1983, after a Cavanagh subsidiary filed bankruptcy.] Penny stock broker Blinder, Robinson & Company underwrote a stock offering of $25 million for American Leisure at the beginning of 1980 to provide funding for the project. However, in August 1980, the Securities and Exchange Commission brought charges against a number of parties, including Blinder, Cavanagh, American Leisure and Jacobson because the broker withheld information during the offering.

In 1983, Southern Sun Hotel Holdings Ltd., based in South Africa and headed by Sol Kerzner, was slated to take over as majority partner on the project. However, they faced significant community and political pressure because of the apartheid government in South Africa. As a result, Southern Sun dropped their plans to invest in the project later that year. The company was the owner of the Sun City resort in the supposedly independent country of Bophuthatswana. Sun City later gained notoriety when a prominent group of musicians, called Artists United Against Apartheid, released a record called "Sun City" and vowed never to play there. Kerzner later returned to Atlantic City, after the end of the apartheid South African government, when he bought the Resorts Casino Hotel in 1997, ironically from Merv Griffin's Griffin Gaming & Entertainment.

American Leisure merged with Midland Resources in 1984 to create American Midland Corp. [Midland Resources had planned to develop a casino on the Boardwalk adjacent to the Convention Center. The project, under the name of Royale Atlantic, was initially planned in 1979 by Robert Maheu (a former aide to Howard Hughes) and Grady Sanders. Unable to raise sufficient funding, Midland took over the project and renamed the Atlantic Plaza Hotel Casino but could not find financing. Finally, the land was leased to Donald Trump, who developed it into Trump Plaza.] In 1986, two theatrical producers, who had recently bought Sardi's restaurant in New York City, joined up with American Midland in a plan to develop the Sardi's Broadway Casino Hotel on the site. However, the plan fell through (Sardi's restaurant filed for bankruptcy in 1990 and ownership of the restaurant was returned to the Sardi family.). Currently, the site remains vacant.
