= Pinnacle Atlantic City =

American holding company

Coordinates: 39.357396°N 74.430956°W

- Interactive map of Pinnacle Atlantic City
- Location: S Indiana Avenue and Brighton Park Atlantic City, New Jersey 08401
- Casino type: Land
- Owner: Pinnacle Entertainment
- Previous names: Brighton Hotel & Casino; Sands Atlantic City

Pinnacle Atlantic City was a planned casino resort in Atlantic City, New Jersey, which was to be constructed by Pinnacle Entertainment on the former site of the Sands Atlantic City. The property was purchased from investor Carl Icahn. After the property was bought, Pinnacle gave 60 days' notice to employees of the casino. After the closure of the Sands, Pinnacle sold the hotel supplies at a liquidation sale and destroyed more than $61 million of table chips.

When Pinnacle removed the Sands' slot machines to other Pinnacle properties, a total of $17,193.34 was found, some of which went to taxes and to fund the dismantling of the people mover that ran from the Boardwalk to Sands Atlantic City, along Brighton Park.

The Pinnacle Atlantic City was slated to open in late 2011 or early 2012. However, on March 6, 2009, Pinnacle's Chairman and chief executive officer Dan Lee announced that the project was suspended indefinitely and the company may seek to sell the property. On July 30, 2010, in an article in The Press of Atlantic City, Pinnacle said that it would be selling its Atlantic City assets and abandoning its casino projects there.

Pinnacle Entertainment has also considered building an additional casino on the Bader Field site, but no official announcements have been made.

On March 1, 2013, Pinnacle disclosed in a filing with the SEC that it had entered a definitive agreement to sell its Atlantic City holdings to an undisclosed buyer for $30.6 million. The deal was expected to close by the end of March.

== Present use ==
The site is now the home of a temporary public art park.

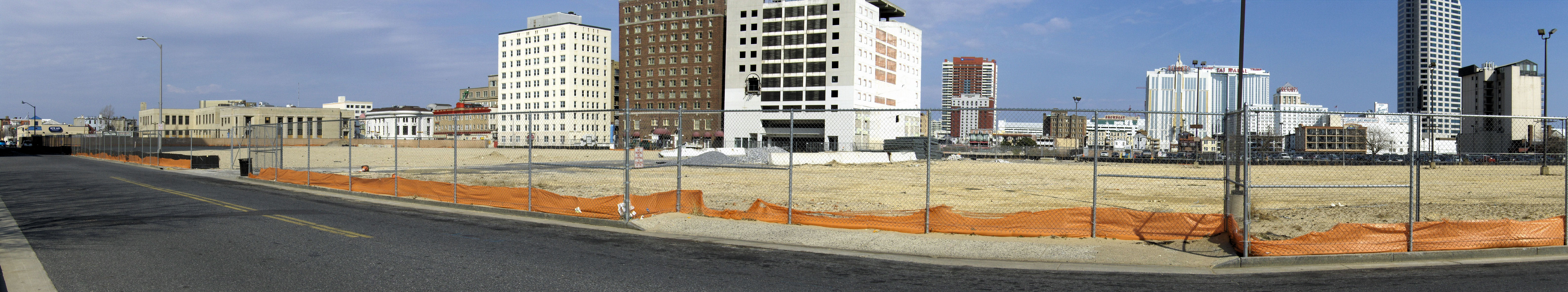
Panoramic view of the site of the former Sands Atlantic City, presently owned by Pinnacle Atlantic City.
