= Shelburne Hotel (Atlantic City, New Jersey) =

Demolished hotel in New Jersey, US

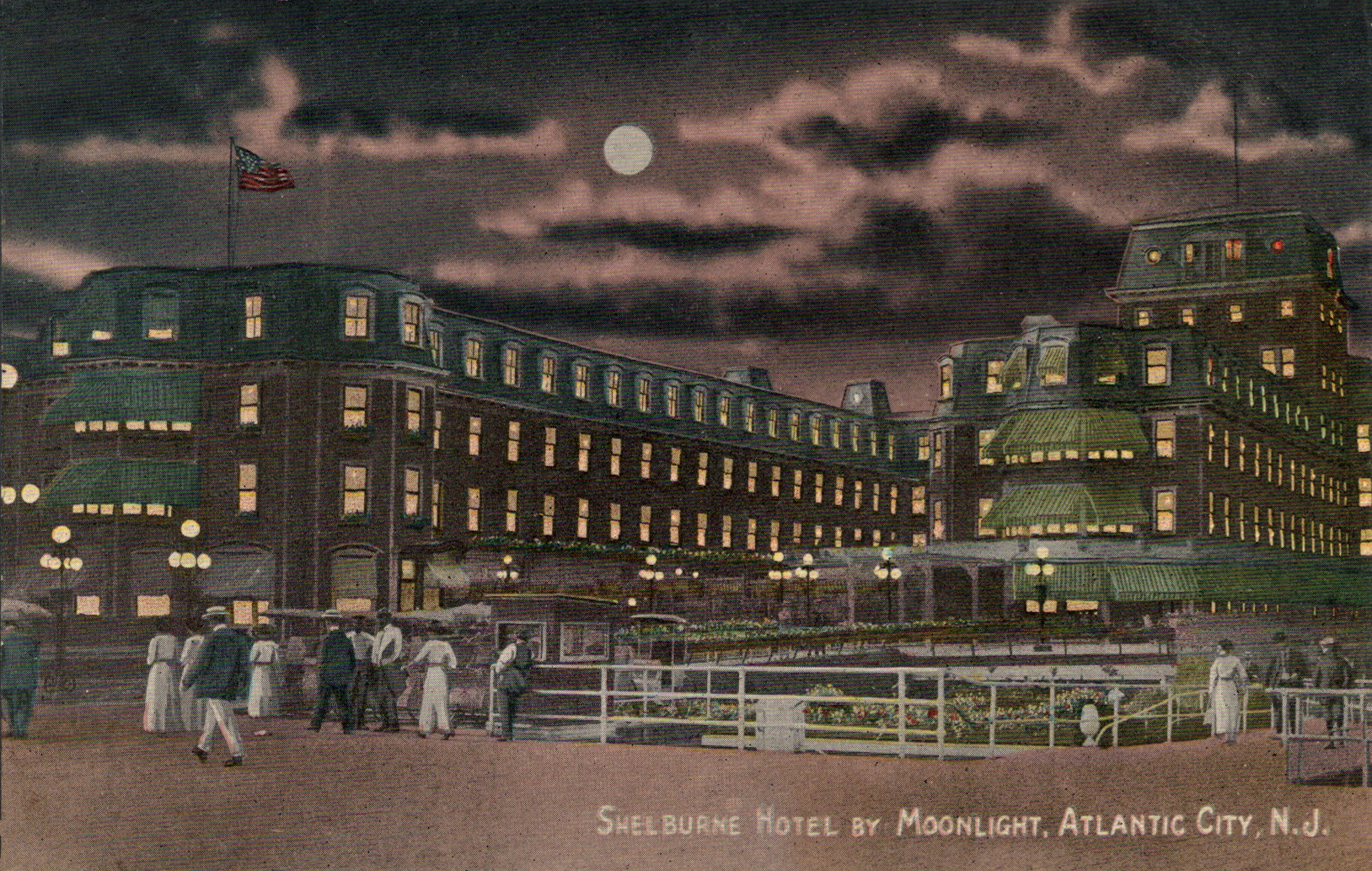
- Shelburne Hotel, Atlantic City, circa 1913
- Interactive map of the Shelburne Hotel area
- Alternative names: The Skyscraper By The Sea

General information
- Location: Michigan Avenue and the Boardwalk, Atlantic City, New Jersey, Park Place & The Boardwalk
- Coordinates: 39°21′21″N 74°26′3″W
- Completed: 1922
- Opening: December 1922
- Renovated: 1977
- Owner: TJM Properties

Technical details
- Floor count: 24

Design and construction
- Architect: Warren and Wetmore

Other information
- Number of rooms: 400
- Number of suites: 400
- Parking: 500

- Shelburne Hotel
- U.S. National Register of Historic Places
- New Jersey Register of Historic Places
- Location within Atlantic County, New Jersey
- Built: 1922
- Architectural style: Colonial Revival, Georgian Revival
- NRHP reference No.: 78001733
- NJRHP No.
- Added to NRHP: May 19, 1978

The Shelburne Hotel was a resort in Atlantic City, New Jersey, United States, located at Michigan Avenue and the Boardwalk. Built and opened in 1869, the hotel was originally a wood-frame cottage. Following several expansions, under the direction of hotel manager Jacob Weikel, a modern, brick-faced, steel frame, multistory structure was constructed along Michigan Avenue at the corner with the Boardwalk. This portion of the hotel opened in 1926. The hotel was an example of Georgian Revival architecture and was listed on the National Register of Historic Places in 1978.

== History ==
The Shelburne Hotel gained a reputation as a home to entertainers and celebrities, due to its close proximity to Atlantic City's famed Warner Theater, including among them businessman "Diamond Jim" Brady and his companion, actress and singer Lillian Russell; composer and singer George M. Cohan; British actress Lillie Langtry; composer Irving Berlin; actress Ethel Barrymore; composer and conductor John Philip Sousa; and entertainer Al Jolson.

Despite its tower addition in 1926, the Shelburne was a relatively small hotel in comparison to Atlantic City's much bigger resorts such as the Chalfonte-Haddon Hall Hotel, Traymore, and Claridge. This coupled with the Great Depression bankrupted the hotel in 1931. It would pass through a series of owners until being taken over by the United States Army during World War II, then passing into ownership of the Malamut family who briefly revived the hotels success in the 1950s with several renovation and motel expansions.

After the legalization of casino gambling in 1975, the Shelburne once again became hot property, as with most hotels in Atlantic City at the time. The Malamut family closed the resort in 1978 after leasing it to Japanese investors Rocky Aoki and Takashi Sasakawa, owners of the Benihana restaurant chain, who planned to keep the existing hotel as well as add a 31-story tower and casino calling it the Benihana Casino-Hotel. In 1983, work crews began to renovate the hotel, however, disagreements between the Malamut family, the New Jersey Casino Control Commission, and outside investors led Aoki and Sasakawa to abandon the project after investing over $25 million in construction and renovations. Sasakawa was the son of noted Japanese philanthropist Ryoichi Sasakawa, who had links with the Yakuza. Aoki and Sasakawa had also faced charges by the Securities and Exchange Commission for insider trading in the stock of Hardwicke Companies, which had planned to manage the hotel/casino.

In 1984, the site was acquired by Blumenfeld Development Corp. and the hotel was demolished. In 1986, a groundbreaking was held for the intended construction of the Carousel Club Hotel Casino (originally called Carnival Club Hotel Casino). However, the company did not obtain sufficient financing and after foreclosure the property was sold to Bally's Manufacturing Corp., which built Bally's Wild Wild West Casino in 1997.

== See also ==
- National Register of Historic Places listings in Atlantic County, New Jersey
