= Ocean Casino Resort =

Casino hotel in New Jersey, United States

Coordinates: 39°21′42.30″N 74°24′48.59″W

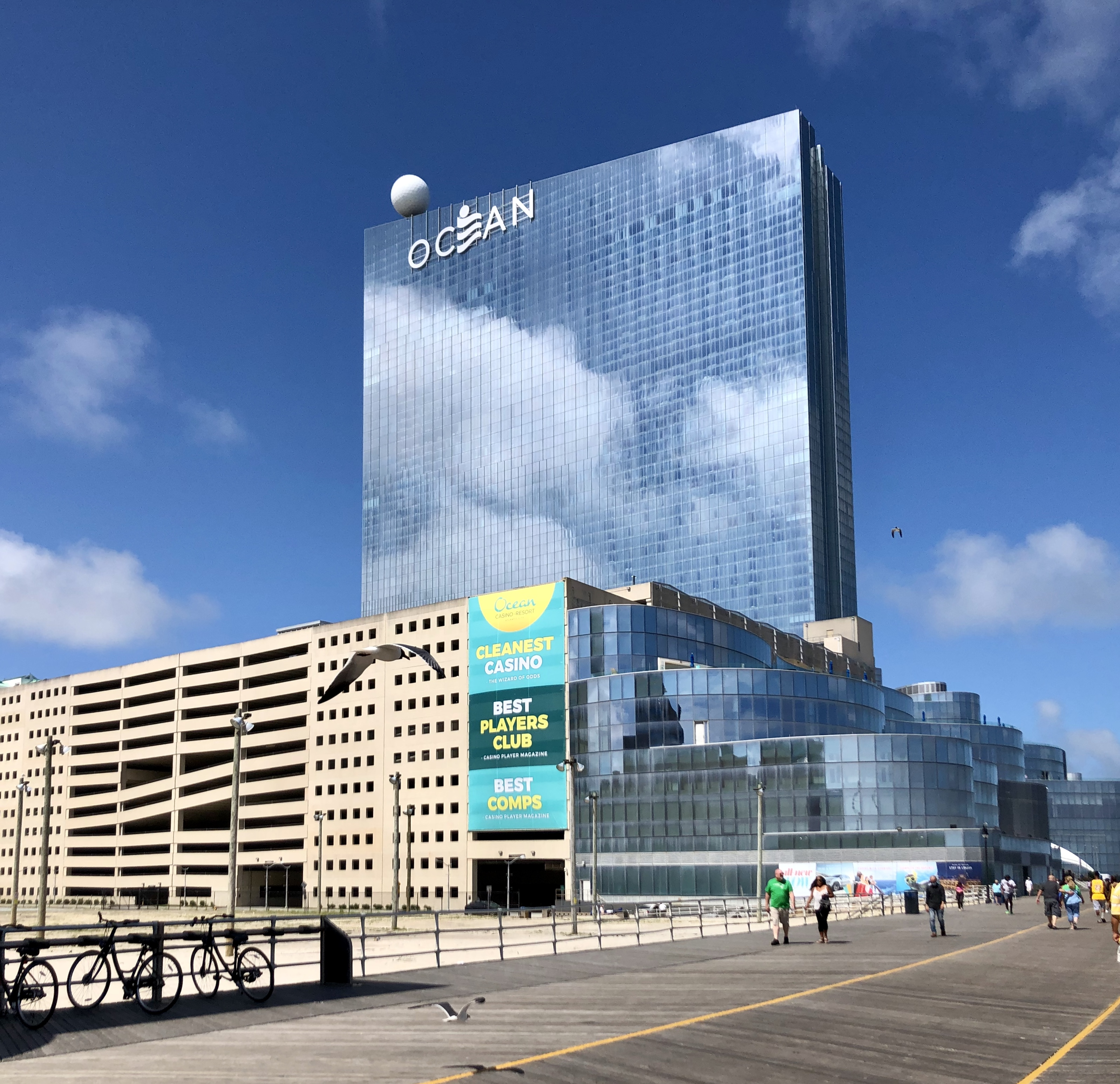
- Ocean Resort Casino, seen from the boardwalk in 2020
- Interactive map of Ocean Casino Resort
- Location: 500 Boardwalk Atlantic City, New Jersey 08401 U.S. (North end of Boardwalk)
- Opened: April 2, 2012; 14 years ago (as Revel); June 27, 2018; 8 years ago (as Ocean)
- Closed: September 2, 2014; 12 years ago (as Revel)
- Theme: Ocean, Underwater environment
- No. of rooms: 1,900
- Gaming space: 130,000 sq.ft.
- Owner: Ilitch Gaming
- Architect: Arquitectonica
- Previous names: Revel Atlantic City
- Website: www.theoceanac.com

Ocean Casino Resort (formerly Revel Casino Hotel) is a resort, hotel, and casino in Atlantic City, New Jersey. The venue is the northernmost casino on the Atlantic City Boardwalk, located on 20 acres (8.1 ha) of land, adjacent to the Showboat Hotel. It is notable for its white sphere structure atop its roof away from the Boardwalk, capable of displaying a wide variety of colors and designs thanks to the LEDs inside it.

Revel opened on April 2, 2012, and after declaring Chapter 11 bankruptcy for the second time, closed on September 2, 2014. Revel was the third of four Atlantic City casinos to close in 2014. Later that month, on September 11, 2014, the casino reached a deal to sell itself to Glenn Straub's Polo North Country Club, a developer based in Florida, for $90 million, a fraction of the cost of construction. The sale plan failed, and Revel was planned to be sold at a September 30, 2014 auction to Brookfield Asset Management for $110 million. On November 19, Brookfield Management reneged on the deal. On April 7, 2015, Revel was sold to Polo North Country Club for $82 million. One of the property's tenants and new management of the property announced plans to reopen Revel under the name TEN.

After multiple struggles of reopening the properties and the anticipated opening dates being announced then delayed, the casino never opened to the public under the ownership of Straub. In January 2018, the sale of the property was announced and it reopened as Ocean Resort Casino on June 27, 2018. In August 2026, Ilitch Gaming acquired full control of Ocean Casino Resort.

== Design and construction ==
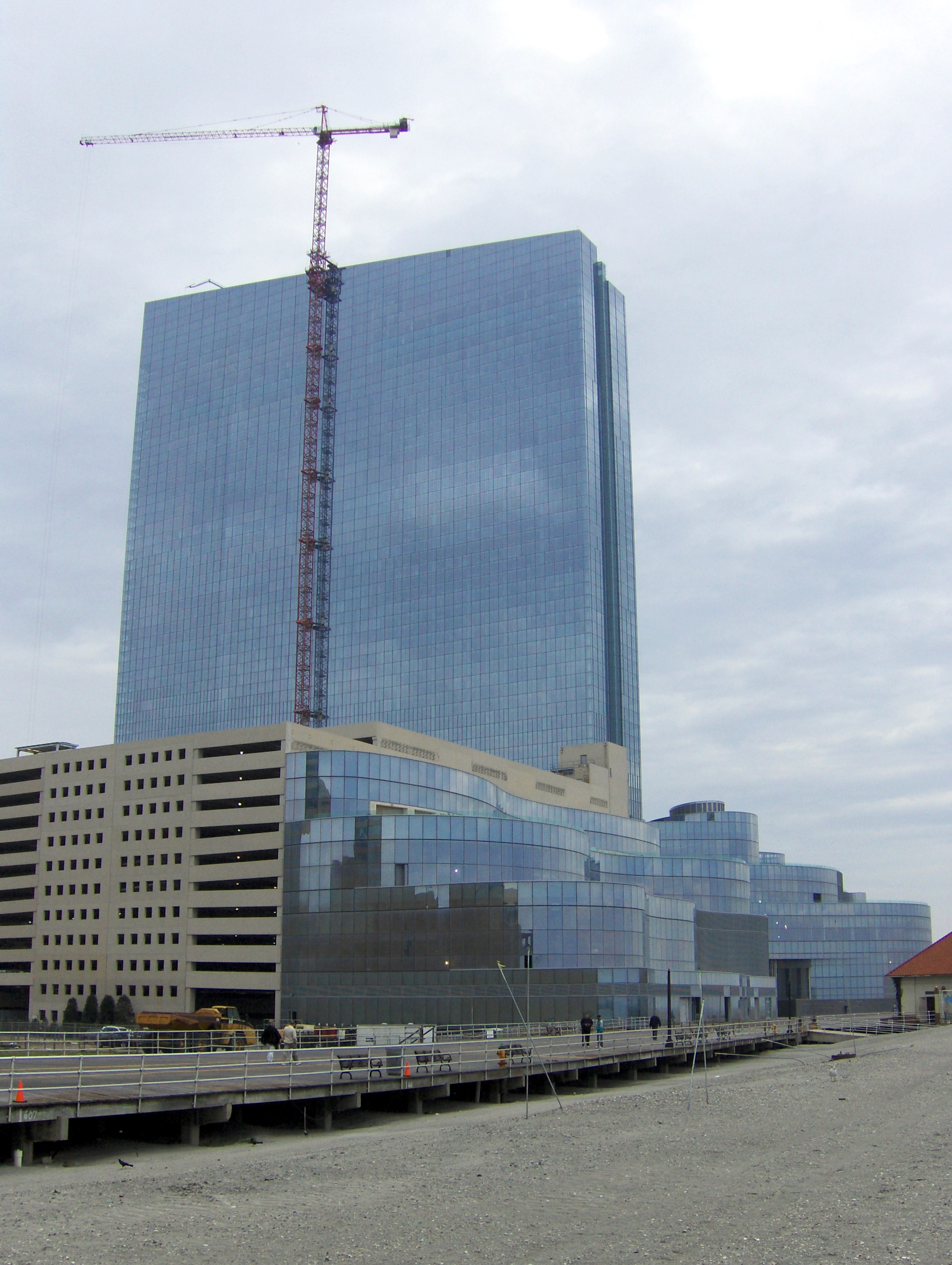
View of the construction of the Revel Resort from the beach in October 2011

Ocean Casino Resort's hotel tower is the tallest structure in Atlantic City and one of the tallest in the state of New Jersey at 710 feet high; and is the second tallest casino tower in the United States. Arquitectonica was the design architect of the project. BLT Architects was the executive architect for the entirety of the project and architect of record for 75% of the facility. Tishman Realty & Construction, which served as construction manager for The Borgata, performed the same role at Revel. Scéno Plus, a Montreal-based design firm, aided in the conceptualization and implementation of Revel's 130,000 square feet (12,000 m^{2}) casino. In the summer of 2008 the project was officially scaled back to include just one hotel tower with 1,900 rooms due to lack of financing. In March 2009, construction was stopped because of difficulties in raising the financing necessary to complete the project. Revel resumed construction in February 2011 after new financing was secured, and opened with 1399 rooms.

== Ovation Hall ==
Ovation Hall is the 5,500-capacity multi-purpose venue at Ocean. Opened with the building in 2012, it has hosted acts like Maroon 5, Beyoncé, Brooks & Dunn, and Duran Duran.

== Amenities ==
The former Revel Casino Hotel featured two nightclubs, 13 restaurants, two live entertainment venues and multiple swimming pools. The resort featured a 2-acre (8,100 m^{2}) landscaped rooftop deck containing outdoor pools, cabanas, fire pits and a "pine grove" (known as Sky Garden) with more than 30,000 live trees and plants. The casino was located six stories above the ocean, and a three-story nightclub overlooked the lobby. Revel was completely smoke-free upon opening, but the resort announced in early 2013 that it would create a smoking area.

=== Gaming ===
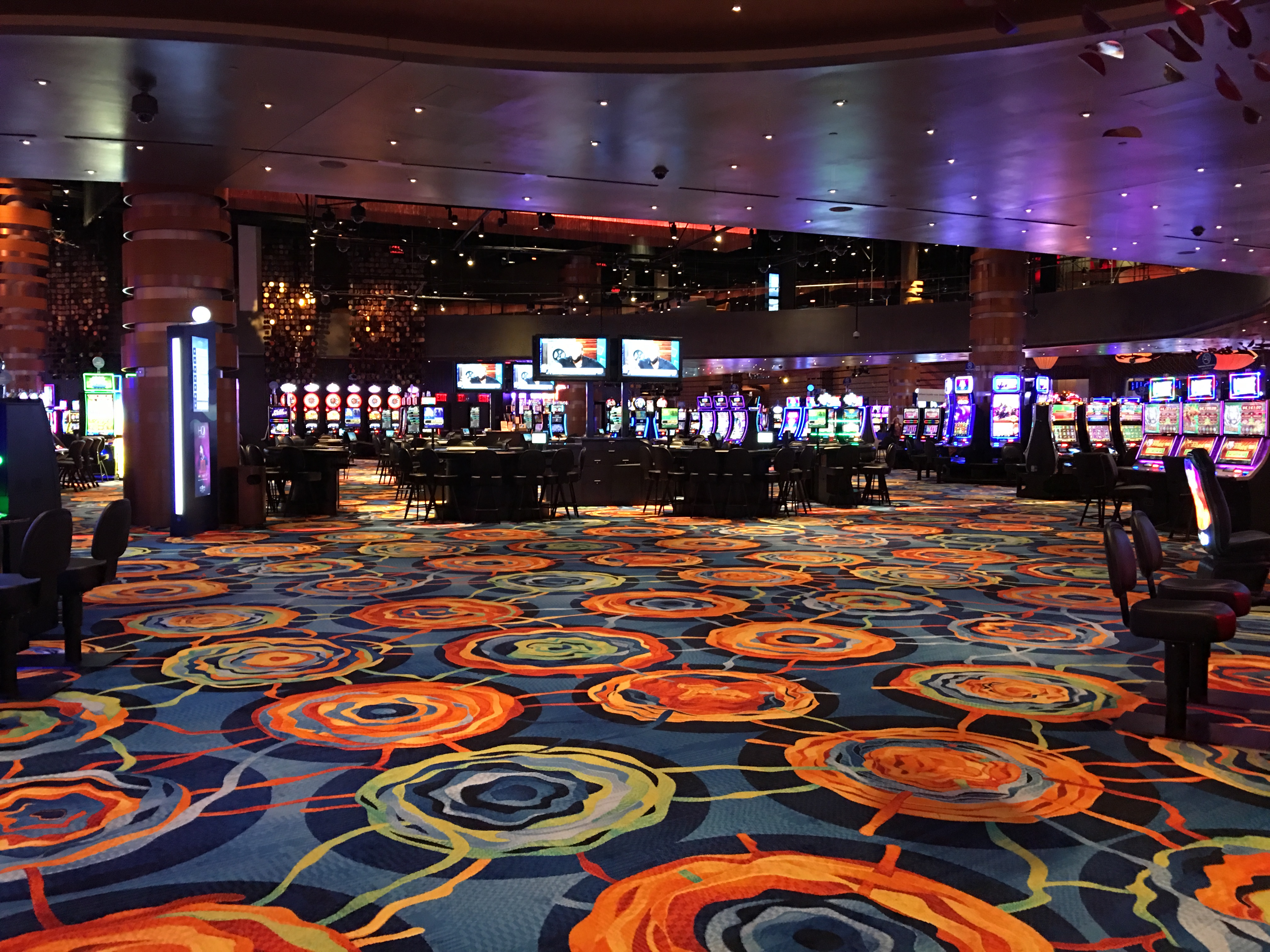
A gaming pit at the resort

Revel Atlantic City had 130,000 sq ft (12,000 m^{2}) of gaming space, more than 2,500 slot machines, and 120 table games. The casino was separated into several areas, including the following:

- Poker room (closed in August 2013)
- Table games – Featured over 120 table games, including blackjack, craps, mini-baccarat, roulette, Let It Ride, Big Six wheel, three card poker, four card poker, Fortune Pai Gow poker, and Spanish 21.

=== Dining ===
The resort had three main restaurants and ten less formal dining options.

=== Events ===
Sports
Boxing and mixed martial arts matches are held at the casino.

== Incidents ==
=== Construction safety incidents ===
A tower crane on the Revel construction site collapsed in high winds on March 13, 2010, injuring one person on the ground. On March 20, 2010, the use of welding torches to remove the collapsed crane sparked a rooftop fire. The damage from the fire was minor, and there were no injuries.

Lightning from a brief, intense storm struck three concrete workers on September 15, 2011, killing one. On September 30, 2011, a worker was listed in critical condition with a head injury after falling off a ladder.

=== Escalator ===
In August 2012, an English tourist was saved by bystanders after his clothing caught in the escalator at Revel. Besides tattered clothes, he suffered a broken leg.

On September 10, 2012, a customer was severely injured at Revel when he fell off an escalator to the floor 40 feet (12 m) below.

=== Ray Rice incident ===
On September 8, 2014, National Football League (NFL) running back Ray Rice was suspended indefinitely following release by TMZ of a video recording showing him assaulting his fiancée in an elevator at Revel earlier in the year. The publication of the security video forced the Baltimore Ravens and the NFL to revisit their positions on the matter, leading the league to extend Rice's suspension (formerly for two weeks) and the team to release him. The only public video previously available was from outside the elevator and showed Ray Rice dragging his unconscious fiancée partially out of the elevator before a hotel employee stopped to help them.

== History ==
=== Revel (2012–14) ===
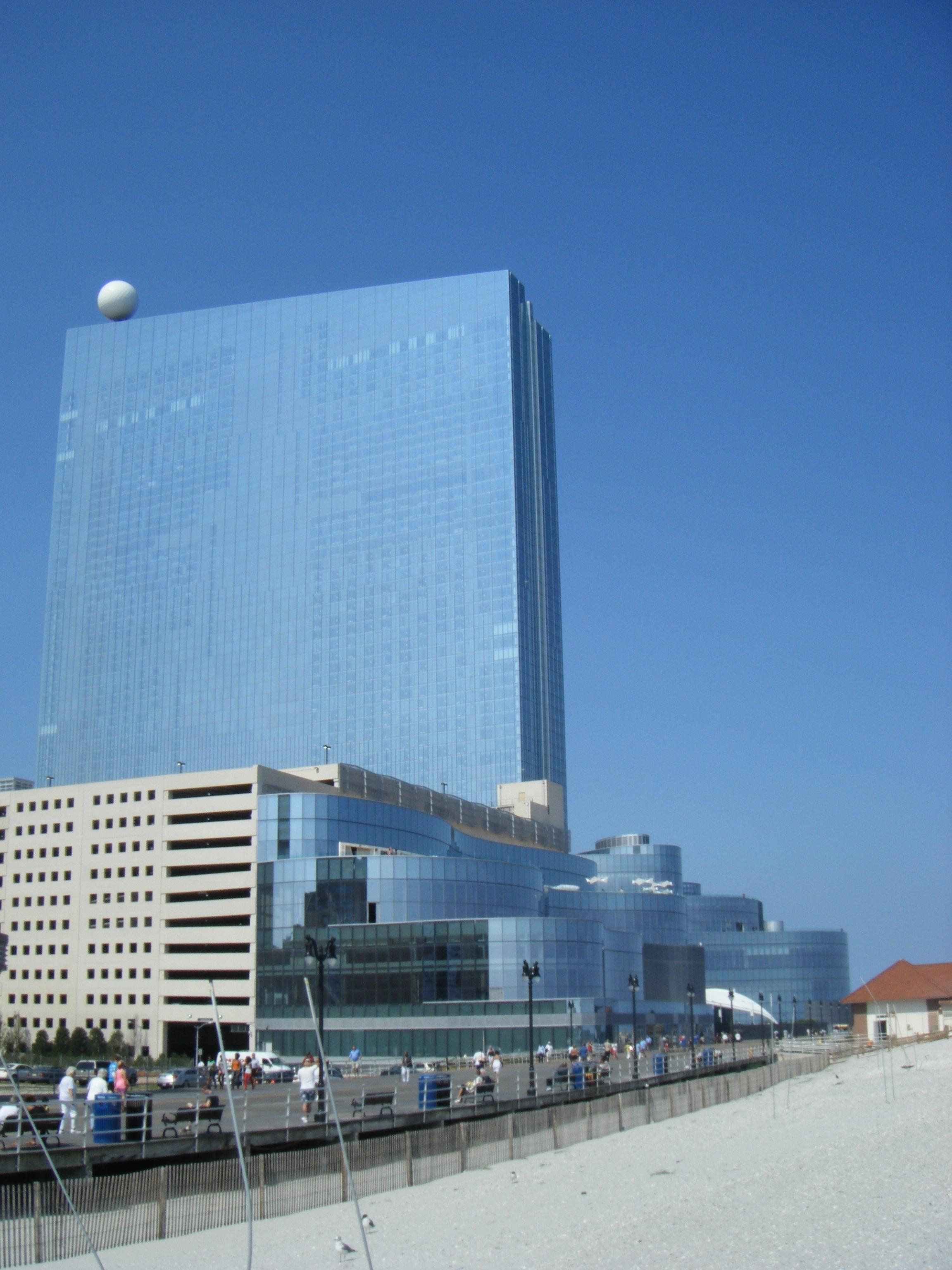
Revel Atlantic City in 2012

==== Financial problems and closure ====
Construction of the resort cost $2.4 billion. Global financial company Morgan Stanley, the owner of 90% of Revel Entertainment Group, decided in April 2010 to discontinue construction, put its stake in Revel up for sale and walk away from its $932 million investment. On February 1, 2011, as part of his plan to revitalize Atlantic City, Governor Chris Christie announced that the State of New Jersey would provide tax incentives up to $261 million in the stalled project in exchange for 20% of certain equity distributions. The tax incentives would be paid for by a portion of state taxes generated by the project. None of the $261 million in tax incentives was paid to Revel. On February 17, 2011, Revel Entertainment Group, LLC announced that it completed a $1.15 billion financing package which enabled the company to complete construction of Revel.

Revel lost $35 million in the 2nd quarter of 2012, and lost $37 million in the 3rd quarter of 2012. In August 2012, Moody's Investor Services and Standard and Poor's downgraded Revel's credit to Caa2 and CCC, respectively. On August 20, 2012, Revel asked lenders for a $100 million credit cushion. In November 2012, casino officials warned federal regulators about growing debt load of more than $1.3 billion could lead to bankruptcy or foreclosure if revenues did not increase in the foreseeable future. Atlantic City officials noted that Revel owed $12 million in unpaid property taxes, and Unite Here Local 54 said that Revel owed $51 million to contractors. A month later, Revel stated that it had received another $150 million in loans, including a $125 million term loan and a $25 million increase to an existing $100 million revolving loan.

In early 2013, because of uncertainty about whether Revel would have enough revenue to pay back its loans, Moody's and Standard and Poor's downgraded Revel's credit rating again to Caa3 and CC, respectively. On February 19, 2013, Revel announced that it was filing for Chapter 11 bankruptcy. The prepackaged bankruptcy will include immediate payment of all priority claims (e.g., vendors, taxes), and the reduction of Revel's debt from $1.503 billion to $272 million in exchange for the transfer of all of Revel's equity to the creditors. As part of its bankruptcy filing, Revel declared that the casino's value had dropped from $2.4 billion to $450 million, and predicted that Revel would not be profitable until 2017. In an attempt to attract more business, Revel created a smoking area and reduced hotel room prices, and planned to create an inexpensive food court, and a private lounge for high rollers.

On June 19, 2014, Revel once again filed a Chapter 11 bankruptcy petition, warning of closing in early September if a buyer was not found.

On August 12, 2014, Revel announced that no suitable bids were received, and that it would close by September 1. By August 18, Revel Casino Hotel announced the official closing.

The hotel, resort, and casino closed permanently on September 2, 2014. Revel was the third Atlantic City casino to close in 2014, after Showboat Hotel Casino closed on August 31, following the Atlantic Club Hotel Casino. The hotel was closed on September 1, 2014, at 11:00 am and the casino was closed the next day at 6:00 am. All reservations after September 1 were canceled and room deposits were automatically refunded. All Revel guests who self-parked or utilized the valet were required to remove their parked cars from the facility by 9:00 am on September 2.

Revel Group LLC, headed by former Revel Atlantic City CEO Kevin DeSanctis, released a statement on September 22, 2014, announcing Revel Group was terminating its license agreement with Revel, citing "the property has failed to use the licensed marks in a manner consistent with Revel's standards of quality as provided for in its License Agreement."

Toronto-based Brookfield US Holdings LLC won a bankruptcy court auction for Revel on October 1, 2014, and planned to reopen it as-is. It submitted a bid of $110 million in an auction.

A bankruptcy court hearing to approve the sale was scheduled for October 7, 2014. An opposing bidder, Florida developer Glenn Straub (Miami Area), was selected as the backup bidder in case the Brookfield bid did not close on the deal. Brookfield Management reneged on this deal on November 19, 2014. On January 5, 2015, a federal bankruptcy judge approved the sale of Revel to Polo North Country Club, Inc., led by Straub. On February 11, 2015, due to court battles, the sale to Straub was canceled by Revel. Then, on April 6, 2015, Straub got approval to discuss the sale of the casino to him.

On April 7, 2015, Revel was sold to Glenn Straub's Polo North Country Club for $82 million.

=== Events after sale to Polo North (2015–18) ===
Two days after Revel was sold to Polo North Country Club, on the afternoon of April 9, 2015; ACR, owner of the Energetic Inlet District Energy Center (which is the sole source of primary power, backup power, and hot and chilled water to the Revel) stopped supplying power and water to the building.

On April 29, 2015, after 20 days without power or water, U.S. District Judge Jerome Simandle ordered power and chilled water to be restored to the Revel under a two-week deal between Straub and ACR. Revel facilities staff said limited power was restored around 11:00 am that morning, and engineers said there was no damage done to the building. The deal was later enforced indefinitely.

Revel's chief engineer, John Lezenby, resigned on June 9, 2015, leaving behind nine engineers and four security guards to continue to run the Revel's critical systems. Lezenby stated the uncertain future of the building and the fact that it was closed to the public as reasons for his resignation.

In late June, U.S. Bankruptcy Judge Michael Kaplan ruled that Revel owner Polo North Country Club Inc. must allow tenants access to the property "to preserve physical assets, as well as to investigate, plan, and take the necessary steps to restart operations."

On September 30, Glenn Straub expelled nine unionized workers from the property, leaving the Revel's command center unstaffed. He said the union engineers, from Local 68 of the International Union of Operating Engineers, were overpaid, and announced that Siemens was in the process of training new engineers within 30 days. Engineers have since returned to the property.

On October 9, 2015, Atlantic City Sewerage Co. announced it was suing to bar sewer service to the Revel, citing Polo North owing it more than $162,000. On November 17, an attorney for Polo North said the Revel was "cold, dark and on the verge of suffering widespread property damage", only receiving chilled water since a dispute in April.

On November 24, Glenn Straub announced he was buying the Energenic power plant from ACR. ACR previously warned the city that bondholders were planning to foreclose on the power plant. The deal was announced after Atlantic City threatened to issue fines and said it would consider litigation if the building's interior dipped below 40 degrees.

On January 12, 2016, Polo North announced it had completed purchase of the Energenic power plant, and introduced heat and full electricity back to the Revel.

Also in January, Straub announced his plans for the former Revel Resort, including a smaller casino, water park, and other family attractions. He initially planned to reopen the resort on June 15, 2016.

On the night of February 29, 2016, the signature Pearl at the top of Revel was lit for the first time since the resort closed. The next morning on March 1, Straub said it was part of an ongoing effort to test systems at the Revel in preparation for the anticipated June 15 opening. Straub also said he expected to have 500 hotel rooms ready to go and most, if not all, of the property's restaurants up and running, stating that the restaurants' owners had been wanting to reopen since the property originally closed. Additionally, he stated the reopened resort would not be named Revel, but he had yet to decide on a name.

On Tuesday, March 15, 2016, Atlantic City officials Dale Finch (Director of Licence & Inspections) Elizabeth Terenik (Director of Planning & Development), Scott Evans (Fire Chief), and Wally Shields (Construction Official) conducted an inspection of Revel, escorted by Revel's facilities manager. After a 90-minute tour, officials stated that Revel was ready for business, and that it was “amazingly intact” and in “great condition”, dispelling many rumors about the condition of the property.

The officials also said that clubs were ready but HQ was not part of the reopening plan; the swimming pools were in good condition; there were at least 500 guest rooms that were ready, clean and complete with bedding, artwork, lighting, and other fixtures; and that restaurants and gaming floors were ready for use. In addition, there was now a ropes course in the lobby. As stated above, several bankruptcy court orders protected HQ's right to operate at the facility. Glenn Straub said a job fair was planned and that Polo North was looking to bring back as many former Revel employees as possible to the new Revel, and that it was ready to open as soon as possible.

As of June 13, 2016, Glenn Straub announced plans to reopen the resort with a small casino, rope-climbing course, water park, a zip line, an e-sports lounge, equestrian facility, beach cabanas, and a bike endurance course in a section of the modern parking garage. Surfing, wind surfing, and scuba lessons would be available.

The new resort would feature a 32-room spa where guests could have medical beauty treatments performed. In July, a white-sand beach area with pools and volleyball courts dubbed Nikki Beach will open in the former porte cochere area.

Later in the year, ten restaurants were scheduled to open, along with a rock-climbing wall, three 75-seat movie theaters, a skydiving course, and a heliport for high rollers to be flown to and from Revel.

Staub gave a hint about the new name stating, "we have some Asian painters coming up with the artwork". Straub's team had not held a job fair or hired staff to run the operation, apart from the few facilities and security staff that were inherited with the purchase of the Revel in 2015. Straub said anyone who learned the resort was open, was welcome to check in. The property was renamed TEN Atlantic City in September 2016, with an opening predicted for early 2017, but this did not happen.

=== Ocean (2018–present) ===
On January 9, 2018, the hotel was sold for $200 million to AC Ocean Walk, whose majority owner was Bruce Deifik, and renamed Ocean Resort Casino, with a reopening announced for Summer 2018.

In late January 2018, the online casino supplier GAN announced it would power an online gambling arm of the Ocean Resort Casino and anticipated the site's launching in 2018.

On April 2, 2018, it was announced that the resort would join Hyatt Hotels' unbranded Unbound Collection.

In May 2018, the Ocean Resort Casino partnered with William Hill to offer sports betting. Additionally that month, casino officials confirmed a June 28 reopening date. After receiving approval from state gaming regulators, the property opened on June 27, 2018.

In July 2018, the Ocean Resort Casino launched an online casino with over 50 available slot games. Players must be in New Jersey and at least 21 years of age to play.

On November 11, 2018, Ocean Resort Casino will begin issuing the Ocean Premier Honor Card, a Gold tier players club loyalty card for active-duty military and veterans.

On January 10, 2019, AC Ocean Walk's majority owner Bruce Deifik announced that the casino had been sold to an unidentified owner for an unspecified price. Deifik said the new owner planned to invest an additional $70 million into upgrading the venue. On January 28, the new owner was identified as Luxor Capital Group LP, a New York-based hedge fund with around $3.2 billion in assets under management. Luxor was among the groups that provided financing for Deifik's 2018 purchase of the venue.

With the takeover by the new owners and under the direction of the trustee Eric Matejevich, the property was renamed Ocean Casino Resort on April 10, 2019, to indicate a shift in direction and the emphasis on its casino operation.

On December 28, 2020, Ocean Casino Resort announced the opening of "The Cove", a new high-limit slots area covering 7,450-square-feet. The new development cost around $2 million and houses approximately 140 slot machines. The Cove also contains a bar with a selection of alcohol with cocktail service and a dedicated cage.

In 2022, the Casino debuted a new sports bar and gaming area called “The Gallery Bar, Book & Games,” with a 100-foot elevated bar and lounge and 140 feet of LED walls. Additionally, a $75 million investment resulted in the completion of 460 guest rooms and suites on 12 floors, which had sat empty since the building was constructed. These rooms are called BLU Rooms. Serendipity 3, a NYC restaurant, opened an outpost in the hotel on June 1, 2022, followed by a new Starbucks that summer.

The resort underwent a $50 million renovation in 2025. It refurbished 559 hotel rooms, making every room on the property a BLU room, expanded casino space, new restaurants and an eighteen hole mini golf course called Ocean's 18.

The Ilitch family purchased a 50% stake in the property from Luxor Capital in 2021, and then purchased the other 50% in 2026.

== See also ==
- Gambling in New Jersey
- List of tallest buildings in Atlantic City
- List of tallest buildings in New Jersey
- List of tallest hotels in the world
- List of integrated resorts

Preceded by Harrah's Waterfront Tower	Tallest Building in Atlantic City; 710 feet (220 m); 2010–present	Incumbent
