= Borgata =

Hotel and casino in Atlantic City, New Jersey

Coordinates: 39.37749°N 74.43510°W

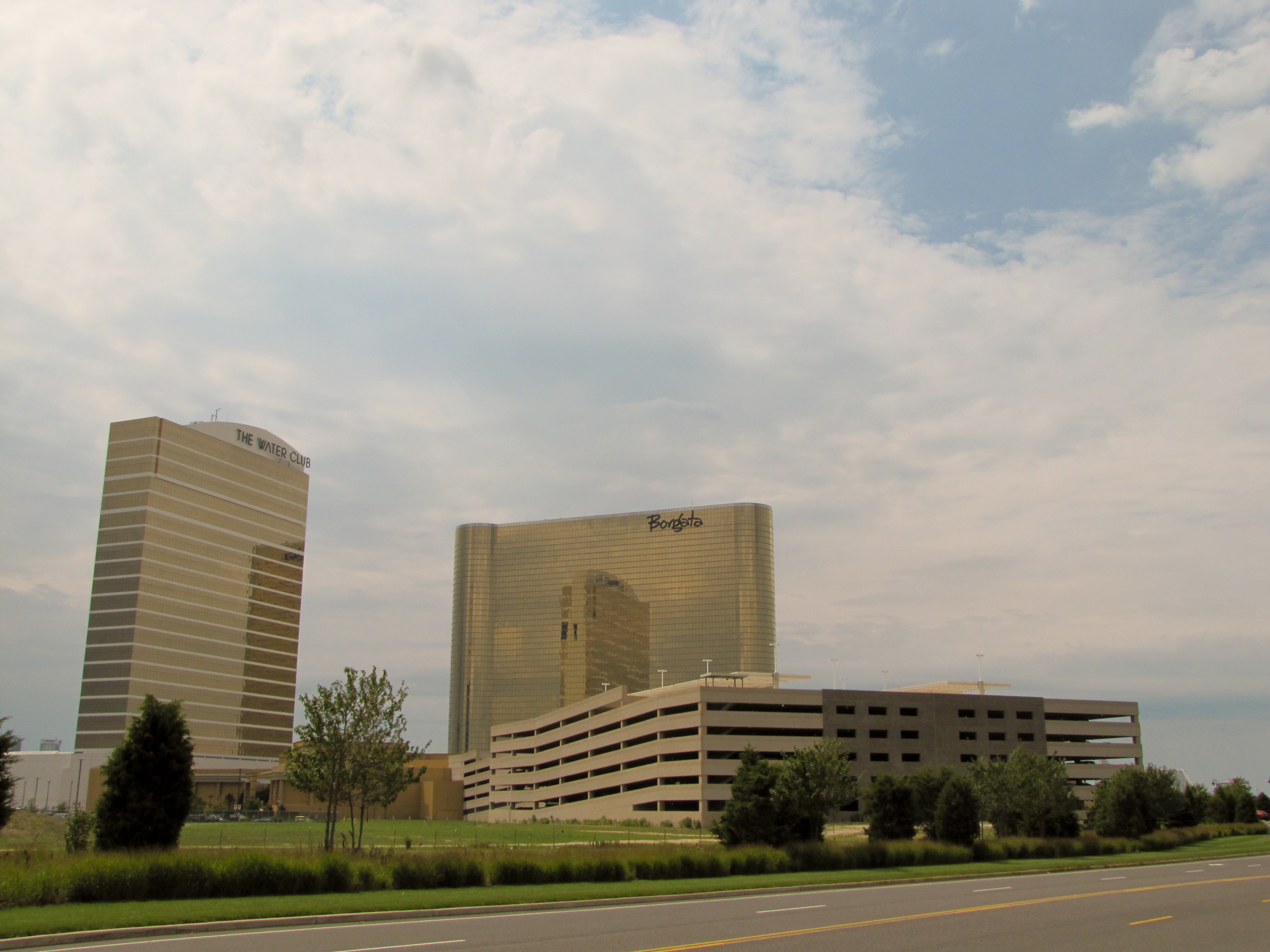
- Borgata and MGM Tower
- Interactive map of Borgata Hotel Casino & Spa
- Location: Atlantic City, New Jersey; 1 Borgata Way
- Opened: July 2, 2003; 23 years ago
- Theme: Tuscany, Modernism
- No. of rooms: 2,767
- Gaming space: 161,000 sq ft (15,000 m^{2})
- Permanent shows: Borgata Comedy Club
- Signature attractions: Borgata Poker Room
- Notable restaurants: American Grille; Angeline by Michael Symon; Noodles; B-Prime; Old Homestead Steakhouse
- Casino type: Land-based
- Owner: Vici Properties
- Operating license holder: MGM Resorts International
- Architect: BLT Architects, Cope Linder Architects, SOSH Architects (Interior Design/Renovations)
- Renovated in: 2005, 2007, 2011
- Website: theborgata.com

Borgata Hotel Casino & Spa is a hotel, casino, and spa in Atlantic City, New Jersey. It is owned by Vici Properties and operated by MGM Resorts International. The casino hotel features 2,798 rooms and is the largest hotel in New Jersey. Borgata opened in July 2003 and is the top-grossing casino in Atlantic City.

== History ==
Borgata was part of a major project in Atlantic City nicknamed "The Tunnel Project", started around 1999. When Steve Wynn planned the Le Jardin in Atlantic City, he wanted to connect a $330 million 2.5-mile (4.0 km) tunnel from the Atlantic City Expressway to the new resort, later named the Atlantic City–Brigantine Connector, which would funnel incoming traffic off the Atlantic City Expressway into the city's marina district. This caused major controversy, as it would cut through a residential neighborhood; competitor Donald Trump sued Wynn for it saying that it was a "driveway" to Wynn's casino. The Tunnel Project did progress, even after Le Jardin was cancelled, and finally opened in 2001.

Borgata opened on July 2, 2003, at 11:45 pm, as a joint venture between MGM Mirage and Boyd Gaming. The main tower—the third tallest building in Atlantic City—is visible from many miles away due to its facade of reflective gold glass. The firms Marnell Corrao Associates of Las Vegas, and Philadelphia's Bower Lewis and Thrower Architects (BLT) worked on the project.

According to an Atlantic City Weekly article from 2004, Steve Wynn reportedly had visited and toured the Borgata.

In late 2005 and early 2006, Borgata underwent a $200 million casino and retail expansion, and the new wing opened in June 2006. As part of the expansion, Borgata expanded the poker room, becoming the largest in Atlantic City and the second largest in the country. In June 2008, Borgata opened its second hotel, The Water Club.

In early 2010, it was reported that MGM Mirage might sell its ownership share in Borgata. On March 12, 2010, MGM Mirage announced it would sell its stake in Borgata and stop doing business as a gaming licensee in New Jersey. On March 17, 2010, MGM Mirage announced that the New Jersey Casino Control Commission (CCC) approved the settlement agreement between the Company and the New Jersey Division of Gaming Enforcement (DGE) under which the Company would sell its 50% ownership interest in the Borgata.

In September 2014, the CCC reversed its earlier decision and allowed MGM back into the state, after finding that Pansy Ho's role in MGM Macau had been reduced.

MGM agreed in May 2016 to purchase Boyd's 50 percent stake in the Borgata for $900 million in cash and assumed debt. MGM then sold the property to its affiliated real estate investment trust, MGM Growth Properties, for $1.18 billion and leased it back. The sale to MGM Resorts was completed in August 2016.

Vici Properties acquired MGM Growth, including the Borgata, in 2022.

== Gaming ==
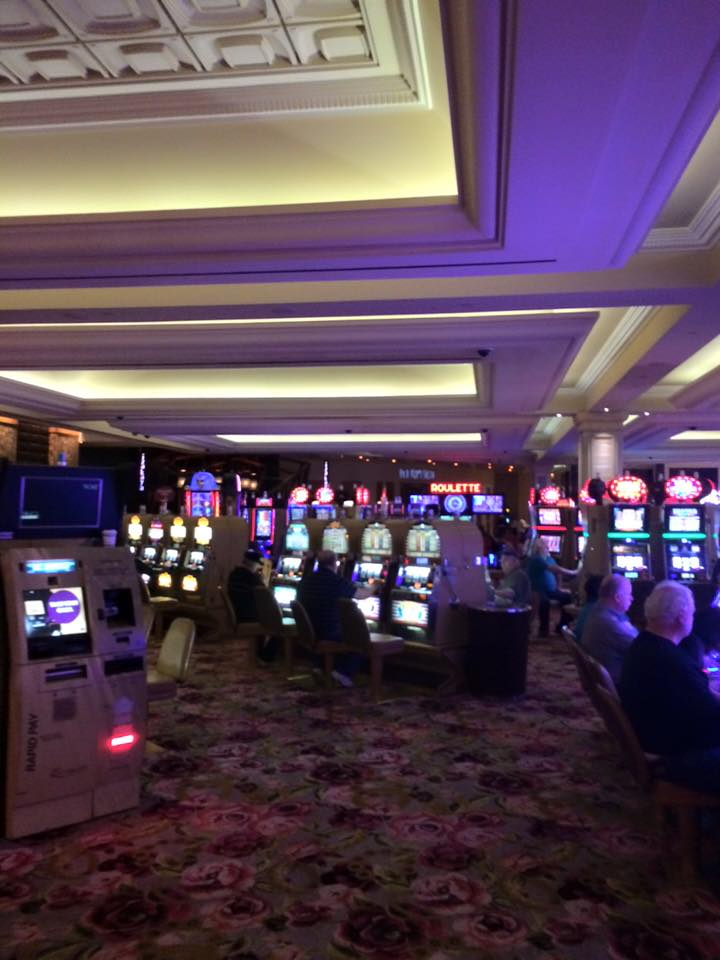
The casino area of Borgata

The 161,000-square-foot (15,000 m^{2}) casino floor offers about 4,000 slot machines, 180 table games, and 50 poker tables. Borgata's poker program features daily tournaments and high-stake tournaments in conjunction with the World Poker Tour. For weekly events, buy-ins range from $30 to $1,000, but the hotel also hosts other major events throughout the year. The Borgata also has a sportsbook called the Race & Sports Book that offers sports betting.

Borgata has extensive online gambling operations.

In 2009, a player at the casino broke records at the craps tables, rolling a pair of dice 154 times, including 25 passes, without "sevening out". Patricia Demauro, a New Jersey grandmother, had a lucky streak which lasted four hours and 18 minutes, breaking the world records for the longest craps roll and the most successive dice rolls without "sevening out".

== Hotel towers ==
=== Main tower ===
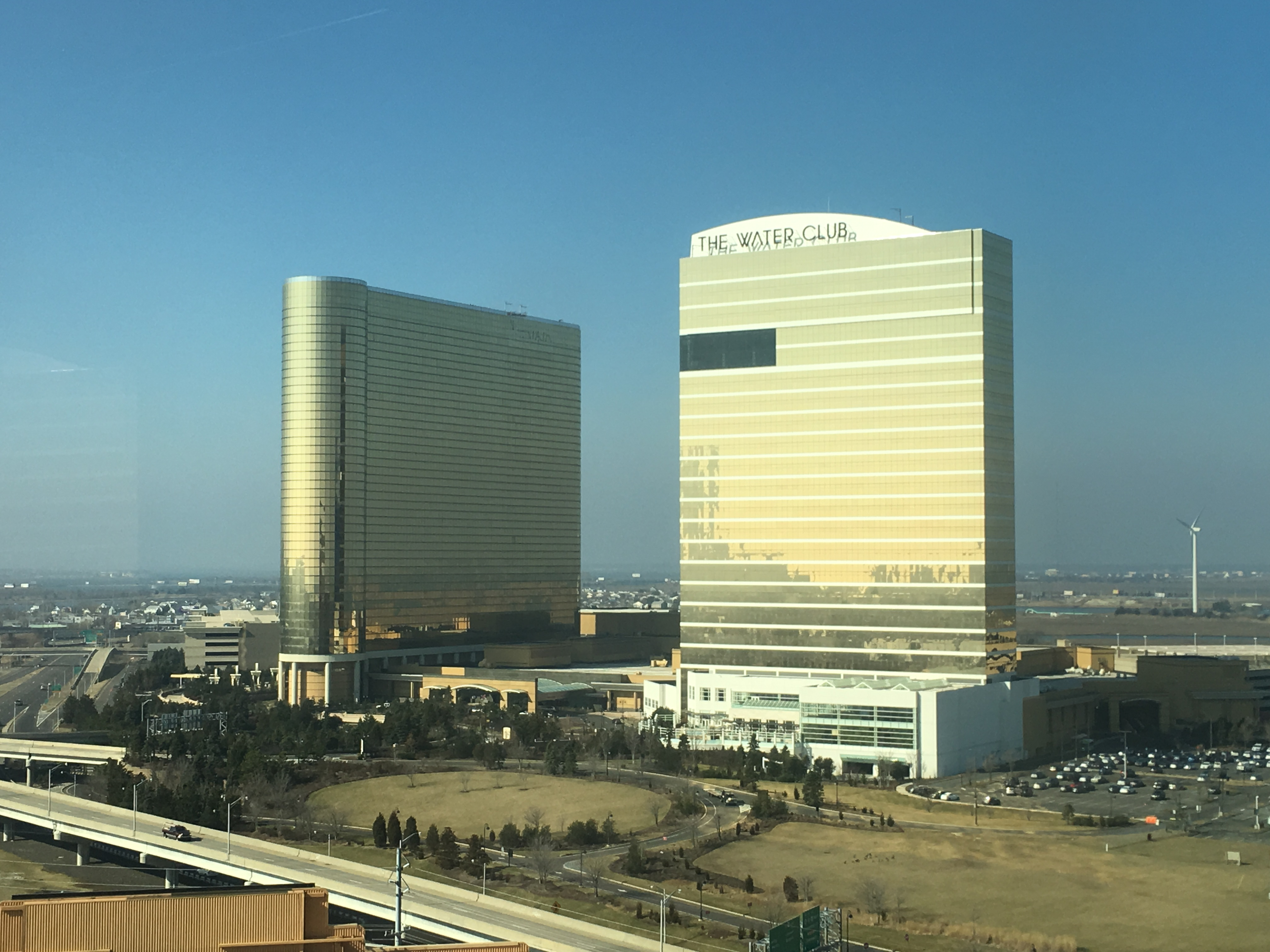
Exterior of the Borgata and the MGM Tower, 2016

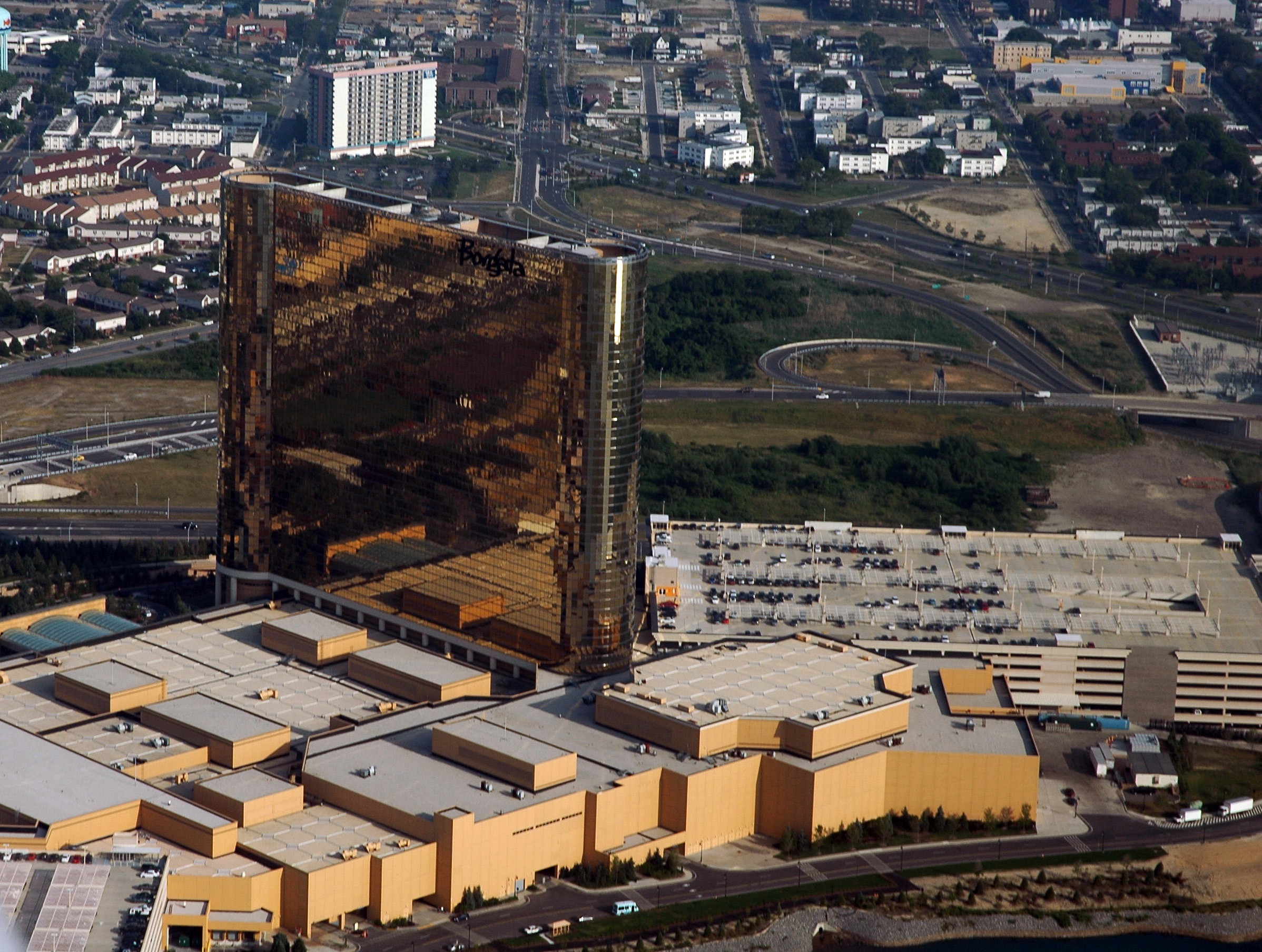
Borgata from the back

The Main Tower at Borgata stands 431 ft (131 m) tall and contains 1,997 guest rooms and suites. It was opened in conjunction with Borgata in 2003.

=== MGM Tower ===
MGM Tower is a 38-story, $400 million boutique hotel connected to Borgata. It was originally named The Water Club. Built in 2008, it features 800 guestrooms and suites; Immersion, a two-story spa on the 32nd floor, 18,000 square feet of meeting and event space, three residences, five pools (indoor and outdoor), and retail shops.

== Entertainment ==
=== Borgata Event Center ===
The Borgata Event Center is the main music venue for the resort. The capacity is 2,400.

The venue can be converted into the Borgata Ballroom, a special events center for formal dinners, receptions, training, or business presentations. It has a capacity of 3,200 (theatre) and 1,700 (banquet).

=== Borgata Festival Park ===
Opened in 2015, the Borgata Festival Park, an outdoor venue, is used during the summer months and has a capacity of 4,500.

=== Borgata Music Box ===
The Borgata Music Box is a versatile venue used for music and comedy acts. The capacity is 1,000. It converts to the Borgata Theater, a private venue designed for meetings and presentations. The theater is designed for crystal clear sound, with a capacity to hold 1,000 people. In 2013, comedian Lewis Black performed his ninth stand-up comedy special at the Borgata Music Box.

=== Boxing and mixed martial arts ===
Boxing and mixed martial arts matches are held at the casino.

== Spa ==
Borgata's spa, named Spa Toccare, is a 54,000-square-foot (5,000 m^{2}) spa with a salon, a barbershop, a fitness center, and an indoor pool.

== In popular culture ==
The Borgata appears in multiple popular culture works, such as:

=== In films ===
Several scenes in the film The Bounty Hunter (2010) were filmed on the premises of the Borgata.

=== In television ===
- The Borgata has been featured three times on the TruTV series Impractical Jokers, in the Season 3 episodes, "Look Out Below", "The Great Escape", and "Fe-Mail".
- The Real Housewives of New Jersey held its Season 2 reunion there in 2010 and its Season 4 reunion there in 2012.
- The hotel and the club mur.mur. were featured in The Real World: New York (Season 21), wherein the roommates from Brooklyn took a road trip to Atlantic City.
- The hotel, casino, the restaurant Izakaya and club mur.mur were featured in The Real Housewives of New York City (Season 7), wherein all the ladies left New York City for a girls weekend retreat for Ramona Singer's birthday.
- The casino scenes in The Sopranos episode "Chasing It" (2007) were filmed at the Borgata.
- Hell's Kitchen (American season 5) had Danny Veltri win the contest, along with $250,000 and the position of Sous Chef at the Italian restaurant Fornelletto at Borgata.

== See also ==
- Gambling in New Jersey
- List of tallest buildings in Atlantic City
- List of integrated resorts

Preceded by Trump Taj Mahal	Tallest Building in Atlantic City; 2003–2008; 431 ft	Succeeded by The Water Club
