= Atlantic Club Casino Hotel =

Closed casino and hotel in Atlantic City, New Jersey

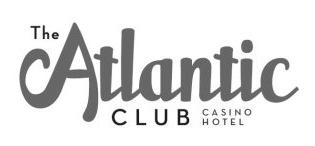

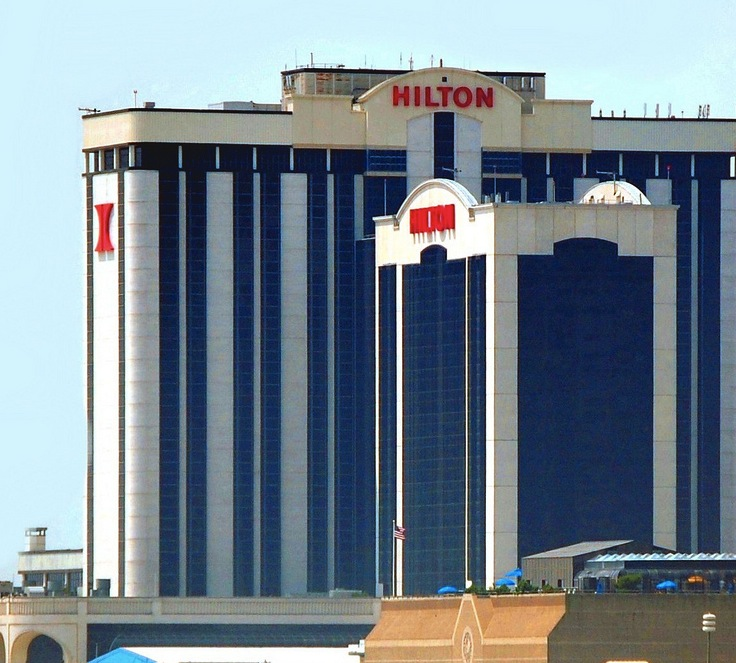
- Atlantic City Hilton (the casino before The Atlantic Club)
- Interactive map of Atlantic Club Casino Hotel
- Location: Atlantic City, New Jersey; Boston Avenue and the Boardwalk; 39.3504°N 74.45051°W
- Opened: December 12, 1980
- Closed: January 13, 2014; 12 years ago
- Theme: Beach Resort
- No. of rooms: 801
- Gaming space: 75,374 sq ft (7,002.5 m^{2})
- Signature attractions: The Beach Bar
- Notable restaurants: Patsy's Italian Restaurant; Simon AC
- Casino type: Land-based
- Owner: TJM Properties
- Previous names: Golden Nugget (1980-1987); Bally's Grand (1987-1996); Atlantic City Hilton (1996-2011); ACH Casino Resort (2011-2012)
- Renovated in: 1997, 2012

The Atlantic Club Casino Hotel, formerly known as Golden Nugget, Bally's Grand, The Grand, Atlantic City Hilton and ACH, is an abandoned hotel and casino located at the southern end of the boardwalk in Atlantic City, New Jersey, owned and operated by Colony Capital. It was the city's first and only "locals casino". The Atlantic Club permanently closed on January 13, 2014, at 12:01 AM, largely as a result of dwindling casino visitors to Atlantic City due to increased competition in neighboring states. A third of Atlantic City's boardwalk casinos closed the same year, the others being Revel, Trump Plaza, and Showboat. Redevelopment proposals include a water park.

On November 6, 2013, Atlantic Club owner Resorts International Holdings, itself owned by Colony Capital, filed for chapter 11 bankruptcy protection and a source revealed to the Wall Street Journal that a bankruptcy sale would occur. On December 23, 2013, Federal Bankruptcy Judge Gloria M. Burns approved the sale of Atlantic Club to Caesars Entertainment Corporation and Tropicana Entertainment. Tropicana acquired the gaming equipment and the data records of customers from Atlantic Club. Caesars acquired the real estate and non-gaming assets. This returned ownership of the property to Caesars Entertainment, which sold it nine years before to Colony Capital as part of its acquisition by Harrah's Entertainment.

== History ==
=== Golden Nugget (1980–1987) ===
The Golden Nugget Hotel & Casino was built in 1980 by a partnership of Golden Nugget Companies and Michael R. Milken for $140 million. Steve Wynn bought the Strand Motel on Boston Avenue and the Boardwalk for $8.5 million and tore it down. Joel Bergman, who designed Wynn's other resorts, designed the Golden Nugget, and Atlandia Design managed the design, construction and furnishing of the original facility. It was Atlantic City's sixth casino after legalized gambling was passed in 1976. It had 506 rooms and at the time was the second smallest casino in the city. By 1983 it was the city's top earning casino. Its entertainment in the 500-seat Opera House included Frank Sinatra, Dean Martin, Sammy Davis Jr., Dolly Parton, Lou Rawls and Don Rickles. Advertisements featured Wynn, including one where he delivered towels to Sinatra. It was Wynn's first major casino after establishing his reputation with resurrecting the Golden Nugget Las Vegas.

=== Bally's Grand (1987–1996) ===
Wynn had high-profile squabbles with state officials, and in 1987 he sold the casino for $440 million to Bally Manufacturing, which changed the name to Bally's Grand Hotel and Casino. Frustrated with state gaming regulators, Wynn publicly vowed he would never return to Atlantic City, though he had hedged his rhetoric with the purchase of an area by the Atlantic City Marina. Wynn left Atlantic City to build The Mirage in Las Vegas that heralded the modern transformation of the Las Vegas Strip.

=== Hilton (1996–2011) ===
After the Hilton Hotels Corporation acquired Bally Entertainment, the property was renamed the Atlantic City Hilton. In 1998, Hilton Corporation spun off its casino properties into a new company initially called Park Place Entertainment.

In 2000 Nicholas L. Ribis, in partnership with Colony Capital, LLC bought the poorly-performing Resorts Atlantic City for $140 million and created Resorts International Holdings. Then, in 2005, they set out to buy four casino properties across the U.S., including the Atlantic City Hilton, for a combined total of $1.24 billion.

Through December 2009, Resorts Atlantic City and the Atlantic City Hilton were managed as a single entity named "Atlantic City Hilton and Resorts Atlantic City", whose president was Anthony Rodio. On December 10, 2009, it was announced that Resorts International was unable to pay the mortgage for the Resorts Atlantic City property and made a deal to have the loan canceled and surrender the property to RAC Atlantic City Holdings L.L.C.

=== ACH Casino Resort (2011–2012) ===
In June 2011, Hilton Hotels ended the licensing agreement with Colony Capital and the Hilton name was officially removed as the casino name, with the temporary name of the casino becoming ACH Casino Resort. The signage on the outside and inside of the casino was removed in the fall when the licensing agreement termination was approved. Its sister property, the Las Vegas Hilton also lost its agreement and changed its name to the LVH – Las Vegas Hotel & Casino in January 2012.

=== The Atlantic Club (2012–2014) ===
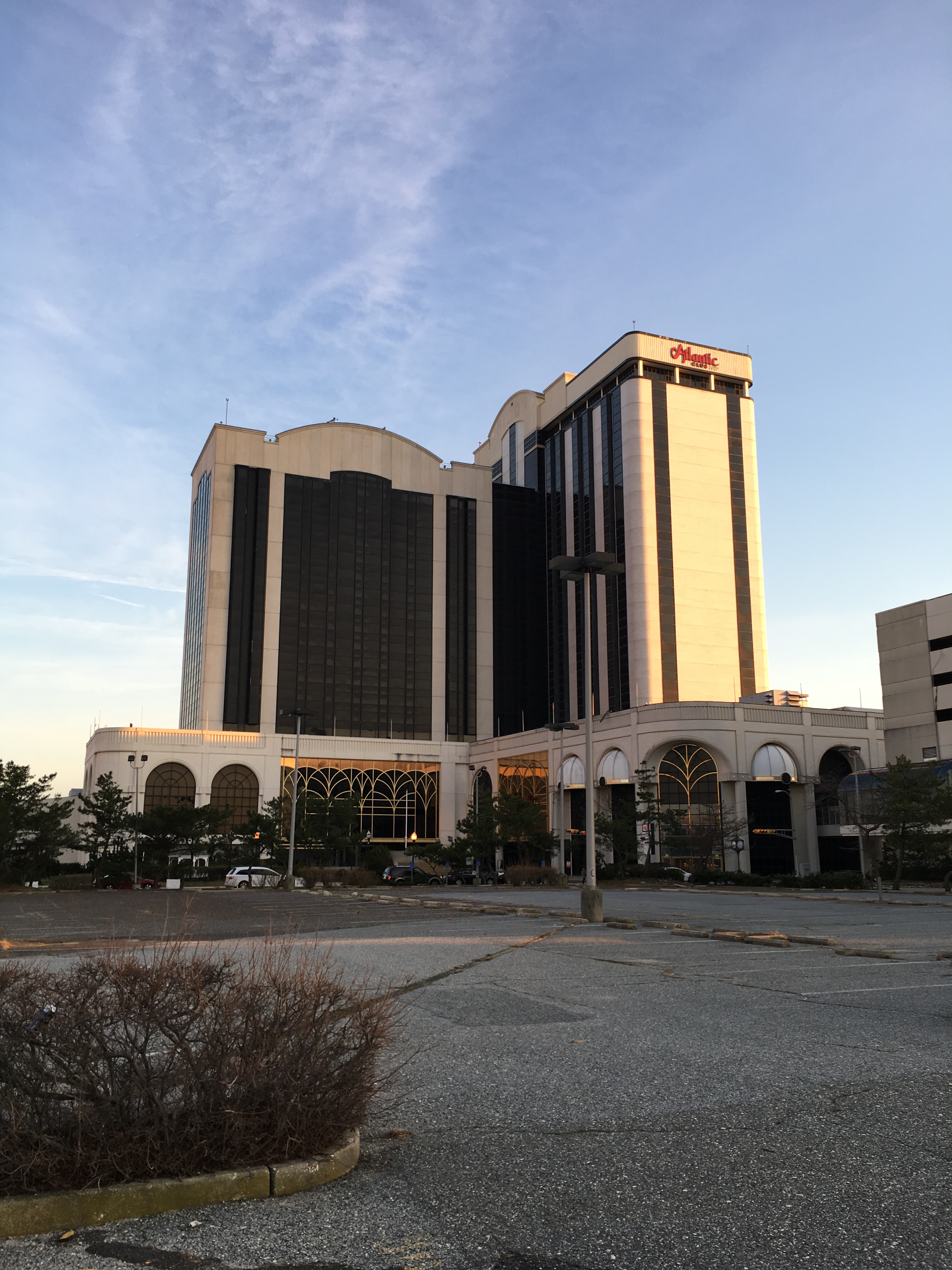
Exterior of the closed Atlantic Club, 2016

On February 7, 2012, the casino became a locals casino and re-branded as The Atlantic Club Casino Hotel. Renovations to the gaming floor and rooms began immediately in an effort to refresh and update the property. The new slogan also went into effect: "A casino for the rest of us."

In December 2012, the Rational Group, parent company of online gaming site PokerStars, was reported to be in discussions to buy the Atlantic Club for less than $50 million, spurred on by a bill under debate in New Jersey to legalize online gaming operations by casino owners. A purchase agreement was announced in January 2013, but was terminated in April after Rational missed a deadline for securing a temporary gaming license.

On December 20, 2013, it was announced that the Atlantic Club Casino Hotel would close on January 13, 2014. Caesars Entertainment bought the property while Tropicana bought all the slot machines, gaming tables, and player databases in a joint bankruptcy purchase for $23.4 million combined.

On May 29, 2014, Caesars Entertainment sold the Atlantic Club to TJM Properties, a Florida development firm that purchased and reopened the former Claridge Casino Hotel in Atlantic City earlier in the year. The reported Atlantic Club purchase price was $13.5 million. The firm planned to either reopen it as a non-gaming property, such as a hotel, or sell it.

=== Future ===
In 2015, redevelopment plans for the shuttered resort were proposed by Pennsylvania-based Endeavor Property Group, calling for a renovation of the existing buildings into a non-gaming resort featuring two indoor water parks. An 81,000-square-foot indoor water park would be built across the street from the Atlantic Club, on the block bordered by Pacific, Atlantic, Boston and Sovereign avenues, currently a surface parking lot used by the resort, as well as a smaller adult-oriented indoor water park fronting the boardwalk. The former casino space would be renovated convention space and a large arcade. The project was approved by the CRDA in July 2015; the CRDA is also planning a "Gateway Project" adjacent to the site, proposing office and academic redevelopment along Albany Avenue, including the site of the former Atlantic City High School.

In March 2017, R & R Development Group agreed to purchase the property with the intention of converting it to a family entertainment center with a waterpark, but the deal fell through two months later because R & R could not obtain financing.

In September 2018, Stockton University attempted to purchase the property to expand itself. It planned to keep the parking garage, but demolish the main structure. The deal fell through after TJM declined the sale. Later in the year in November 2018, a development group from New York was in talks to buy The Atlantic Club, but a deal never shaped up.

In February 2019, a sale settlement was filed by the property's owner, TJM Properties, however they denied the sale of property.

Most recently, in October 2019, the property was sold to Colosseo Atlantic City, Inc. On October 23, 2019, the owner hired a New Jersey–based broker. In 2022, Colosseo obtained a construction permit to begin recladding the buildings with watertight glass curtain walls, as part of a redevelopment plan for the site to include hotel towers and residential condominiums but no casino.

== Hotel ==
The Atlantic Club boasted 802 hotel rooms, all newly renovated in 2012. Guests at the Atlantic Club could choose from one of the various room styles.

== Casino ==
The casino at the Atlantic Club featured a standard set of table games, slots, and video machines. Patrons could sign up for the Player's Club, which was the rewards program at the Atlantic Club.

== Dining ==
There were eight restaurants at the Atlantic Club.

=== Restaurants ===
- Simon AC
- Patsy's Trattoria
- Ono Chinese Bistro
- Cappuccino's
- Dizzy Dolphin's Beachfront Bar
- Cornucopia Buffet
- BB'S
- The Coffee Shop

== Shows ==
There were many different shows held at the Atlantic Club, including shows by Bobby Rydell and Rich Little.

== See also ==
- Gambling in New Jersey
- List of tallest buildings in Atlantic City
