= Vera Coking house =

Former building in New Jersey

Coordinates: 39.3554°N 74.4370°W

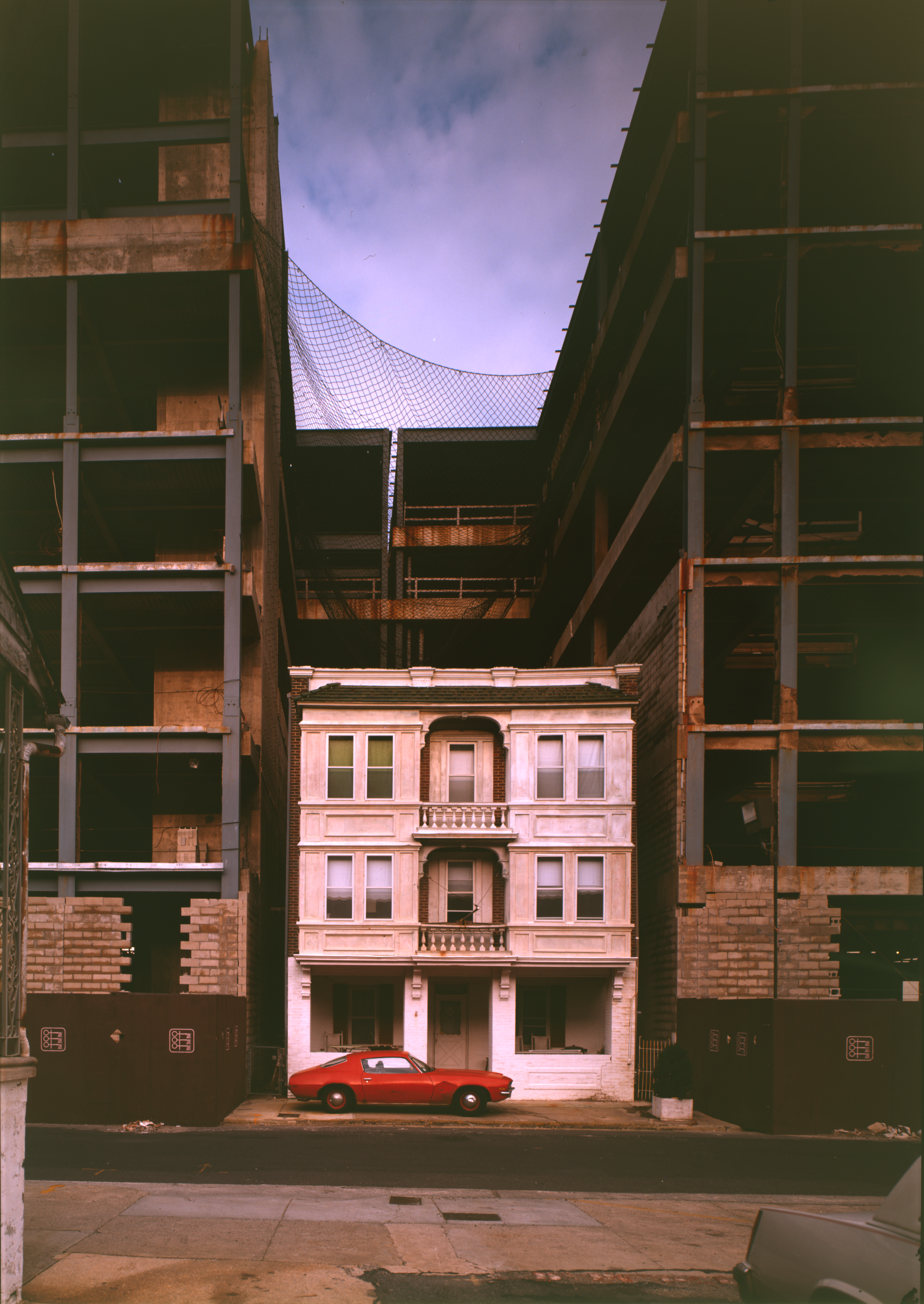
Coking house at 127 S Columbia Pl, between the steel framework of the planned Penthouse Casino; photographed by Jack Boucher for Historic American Buildings Survey, c.1991

The Vera Coking house was a boarding house owned by a retired homeowner in Atlantic City, New Jersey that was the focus of an eminent domain case involving Donald Trump in the 1990s. It was sold and demolished in 2014.

== History ==
In 1961, Vera Coking and her husband bought the property at 127 South Columbia Place as a summertime retreat for $20,000.

In the 1970s, Penthouse magazine publisher Bob Guccione offered Coking $1 million (equivalent to $5 million in 2023) for her property in order to build the Penthouse Boardwalk Hotel and Casino. She declined the offer, and Guccione started construction of the hotel-casino in 1978 around the Coking house, but ran out of money in 1980 and construction stopped. The steel framework structure was finally torn down in 1993.

In 1993, Donald Trump attempted to buy Coking's lot and make it part of a planned parking lot for limousines at the Trump Plaza Hotel and Casino. By this point Coking had lived in her house for 32 years and refused to sell. As a result, the city condemned her house using the power of eminent domain. She was offered her $251,250, a quarter of the previous offer from Guccione. For the next five years, Coking fought the local authorities along with the Institute for Justice and two other holdouts, a pawn shop and a family-owned Italian restaurant. Trump commented that Coking's house, which was wedged between the Trump Plaza Hotel and Caesar's Palace, was ugly.

In 1998, Superior Court Judge Richard Williams ruled that the condemnation actions served private interests (of Trump) rather than the public interest, and that Coking's property did not meet the test of law. Williams' ruling did not reject the practice of using eminent domain to take private property from one individual and transferring it to another, which was eventually upheld by the Supreme Court of the United States in Kelo v. City of New London.

Two other properties that prevailed against eminent domain eventually did sell: Sabatini's restaurant received $2.1 million and a pawnshop sold for $1.6 million. Their lots became part of a large lawn flanking a taxi stand for Trump's casino. Coking remained in her house until 2010, when she moved to a retirement home in the San Francisco Bay Area near her daughter and grandchildren.

Property records show that on June 2, 2010, Coking transferred ownership of the house to her daughter, who put it on the market in 2011 with an initial asking price of $5 million. By September 2013, the price had been reduced to $1 million.

The property was sold for $583,000 in an auction on July 31, 2014. The buyer was Carl Icahn, who held the debt on Trump Entertainment, owner of Trump Plaza. He subsequently demolished the house on November 19, 2014. Neither the Casino Reinvestment Development Authority nor the owners of Trump Plaza expressed any interest in the auction.

The Trump Plaza Hotel and Casino closed in September 2014 for lack of business and was demolished on February 17, 2021.

== See also ==
- Other real-estate holdouts:
  - Edith Macefield, Seattle
  - Figo House, Oregon
  - Michael Forbes, Scotland
  - Wu Ping, southwest China
- Eminent domain
- Kelo v. City of New London
- Up (2009 film)
- Holdout (architecture)
- Little Pink House
