= Figo House =

House in Portland, Oregon, U.S.

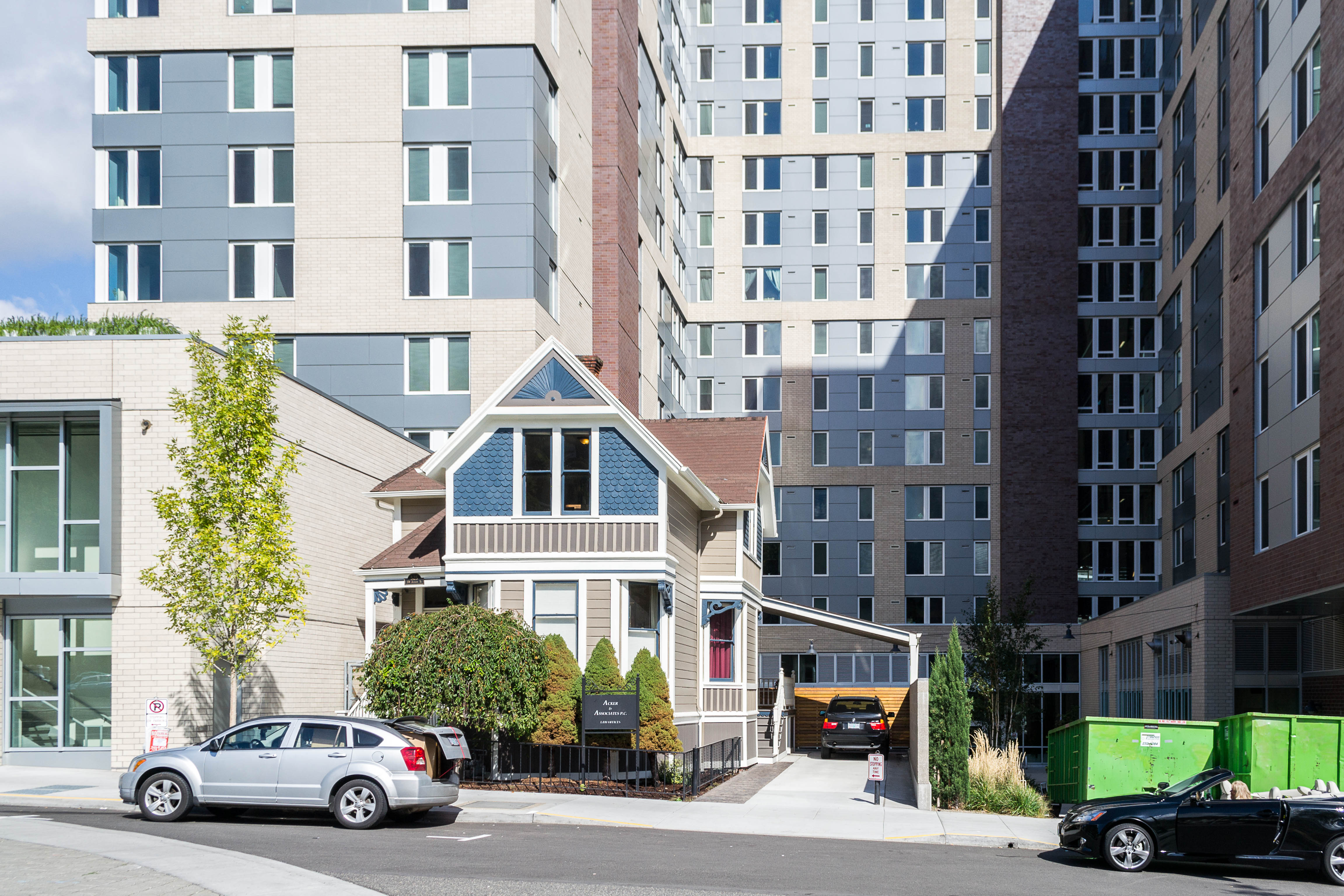
- Portland State University student housing rises behind Figo House
- Interactive map of Figo House

General information
- Architectural style: Queen Anne
- Location: Portland, Oregon
- Coordinates: 45°30′33″N 122°41′01″W
- Completed: 1894

Figo House is a Queen Anne style house in Portland, Oregon, USA. Randal Acker purchased it in 2005 as an office space for his small legal practice. Acker named the house after his dog, Figo, who was named after the former Portuguese soccer star Luís Figo.

The two-story house was built in 1894 in Queen Anne style architecture, and is located at the southern area of downtown Portland near Portland State University.

In 2006, Portland's mass transit authority, TriMet, attempted to acquire the house through condemnation and then sell the property to the university for use as high-rise student housing. The TriMet plan was cancelled in 2008 after Acker successfully argued that eminent domain power is limited.

Portland State University bought the property all around Acker's house. In 2011, Acker likened his situation to that featured in the Disney movie, Up. Later that year, he arranged a Portland screening of the documentary film, Battle for Brooklyn, about Brooklyn, New York, residents fighting to save their homes from real estate developers.

== See also ==
- Edith Macefield
- Nail house
- Vera Coking
- Wu Ping
- Michael Forbes (farmer)
