= POBA (disambiguation) =

POBA is a non-profit, online arts community.

POBA may also refer to:

- Professional Oversight Board for Accountancy, a former regulatory body of the UK Financial Reporting Council
- Plain old balloon angioplasty, where the lumen stenosis of an artery has been treated by balloon dilatation only, without applying a stent
