= Edith Macefield =

American real-estate holdout (1921–2008)

- Born: Doris Edith Wilson; August 21, 1921; North Bend, Oregon, U.S.
- Died: June 15, 2008 (aged 86); Seattle, Washington, U.S.
- Known for: Real-estate holdout

Edith Macefield (August 21, 1921 – June 15, 2008) was an American real estate holdout who received worldwide attention in 2006 when she turned down an offer of $1 million to sell her house to make way for a commercial development in the Ballard neighborhood of Seattle, Washington (originally reported as a package worth $750,000). Instead, the five-story project was built surrounding her 108-year-old farmhouse, where she died at age 86 in 2008. In the process, she became something of a folk hero.

After she died, Macefield willed her house to the new building's construction superintendent, Barry Martin, in gratitude for his friendship and caretaker role. Martin told the Seattle Post-Intelligencer, "Two or three times she was basically going to sell and move, and then I know the last time she ended up falling and breaking some ribs, and that kind of took the gas out of her, and then it was just too much work."

== Early life ==
Macefield was born in Oregon in 1921 and learned French, German, and other languages. She joined the military and was sent to England, where she was later taken out of the service after officials discovered she was not 18 years old. Macefield stayed in England where she took care of war orphans, and later moved back home, where she took care of her mother and worked at Washington Dental Service.

She was married four times, all in Europe. (Note: Her marriages were to Richard Tauber (Austrian), James Philip Denton (English), Leonardo Simon Genn (Welsh), and Gretoui [sic?] Anatoli Domilini (Italian, died 1984).) She outlived her last three husbands and her only child (a son who died at 13 from spinal meningitis) by decades.

== House ==
1438 Northwest 46th Street
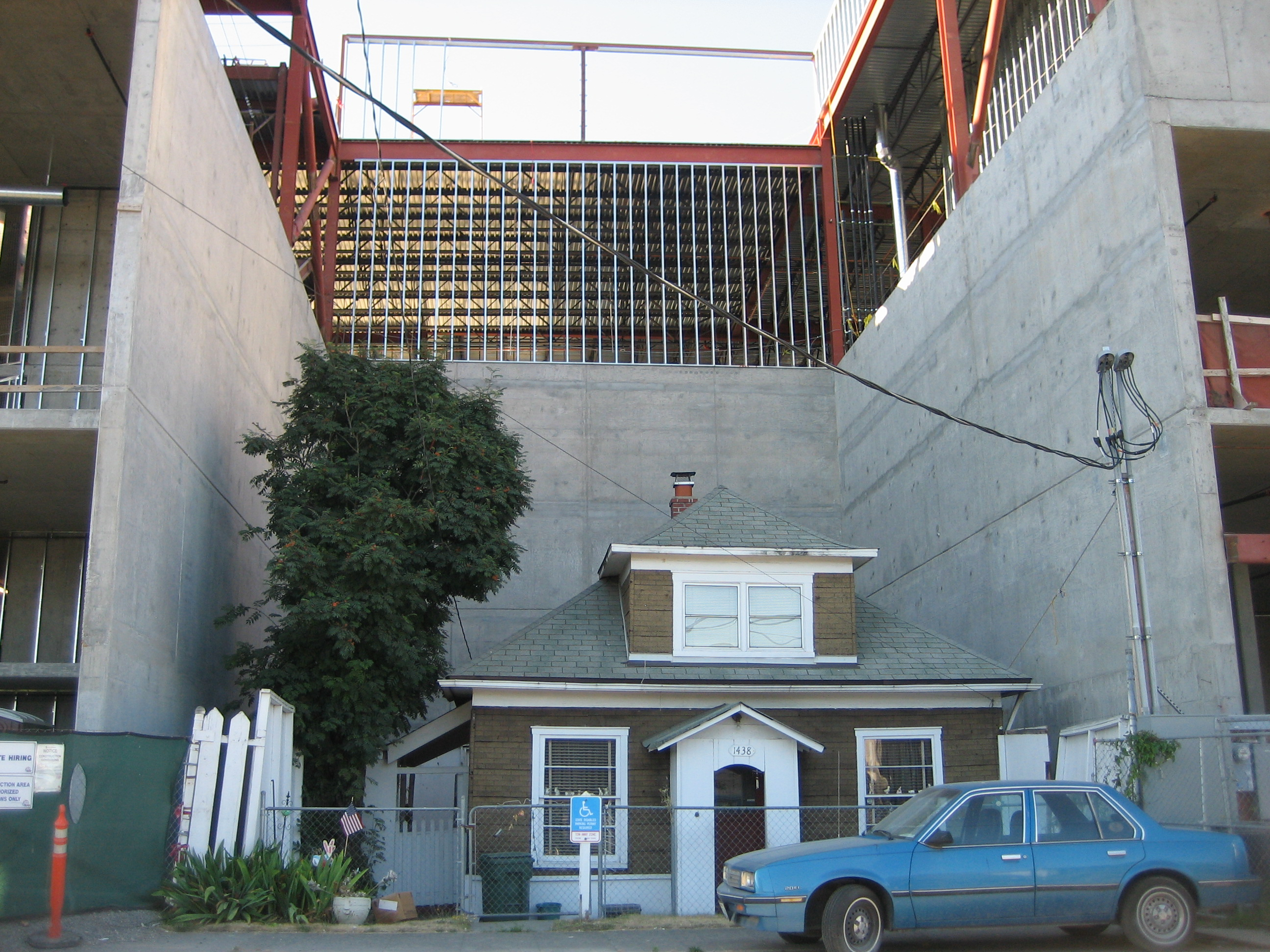
- Macefield's house amid construction
- Interactive map of the 1438 Northwest 46th Street area

General information
- Location: Seattle, Washington, U.S.
- Coordinates: 47.662316°N 122.375358°W
- Completed: 1900
- Owner: Edith Macefield (until 2008); Barry Martin (from 2008)

Technical details
- Floor area: 1,050 square feet (98 m^{2})

Other information
- Number of rooms: 4 (attic, bathroom + 2 bedrooms)

Macefield turned down a reported $1 million offer to sell her home in 2006 to make way for a commercial development in the Ballard neighborhood of Seattle. In the process, she became something of a folk hero. Instead, the five-story project was built surrounding her 108-year-old farmhouse, where she died at age 86 from pancreatic cancer. The house is located at 1438 NW 46th St.

== Legacy ==
As she intended, she died at her family home. She was buried in Evergreen Washelli Cemetery, Seattle, beside her mother, who had died in 1976 on the same couch as she did. On May 26, 2009, Disney publicists attached balloons to the roof of Macefield's house, as a promotional tie-in to their film, Up, in which an aging widower's home is similarly surrounded by looming development. However, scriptwriting and production on Up began in 2004, two years before Macefield's refusal to sell to the property developers.

In July 2009, Barry Martin sold the house to real estate investor Greg Pinneo for $310,000. Pinneo intended to use the house as an office to run his real estate coaching firm Reach Returns. However, on March 13, 2015, the house went through foreclosure auction and was subsequently put back on the market. Pinneo had failed to pay back taxes on the house.

The inaugural Macefield Music Festival was held October 5, 2013, in Ballard. The event included multiple musical genres, in several venues. The promoters said it "will be an affordable way to explore the current landscape of Seattle music while celebrating the steadfast attitude of the dearly departed Ms. Macefield."

A 99% Invisible podcast titled "Holdout" (#130) discussed the story of Macefield.

BBC Radio 4 broadcast a play, The Macefield Plot written by Daniel Thurman, on May 14, 2019, (repeated in June 2021). Directed by David Hunter, it starred Siân Phillips as Macefield and Stanley Townsend as Barry Martin.

== See also ==
- Other real-estate holdouts:
  - Vera Coking, Atlantic City, New Jersey
  - Thirsty Beaver, North Carolina
  - Figo House, Oregon
  - Michael Forbes, Scotland
  - Wu Ping, southwest China
- Eminent domain
- Kelo v. City of New London
- 154 W Superior St, Chicago, IL 60654
