= Holdout (real estate) =

Property not sold for real estate development

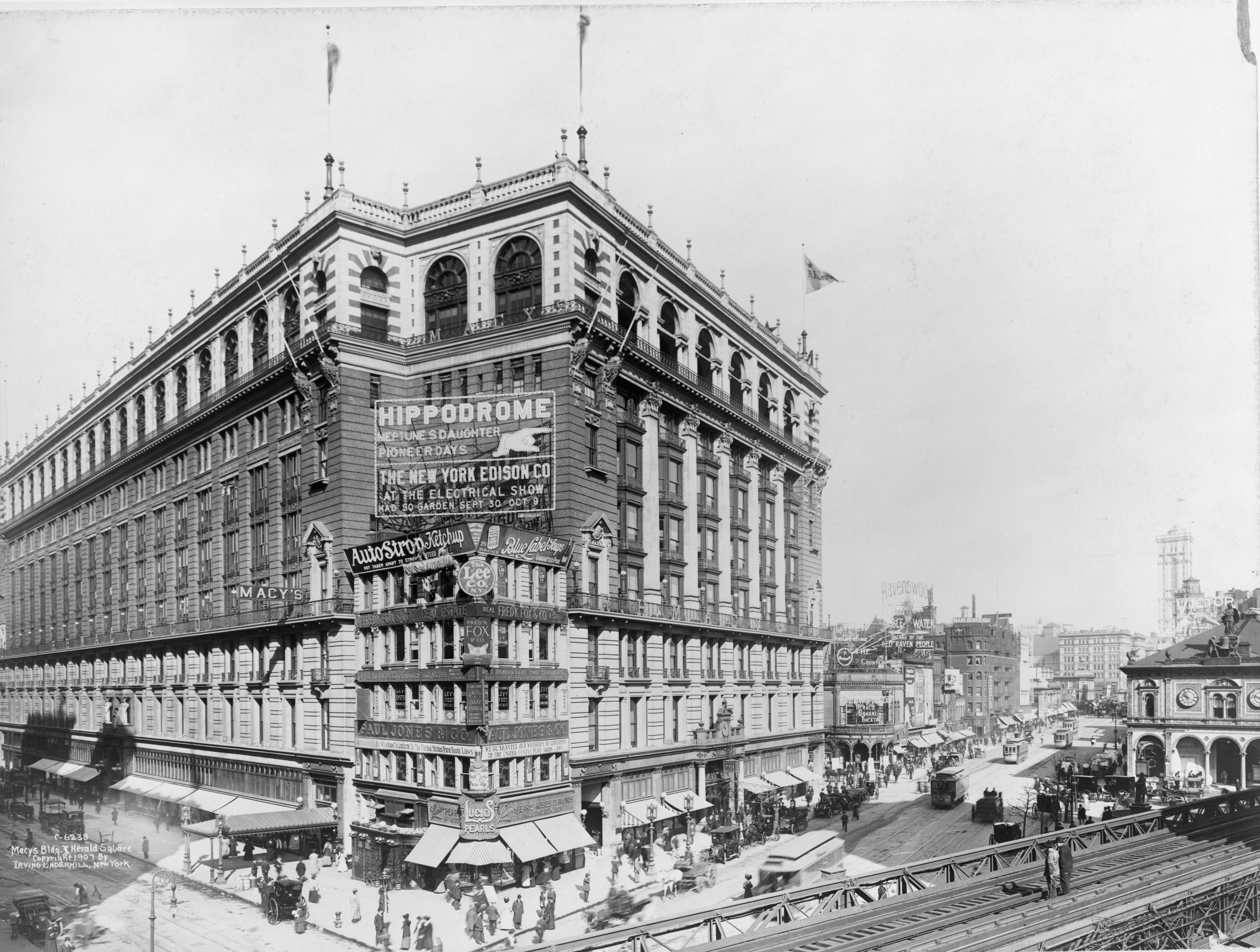
Million Dollar Corner, a holdout at the corner of Macy's Herald Square in New York City

A holdout is a property that did not become part of a larger real estate development, usually because the owner refused to sell their property. There are many examples of holdouts worldwide.

== Examples ==
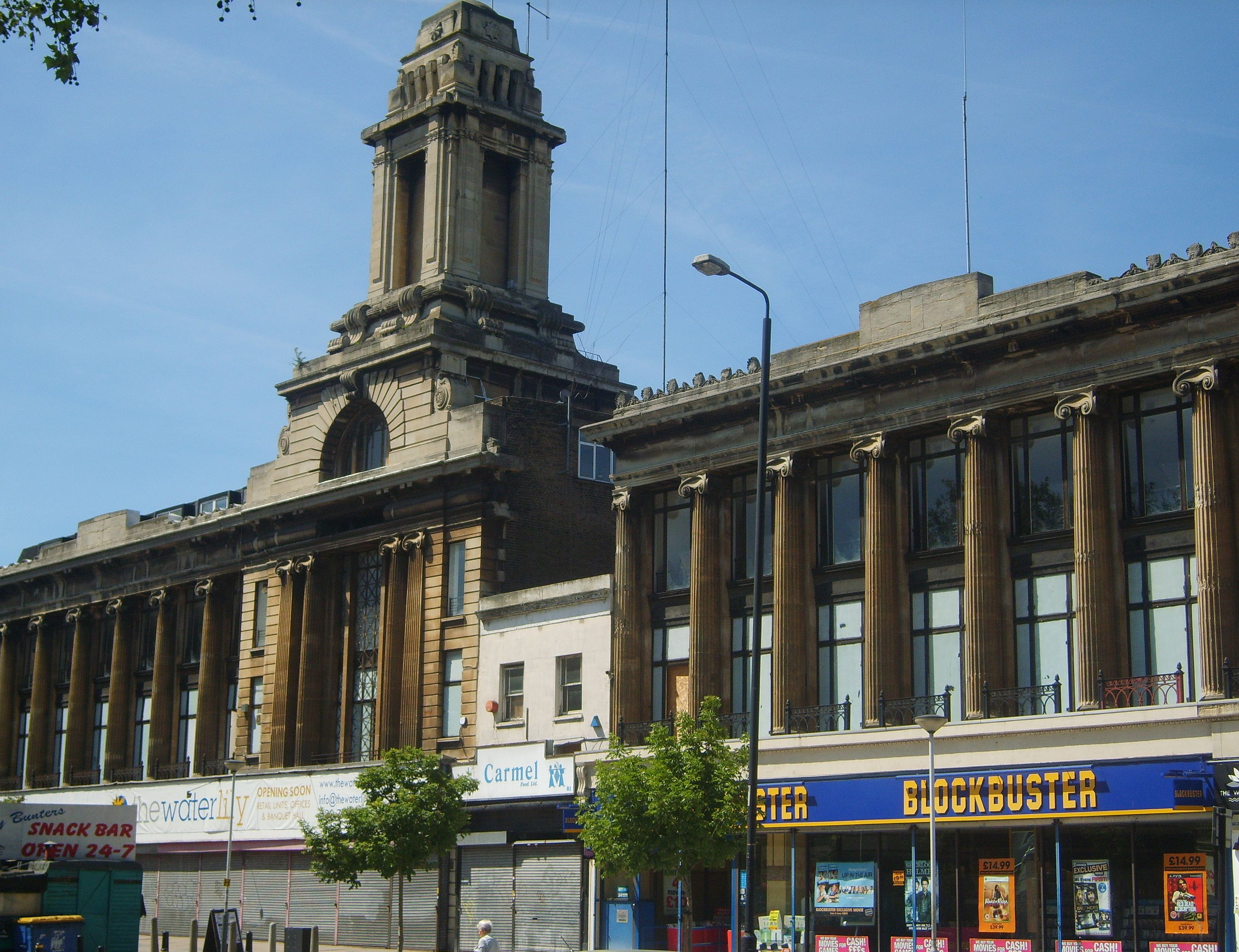
Wickhams Department Store, Mile End Road, Stepney, London, built around the Spiegelhalter jewellers shop (2010)

Macy's headquarters at Macy's Herald Square in New York City, for example, does not cover the whole block because of a holdout named the Million Dollar Corner on the corner of Broadway and West 34th Street (in Herald Square). The building received its name from the fact that it sold for a million dollars in 1911, an unprecedented sum at the time. The building was decorated as a Macy's shopping bag for 60 years; however, the sign was removed in 2026.

One mile (1.6 km) north of Macy's Herald Square is 30 Rockefeller Center, which has slight setbacks at its corners of 49th and 50th Streets on Sixth Avenue due to two buildings at those corners. The owner of 1258 Sixth Avenue—John F. Maxwell, grandson of the original owner—outright refused to sell to John D. Rockefeller Jr. during the construction of Rockefeller Center. While Rockefeller was successful in purchasing the townhouse at 1240 Sixth Avenue, the lessees—Daniel Hurley and Patrick Daly, owners of a speakeasy on 49th Street, who had signed a long-term lease—refused to vacate unless they were bought out to their asking sum of $250 million (equivalent to $5.3 billion in 2025).

In Stepney, in the East End of London, the construction of the department store Wickhams, completed in 1927, on the north side of the Mile End Road was obstructed by the Spiegelhalter brothers who owned and ran a jewellers at no. 81. The store building was completed around the jewellers shop.

In Houston, Texas, the construction of 700 Louisiana Street in the early 1980s encountered a dilemma surrounding a unique holdout. At the construction site bordered by Louisiana, Capitol, Rusk, and Smith Streets, a communications hub for the Western Union Company stood at the corner at Louisiana and Capitol Streets. Due to Western Union's unwillingness to relocate as the rerouting of communication equipment was financially infeasible, developer Hines Interests negotiated with the occupants of the Western Union building for a complete envelopment of the building in a vault within 700 Louisiana Street's modern facade, allowing the facility to resume operation on the site inside the skyscraper's 12-story adjacent bank-lobby structure. Following its later closure, remnants of the Western Union building were redeveloped and integrated into 700 Louisiana Street in 2018.

The construction of new runway capacity at Narita International Airport in Japan starting in the 1990s was met with significant local protest; in one example, families refused to move even as the original and subsequent runway construction projects began around them.

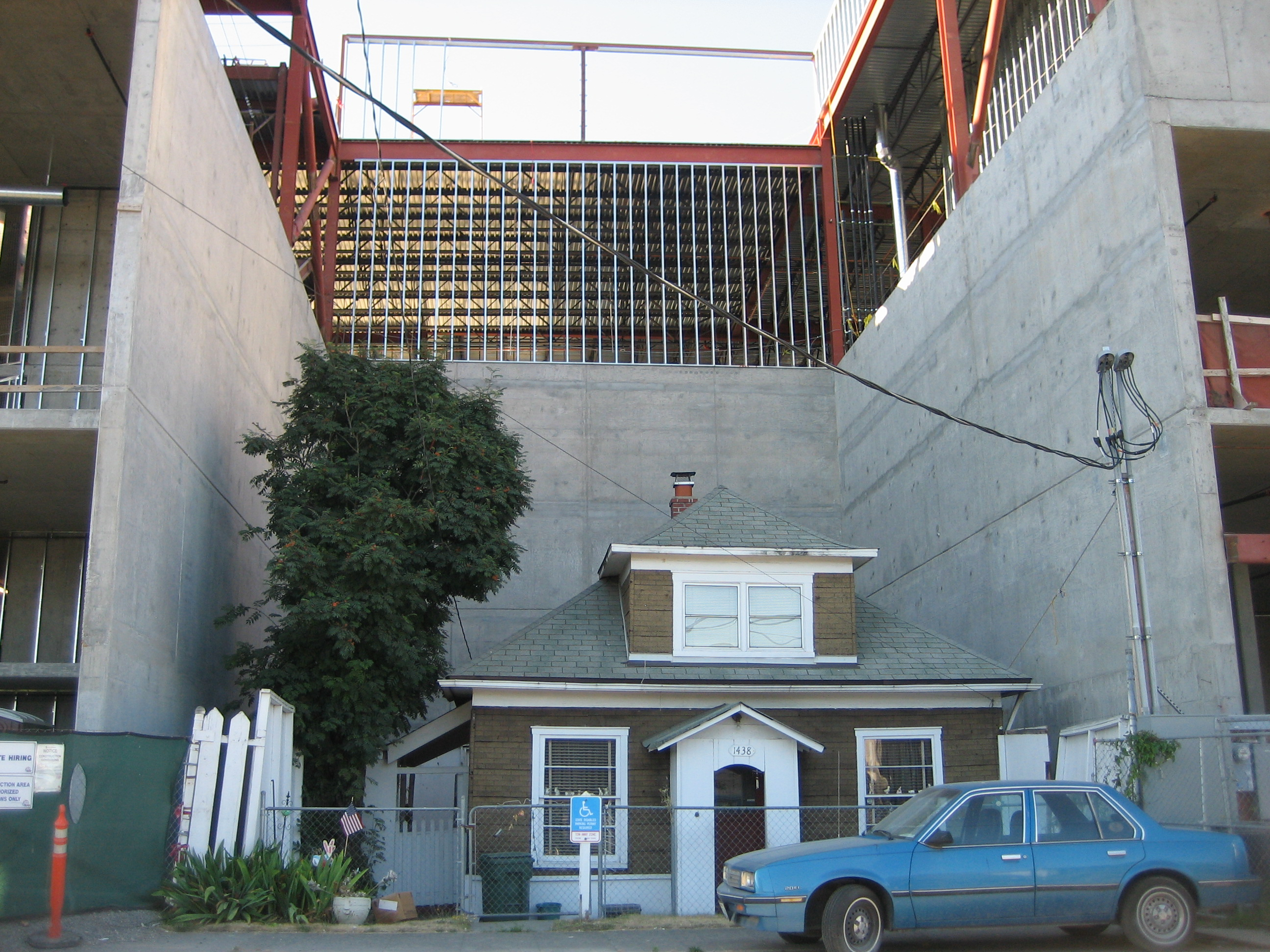
Edith Macefield's home amid construction (2008)

Edith Macefield of Seattle, Washington, received attention from media all over the world in 2006 when she refused an offer of $750,000, and then another that increased to a package of $1 million, assistance in finding a similar home in another location, and complimentary home care for the remainder of her senior years from developers of a shopping mall development that was planned to comprise the entire block of her Ballard neighborhood home. After several failures of negotiation with Ms. Macefield, builders opted to continue with construction, surrounding 3 sides of her property with 5-story concrete walls. She became coined a folk hero by the press for taking a stand against big-time developers and refusing an offer most would take. However, contrary to popular belief, she was not against development around her property; her reason for holding out was simply that she found the process of moving uncomfortable at her increasingly debilitating age. She died in 2008 at the age of 86 in her home per her wishes, and the house still stands today empty and surrounded by concrete walls and urban sprawl.

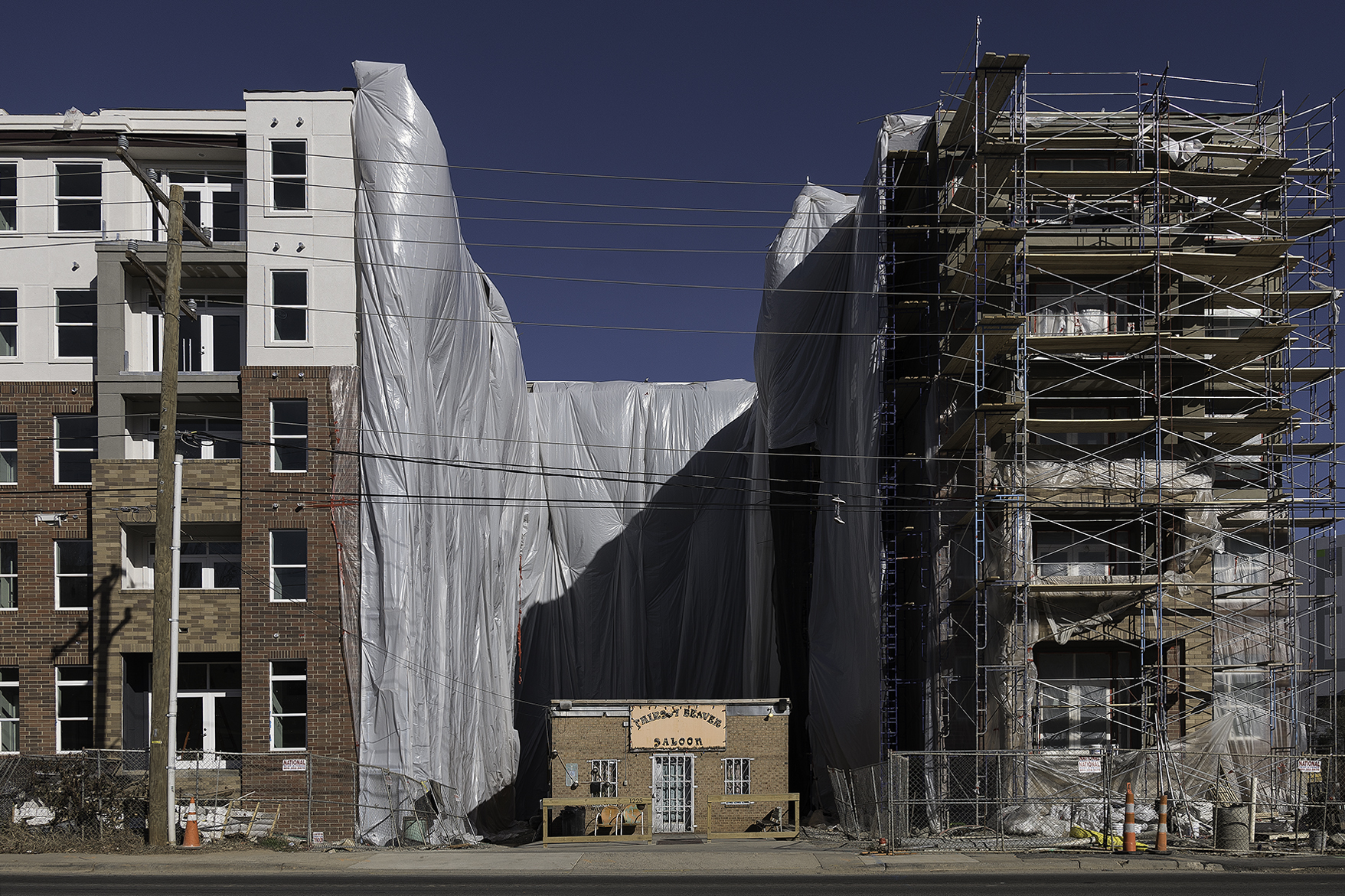
The Thirsty Beaver in Charlotte, North Carolina (2018)

The Thirsty Beaver is a bar which is surrounded by an apartment complex, in Charlotte, North Carolina, United States. The establishment was started in a one-story building by two brothers in 2008. When established, the property was surrounded by vacant lots but in 2015, a development company purchased all of the land surrounding the bar. When the owners of the bar's land and building refused two offers to purchase from a developer, the development company built apartments in a horseshoe shape around the bar.

== Property law ==
In the United States, private property is protected by the Fifth Amendment to the Constitution from seizure by the government without "just compensation". Under the concept of eminent domain, local and national government agencies are entitled to take private property for purposes in the public interest, but must offer owners compensation amounting to the value of the property. Private companies, most often railroads, could be granted the power of eminent domain through a company charter enacted by state legislators. The United Kingdom, New Zealand, and the Republic of Ireland have a comparable process called compulsory purchase, and there are equivalent laws in Australia and South Africa. In Kelo v. City of New London (2005), the United States Supreme Court held that the government is entitled to take land from private parties for any reason, including to give to private developers, with the justification that the development's greater assessed value, and resulting increase in property tax revenue, fulfilled the "public interest" requirement. The decision was widely unpopular, and spurred various states to enact laws prohibiting the practice, restricting eminent domain seizures to public works projects. However, the practice is common in other states. The efforts generally begin with an offer by the private group or government agency to purchase the land, and only become a question of eminent domain if the parties cannot negotiate a purchase price.

When eminent domain seizures do occur there are often disputes over the value of the property, and whether it should fully compensate the landowner for the holdout value of the land. A historical example of a San Francisco nail house (see below) resulted in railroad investor Charles Crocker building a spite fence around a house owned by undertaker Nicolas Yung in the late 1870s, after Yung refused to sell his small property to Crocker, who was consolidating lots on which to build a mansion. More recent examples include Edith Macefield, who refused to sell her Seattle house to a developer, and Randal Acker who challenged the power of eminent domain in Portland, Oregon.

The People's Republic of China passed its first modern private property law in March 2007 amid the property development bubble.

== Nail house ==
Nail house
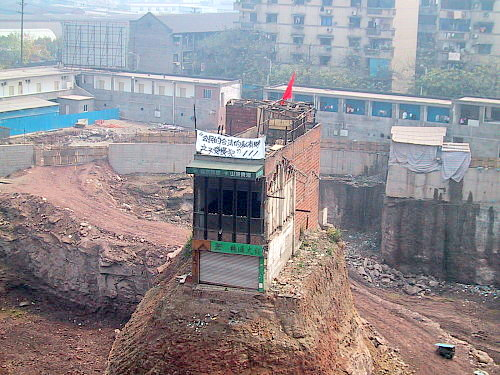
- Nail house in Chongqing of Wu Ping
- Traditional Chinese: 釘子戶
- Simplified Chinese: 钉子户
Transcriptions
Standard Mandarin
- Hanyu Pinyin: dīngzihù

Nail house is a calque of a Chinese neologism "dīngzihù" (literally, "nail household or householder") that refers to either a person who refuses to vacate their home to make way for development, or the home itself. The Chinese term, coined by developers, comes from the fact that these houses stick out like a nail that can be neither extracted nor hammered down.

=== Historical background ===
In the People's Republic of China (PRC), during most of the Communist era, private ownership of real property was abolished. The central government officially owned all real estate, and could in theory dictate who was entitled to control any piece of property according to national interests. Private citizens, therefore, did not have a legal right to keep their property if the government decided they should leave (although in practice, entitlements arose for various reasons). With a strengthening economy and the rise of free markets beginning in the late 1990s, private developers began building shopping malls, hotels, and other private developments in densely populated urban centers, which required displacing residents who lived on the land. Developers would typically offer relatively low compensation to the residents, reflecting the pre-development value of their properties or the cost of obtaining alternative housing elsewhere. Should residents resist, or try to take advantage of their bargaining position, powerful developers could persuade local officials and courts to order residents off the land. In other cases, residents would be arrested on false charges or thugs would be hired to scare away the residents.

More recently, in 2007 the PRC has begun to accept private ownership of real estate, including the still-controversial notion that owners are free to earn money when their land becomes more valuable due to planned developments, or even simply not to sell. Discontent arose among the people over accusations of illegal land seizures by developers and corruption by complicit government officials.

In March 2007, China passed its first modern private property law. The law prohibits government taking of land, except when it is in the public interest. The law strengthened the position of nail house owners, but did not entirely resolve whether making room for private commercial developments was a public interest that entitled the taking of land.

=== Examples ===
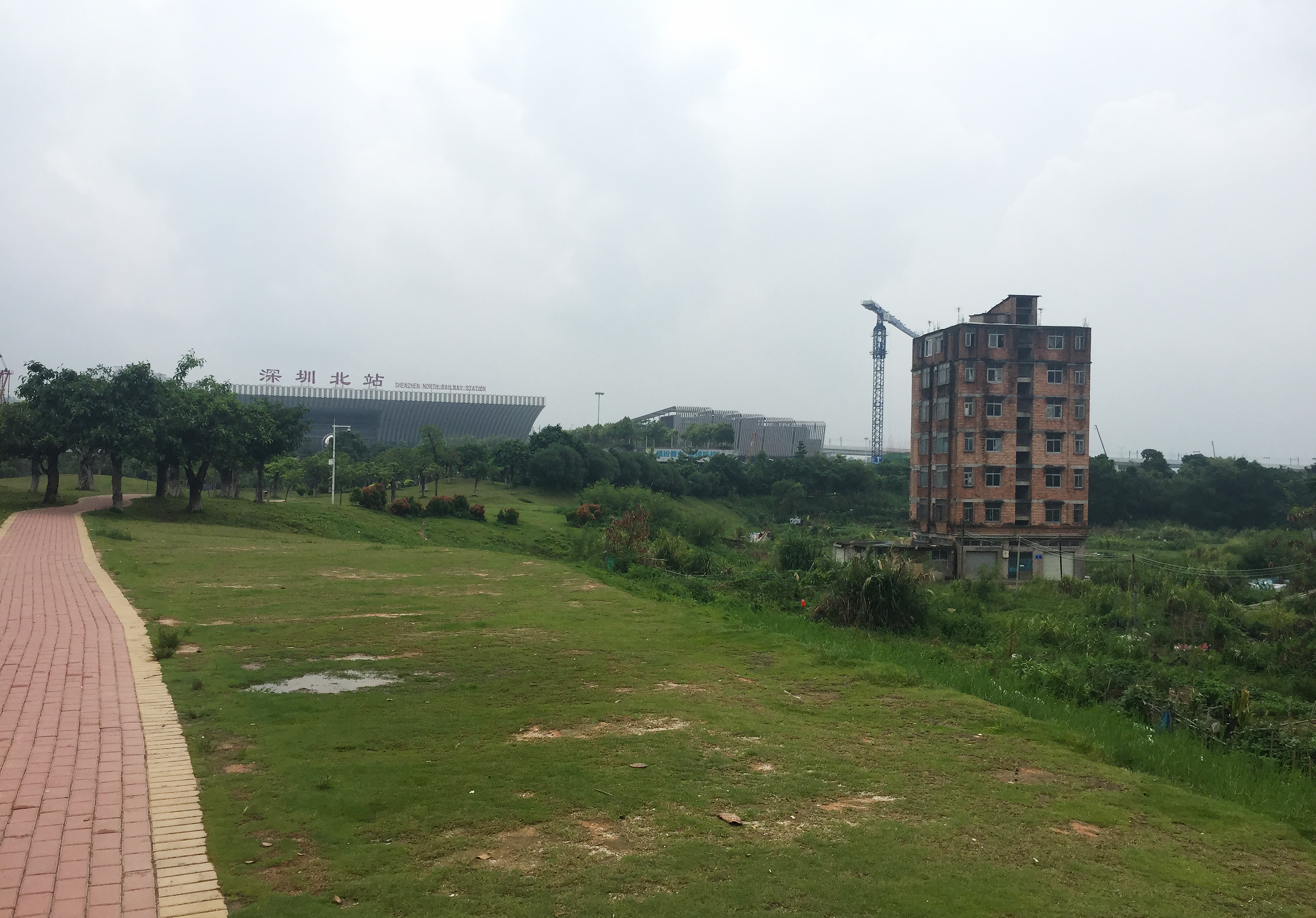
A holdout near Shenzhen North railway station in 2016

A number of high-profile nail houses have received widespread attention in the Chinese press. In one case in 2007, one family among 280 others at the location of a six-story shopping mall under construction at the location of a former "snack street" in Chongqing refused for two years to vacate a home their family had inhabited for three generations. Developers cut their power and water, and excavated a 10-metre-wide (33 ft) pit around their home. The owners broke into the construction site, reoccupied it, and flew a Chinese flag on top. Yang Wu, a local martial arts champion, used nunchakus to make a staircase to their house, and threatened to beat any authorities who attempted to evict him. His wife, a restaurateur named Wu Ping who had planned to open a restaurant in the home's ground floor, granted interviews and frequent press releases to generate publicity. The owners turned down an offer of 3.5 million yuan (US$453,000), but eventually settled with the developers in 2007.

In another example, a nail house remained in Changsha, even after a shopping mall was built around it, and now sits in a courtyard of the mall. One owner in Shenzhen was paid between 10 and 20 million yuan (US$1.3 million to $2.7 million) for selling a seven-story building at the site of the future 439-meter (1,440-foot) Kingkey Finance Tower, that had cost him 1 million yuan ($130,000) to build ten years before. The resident held out for months following an eviction order, and was subject to harassment and extortion attempts even after he reached a settlement. Two other nail house owners held out against the Kingkey development.

Another nail house became notable after it ended up in the middle of a new road in Wenling, Zhejiang. The elderly couple had refused to sell the property for the price offered by the government since 2001. Eventually a major two-lane road to a new train station was constructed around the house. Pictures of the home went viral on the Internet and were widely published by Chinese media. The property was demolished in December 2012 after the owners accepted a compensation offer worth $41,000.

The case of Guizhou citizen, 43-year-old Chen Tianming's 10-storey house akin to a pagoda made the news in 2025. As a response to the threat of expropriation by the local government, Chen continued to build upwards to fight for just compensation. The rickety wooden structure, which is held up in part by guy lines, has been compared to Howl's Moving Castle. Due to its visibility from a great distance, it has been attracting interest from far and wide.

=== Media coverage ===
Nail houses have received an unusual degree of coverage in the Chinese press. The Chongqing incident was initially called "coolest nail house in history" by a blogger, after which the incident was picked up by major media throughout China, including state-run newspapers, and became a national sensation. Eighty-five percent of respondents to a poll on sina.com supported the couple rather than the developers. Later, however, the Chinese government forbade newspapers from reporting on the event. Another blogger, vegetable vendor Zhou Shuguang, traveled by train from his home in Hunan to cover the incident, funded by donations from his readers. Writing under the pen name "Zuola", Zhou interviewed the participants, as well as crowds that had gathered and others who claimed to have been evicted from their homes. He was popularly referred to as China's first "citizen journalist" although his site was blocked as well. Others defied the prohibition as well, including the Chinese edition of Sports Illustrated, which worked a subtle reference of the incident into a magazine cover.

== In popular culture ==
- In The Hitchhiker's Guide to the Galaxy, Arthur Dent resists the demolition of his home to make way for a bypass. This defiance is later mirrored on a cosmic scale when the entire Earth faces destruction for an intergalactic highway.
- Shrek follows the quest of an ogre as he fights to keep his swamp from being occupied by Fairy Tale creatures displaced by Lord Farquaad. Through Shrek's journey, the swamp he calls home becomes a symbol of resilience against societal pressures, illustrating that true happiness lies in embracing one's unique identity.
- In The Emperor's New Groove, Pacha refuses to give up his family's home despite the emperor's plans to build a palace on it.
- In The Goonies, a group of neighborhood kids gather for one last weekend together in the face of foreclosure on their homes in the "Goon Docks" area of Astoria, Oregon. Their tranquil, historic homes are to be replaced with a country club. While rummaging through Mickey's attic, they find an old treasure map. Seeing it as an opportunity to save their homes, they seek it out. Evading a local crime family and numerous booby traps, they find the treasure, thwarting the developers.
- In the music video for Dido's Thank you, a small home is depicted surrounded by sky scrapers and hungry developers. Having drunk in excess the night prior and with bills to pay, the singer misses work and is evicted from her home. A phone call from her love makes things not so bad.
- In early 2010 the China Film Group Corporation, China's state-run film distributor, withdrew the film Avatar from screens early. Many commentators in China drew connections between nail house evictions and depictions in the film of forced relocation of indigenous populations by a large company. The Los Angeles Times reported that the decision was due to concerns that the film would trigger dissent over the country's nail house phenomenon.
- An online flash game developed by Mirage Games, The Big Battle: Nail House Versus Demolition Team, became popular in China in 2010.
- The fifth season of Better Call Saul features a real estate holdout who refuses to sell his property to Mesa Verde Bank, forcing Kim Wexler to try to mediate between the two parties.
- The Disney Channel series Big City Greens revolves around the country family cast moving to their grandmother's holdout house in a large city. The series' second season revolves around a developer trying to demolish the house to build a car park.
- In the 2009 Disney-Pixar film Up, Carl holds out against an aggressive redevelopment plan on his block, eventually using hundreds of balloons to lift his home up and away from the lot rather than being forced into an assisted living facility.

== See also ==
- Mary Ellis grave
- Michael Forbes (farmer)
- Narita International Airport (Sanrizuka Struggle)
- Real estate in China
- Spite house
- St. Joseph Catholic Church (San Antonio, Texas)
- Vera Coking
- Ransom strip
