= Million Dollar Corner =

Building in Manhattan, New York

Coordinates: 40°45′0.55″N 73°59′17.3″W

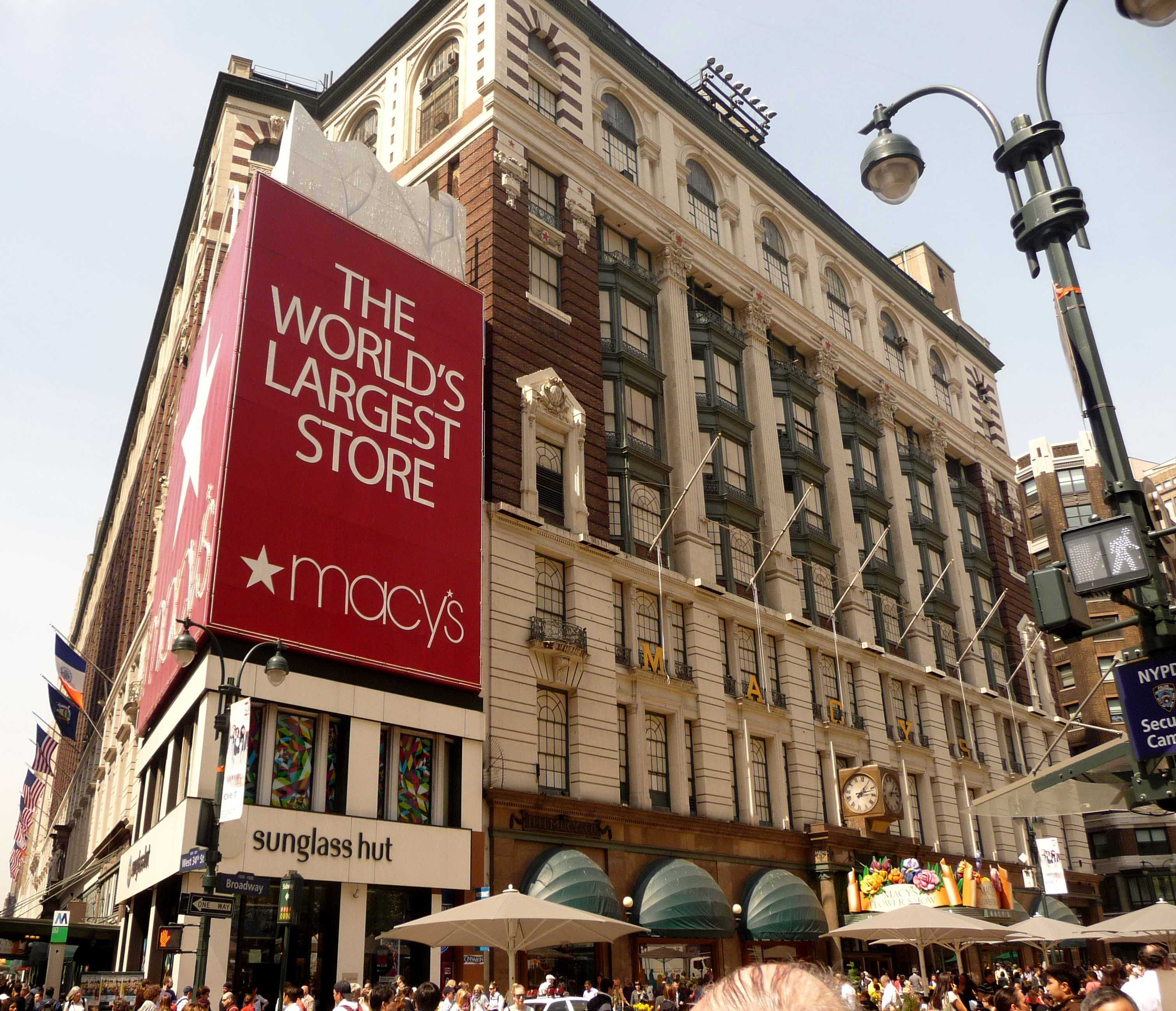
The building, upper floors covered with Macy's billboard, in 2010.

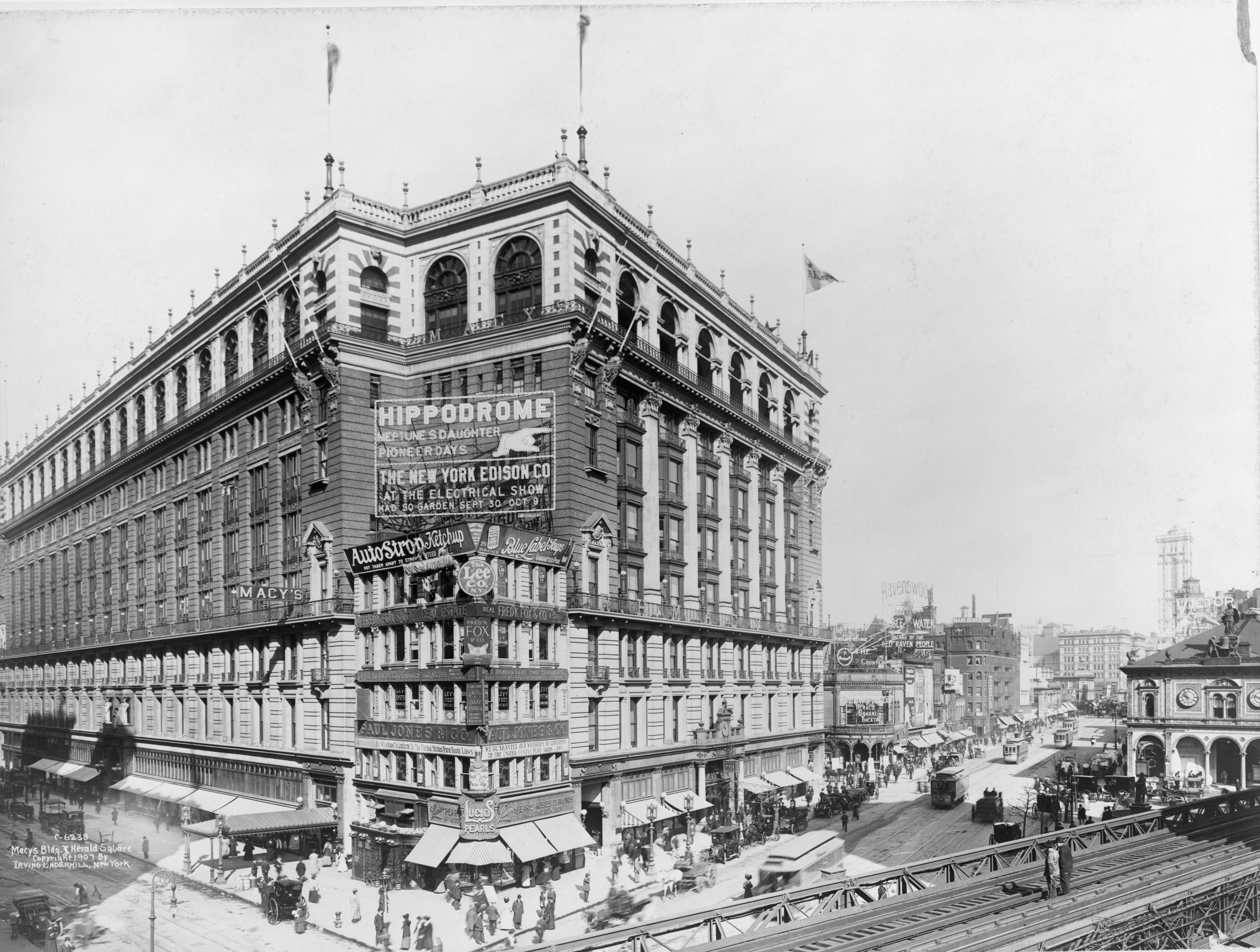
The building, fully visible, in 1907.

The Million Dollar Corner is a small building next to Macy's Herald Square at 1313 Broadway, at the corner with 34th Street, in Herald Square, Manhattan, New York City. On December 6, 1911, the five-story building sold for a then-record $1 million (equivalent to $34.6 million in 2025).

== History ==
The building had been purchased by Robert H. Smith in 1900 for $375,000 (equivalent to $14.5 million in 2025). The idea had been to keep Macy's, which had announced plans to start construction on the block in 1901, from becoming the largest store in the world. It is largely supposed that Smith, who was a neighbor of the Macy's store on 14th Street, was acting on behalf of Siegel-Cooper, which had built what they thought was the world's largest store on Sixth Avenue in 1896. Macy's ignored the tactic and built around the building, but later struck a deal whereby the building began to carry a large Macy's billboard, generally a "shopping bag" sign (proclaiming Macy's the "world's largest store"), by lease arrangement.

=== 2021 disagreement ===
In September 2021, Macy's accused the billboard's owner Kaufman Realty of negotiating to lease the space to an online retailer before Macy's most recent lease expired that August. Macy's claimed that the lessee was almost certainly Amazon and filed for an injunction preventing Kaufman from leasing the space to a competitor. Macy's claimed that a 1963 agreement prohibited such a lease "forever" and that an Amazon billboard would be highly visible during the Macy's Thanksgiving Day Parade. Kaufman denied that he had communicated with Amazon but did not otherwise dispute the claim it was trying to lease the space to a Macy's competitor. The building's billboard was dismantled in 2026.

== See also ==
- Holdout (real estate)
