= Penthouse Boardwalk Hotel and Casino =

Proposed casino hotel in New Jersey, US

- Interactive map of Penthouse Boardwalk Hotel and Casino
- Location: Atlantic City, New Jersey; 39.35496°N 74.43645°W
- Opened: Never
- Casino type: Land-based

The Penthouse Boardwalk Hotel and Casino was a proposed hotel and casino that was to be built in Atlantic City, New Jersey, between Pacific Ave, South Missouri Ave, Columbia Place and Boardwalk, during the late 1970s. Due to financial and legal difficulties, the hotel was never completed and a casino license was never issued.

== History ==
The hotel-casino was to be built by Boardwalk Properties, Inc., a wholly owned subsidiary of Penthouse International, Inc., the publisher of Penthouse magazine. Initial construction of the project began in 1978, but was halted in 1980 due to financing problems and gaming licensing difficulties. Owner Bob Guccione had made some wildly optimistic predictions in a 1978 interview regarding the casino, saying that a gaming license would be issued in six months, that the casino would open that year, and that another casino (on the site of the Mayflower Hotel) would open the following year.

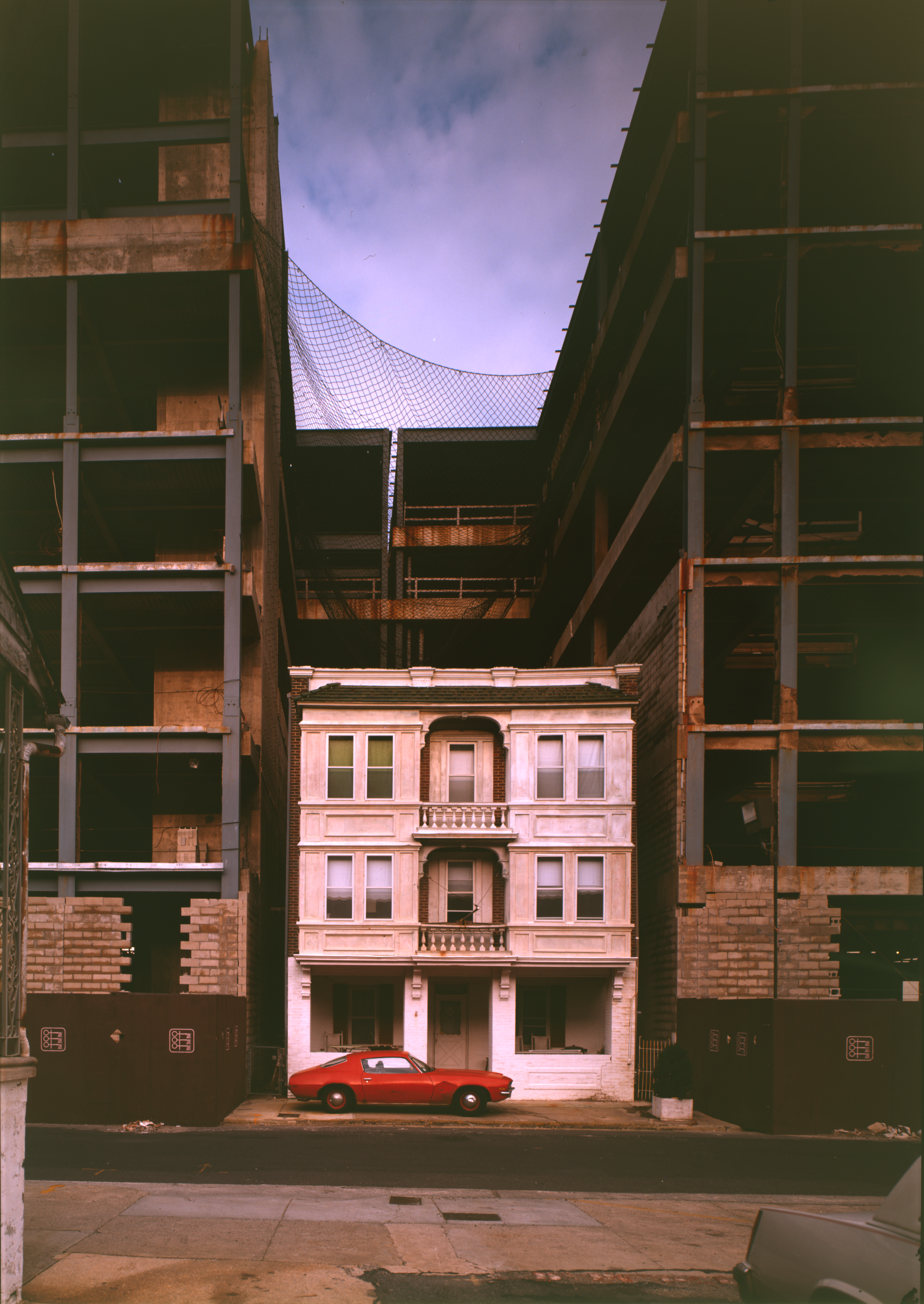
Coking house at 127 S Columbia Pl, between the steel framework of the planned Penthouse Boardwalk Hotel and Casino; photographed by Jack Boucher for Historic American Buildings Survey, c.1991

Penthouse had previously engaged in the casino business, but had not been successful. In 1970, the Penthouse Club in London, England operated a casino. However, the next year the casino license was revoked by the gaming authorities. In 1972, Penthouse opened the Penthouse Adriatic Club casino on the island of Krk in Yugoslavia (now Croatia) at a cost of $45 million. However, the casino filed for bankruptcy the next year and was closed. Guccione had previously tried to purchase the Shelburne Hotel in December 1977, but the owner backed out. In early 1978, Boardwalk Properties purchased the Four Seasons Motel and the Holiday Inn, located in the block bordering the Boardwalk, Pacific Avenue, Missouri Avenue and Columbia Place. It also planned to purchase all the other properties on this block, but it was stymied by one homeowner, Vera Coking, who refused to sell. The company began construction around Coking's house, which was in the middle of the block, but only finished a four-story steel framework structure when the construction stopped. [The film "Atlantic City" features a scene showing the construction of the casino around the Coking house.] The structure languished and rusted for years until Donald Trump acquired the property in 1993. Trump renovated the Holiday Inn building, rebranded it as the Trump Plaza Hotel and Casino East Tower, and demolished the remainder of the structure.

The company's attempts to get a gaming license were protracted. Penthouse International ran a casino in London, England in 1971 that was being investigated by Scotland Yard. The company allegedly allowed non-members and criminal elements to use the casino. The New Jersey Division of Gaming Enforcement also was investigating the purchase of one of the properties (the Mayflower Hotel) from a member of the Philadelphia crime family.

The casino was initially to be financed from box office receipts from Bob Guccione's epic porn movie Caligula. When the movie failed to generate the expected revenues, other financing avenues were sought. During the company's quest for financing, Guccione got involved in the Abscam sting operation when FBI informant Melvin Weinberg tried to get Guccione to pay a bribe. Weinberg told Guccione that an Arab sheikh wanted to invest $150 million in the casino project, but only if the casino had obtained a gaming license. Weinberg wanted Guccione to pay $300,000 to NJ gaming officials to get the license. Guccione responded by saying "Are you out of your mind?" After the Abscam scandal came to light, Guccione sued the federal government, but lost. Penthouse International's search for financing led to other lawsuits. Marjorie Lee Thoreson (a/k/a Anneka diLorenzo), the 1975 Penthouse Pet of the Year, won a $4,060,000 sexual harassment lawsuit against Penthouse and Guccione, claiming among other charges, that she was coerced into providing sexual favors to a furniture manufacturer from Milan who could provide financing for the casino venture. However, on appeal, the punitive damages, representing $4 million of the total verdict, were disallowed. In 1987, Penthouse initially won a lawsuit for $136 million against Dominion Federal Savings & Loan, charging that the thrift backed out of a financing arrangement for the casino that had been agreed on. However, the judgment was overturned the following year. In 1989, Penthouse also sued Pratt Hotel Corp. (owner of the Sands Atlantic City casino) for damages in regard to their failing to complete a deal to acquire the Penthouse property. In a related lawsuit filed by the Sands against Donald Trump, it was alleged that in 1988 the president of Penthouse International threatened to expose Trump's affair with Marla Maples in its magazine unless Trump stopped trying to block the sale of the Penthouse casino property to the Sands.

In 1997, Guccione announced that he was going to develop the Mayflower Hotel property (located between Tennessee Ave, St. James Pl and Boardwalk) into a casino, but nothing became of it.

Guccione later tried to develop a resort in a joint venture with Ramada Inn at a location near the entrance to Atlantic City. That property was sold in 2001 to pay off delinquent loans that he owed. He also sold his remaining Atlantic City property, the Mayflower Hotel site, at the same time
