= Bob Guccione =

American photographer, painter and publisher (1930–2010)

- Born: Robert Charles Joseph Edward Sabatini Guccione; December 17, 1930; New York City, U.S.
- Died: October 20, 2010 (aged 79); Plano, Texas, U.S.
- Occupation: Magazine publisher
- Known for: Founder of Penthouse
- Spouses: Kathy Keeton (m. 1988; died 1997); April Dawn Warren (m. 2006)
- Children: 5, including Bob Jr.

Robert Charles Joseph Edward Sabatini Guccione (/ɡuːtʃiˈoʊni/ goo-chee-OH-nee; (Note: Italian pronunciation goot-CHOH-neh) December 17, 1930 – October 20, 2010) was an American visual artist, photographer and publisher. He founded the adult magazine Penthouse in 1965. This was aimed at competing with Playboy, but with more explicit erotic content, a special style of soft focus photography, and in-depth reporting of government corruption scandals and the art world. By 1982 Guccione was listed in the Forbes 400 wealth list, and owned one of the biggest mansions in Manhattan. However, he made some extravagant investments that failed, and the growth of free online pornography in the 1990s greatly diminished his market. In 2003, Guccione's publishers filed for bankruptcy and he resigned as chairman.

== Early life ==
Guccione was born in Brooklyn, New York, of Italian (Sicilian) descent and raised Catholic in Bergenfield, New Jersey, the eldest child of Anthony, an accountant, and Nina, a housewife. An altar boy, he considered but rejected entering the priesthood. He attended high school at Blair Academy, a prep school in Blairstown, New Jersey.

In his teens, Guccione married his first wife, Lilyann Becker. The couple had a daughter, Tonina (1949–2020). The marriage failed, and he left his wife and child to go to Europe to be a painter. He eventually met an English woman, Muriel Hudson, moved to London with her, and married her. They had four children.

To support his family, Guccione managed a chain of laundromats until he got work as a cartoonist on an American weekly newspaper, The London American, while Muriel started a business selling pinup posters. He occasionally created cartoons for Bill Box's humorous greeting card company Box Cards.

== Career ==
Penthouse began publication in 1965 in the United Kingdom and in North America in 1969, an attempt to compete with Hugh Hefner's Playboy. Although Playboy had always had a liberal bent and championed the civil rights movement and other social justice causes, Guccione offered editorial content that was more sensational, and the magazine's writing was far more investigative than other men's magazines, with stories about government cover-ups and scandals. Writers such as Craig S. Karpel, James Dale Davidson and Ernest Volkman, as well as the critically acclaimed Seymour Hersh, exposed numerous scandals and corruption at the highest levels of the United States government. On the other hand, Playboy retained a certain conservatism and embraced mainstream American consumerism rather than rejecting it. During the late 1960s, feminist groups criticized the magazine for supporting women's liberation only in terms of making them free to engage in sexual relationships with men. While Playboy devoted extensive print to covering sports, one of Hugh Hefner's great passions, Guccione had no interest in them and never bothered discussing sporting events or athletes in Penthouse, instead preferring to cover the art world. The magazine was founded on humble beginnings. Owing to his lack of resources, Guccione personally photographed most of the models for the magazine's early issues.

As the magazine grew more successful, Guccione openly embraced a life of luxury; his former mansion at 14-16 East 67th Street on Manhattan's Upper East Side was said to be the largest private residence in the borough at 22,000 square feet (2,000 m^{2}). However, in contrast to Hugh Hefner, who threw wild parties at his Playboy Mansions, life at Guccione's mansion was remarkably sedate, even during the height of the sexual revolution in the 1970s. He reportedly once had his bodyguards eject a local radio personality who had been hired as a DJ and jumped into the swimming pool naked.

The magazine's pictorials offered more sexually explicit content than was commonly seen in most openly sold men's magazines of the era; it was the first to show female pubic hair, followed by full-frontal nudity and then the exposed vulva and anus. Up to the end of the 1960s, it was not acceptable to display anything more than a female's buttocks or breasts in mainstream publications and anything more risked obscenity charges. Only low-budget underground magazines displayed female genitals or explicit poses. However, the counterculture movement led to an increasingly liberated sexual attitude after which a series of court rulings struck down most legal restrictions on pornography. Penthouse has also, over the years, featured a number of authorized and unauthorized photos of celebrities such as Madonna and Vanessa Lynn Williams. In both cases, the photos were taken earlier in their careers and sold to Penthouse only after Madonna and Williams became famous. In Williams's case, this led to her forced resignation as Miss America 1984. The September 1984 issue in which Williams was first featured also included a layout with pornographic actress Traci Lords, who was only 15 when the photo shoot was done and was later revealed to be underage throughout most of her career. (Madonna famously responded to the publication of her nude photos by stating "So what?".) In the late 1990s, the magazine began to show more "fetish" content such as urination, bondage and "facials."

In the early 1970s, Guccione invested around US$45 million in construction of Haludovo Palace Hotel, a luxury hotel resort in Malinska on Krk Island near Rijeka on the northern Adriatic coast of Yugoslavia. He invested an additional $500,000 in advertisement. Despite Yugoslavia being nominally a communist country, it encouraged foreign investments. The entire project was designed by Yugoslav architect Boris Magaš and realized through Brodokomerc, a local company. Prior to that, the project needed to be authorized through a so-called workers' council, a process which Guccione described as "ridiculously easy". The hotel officially opened in 1972. Staff included around 50 Penthouse Pets, and the guests included the later Iraqi president Saddam Hussein. However, the hotel went bankrupt the next year.

In 1976, Guccione used about US $17.5 million of his personal fortune to finance the controversial historical drama erotic film Caligula, with Malcolm McDowell in the title role and a supporting cast including Helen Mirren, John Gielgud and Peter O'Toole. The film, released in late 1979, was produced in Italy (made at the Dear Studios in Rome) and was directed by Tinto Brass. Guccione also created the magazines Omni, Viva, and Longevity. Later Guccione started Penthouse Forum, which was more textual in content. In the early 2000s, Penthouse published a short-lived comic book spin-off entitled Penthouse Comix featuring sexually explicit stories.

In 1982, Guccione was listed in the Forbes 400 ranking of wealthiest people, with a reported $400 million net worth. An April 2002 New York Times article quoted Guccione as saying that Penthouse grossed $3.5 billion to $4 billion over the 30-year life of the company, with a net income of almost $500 million.

=== Awards and recognition ===
Guccione's editorial content was praised and recognized by some in the academic field. In 1975, for example, he was honored by Brandeis University for focusing "his editorial attention on such critical issues of our day as the welfare of the Vietnam veteran and problems of criminality in modern society."

Guccione was also praised by certain professional groups and associations for his dealings with them. In April 1978 he was named "Publisher of the Year" by the Atlantic Coast Independent Distributors Association in gratitude for his "leadership, his fair treatment and his continuing friendship with our members".

In 2013, director Barry Avrich made a film about Guccione's life entitled Filthy Gorgeous: The Bob Guccione Story. The film premiered at the Toronto International Film Festival on September 9, 2013. It was later broadcast in Canada on The Movie Network and Movie Central and in the United States on Epix in November 2013.

=== Decline and resignation ===
Several wildly unsuccessful investments by Guccione—including the Penthouse Boardwalk Hotel and Casino (which lost $160 million) and a (never-built) nuclear fusion power plant—added to his publishing empire's financial woes. Guccione's efforts to regain sales and notoriety, which included attempts to get Monica Lewinsky to pose for the magazine (which was parodied in a sketch on Saturday Night Live in 1998) and offering the Unabomber a free forum for his views, failed to increase readership. With the rise of online access to (often free) pornography in the late 1990s, Penthouse's circulation numbers suffered even more.

In 2003, General Media, Penthouse's publisher, filed for bankruptcy protection. Guccione resigned as chairman of the board and CEO of Penthouse International, Inc.

=== Legal dispute ===
In 2006, Guccione sued Penthouse Media Group for fraud, breach of contract, and conspiracy, among other charges. Some of the people named in the case were Marc Bell, Jason Galanis, Fernando Molina, and Daniel C. Stanton.

== Other ventures ==
=== Film ===
In 1974, Guccione invested in the film Chinatown and the end credits read A Paramount - Penthouse Presentation. He also invested in The Day of the Locust.

In 1976, Guccione invested around $17.5 million U.S. dollars of his personal funds for financing the historical drama erotic film Caligula.

In 2001, Penthouse Presents began running on Hot Choice.

=== Publications ===
Guccione also created the magazines Omni, Viva, and Longevity. Guccione gave Anna Wintour her first job as a fashion editor at his magazine Viva.

Later Guccione started Penthouse Forum, which predominantly featured erotic writing and stories. In 1993, Penthouse published an adult comic book spin-off entitled Penthouse Comix, featuring sexually explicit stories. After an initial success, Penthouse Comix expanded into a line of four illustrated magazines with the addition of Penthouse Max, Penthouse Men's Adventure Comix and Omni Comix. In 2023 Penthouse revived the comic label as Penthouse Comics. The first issue launched in February 2024 to 30,000 copies sold.

Penthouse Variations is a monthly magazine containing ostensibly reader-generated erotic stories (primarily) and some pictures and reviews. It is a spin-off magazine from Penthouse Letters. It was initially published in 1978. Variations focuses on "kinkier" topics of sexuality, such as bondage, fetish clothing, exhibitionism, voyeurism, foot fetishism, water sports, female dominance, bisexual exploration, transsexualism and sadomasochism, among others.

=== Home video ===
In 1983, Penthouse teamed up with Vestron Video to launch the Penthouse Video label. In 1991, Penthouse Video signed a deal with A*Vision Entertainment to release videos designed for an adult audience.

=== Casinos ===
In 1970, the Penthouse Club in London, England operated a casino. However, the next year the casino license was revoked by the gaming authorities. In 1972, Penthouse opened the Penthouse Adriatic Club casino on the island of Krk in Yugoslavia (now Croatia) at a cost of $45 million. However, the casino filed for bankruptcy the following year and was closed. In 1978, Penthouse began construction of the Penthouse Boardwalk Hotel and Casino in Atlantic City, New Jersey. However, Penthouse was unable to raise additional funding and construction stopped in 1980. The project sat idle until Donald Trump acquired the site in 1993.

=== Auto racing ===
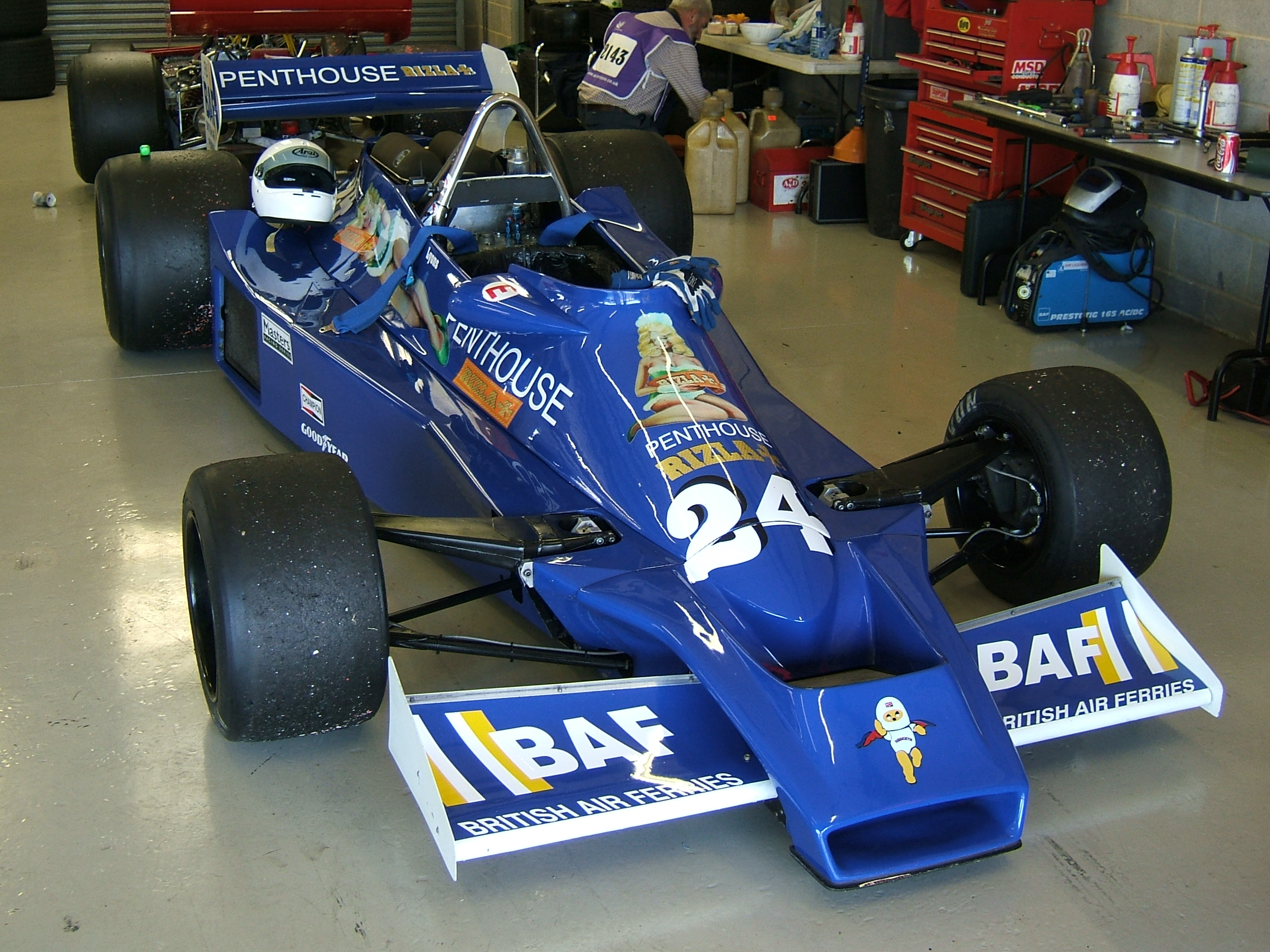
A Hesketh 308E in 1977's Penthouse Rizla Racing livery

Penthouse sponsors the "1X" car of driver Randy Hannagan in the World of Outlaws sprint car series. The magazine previously sponsored cars in the Formula One circuit from the late 1970s to the early 1980s. Teams included Hesketh Racing and RAM Racing.

== Personal life ==
=== Family ===
Guccione's British-raised son, Bob Guccione Jr. (born 1955), was given editorship of Spin, but father and son soon fell out over editorial decisions, and Bob Jr. eventually found independent investors to continue financing the magazine. They remained estranged for a long time, but reportedly reconciled before Guccione Sr.'s death in 2010.

=== Marriages ===
Guccione was married four times. He first married Lilyann Becker in his late teens and had one child.

His second was to a British woman, Muriel Hudson, with whom he had four children. They divorced in 1979.

His third marriage, in 1988, was to his long-time companion, Kathy Keeton, a native of South Africa. In 1997, Keeton died of complications from surgery to remedy an obstruction in her digestive tract after a long battle with cancer. She was 58.

Later, in 2006, he married April Dawn Warren, who remained his wife until his death in 2010.

=== Residence ===
Guccione brought artisans in from France and Italy to remodel the largest private residence in Manhattan (at 14-16 East 67th Street on the Upper East Side). As a tribute to Guccione, the artisans carved both his and his wife's faces into the marble columns near the entrance of the mansion. According to New York magazine, "It's one of the biggest private houses in Manhattan, with 30 rooms, and it costs $5 million a year to maintain."

In November 2003, the mansion was foreclosed on by Kennedy Funding of New Jersey, the mortgage holder, along with an affiliate of multibillion-dollar hedge fund Elliott Associates of New Jersey. In January 2004, a group of investors came to Guccione's aid during his eviction. A London-based investor, Jason Galanis, led the investment group which purchased the property for $26.5 million in cash. The house was purchased by NY Real Estate LLC, an entity set up to acquire the mansion. Galanis contributed $2.6 million, and two New York hedge funds, Laurus Funds and Alexandre Asset Management, made a mortgage loan of $24 million to NY Real Estate LLC, which was owned by Penthouse International, the parent and debtor-in-possession of General Media.

As a result of the continuing contentious bankruptcy, which lasted over a year, the promissory notes due to Laurus were considered in technical breach of covenants which resulted in severe financial penalties in excess of $8 million. Penthouse International elected to forgo refinancing the house due to the combination of the penalties and the unfavorable lifetime lease of $1 per year that was granted to Guccione, which made the property unmarketable. Laurus sued Guccione to take possession of the house from the tenant.

Guccione also lost his country house in Staatsburg, New York, as the 15-room Baroque-style stucco mansion on a 75-acre property on the Hudson River was foreclosed and sold for $4 million. The estate was purchased by actress Uma Thurman and hotelier André Balazs, and it is now known as Locusts on Hudson.

=== Art collection ===
Guccione was a painter whose art premiered at Nassau County Museum of Art as well as the Butler Institute of American Art. His art continues to hang in the Borghi Fine Art Gallery, is featured in the POBA - Where the Arts Live online collection, and is a part of the Filthy Gorgeous Media art collection. Bob Guccione was a world-renowned collector of fine art. Highlights of the Guccione collection included a portrait by Amedeo Modigliani and a Pablo Picasso portrait of the artist's son, Paulo. He owned paintings by Sandro Botticelli, Albrecht Dürer, El Greco, Marc Chagall, Salvador Dalí, Giorgio de Chirico, Edgar Degas, Fernand Léger, Gilbert Stone, Henri Matisse, Jules Pascin, Camille Pissarro, Pierre-Auguste Renoir, Georges Henri Rouault, Chaïm Soutine, and Vincent van Gogh.

The Guccione art collection was sold at auction by Sotheby's in November 2002 to pay Guccione's personal debts, originally incurred in the Atlantic City venture. The collection had been appraised by Christie's at $59 million two years previously. However, 9/11 had depressed the art market and the Guccione collection failed to sell for its appraised price. The aggregate sale price was $19 million, which was used to pay lender Swiss Re. Swiss Re sued Guccione in New York State Court for a $4 million shortfall on the loan balance. Much of the remaining personal collection of Bob Guccione's art, photographs, and memorabilia was acquired by entrepreneur Jeremy Frommer in early 2012. The acquisition included over 60 original Guccione Oils, as well as the original illustrations and photographs by artists such as Arthur Cummings, Bill Lee, Suze Randall, Earl Miller, Berth Milton Sr. and more. The highlight of the collection is the quarter of a million photographs that were taken by Bob Guccione, himself, throughout the 1960s, 1970s and 1980s. The items obtained by Frommer were the inspiration for his company Jerrick Ventures LLC's creation of the website Filthy Gorgeous Media, which debuted in June 2013.

Guccione had a history of leveraging his prized asset. He borrowed $20 million from AIG, the insurance company. Subsequently, they refinanced with Swiss Re Insurance.

== Illness and death ==
By 2004, Guccione, a heavy smoker, had undergone surgery for throat cancer and stated: "My cancer was only a tiny tumor about the size of an almond at the base of my tongue. The cure is probably every bit as bad as the disease. It's affected my ability to swallow ... the mobility of my tongue ... it makes it very difficult for me to talk." Guccione was later diagnosed with terminal lung cancer and died on October 20, 2010, at the age of 79, at Plano Specialty Hospital in Plano, Texas, with his wife April at his side.
