= Plaza Midwood =

- Neighborhood
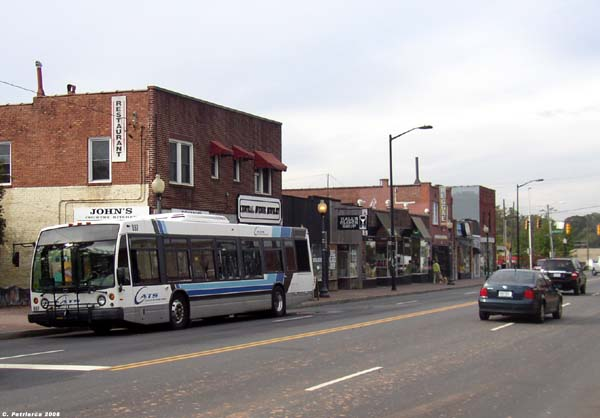
- Central Avenue as it passes through Plaza Midwood
- Interactive map of Plaza Midwood
- Coordinates: 35°13′14.23″N 80°48′39.71″W
- Country: United States
- State: North Carolina
- County: Mecklenburg
- City: Charlotte
- Council District: 1
- Neighborhood Profile Areas: 378
- Chatham Estates: 1903
- Founder: Paul Chatham

Government
  - City Council: Larken Egleston (D)

Area
  - Total: 914 acres (370 ha)

Population (2015)
  - Total: 4,350
  - Density: 3,050/sq mi (1,180/km^{2})
- Time zone: UTC-5 (EST)
  - Summer (DST): UTC-4 (EDT)
- Zip Code: 28204, 28205
- Area codes: 704, 980

Plaza Midwood is a neighborhood located approximately one mile to the east of Uptown in Charlotte, North Carolina. The neighborhood is roughly bound by Hawthorne Lane to the west, The Plaza to the north, Briar Creek Road and the Charlotte Country Club to the east and Central Avenue to the south.

Locally known as one of Charlotte's most diverse and eclectic neighborhoods, it is filled with art galleries, funky stores, and restaurants. Just south of Central Avenue in the Plaza-Midwood neighborhood is the 19 acre Veterans Park.

== History ==
Plaza Midwood was first established in 1910 as a streetcar suburb of Charlotte. The Oakland Land Company was responsible for the layout of the roads within the neighborhood. Through the Great Depression, Plaza Midwood would thrive, before its decline commenced in the 1950s.

By 1975, the Plaza Midwood Neighborhood Association was established to protect and preserve the neighborhood.

Since the mid-1990s, the area has seen a dramatic comeback as reinvestment has transformed once dilapidated homes into funky urban dwellings. It continued redevelopment has spilled over into other surrounding neighborhoods, and resulted in the overall renaissance of the former inner-ring suburbs of old Charlotte.

Plaza Midwood's Historic District is located in the western section of the neighborhood and is maintained by residents and business operators. The area along The Plaza, Thomas Avenue and parts of Pecan and Clement were designated as a Local Historic District in 1992. The district is now regulated by the Historic District Commission.

Plaza Midwood, along with Dilworth and NoDa, have a large population of LGBTQ residents. In 2015, a report from the Census Bureau found that more than 350 LGBTQ households were in Plaza Midwood and NoDa.

== Demographics ==
Historical population
Census	Pop.	Note	%±
2000	3,897		—
2010	3,993		2.5%
2015 (est.)	4,350		8.9%

As of 2010, Plaza Midwood had a population of 3,993. The racial makeup of the neighborhood was 84.2% White American, 8.2% Black or African American, 1.6% Asian American, and 2.8% of some other race. Hispanic or Latino American of any race were 3.2% of the population. The median household income for the area was $97,576.

== Transportation infrastructure ==
=== Mass transit ===
The following buses from the Charlotte Area Transit System (CATS) serve the Plaza Midwood neighborhood:

- #4 (Country Club)
- #9 (Central Avenue)
- #17 (Commonwealth)
- #39 (Eastway)

Five stops are planned for the future CityLynx Gold Line streetcar, with stations proposed for Hawthorne at Barnhardt, the Plaza, St. Julien Street, Iris Drive, and Morningside Drive. There are also possible plans for a stop along the future Silver Line light rail in Plaza Midwood, though an alignment for the line hasn't been finalized.

=== Roads ===
The major thoroughfares are Central Avenue, Hawthorne Lane and The Plaza.

== Education and libraries ==
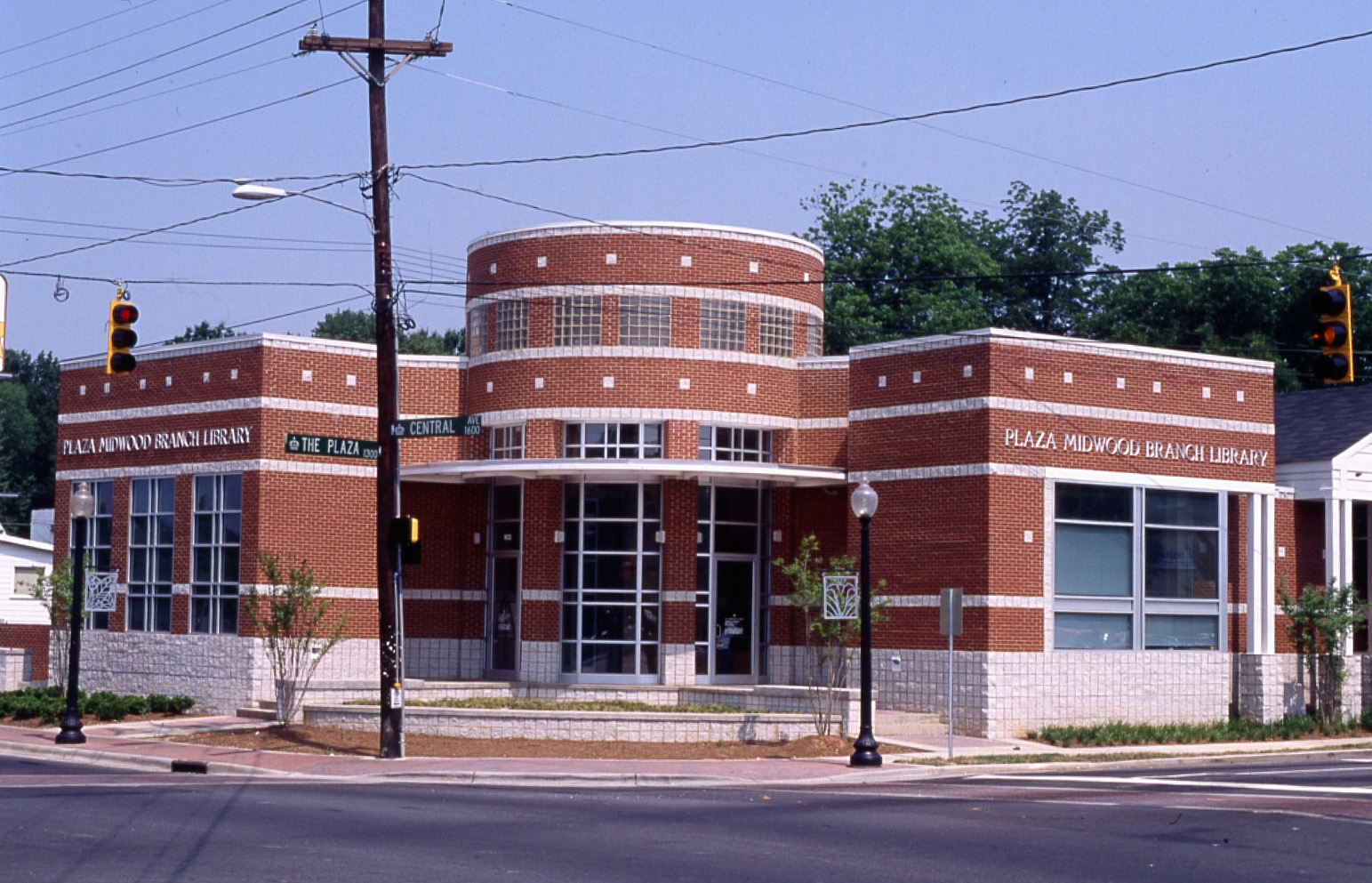
The Plaza Midwood branch of the Public Library of Charlotte and Mecklenburg County

=== School system ===
Residents of Plaza Midwood attend Charlotte-Mecklenburg Schools, including Eastway Middle School, Garinger High School and Shamrock Gardens Elementary School.

=== Libraries ===
Plaza Midwood is served by the Plaza Midwood branch of the Public Library of Charlotte and Mecklenburg County. The library is located on the corner of the Central Avenue and The Plaza.

=== References in popular culture ===
Pop musician Jon Lindsay included a reference to the neighborhood (in which he also owns a home) in the title of his official label debut LP, Escape From Plaza-Midwood, released August 17, 2010 on Chocolate Lab Records. Plaza Midwood was also used as Little Korea for the USA Network pilot for the show "The Novice" in December 2013

== See also ==
- Thirsty Beaver
