= Akio Kashiwagi =

Japanese businessman and gambler (1938–1992)

- 柏木昭男
- Born: 1937 or 1938; Japan
- Died: January 3, 1992 (aged 53-54); Kawaguchiko, Japan
- Cause of death: Stabbing (unsolved)
- Occupations: Real estate investor, gambler

Akio Kashiwagi (柏木昭男, Kashiwagi Akio), also known as "The Warrior", was a Japanese businessman and gambler who was known for his extravagant lifestyle and alleged connections to organized crime. In the early 1990s, Kashiwagi gained international notoriety for his high-stakes gambling at casinos in the United States and Australia. He was involved in several publicized incidents, including a dispute with then businessman Donald Trump and with other casinos over his gambling debts. In 1992, Kashiwagi was murdered in his home in Japan. The culprit was never found.

== Early life ==
Kashiwagi was the son of a carpenter and was born in a poor family, with nine siblings. He dropped out of high school and worked as a farmhand before becoming a mountain guide and luggage handler at Mount Fuji.

== Business career ==
In the early 1960s, Kashiwagi moved to Kawaguchiko, and became a real estate developer. Over the decade, the area's infrastructure improved and it became a popular tourist destination. According to Japanese press, local real estate values increased a millionfold. In 1969, Kashiwagi founded a real estate company called Kashiwagi Shoji and a lending company. It was alleged that he would disappear when borrowers came to pay him so that their debts would be overdue and he could subsequently seize their collateral for failure to pay. In Kanagawa Prefecture, he acquired the land owned by a kindergarten while children were still attending the school, and demolished it to build an apartment complex. He also purchased another plot of land in Tokyo, where a family refused to sell their first-floor apartment. After he demolished the second floor, the family sued him for harassment and obtained a restraining order. According to media interviews of his friends, Kashiwagi stopped resorting to these aggressive practices in his later years.

Kashiwagi was a secretive figure and was alleged to have connections to organized crime, which he used to intimidate tenants. He claimed that his company earned $100 million a year and had $1 billion in assets, although The Wall Street Journal reported that Kashiwagi Shoji had revenues of only $15 million in 1988, with only five employees.

== Gambling habits ==
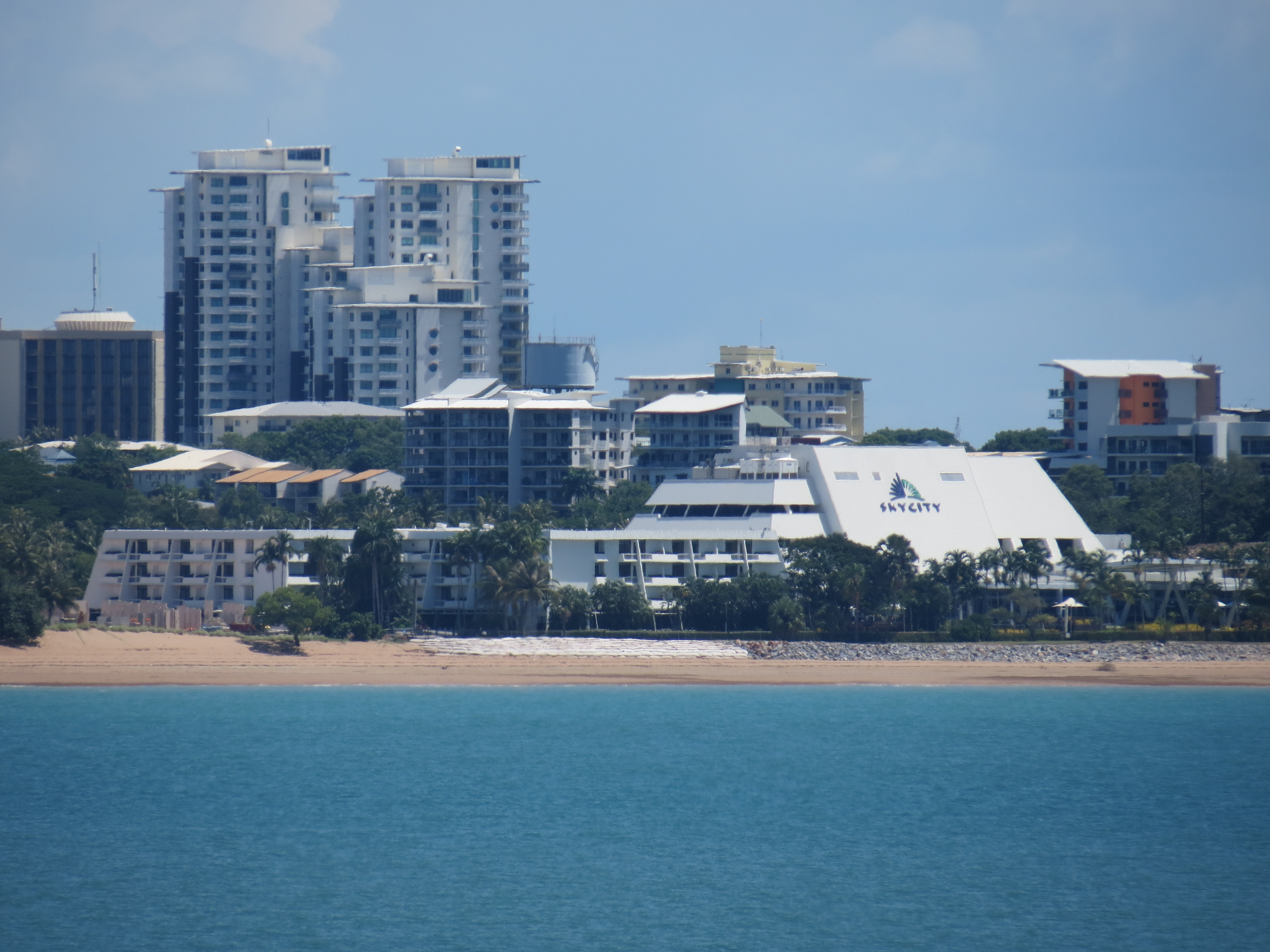
The Diamond Beach casino (later named SkyCity, then Mindil Beach Casino & Resort), where Kashiwagi won $22 million and became famous in the gambling world

Kashiwagi started visiting casinos in the 1980s, frequently playing baccarat for large sums of money. He could bet up to $100,000 a hand playing for 80 hours at a time, according to Dennis Gomes, president of Trump Taj Mahal. He was known by casino owners as a "whale", someone who gambles substantial sums of money, and is further incentivized with a very high credit line. In January 1990, he won around $22 million (Note: According to the Los Angeles Times and the Financial Times. "Nearly $20 million" according to Barron's.) (¥3 billion) at the Diamond Beach casino in Darwin, Australia, which made him famous in the gambling world. Kashiwagi was among the world's biggest "whales". The character of K.K. Ichikawa (played by Nobu Matsuhisa) in the film Casino was based on Kashiwagi.

At the time, businessman Donald Trump owned several casinos in Atlantic City, New Jersey, including the Trump Castle and Trump Plaza. In February 1990, after learning about Kashiwagi from fellow casino owner James Goldsmith, Trump invited Kashiwagi to Trump Plaza, where he was given a luxurious penthouse with an ocean view, grand piano, and a $800,000 jade statue of the Buddha. A baccarat table was reserved for him. John O'Donnell, Trump Plaza's chief operating officer, stated that Kashiwagi's presence at the casino was "an enormous [publicity] coup" that gave it a "world-class image" and reinforcing the "elegance and excitement" of the Trump brand. O'Donnell also says Kashiwagi brought $6 million, and was given another $6 million in credit on his first visit. Trump invited several journalists to Trump Plaza to cover the event. Kashiwagi started playing on the first evening, and won $4 million by the close that night. In his book The Art of the Comeback, Trump says Kashiwagi won $1 million in the first half an hour. Baccarat offers a house advantage of around 1%, much smaller than other games, and Trump wrote that he was concerned about the casino's finances, as Kashiwagi played "$250,000 per hand, 70 times an hour". Kashiwagi experienced streaks of gains and losses throughout his stay, but left abruptly after two days, with a total gain of $6.2 million, which placed Trump in financial difficulty.

To improve his chances in a rematch with Kashiwagi, Trump enlisted the assistance of mathematician Jess Marcum. Marcum calculated that Kashiwagi's odds would decrease the longer he played. Marcum and casino expert Al Glasgow devised an informal agreement in which Kashiwagi would agree to remain at the casino until he had doubled his money or lost it all. According to Marcum's calculations, if Kashiwagi played for more than 75 hours, his chances of winning would be only 15%. Kashiwagi returned in May for a weeklong game. According to Trump, Kashiwagi was up by $9.6 million early in the week. Trump noticed that Kashiwagi seemed to have worse luck when the dealers were a group of young women, so he instructed they remain assigned to Kashiwagi. When Trump ended the game, Kashiwagi had lost $10 million over 6 days. Some reports stated that Kashiwagi still had $2 million in chips, while others claimed that he "walked out in a huff" when his credit was not extended. In The Art of the Comeback, Trump claims that the agreement was to end the game once Kashiwagi had won or lost $10 million. However, Kashiwagi later told the media that the deal was for $12 million and that Trump ended the game prematurely and did not uphold his end of the deal.

Kashiwagi paid Trump $6 million of the $10 million he owed, he was unable to pay the rest. Gomes, of the Trump Taj Mahal, stated that Kashiwagi had a reputation for renegotiating debts to his advantage. Afterwards, Kashiwagi flew to Europe in an attempt to recoup his losses, but ended up losing an additional $15.4 million. Following the burst of the Japanese asset price bubble in 1988, Kashiwagi Shoji went underwater on its large amounts of borrowing; it was reported that Kashiwagi owed $131 million to a bank, which exceeded the book value of his company's assets. He only paid back European creditors $5.3 million, and still owed $5 million to the Las Vegas Hilton, and $4 million to Trump Plaza and Casino. The latter had written off $1 million of the debt by the time of Kashiwagi's death.

== Personal life ==
Kashiwagi owned several luxury cars, and numerous expensive diamonds. He also owned rare artwork, including paintings by Yokoyama Taikan, which he sometimes loaned to museums. He spent $38 million building his home, known as the Kashiwagi Castle or Kashiwagi Palace, located on the shore of Lake Kawaguchiko, near Mount Fuji.

In public, Kashiwagi had a subdued style, and did not wear jewelry or cufflinks. The Wall Street Journal described him as wearing a "rumpled blue-striped shirt and plain black slippers", with "the look of a quarter slot-machine player just off the bus from Hoboken". Other outlets describe him as "always [wearing] blue-and-white striped shirts [and] somber ties", and a bank clerk's grey suit. While staying at American casinos, he often ordered BLT sandwiches and a dish of marinated monkey meat.

Kashiwagi had three children.

== Murder ==
On January 3, 1992, between 7:00 p.m. and 8:00 p.m., Kashiwagi was found murdered in the kitchen of his Mount Fuji home, aged 54 years old. He had been stabbed with an object similar to a katana sword, and media reports disagree on whether he was stabbed 10 times, 20 times, "dozens of times", or "up to 150" times. His diamonds, antiques, and $770,000 in cash were left untouched, and there was no sign of a break-in.

At the time of his death, Kashiwagi owed U.S. casinos "at least" $9 million, and owed European creditors around $10 million. Kashiwagi had recently failed to repay his European creditors, leading Japanese media to speculate that he had been made an example of.

On February 1, 1992, the Japanese police arrested a man belonging to the yakuza and a woman, charging them with murder and destruction of evidence, respectively. The man had known Kashiwagi's son and was reportedly "deeply in debt". Kashiwagi had previously purchased a car worth ¥3.5 million ($34,500) from the man, who claimed that Kashiwagi had not paid him. The woman was accused of helping the man wipe Kashiwagi's blood from the getaway car. Both suspects denied the charges. After the police were unable to find the murder weapon, the suspects were released.

The culprit was never found, and the statute of limitations for Kashiwagi's murder expired in January 2007, after 15 years.

== See also ==
- List of unsolved murders (1980–1999)
