= Trump Plaza Hotel and Casino =

Former hotel and casino in Atlantic City, New Jersey

Trump Plaza
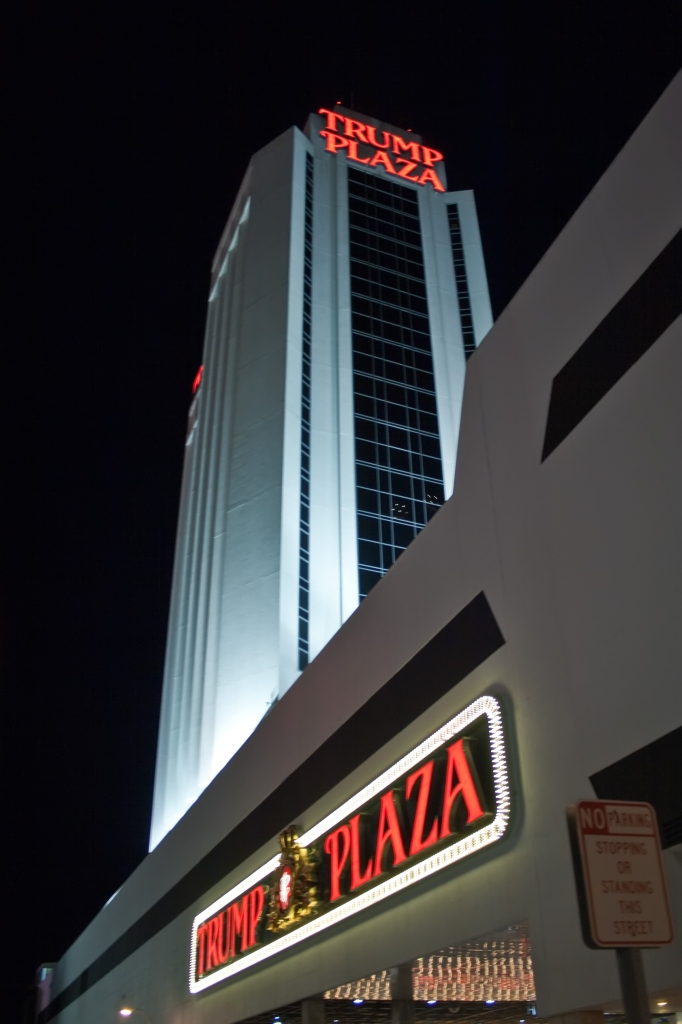
- Trump Plaza in September 2007
- Interactive map of Trump Plaza
- Location: Atlantic City, New Jersey, U.S.; 2500 Boardwalk; 39°21′19″N 74°26′15″W
- Opened: May 14, 1984
- Closed: September 16, 2014
- Demolished: February 17, 2021
- Theme: Luxury
- No. of rooms: 906
- Gaming space: 91,181 sq ft (8,471.0 m^{2})
- Permanent shows: Beatle Mania, Boxing
- Signature attractions: Trump Plaza Beach Bar
- Notable restaurants: Max's Steakhouse, 24 Central Cafe, Rainforest Cafe
- Casino type: Land-based
- Owner: Trump Entertainment Resorts
- Operating license holder: Trump Plaza Associates
- Architect: Alan Lapidus, Martin Stern Jr, SOSH Architects (Casino and Hotel Renovations)
- Previous names: Harrah's at Trump Plaza (1984)
- Renovated in: 1990 (East Tower), 2006
- Website: web.archive.org/web/20250206092237/https://www.trumphotels.com/las-vegas

Trump Plaza was a hotel and casino on the Boardwalk in Atlantic City, New Jersey, owned by Trump Entertainment Resorts. Designed by architect Alan Lapidus, it operated from May 14, 1984, until September 16, 2014.

== History ==
=== Early years ===
The Trump Organization, a company owned by Donald Trump, began construction of the casino in June 1982. Harrah's, the gaming unit of Holiday Inn, joined as a partner a month later. Trump would oversee the construction, while Harrah's would operate the property, referred to as Harrah's Boardwalk, after opening.

The property opened as Harrah's at Trump Plaza on May 14, 1984. The complex contained 614 rooms, seven restaurants, a health club, a 750-seat showroom and a 60,000 sq ft (5,574.2 m^{2}) casino, all on a narrow 2.6 acres (1.1 ha) plot of land next to Caesars Atlantic City. Five months after opening, the name was changed to simply Trump Plaza, to avoid confusion with Harrah's Marina. Part of the reason for this is that Harrah's was commonly associated with and attracted low-rolling gamblers, but Trump had built 85 high-roller suites, which were rarely used. The casino performed poorly, with pre-tax profits of just $144,000 in the first half of 1985. The poor results exacerbated disagreements between Trump and Harrah's, leading to Trump buying out Harrah's interest in the property for $70 million in May 1986.

In 1989, Trump paid $62 million to purchase the neighboring, unfinished Penthouse Boardwalk Hotel and Casino, including a hotel tower that had formerly been a Holiday Inn, and a nearby parking lot. Trump expanded the Plaza onto the Penthouse site, renaming it Trump Plaza Hotel and Casino East Tower. Trump also spent $63 million to purchase the bankrupt Atlantis Casino Hotel, separated from Trump Plaza by the Atlantic City Convention Hall, and rebranded it as the Trump Regency, a hotel annex to the Plaza.

Trump Plaza hosted the WrestleMania IV and WrestleMania V events in 1988 and 1989 respectively. Although the World Wrestling Federation billed the events as being held at Trump Plaza, in reality Trump was only the sponsor of both events, which were held at adjacent Boardwalk Hall. From 1985 to 1998, the hotel was also the onsite host of 19 professional boxing program events.

The casino was the scene of a notorious baccarat session in May 1990, in which the Japanese high roller Akio Kashiwagi lost $10 million. The incident was later fictionalized in Martin Scorsese's film Casino.

=== Decline ===
Trump Plaza's revenues took a sharp decline in 1990, due to competition from its newly opened sister property, the Trump Taj Mahal, which was a mile away. The casino narrowly averted default on a 1991 payment to bondholders by taking out a $25 million mortgage on its parking garage. Trump then negotiated a debt restructuring with the Plaza's creditors, under which their $250 million of debt would be exchanged for $200 million of bonds with a lower interest rate, plus $100 million of preferred stock. The plan was submitted as a prepackaged bankruptcy in March 1992.

In 1993, Atlantic City casino development authority began condemning hundreds of properties, for the expansion of Trump Plaza Hotel and Casino. In 1998, a court stopped the condemnation of the Sabatini's restaurant, one of the properties. In 2005, Donald Trump agreed to buy the property for around $2 million, exceeding the first offer of $700,000.

Construction of a $42-million expansion began in 1993. The plan called for demolition of the unfinished Penthouse casino, the addition of 30,000 square feet of gaming space, and renovation of the former Holiday Inn building to become Trump Plaza's East Tower, with 361 hotel rooms. The expansion was at the center of a major eminent domain court case, when Trump sought to obtain the property of Vera Coking, a retired homeowner whose house was adjacent to the Penthouse casino. Coking, represented by the Institute for Justice, was victorious, and plans to build a limousine parking lot were thwarted.

In 1995, Trump granted ownership of Trump Plaza to his new publicly traded company, Trump Hotels & Casino Resorts (later Trump Entertainment Resorts). The company also acquired the Trump Regency hotel.

The East Tower opened in two phases, in October 1995 and February 1996. The expansion continued with the May 1996 opening of Trump World's Fair, a $48-million renovation of the Trump Regency with an added casino, connected to Trump Plaza by a loggia across the Atlantic City Convention Hall.

In 2004, the building hosted UFC 50.

On May 24, 2011, Trump Entertainment Resorts announced that a decision would be made within two months to either sell the casino or to renovate and expand it, possibly with a joint venture partner. In February 2013, the company proposed to sell the property for $20 million to the Meruelo Group, a California-based company whose businesses include the Grand Sierra Resort in Reno. Meruelo planned to make significant investments in the property and rename it. The deal fell through when Carl Icahn, senior lender for Trump Plaza's mortgage, declined to approve the sale for the proposed price.

=== Closure ===
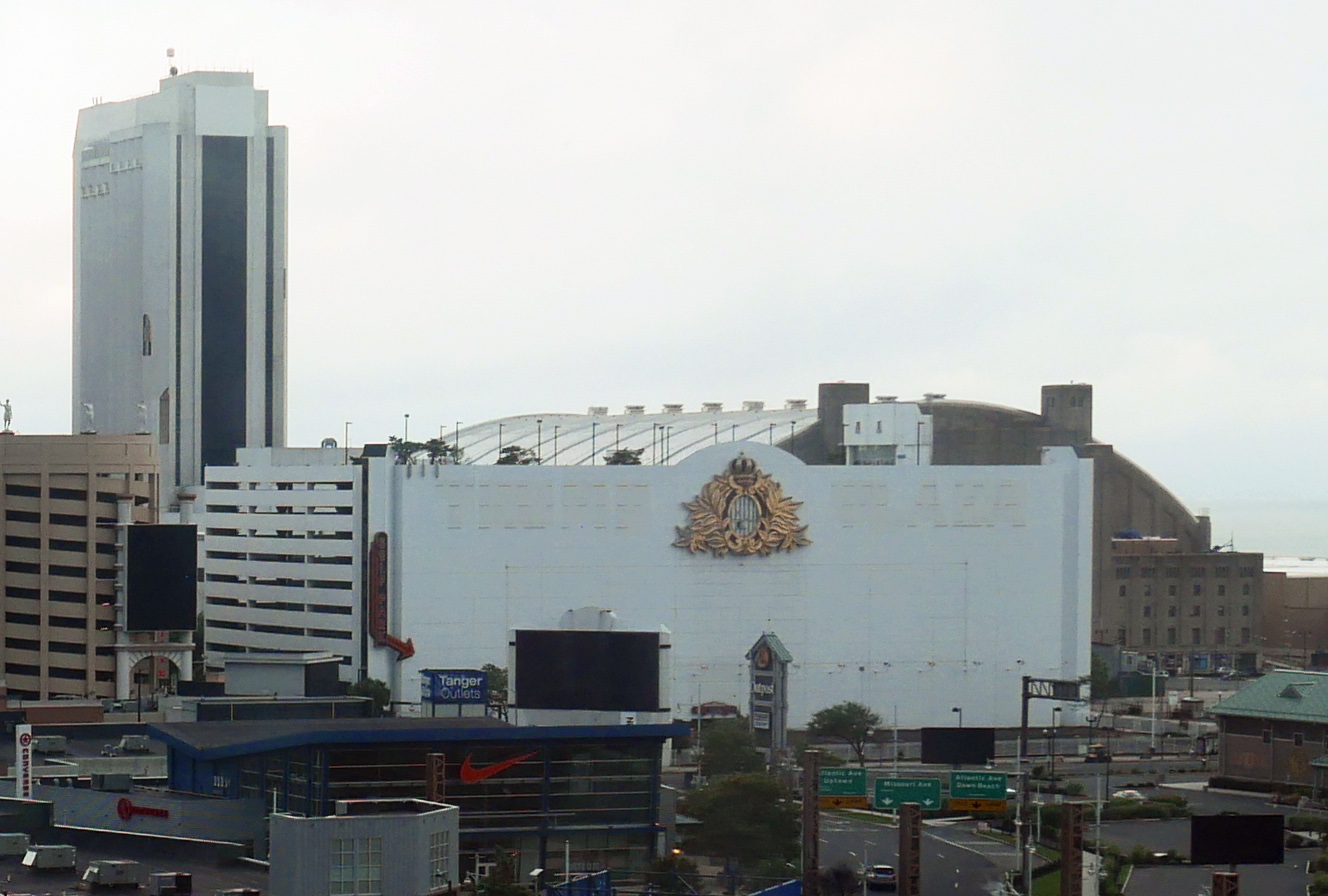
The former Trump Plaza Hotel and Casino after closure

On July 12, 2014, it was reported that the Trump Plaza Hotel and Casino would close on September 16, 2014, if a buyer was not found, putting an estimated 1,000 employees out of work. In early August 2014, Donald Trump filed a lawsuit requesting his name be removed from the facility, because it had fallen into disrepair, in violation of the licensing agreement for his name.

Trump Plaza closed permanently on September 16, 2014. This was the fourth Atlantic City casino to close in 2014, after the Atlantic Club, Showboat, and Revel. The closure left approximately 1,300 employees out of work.

=== Demolition ===
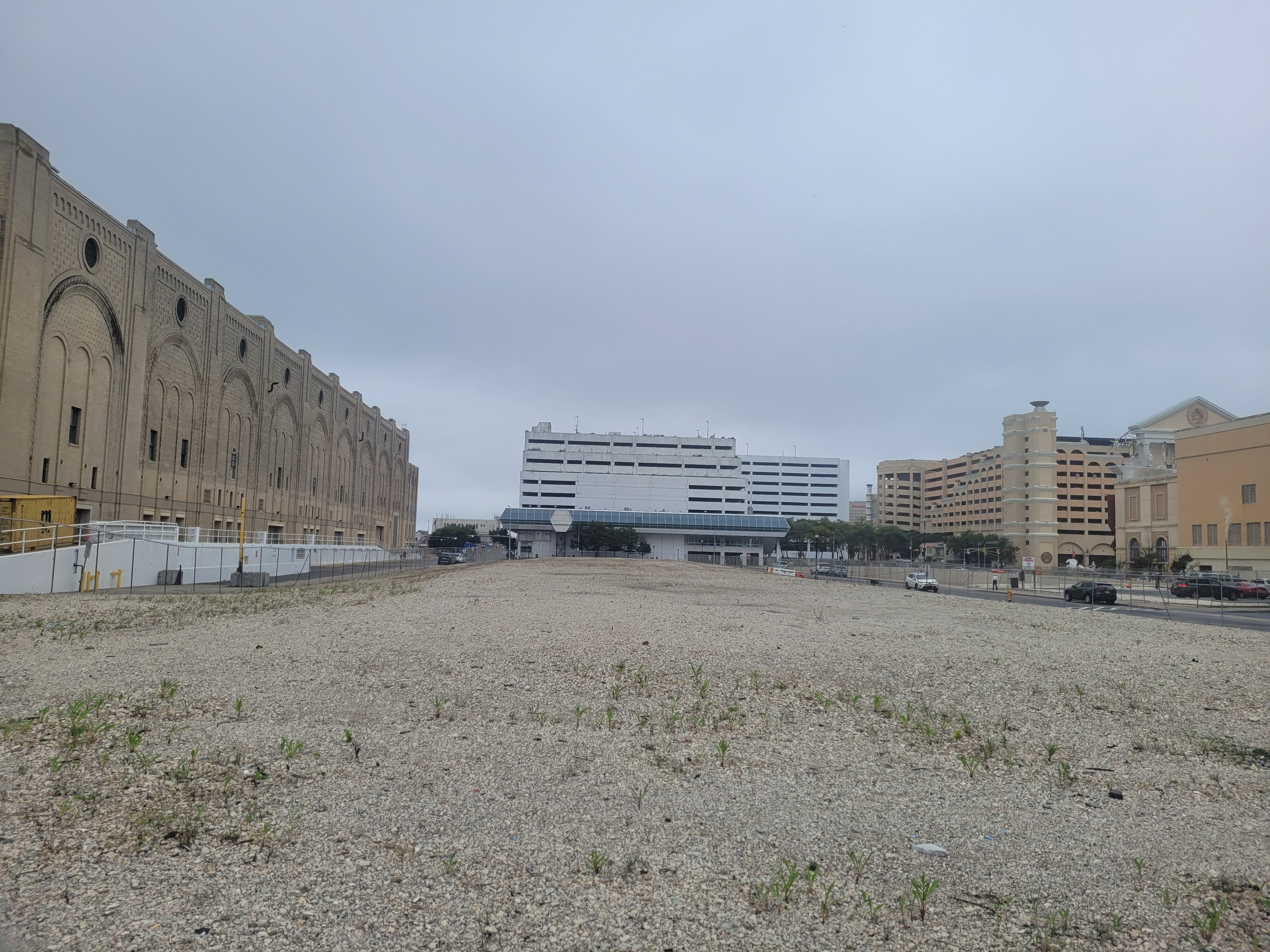
The lot of the former Trump Plaza remains empty as of 2025. Boardwalk Hall can be seen on the left.

The building was set to be demolished in the spring of 2018, except for the East Tower and the parking garage. On May 29, 2018, the demolition plans had been delayed until at least the following fall due to funding disputes. On December 14, 2018, another demolition deadline passed. Carl Icahn bought the deed to the land Trump Plaza sits on, and terminated the complicated lease on the land that drove potential buyers out in late December 2018.

On June 11, 2020, Mayor Marty Small Sr. announced that Icahn has submitted plans for the hotel towers to be imploded, as they were considered a danger to public safety because of falling debris. Most of Trump Plaza in Atlantic City was slated to be demolished on January 29, 2021. Atlantic City planned to auction off the right to press the button detonating the explosives, with the proceeds to benefit the Boys & Girls Club of Atlantic City. The auction was cancelled after lawyers for IEP AC Plaza LLC, a subsidiary company of Icahn Enterprises which owns the building, said they were unaware of the fundraiser and demanded it be stopped. The Trump Plaza Hotel and Casino was imploded on February 17, 2021. It became the second hotel-casino in Atlantic City to be demolished by an implosion after the Sands Hotel and Casino in 2007.

In 2026, George Norcross and his family purchased the property.

== Hotel ==
Trump Plaza had 906 hotel rooms, and offered five room styles for guests to choose from. There were also several amenities provided to hotel guests, such as a pool and a fitness center.

=== Rooms and suites ===
- Deluxe room: A regular hotel room. Accustomed by two queen-size beds, or one king-size bed.
- Ocean View suite: The same luxuries as the Deluxe hotel room but with a view of the Atlantic Ocean.
- Executive suite: A suite with two bedrooms and a living area as well as the kitchen.
- Contemporary suite: A suite with three bedrooms and a living area as well as the kitchen.
- Penthouse suite: A five bedroom suite with a marble/gold chandelier. Two living rooms, a kitchen, pool-area on the deck, and a statue of Donald John Trump in the foyer.

=== Amenities ===
- Indoor pool
- Spa
- Salon
- Fitness center

== Casino ==
Trump Plaza contained 91,181 sq ft (8,471.0 m2) of gaming space and featured standard casino games such as slot machines, video poker, blackjack, poker, craps, roulette, baccarat, and others.

== Dining ==
Trump Plaza had several restaurants.

=== Fine dining ===
- Max's Steakhouse
- Roberto's Ristorante

=== Casual dining ===
- 24 Central Cafe
- China Cafe
- Evo
- Liquid Bar
- Rainforest Cafe
- Sarah's Cookies
- Buffet (Various Names)
- Room Service

=== Quick service ===
- Häagen-Dazs
- Nathan's Famous
- Sbarro
- Starbucks Coffee
- Auntie Anne's

== Bars and nightclubs ==
Trump Plaza contained one nightclub, Liquid Bar and Jezebel's, as well as a seasonal bar on the beach named The Beach Bar at Trump Plaza.

== Shopping ==
There were a few shopping options for those wishing to shop at Trump Plaza.

=== Stores ===
- Landau Jewelers
- Front Page Gift Shop
- Floral services

== Events ==
Sports
Boxing and mixed martial arts matches were commonly held at the casino, most notably the well-televised match between professional boxers Mike Tyson and José Ribalta on August 17, 1986.

it also hosted WrestleMania 4 in 1988 and the following WrestleMania 5 in 1989, making it the first arena to hold 2 consecutive WrestleMania's

== See also ==
- Gambling in New Jersey
- List of tallest buildings in Atlantic City
