= Thirsty Beaver =

Bar in Charlotte, North Carolina

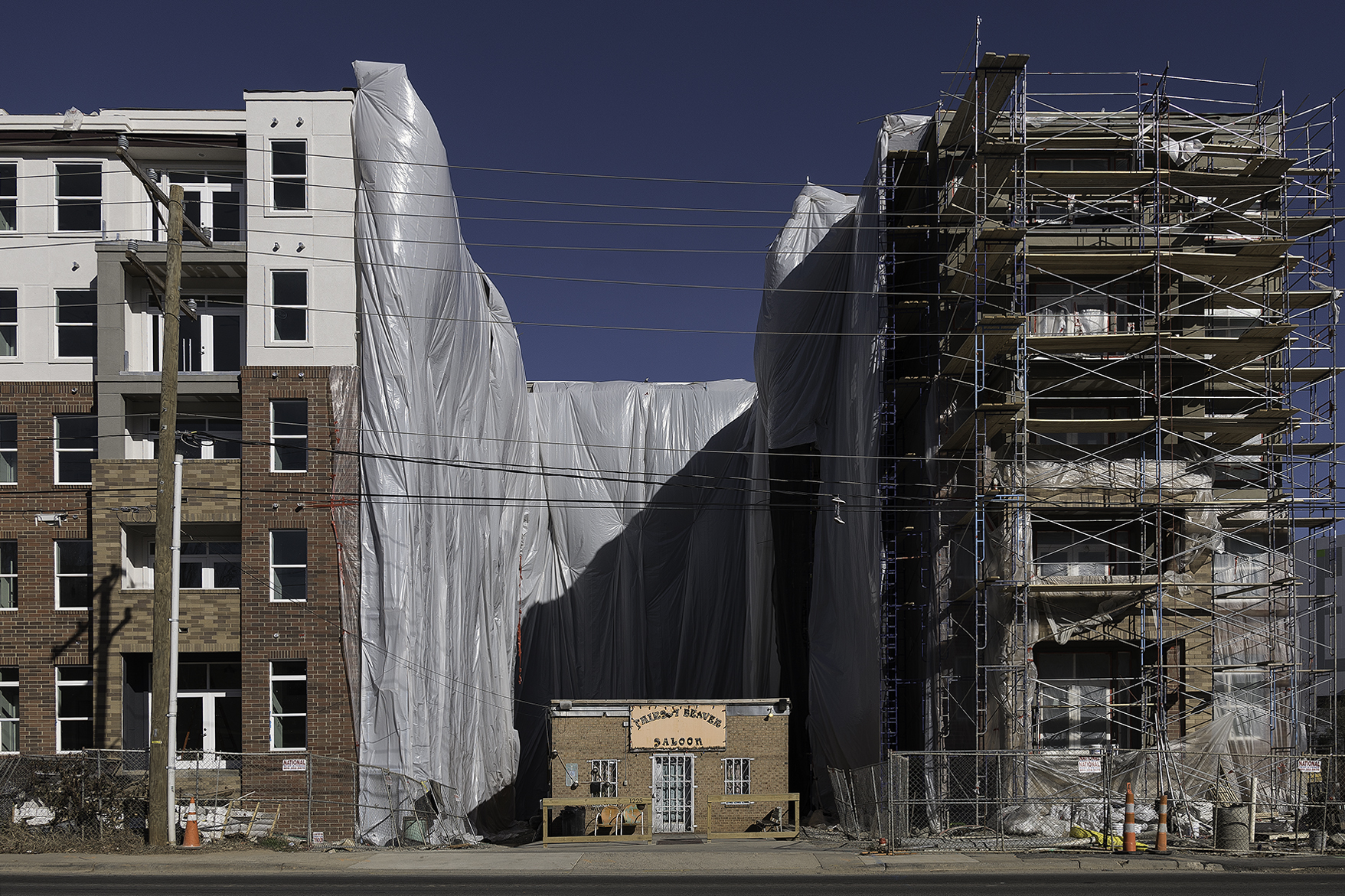
- The Thirsty Beaver in 2018

- Location within North Carolina Location within the United States

Restaurant information
- Established: 2008
- Owners: Brian and Mark Wilson
- Location: 1225 Central Ave, Charlotte, Mecklenburg County, North Carolina, 28204, US
- Coordinates: 35.2213°N 80.8173°W

The Thirsty Beaver is a bar (sometimes referred to as a dive bar) surrounded by an apartment complex, in Charlotte, North Carolina, United States. The establishment was started in a one-story building by two brothers in 2008. When established, the property was surrounded by vacant lots but in 2015, a development company purchased all of the land surrounding the bar. When George Salem, property owner and landlord to the Thirsty Beaver held out against two offers from a developer, the development company built apartments in a horseshoe shape around the building.

== History ==
The owners of the Thirsty Beaver are brothers Brian and Mark Wilson, who lease the bar from the property owner, George Salem. The Salem family owns the building and the strip of land where the bar sits. Salem has said that the land has been in his family for many years and he did not want to sell it. The bar was opened in 2008 and it was meant to be a neighborhood bar. The bar was surrounded by vacant lots at the time.

The Thirsty Beaver is located in the Plaza-Midwood neighborhood of Charlotte, North Carolina. It is one story tall and occupies 1,200 sq ft (110 m^{2}). The bar garnered attention when developers Crosland Southeast and Nuveen Real Estate began construction of an apartment complex in the immediate area and tried – but failed – to purchase the bar's property. The Washington Post stated that "this small dive bar is a middle finger to the development surrounding it". The bar's survival became what owner Mark Wilson referred to as "a protest".

In 2013, the owners of the vacant land around the building erected a fence which surrounded the building. Patrons of the Thirsty Beaver began attaching signs of support to the fence and some attached brassieres. The fire inspector assisted the bar owners in getting the fence removed and the bar remained open. In 2015, CW Development purchased all of the land around the Thirsty Beaver for US$8.5 million (equivalent to $11.5 million in 2025). The land was sold to develop a 323-unit apartment complex.

The developer twice offered to purchase the Thirsty Beaver property, but both offers were rejected. The developer stated, "We've made several attempts through the entire development process to acquire that property, very unsuccessfully."

When the owners of the land would not sell, an apartment building was constructed and wrapped around the Thirsty Beaver in the shape of a horseshoe. The Associated Press said the bar had become "Charlotte's own version of the house from Up, the Pixar movie".

== Features ==
The bar has been described as "quirky". On an orange side of the building is a large beaver with bloodshot eyes wearing a cowboy hat and boots. The Charlotte Observer noted that there are "dozens of bras nailed to the entrances". On the walls of the bar are a picture of Waylon Jennings and Willie Nelson, a poster for Bartles & Jaymes, and lunchboxes depicting the shows Hee Haw and Gunsmoke. In 2015, a church was holding services at the bar on one Sunday afternoon of every month.

In 2021, the establishment received national attention when Mick Jagger of the Rolling Stones posted an image on social media of himself drinking there.

== Gallery ==
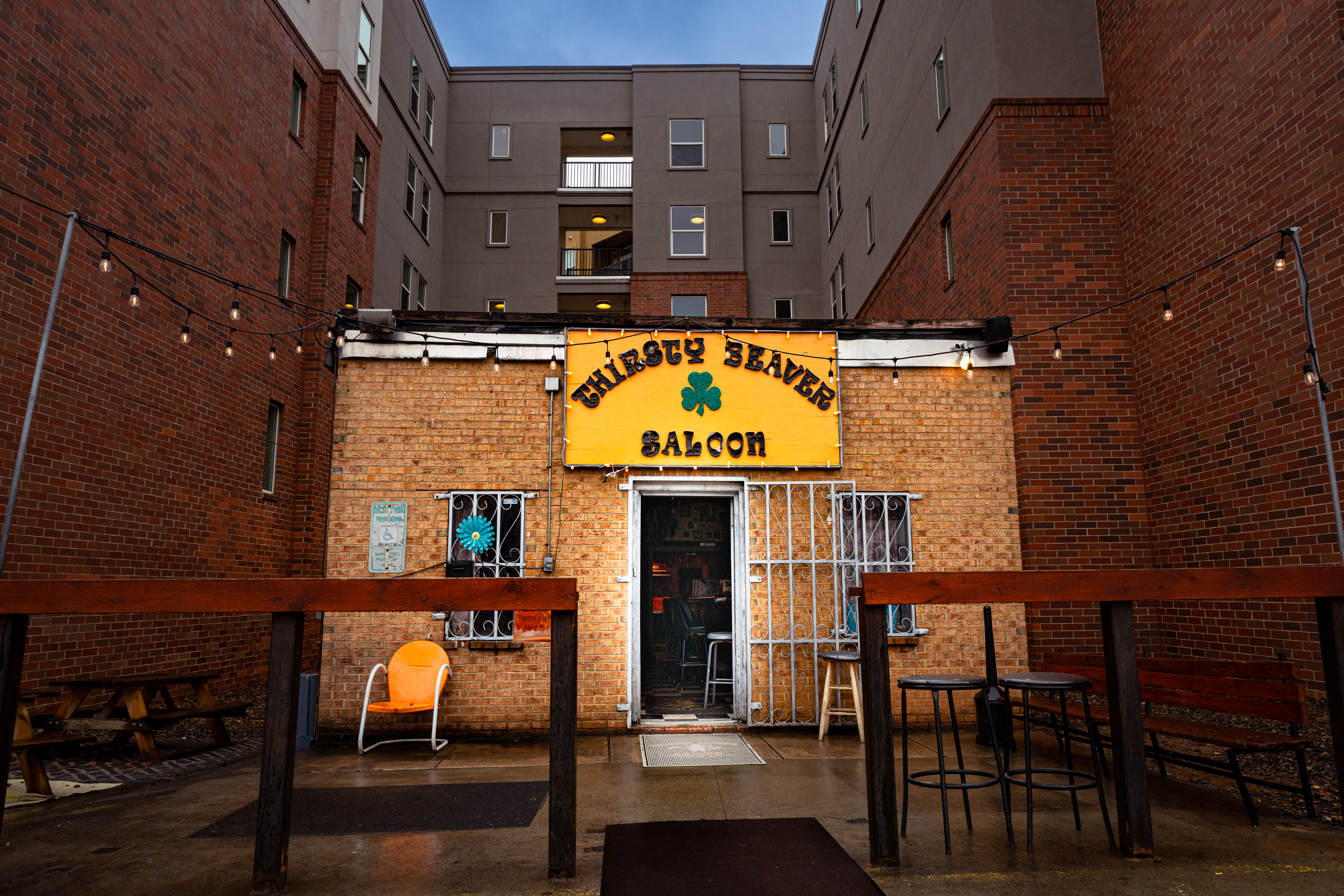
The bar in 2022

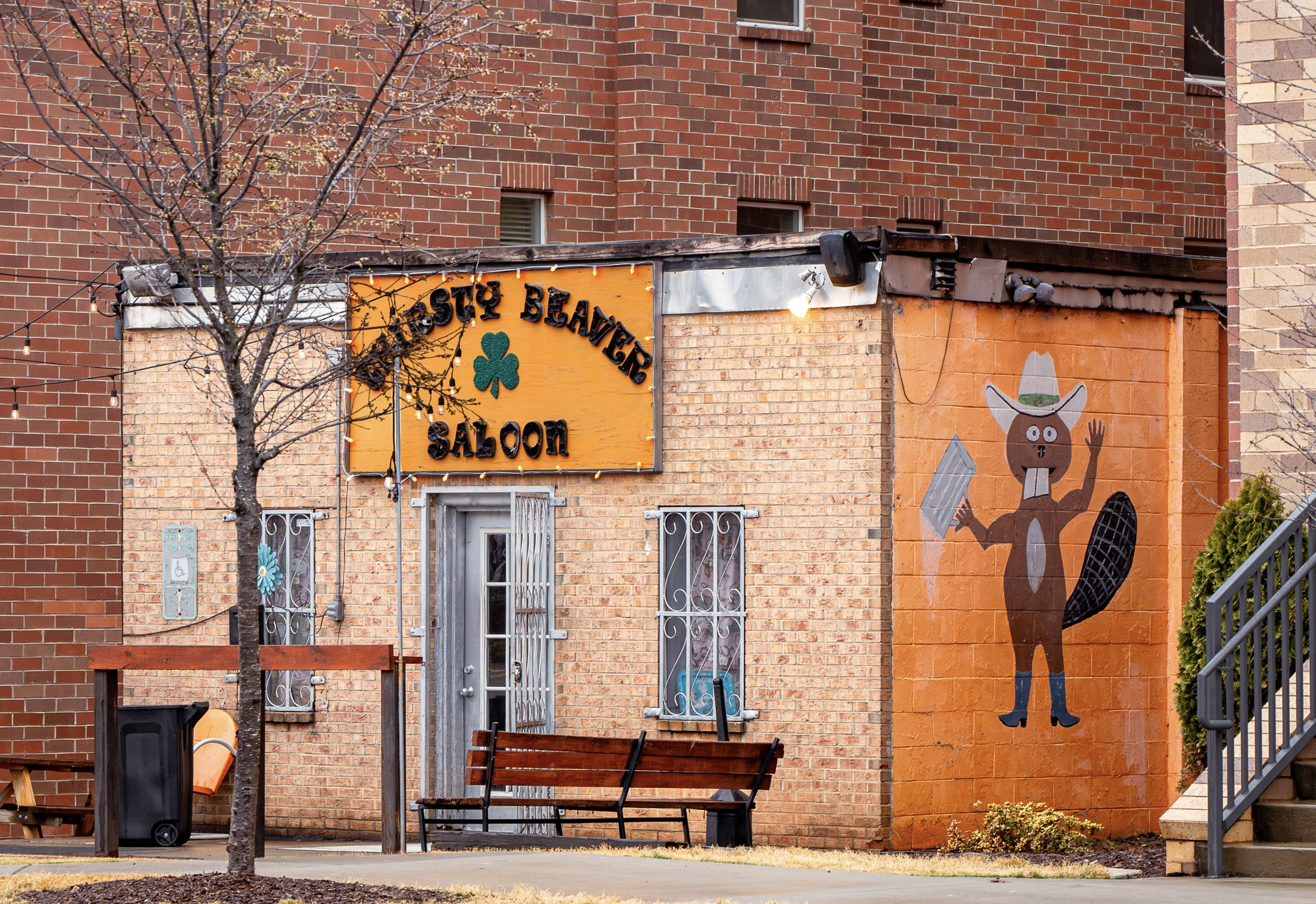
Image of the beaver mural

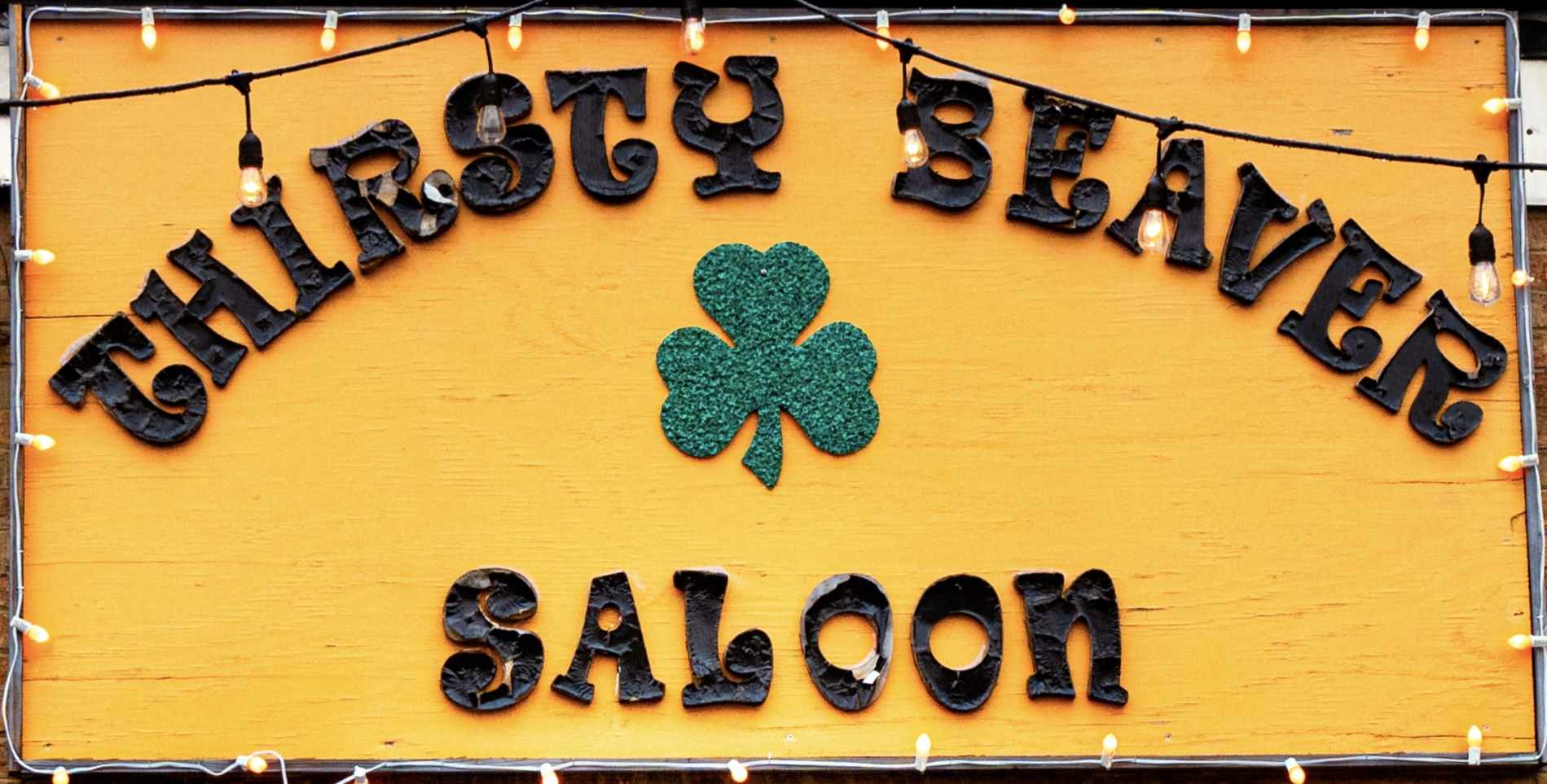
Sign on the front of the building

== See also ==
- Edith Macefield, owner of a similar home in Seattle, Washington
- List of dive bars
