= POBA =

- Founded: 2014
- Location: New York City
- Key people: Jennifer Cohen, Executive Director
- Website: http://www.poba.org

POBA is a non-profit, online arts community, launched in July, 2014 by The James Kirk Bernard Foundation (named after a young artist who died in 2010).

== Description ==
POBA's mission is to preserve, display, and provide resources for research, archiving, and appraising the creative legacies of 20th and 21st century artists who either died without their legacy being fully recognized, were not recognized for a specific medium, or whose work is not readily accessible elsewhere.

POBA offers membership to anyone who owns the rights to a deceased artist's legacy. Members can create portfolios on behalf of that artist to show the works in the appropriate digital format, for public display and private storage.

The name "POBA" derives from the Hindi word "phowa", which means the transformation of consciousness at death.

== Partners ==
POBA has partnered with such leading institutions and galleries as the American Ballet Theatre and The Berta Walker Gallery, and has partnerships with the Provincetown Art Association and Museum and Paddle8.

In January 2016, POBA launched Art Lives, an online project to digitize, curate, and display the work of artists of all genres lost to AIDS in the 1970s and 1980s, partnering with DIFFA (Design Industries Foundation Fighting AIDS), LifeBeat (Music Fights AIDS) and Visual AIDS for the initial portfolios. Featured artists include Sylvester (singer), Mel Cheren, artist and creator of West End Records, and Patrick Kelly (fashion designer).

== Artists ==
Founding artists' legacies include:

- Ben-Zion (1897–1987), a member, along with such painters as Mark Rothko and Adolph Gottlieb, of "The Ten" who exhibited their work together from 1935 to 1940
- Carol C. Carlisle (1924–2011), the Managing Editor of Popular Photography magazine for over 35 years, who amassed a personal collection more than 1,200 photos by then-unknown photographers who are now considered modern masters.
- Andrew Gold (1951-2011,) the singer, songwriter, musician and arranger, whose best known works include "Lonely Boy" and "Thank You for Being a Friend".
- Pete Ham (1947–1975) and Tom Evans (1947–1983), founding members and principal songwriters for the musical group Badfinger.
- Norman Mailer (1923–2007), the acclaimed writer and author, whose drawings were relatively unknown.
- Clark Tippet (1955–1992), a principal dancer for the American Ballet Theatre from 1976 to 1990, where he worked with such dancers as Mikhail Baryshnikov, Twyla Tharp, and David Parsons, and choreographer, creating numerous works for the ABT and other dance companies.
- George Tate (1920–1992), a photographer whose work captured mid-century California's bathing beauty and Muscle Beach culture.
- Jamie Bernard (1987–2010), a young writer and artist, whose tragic death prompted the creation of the James Kirk Bernard Foundation.
- Nancy Whorf (1930–2009), a noted Provincetown-based painter.
- Eli Waldron (1916–1980), a writer whose short stories were published in such literary journals and magazines such as The Kenyon Review, Collier's Weekly, and The Saturday Evening Post, a journalist whose articles appeared in such publications as Gourmet, Rolling Stone, Publishers Weekly, and The New Yorker, and a prolific artist who created a large body of drawings.
