= Chongqing nail house incident =

Property rights dispute in China

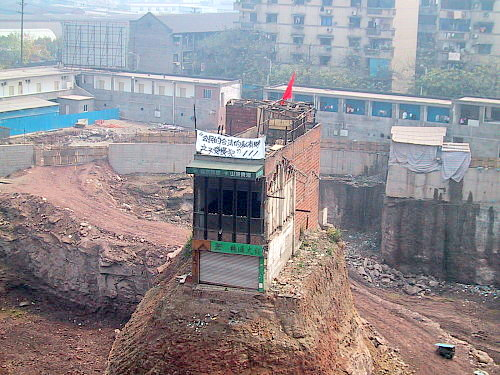
Picture of the house as it still stood in 2007.

The Chongqing nail house incident is one of the most famous nail house incidents in China.

Wu Ping (吴苹; born 1965/1966) owned a house that sat in the middle of a construction site for a new shopping mall in Chongqing called Zhengsheng Broadway. Of 281 families who were offered of a new house or financial compensation to move from the site in 2004, Wu was the only holdout.

In an attempt to force Ms. Wu to give up her house, the developer excavated the area around the house leaving it standing out 10 meters above the surrounding area, like a giant nail. Ms. Wu demanded twenty million yuan to move.

The developer applied to the Housing Management Bureau for relief, and the matter was referred to the Julongpu District Court. On 17 March 2007 the court ordered Ms. Wu to move within three days.

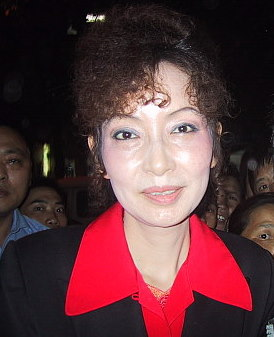
Wu Ping

On April 4, 2007, the house in central Chongqing was destroyed and Wu and her family received a one million yuan settlement plus a new apartment.
