= List of political officials who have tested positive for COVID-19 =

Since the outbreak of the COVID-19 pandemic, a total of 88 serving and former heads of state and 49 heads of government have tested positive for the disease, as well as their spouses, government members, members of legislatures, and other national and local officials. Some leaders are also suspected, without any official evidence, to have been infected with COVID-19.

== Confirmed positive ==
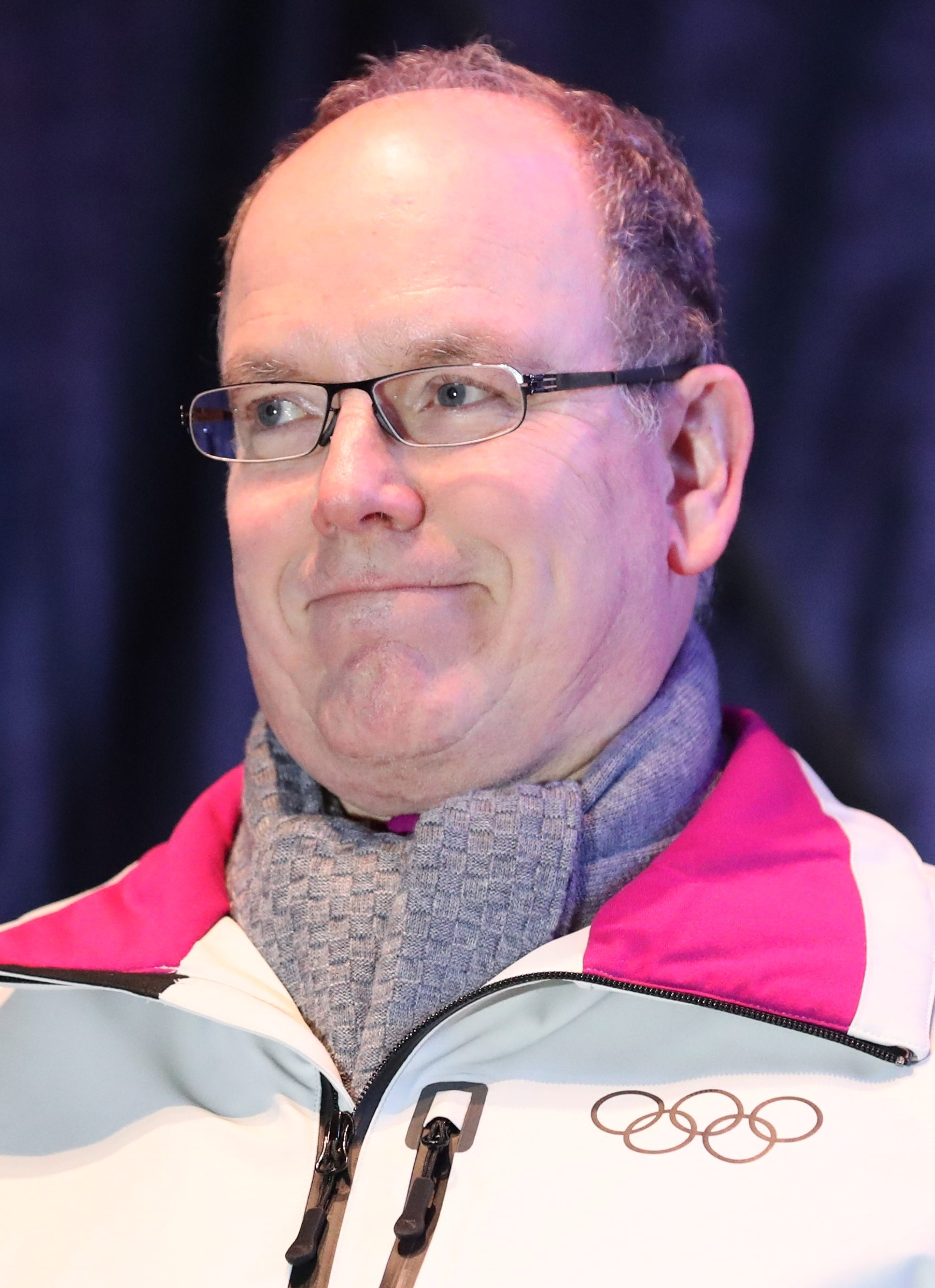
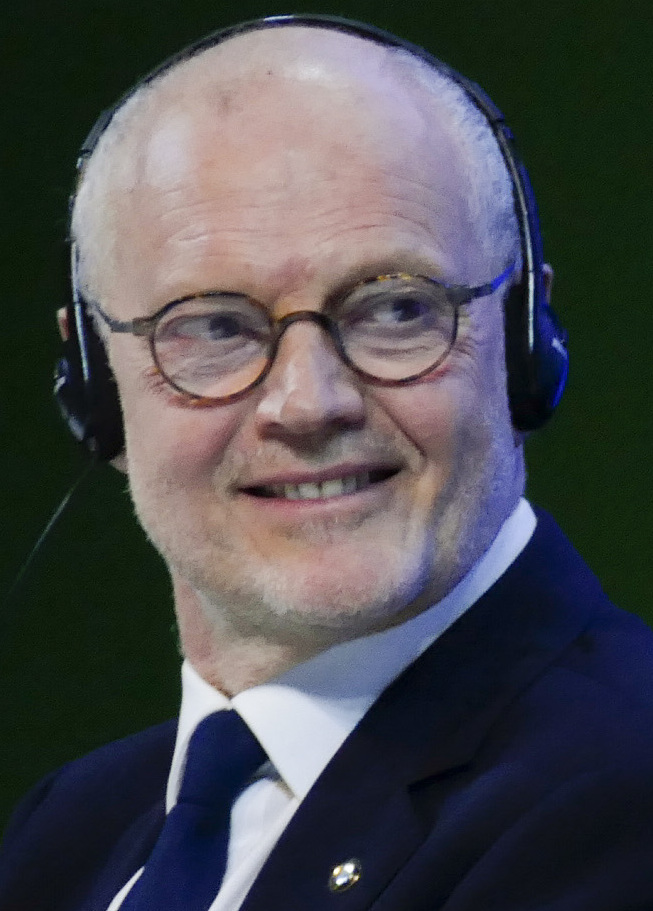
Prince Albert II (left) and Serge Telle (right), respectively head of state and head of government of Monaco, were the first sitting state leaders to test positive for COVID-19.

=== Heads of state ===
Country	Individual	Position at the time of diagnosis	Date reported (Note: Date of the most recent update(s) detailing the individual's condition. Dates on which the positive test was confirmed earlier are noted accordingly.)	Severity	Reported source of contraction	Ref.
Algeria	Abdelmadjid Tebboune	President	3 Nov 2020	Hospitalized; discharged	—N/a	
Antigua and Barbuda	Elizabeth II	Queen	20 Feb 2022	Positive and symptomatic	COVID-19 cluster at Windsor Castle	
Australia	Elizabeth II	Queen	20 Feb 2022	Positive and symptomatic	COVID-19 cluster at Windsor Castle	
Bahamas	Elizabeth II	Queen	20 Feb 2022	Positive and symptomatic	COVID-19 cluster at Windsor Castle	
Belize	Elizabeth II	Queen	20 Feb 2022	Positive and symptomatic	COVID-19 cluster at Windsor Castle	
Canada	Elizabeth II	Queen	20 Feb 2022	Positive and symptomatic	COVID-19 cluster at Windsor Castle	
Grenada	Elizabeth II	Queen	20 Feb 2022	Positive and symptomatic	COVID-19 cluster at Windsor Castle	
Jamaica	Elizabeth II	Queen	20 Feb 2022	Positive and symptomatic	COVID-19 cluster at Windsor Castle	
New Zealand	Elizabeth II	Queen	20 Feb 2022	Positive and symptomatic	COVID-19 cluster at Windsor Castle	
Papua New Guinea	Elizabeth II	Queen	20 Feb 2022	Positive and symptomatic	COVID-19 cluster at Windsor Castle	
Saint Kitts and Nevis	Elizabeth II	Queen	20 Feb 2022	Positive and symptomatic	COVID-19 cluster at Windsor Castle	
Saint Lucia	Elizabeth II	Queen	20 Feb 2022	Positive and symptomatic	COVID-19 cluster at Windsor Castle	
Saint Vincent and the Grenadines	Elizabeth II	Queen	20 Feb 2022	Positive and symptomatic	COVID-19 cluster at Windsor Castle	
Solomon Islands	Elizabeth II	Queen	20 Feb 2022	Positive and symptomatic	COVID-19 cluster at Windsor Castle	
Tuvalu	Elizabeth II	Queen	20 Feb 2022	Positive and symptomatic	COVID-19 cluster at Windsor Castle	
United Kingdom	Elizabeth II	Queen	20 Feb 2022	Positive and symptomatic	COVID-19 cluster at Windsor Castle	
Austria	Alexander Van der Bellen	President	19 Nov 2022	Positive and symptomatic	—N/a	
Belarus	Alexander Lukashenko	President	28 Jul 2020	Positive	—N/a	
Bolivia	Jeanine Áñez	President	9 Jul 2020	Positive	—N/a	
Burundi	Pierre Buyoya	Former president (1987–1993; 1996–2003)	18 Dec 2020	Deceased	Bamako, Mali	
Brazil	Jair Bolsonaro	President	7 Jul 2020	Positive	—N/a	
Brazil	Luiz Inácio Lula da Silva	Former president (2003–2011)	6 Jun 2022	Positive but asymptomatic	—N/a	
Denmark	Margrethe II	Queen	9 Feb 2022	Positive and symptomatic	—N/a	
Denmark	Margrethe II	Queen	21 Sep 2022	Positive	Contracted after returning from state funeral of Elizabeth II	
Ecuador	Guillermo Lasso	President	11 Mar 2023	Positive	—N/a	
Eswatini	Mswati III	King	20 Feb 2021 (Note: Mswati III stated that he tested positive in early January 2021.)	Positive	—N/a	
Finland	Sauli Niinistö	President	26 Apr 2022 (Note: Positive diagnosis confirmed on 19 April 2022.)	Hospitalized; discharged	—N/a	
France	Valéry Giscard d'Estaing	Former president (1974–1981)	2 Dec 2020	Deceased	—N/a	
France	Emmanuel Macron	President	17 Dec 2020	Positive and symptomatic	—N/a	
Germany	Frank-Walter Steinmeier	President	22 Mar 2022	Positive and symptomatic	—N/a	
Germany	Elke Büdenbender	Spouse of the president	22 Mar 2022	Positive and symptomatic	—N/a	
Greece	Constantine II	Former king (1964–1973)	9 Jan 2022	Hospitalized; discharged	—N/a	
Greece	Katerina Sakellaropoulou	President	13 Apr 2022	Positive and symptomatic	—N/a	
Guatemala	Alejandro Giammattei	President	18 Sep 2020	Positive and symptomatic	—N/a	
Honduras	Juan Orlando Hernández	President	17 Jun 2020	Positive and symptomatic	—N/a	
Honduras	Ana García Carías	First Lady	17 Jun 2020	Positive but asymptomatic	—N/a	
India	Pranab Mukherjee	Former president (2012–2017)	31 Aug 2020	Deceased	—N/a	
Ireland	Michael D. Higgins	President	4 Mar 2022	Positive and symptomatic	—N/a	
Ireland	Sabina Higgins	Spouse of the president	4 Mar 2022	Positive and symptomatic	—N/a	
Italy	Sergio Mattarella	President	10 Dec 2022	Positive and symptomatic	—N/a	
Ivory Coast	Alassane Ouattara	President	18 Aug 2021	Positive	—N/a	
Latvia	Egils Levits	President	14 Oct 2021	Positive	—N/a	
Luxembourg	Henri	Grand Duke	4 Jan 2022	Positive and symptomatic	—N/a	
Mali	Ibrahim Boubacar Keïta	Former president (2013–2020)	6 Jan 2021 (Note: Positive diagnosis confirmed on 20 December 2020, although it was not previously reported.)	Positive but asymptomatic	—N/a	
Mali	Keïta Aminata Maiga	Former first lady (2013–2020)	6 Jan 2021	Positive but asymptomatic	—N/a	
Mexico	Andrés Manuel López Obrador	President	25 Jan 2021	Positive and symptomatic	—N/a	
Mexico	Andrés Manuel López Obrador	President	10 Jan 2022	Positive and symptomatic	—N/a	
Mexico	Andrés Manuel López Obrador	President	23 Apr 2023	Positive	—N/a	
Monaco	Albert II	Sovereign Prince	19 Mar 2020	Positive	—N/a	
Monaco	Albert II	Sovereign Prince	13 Apr 2022	Positive but asymptomatic	—N/a	
Monaco	Albert II	Sovereign Prince	25 Jan 2023	Positive but asymptomatic	—N/a	
Morocco	Mohammed VI	King	17 Jun 2022	Positive but asymptomatic	Likely contracted during private visit to France	
Netherlands	Beatrix	Former queen (1980–2013)	4 Dec 2021	Positive and symptomatic	—N/a	
Norway	Harald V	King	22 Mar 2022	Positive and symptomatic	—N/a	
Norway	Harald V	King	22 Oct 2023	Positive and symptomatic	—N/a	
Pakistan	Arif Alvi	President	29 Mar 2021	Positive	—N/a	
Pakistan	Arif Alvi	President	6 Jan 2022	Positive and symptomatic	—N/a	
Pakistan	Asif Ali Zardari	Former president (2008–2013)	28 Jul 2022	Positive and symptomatic	—N/a	
Pakistan	Asif Ali Zardari	President	5 Apr 2025 (Note: Positive diagnosis confirmed on 2 April 2025.)	Hospitalized; discharged	—N/a	
Philippines	Bongbong Marcos	President	8 Jul 2022	Positive and symptomatic	—N/a	
Philippines	Bongbong Marcos	President	5 Dec 2023	Positive	—N/a	
Poland	Andrzej Duda	President	24 Oct 2020	Positive	—N/a	
Poland	Andrzej Duda	President	5 Jan 2022	Positive	—N/a	
Portugal	Marcelo Rebelo de Sousa	President	11 Jan 2021	Positive but asymptomatic	Contact with infected advisor	
Somalia	Hassan Sheikh Mohamud	President	24 Jun 2022	Positive but asymptomatic	Contracted after returning from the United Arab Emirates	
South Africa	Cyril Ramaphosa	President	12 Dec 2021	Positive and symptomatic	—N/a	
Spain	Felipe VI	King	9 Feb 2022	Positive and symptomatic	—N/a	
Suriname	Chan Santokhi	President	14 Jan 2021	Positive and symptomatic	—N/a	
Sweden	Carl XVI Gustaf	King	4 Jan 2022	Positive and symptomatic	—N/a	
Sweden	Silvia	Queen consort	4 Jan 2022	Positive and symptomatic	—N/a	
Syria	Bashar al-Assad	President	8 Mar 2021	Positive and symptomatic	—N/a	
Syria	Asma al-Assad	First Lady	8 Mar 2021	Positive and symptomatic	—N/a	
Thailand	Vajiralongkorn	King	17 Dec 2022	Positive and symptomatic	—N/a	
Thailand	Suthida	Queen consort	17 Dec 2022	Positive and symptomatic	—N/a	
Turkey	Recep Tayyip Erdoğan	President	5 Feb 2022	Positive and symptomatic	—N/a	
Turkey	Emine Erdoğan	First Lady	5 Feb 2022	Positive	—N/a	
Uganda	Yoweri Museveni	President	7 Jun 2023	Positive and symptomatic	—N/a	
Ukraine	Olena Zelenska	First Lady	16 Jun 2020	Hospitalized; discharged	—N/a	
Ukraine	Volodymyr Zelenskyy	President	9 Nov 2020	Positive	—N/a	
United States	Donald Trump	President	2 Oct 2020	Hospitalized; discharged	White House COVID-19 outbreak	
United States	Melania Trump	First Lady	2 Oct 2020	Positive and symptomatic	White House COVID-19 outbreak	
United States	Barack Obama	Former president (2009–2017)	13 Mar 2022	Positive and symptomatic	—N/a	
United States	Hillary Clinton	Former first lady (1993–2001)	22 Mar 2022	Positive and symptomatic	—N/a	
United States	Joe Biden	President	21 Jul 2022	Positive and symptomatic	—N/a	
United States	Joe Biden	President	30 Jul 2022	Positive	—N/a	
United States	Bill Clinton	Former president (1993–2001)	30 Nov 2022	Positive and symptomatic	—N/a	
United States	Jill Biden	First Lady	5 Sep 2023	Positive and symptomatic	—N/a	
United States	Joe Biden	President	17 Jul 2024	Positive and symptomatic	—N/a	

=== Heads of government ===
Country	Individual	Position at the time of diagnosis	Date reported	Severity	Reported source of contraction	Ref.
Antigua and Barbuda	Gaston Browne	Prime Minister	9 Apr 2022	Positive	—N/a	
Australia	Scott Morrison	Prime Minister	1 Mar 2022	Positive and symptomatic	—N/a	
Australia	Anthony Albanese	Prime Minister	5 Dec 2022	Positive	—N/a	
Austria	Karl Nehammer	Chancellor	7 Jan 2022	Positive but asymptomatic	Contact with a security official	
Barbados	Mia Mottley	Prime Minister	20 Jun 2022	Positive	—N/a	
Belarus	Vyacheslav Kebich	Former prime minister (1991–1994)	9 Dec 2020 (Note: Diagnosed on 26 November 2020.)	Deceased	—N/a	
Belgium	Sophie Wilmès	Former prime minister (2019–2020)	22 Oct 2020	Hospitalized; discharged	—N/a	
Belize	Johnny Briceño	Prime Minister	1 Feb 2022	Positive	—N/a	
Cambodia	Hun Sen	Prime Minister	14 Nov 2022	Positive	—N/a	
Canada	Sophie Grégoire Trudeau	Spouse of the Prime Minister	13 Mar 2020	Positive and symptomatic	Contracted after returning from London	
Canada	Justin Trudeau	Prime Minister	31 Jan 2022	Positive but asymptomatic	—N/a	
Canada	Justin Trudeau	Prime Minister	13 Jun 2022	Positive	—N/a	
China; Hong Kong	John Lee Ka-chiu	Chief Executive	21 Nov 2022	Positive	—N/a	
Eswatini	Ambrose Mandvulo Dlamini	Prime Minister	14 Dec 2020 (Note: Positive diagnosis announced on 15 November 2020.)	Deceased	—N/a	
Finland	Sanna Marin	Prime Minister	8 Jun 2022	Positive and symptomatic	—N/a	
France	Jean Castex	Prime Minister	22 Nov 2021	Positive and symptomatic	Contact with one of his daughters	
France; French Polynesia	Édouard Fritch	President	11 Oct 2020	Positive and symptomatic	Contracted after returning from Paris	
Germany	Olaf Scholz	Chancellor	26 Sep 2022	Positive and symptomatic	—N/a	
Germany	Olaf Scholz	Chancellor	18 Sep 2023	Positive and symptomatic	—N/a	
Greece	Kyriakos Mitsotakis	Prime Minister	14 Mar 2022	Positive	—N/a	
Gibraltar	Fabian Picardo	Chief Minister	1 Oct 2021	Positive but asymptomatic	Tested positive after returning from the United Kingdom	
Guinea-Bissau	Nuno Gomes Nabiam	Prime Minister	29 Apr 2020	Positive	—N/a	
Ireland	Micheál Martin	Taoiseach	16 Mar 2022	Positive	—N/a	
Israel	Benjamin Netanyahu	Former prime minister (1996–1999; 2009–2021)	9 Mar 2022	Positive	—N/a	
Israel	Naftali Bennett	Prime Minister	28 Mar 2022	Positive	—N/a	
Italy	Mario Draghi	Prime Minister	18 Apr 2022	Positive but asymptomatic	—N/a	
Japan	Fumio Kishida	Prime Minister	21 Aug 2022	Positive and symptomatic	—N/a	
Libya	Mahmoud Jibril	Former prime minister of the National Transitional Council (2011)	5 Apr 2020	Deceased	—N/a	
Monaco	Serge Telle	Minister of State	16 Mar 2020	Positive and symptomatic	—N/a	
Morocco	Abdelilah Benkirane	Former prime minister (2011–2017)	20 Jan 2022	Hospitalized; discharged	—N/a	
Morocco	Aziz Akhannouch	Prime Minister	21 Nov 2022	Positive	—N/a	
New Zealand	Clarke Gayford	Prime Minister's partner	8 May 2022	Positive and symptomatic	—N/a	
New Zealand	Jacinda Ardern	Prime Minister	14 May 2022	Positive and symptomatic	—N/a	
Pakistan	Imran Khan	Prime Minister	20 Mar 2021	Positive	—N/a	
Pakistan	Shehbaz Sharif	Prime Minister	15 Nov 2022	Positive	Contracted after returning from London to meet with former prime minister Nawaz Sharif	
Papua New Guinea	James Marape	Prime Minister	6 Feb 2022	Positive	—N/a	
Portugal	António Costa	Prime Minister	1 Feb 2022	Positive but asymptomatic	—N/a	
Russia	Mikhail Mishustin	Prime Minister	30 Apr 2020	Hospitalized; discharged	—N/a	
Saint Lucia	Philip J. Pierre	Prime Minister	9 Feb 2022	Positive but asymptomatic	—N/a	
Saint Vincent and the Grenadines	Ralph Gonsalves	Prime Minister	16 Jun 2022	Positive	—N/a	
Singapore	Lee Hsien Loong	Prime Minister	22 May 2023	Positive	—N/a	
Singapore	Lawrence Wong	Prime Minister	3 Dec 2024	Positive and symptomatic	—N/a	
Slovenia	Janez Janša	Prime Minister	9 Feb 2022	Positive and symptomatic	Contact with his two children	
Spain	Pedro Sánchez	Prime Minister	25 Sep 2022	Positive	—N/a	
Spain	Pedro Sánchez	Prime Minister	7 Sep 2023	Positive	—N/a	
Spain	Juan Jesús Vivas	Mayor-President of Ceuta	10 Jan 2022	Positive and symptomatic	—N/a	
Sweden	Magdalena Andersson	Prime Minister	14 Jan 2022	Positive	—N/a	
Tonga	Siaosi Sovaleni	Prime Minister	12 Mar 2022	Positive and symptomatic	—N/a	
United Kingdom	Boris Johnson	Prime Minister	5 Apr 2020	Hospitalized; discharged	—N/a	

=== Members of governments and cabinets ===
Country	Individual	Position at the time of diagnosis	Date reported	Severity	Reported source of contraction	Ref.
Brazil	Hamilton Mourão	Vice President	28 Dec 2020	Positive	—N/a	
China; Hong Kong	Paul Chan Mo-po	Financial Secretary	27 Oct 2022	Positive	Saudi Arabia	
France	Jean-Yves Le Drian	Minister for Europe and Foreign Affairs	15 Mar 2022	Positive	—N/a	
Gambia	Isatou Touray	Vice President	29 Jul 2020	Positive	—N/a	
Ghana	Kwaku Agyemang-Manu	Minister for Health	14 Jun 2020	Positive	—N/a	
Guyana	Bharrat Jagdeo	Vice President	28 Jul 2022	Positive but asymptomatic	—N/a	
Hungary	Judit Varga	Minister of Justice	20 Oct 2020	Positive and symptomatic	—N/a	
India	Venkaiah Naidu	Vice President	29 Sep 2020	Positive	—N/a	
India	Venkaiah Naidu	Vice President	23 Jan 2022	Positive	—N/a	
Iran	Iraj Harirchi	Deputy Minister of Health	25 Feb 2020	Positive and symptomatic	—N/a	
Iran	Masoumeh Ebtekar	Vice President for Women and Family Affairs	28 Feb 2020	Positive and symptomatic	—N/a	
Israel	Yair Lapid	Alternate Prime Minister and Minister of Foreign Affairs	10 Jan 2022	Positive	—N/a	
Italy	Luciana Lamorgese	Minister of the Interior	7 Dec 2020	Positive but asymptomatic	—N/a	
Ivory Coast	Hamed Bakayoko	Minister of Defense	6 Apr 2020	Positive but asymptomatic	—N/a	
Japan	Yoshimasa Hayashi	Minister for Foreign Affairs	1 Jun 2022	Positive and symptomatic	—N/a	
Morocco	Abdelkader Aamara	Minister of Transport and Logistics	14 Mar 2020	Positive and symptomatic	Tested positive after returning from Europe	
Morocco	Fatima Ezzahra El Mansouri	Minister of National Territory Planning, Land Planning, Housing and City Policy	23 May 2022	Positive	—N/a	
Somaliland	Abdirahman Saylici	Vice President	16 Mar 2021	Positive	—N/a	
South Korea	Kim Boo-kyum	Prime Minister (Note: The President of South Korea is the combined head of state and head of government.)	3 Mar 2022	Positive and symptomatic	—N/a	
South Sudan	Riek Machar	First Vice President	19 May 2020	Positive	—N/a	
South Sudan	Angelina Teny	Minister of Defence and Veterans Affairs	19 May 2020	Positive	—N/a	
Switzerland	Ignazio Cassis	Federal Councillor, President of the Swiss Confederation	17 Feb 2022	Positive but asymptomatic	—N/a	
Switzerland	Alain Berset	Federal Councillor	9 Mar 2022	Positive and symptomatic	—N/a	
Switzerland	Guy Parmelin	Federal Councillor	12 Mar 2022	Positive and symptomatic	—N/a	
Switzerland	Ueli Maurer	Federal Councillor	12 Jul 2022	Positive	—N/a	
United Kingdom	Liz Truss	Secretary of State for Foreign, Commonwealth and Development Affairs	31 Jan 2022	Positive	Attended a meeting of the House of Commons	
United States	Kamala Harris	Vice President	26 Apr 2022	Positive but asymptomatic	—N/a	
United States	Antony Blinken	Secretary of State	4 May 2022	Positive and symptomatic	—N/a	

=== Members of legislatures ===
Country	Individual	Position at the time of diagnosis	Date reported	Severity	Reported source of contraction	Ref.
Iran	Fatemeh Rahbar	Member-elect of the Islamic Consultative Assembly for Tehran, Rey, Shemiranat, Eslamshahr and Pardis	7 Mar 2020	Deceased	—N/a	
United States	Pramila Jayapal	Member of the House of Representatives from Washington's 7th congressional district	12 Jan 2021	Positive	Contracted after sheltering at the U.S. Capitol during the January 6 attack	
United States	Luke Letlow	Member-elect of the House of Representatives from Louisiana's 5th congressional district	29 Dec 2020	Deceased	—N/a	
United States	Bonnie Watson Coleman	Member of the House of Representatives from New Jersey's 12th congressional district	12 Jan 2021	Positive and symptomatic	Contracted after sheltering at the U.S. Capitol during the January 6 attack	
United States	Ron Wright	Member of the House of Representatives from Texas's 6th congressional district	8 Feb 2021	Deceased	—N/a	

=== Other ===
Country	Individual	Position at the time of diagnosis	Date reported	Severity	Reported source of contraction	Ref.
Australia	David Hurley	Governor-General	9 Jan 2022	Positive and symptomatic	—N/a	
Canada	Mary Simon	Governor General	9 Feb 2022	Positive and symptomatic	—N/a	
Indonesia	Ahmad Riza Patria	Vice Governor of Jakarta	30 Nov 2020	Positive	Contact with a staff member	
Indonesia	Gibran Rakabuming Raka	Mayor of Surakarta; son of President Joko Widodo	15 Jul 2021	Positive but asymptomatic	—N/a	
Indonesia	Gibran Rakabuming Raka	Mayor of Surakarta; son of President Joko Widodo	7 Mar 2022	Positive and symptomatic	—N/a	
Indonesia	Gibran Rakabuming Raka	Mayor of Surakarta; son of President Joko Widodo	19 Aug 2022	Positive but asymptomatic	—N/a	
Iran	Hadi Khosroshahi	Former ambassador to the Holy See	27 Feb 2020	Deceased	—N/a	
Iran	Mohammad Mirmohammadi	Member of the Expediency Discernment Council	2 Mar 2020	Deceased	—N/a	
Iran	Ahmad Toyserkani Ravari	Advisor to Ebrahim Raisi	3 Mar 2020	Deceased	—N/a	
Iran	Hossein Sheikholeslam	Former advisor to foreign minister Mohammad Javad Zarif	5 Mar 2020	Deceased	—N/a	
Japan	Princess Yōko of Mikasa	Member of the Imperial House of Japan	23 Feb 2022	Hospitalized; discharged	—N/a	
Japan	Yuriko, Princess Mikasa	Member of the Imperial House of Japan by marriage	14 Jul 2022	Hospitalized; discharged	—N/a	
Japan	Aiko, Princess Toshi	Daughter of Emperor Naruhito and Empress Masako	2 Oct 2025	Positive and symptomatic	—N/a	
Jordan	Hussein	Crown Prince of Jordan	27 Sep 2021	Positive and symptomatic	—N/a	
Luxembourg	Guillaume	Hereditary Grand Duke of Luxembourg	11 Jan 2022	Positive but asymptomatic	—N/a	
Morocco	Prince Moulay Rachid	Younger brother of King Mohammed VI and second in line to the throne	14 Oct 2022	Positive	—N/a	
Palestine	Saeb Erekat	Secretary General of the Executive Committee of the Palestine Liberation Organization	10 Nov 2020	Deceased	—N/a	
Saudi Arabia	Prince Faisal bin Bandar Al Saud	Governor of Riyadh Province	8 Apr 2020	Hospitalized; discharged	—N/a	
Spain	Queen Sofía	Mother of King Felipe VI	23 May 2022	Positive	—N/a	
South Africa	Victor Thulare III	King of the Bapedi	7 Jan 2021	Deceased	—N/a	
South Africa	Goodwill Zwelithini	King of the Zulu Nation	13 Mar 2021	Deceased	—N/a	
Sweden	Victoria	Crown Princess of Sweden	11 Mar 2021	Positive and symptomatic	—N/a	
Sweden	Prince Daniel, Duke of Västergötland	Husband of Crown Princess Victoria	11 Mar 2021	Positive and symptomatic	—N/a	
United Kingdom	Charles	Prince of Wales and heir apparent to the throne	25 Mar 2020	Positive and symptomatic	—N/a	
United Kingdom	Charles	Prince of Wales and heir apparent to the throne	10 Feb 2022	Positive	COVID-19 cluster at Windsor Castle	
United Kingdom	Prince William, Duke of Cambridge	Second in line to the throne	1 Nov 2020	"Treated by palace doctors"	—N/a	

== Suspected ==
The following leaders were speculated to have been infected with COVID-19 in various news sources in spite of officially-disseminated information.

Country	Individual	Position	Date reported	Details	Status	Ref.
Burundi	Pierre Nkurunziza	President	9 Jun 2020	Nkurunziza died in office in June 2020, with his cause of death officially given as a heart attack. Opposition politicians and other Burundian sources speculated that he had died of COVID-19 and that the government "hid the actual cause of death"; his wife had previously been flown to Kenya for medical treatment, reportedly of the disease.	Deceased	
North Korea	Kim Jong Un	Supreme Leader	11 Aug 2022	Kim suffered a "fever" during the COVID-19 pandemic in North Korea, according to a statement by his sister Kim Yo Jong, which news sources took to mean as a suggestion that he had COVID-19.	Unknown	
Russia	Ramzan Kadyrov	Head of the Chechen Republic	21 May 2020	Russian media outlets reported that Kadyrov had been flown to a hospital in Moscow in May 2020, for an illness suspected to be COVID-19. On 27 May, Kadyrov appeared in a televised interview with a catheter appearing to be visible on his right hand, saying that he felt "absolutely healthy".	Unknown	
Spain	Juan Carlos I	Former king (1975–2014)	6 Feb 2022	El Mundo reported that Juan Carlos had contracted COVID-19 during his period of self-imposed exile in the United Arab Emirates in 2021. A test later that year returned negative, despite a prior meeting with tennis player Rafael Nadal, who himself tested positive.	Negative (as of 20 Dec 2021)	
Tanzania	John Magufuli	President	17 Mar 2021	Magufuli died in office in March 2021 after not appearing in public for several weeks. Vice President Samia Suluhu Hassan, who succeeded him as president, said that he had died from heart complications, although opposition politicians and members of the public had speculated that he had contracted COVID-19.	Deceased	
