= Veterans' affairs =

Public policy area

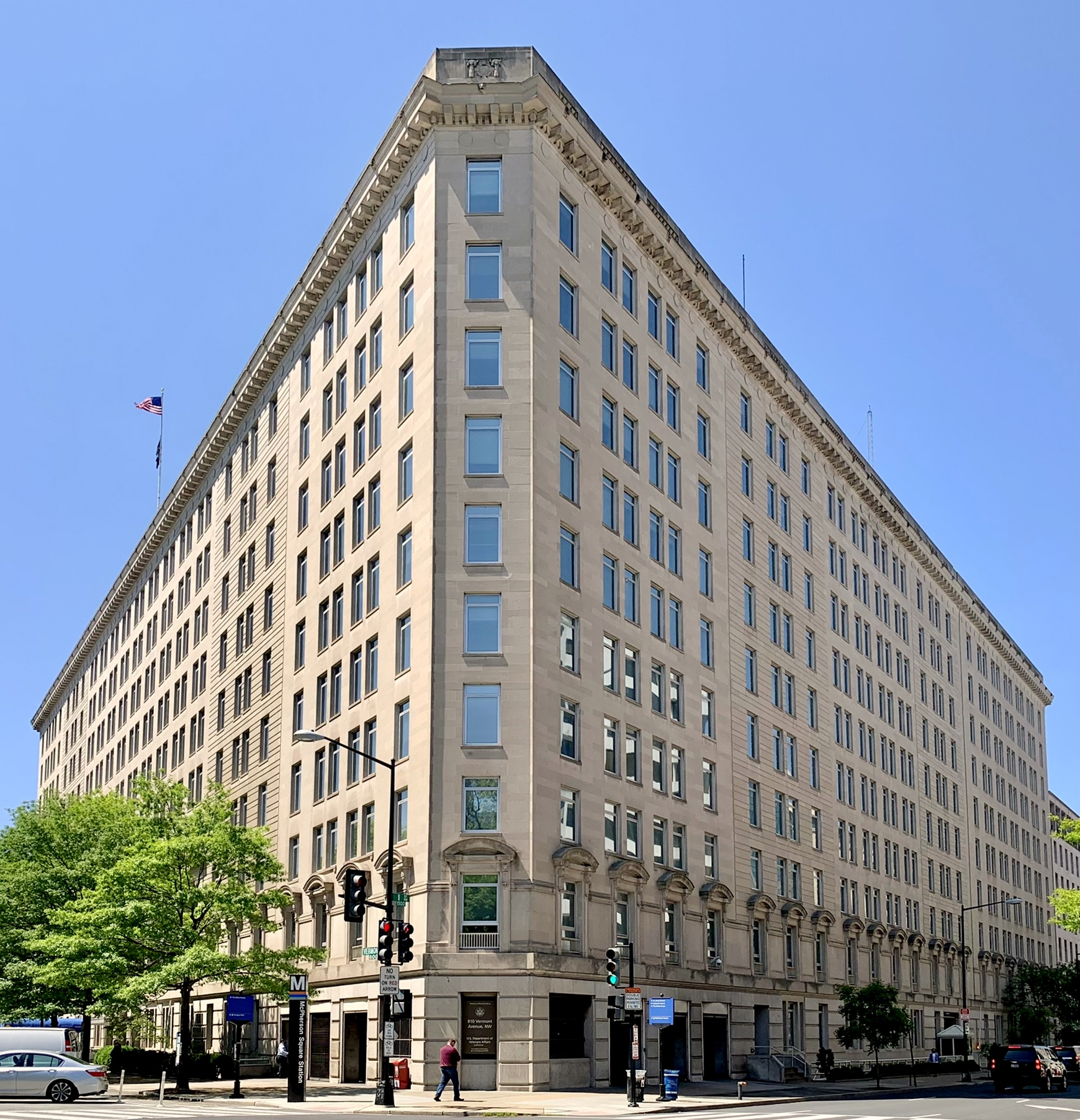
United States Department of Veterans Affairs in Washington, D.C.

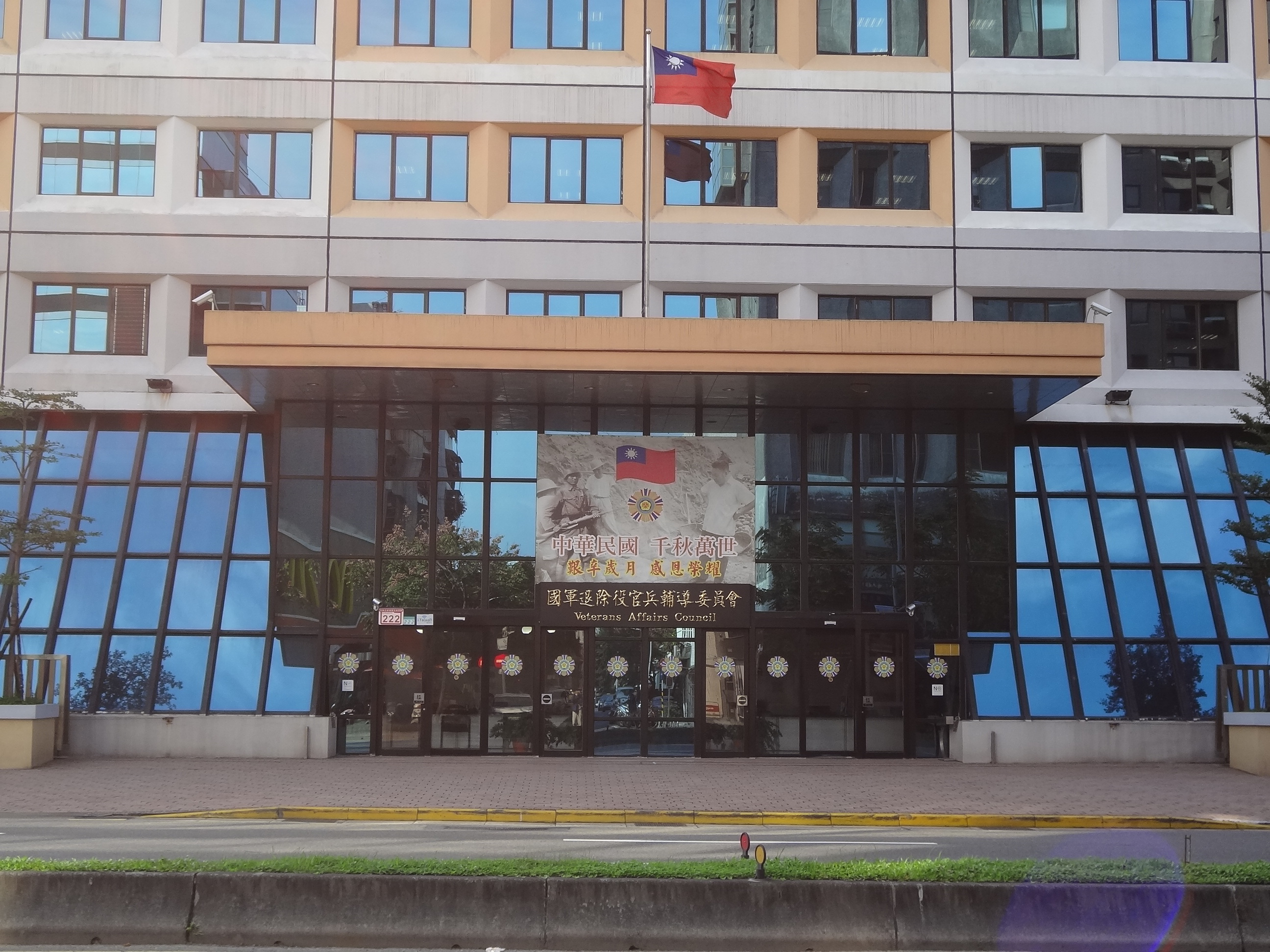
Front gate of the Veterans Affairs Council in Taiwan

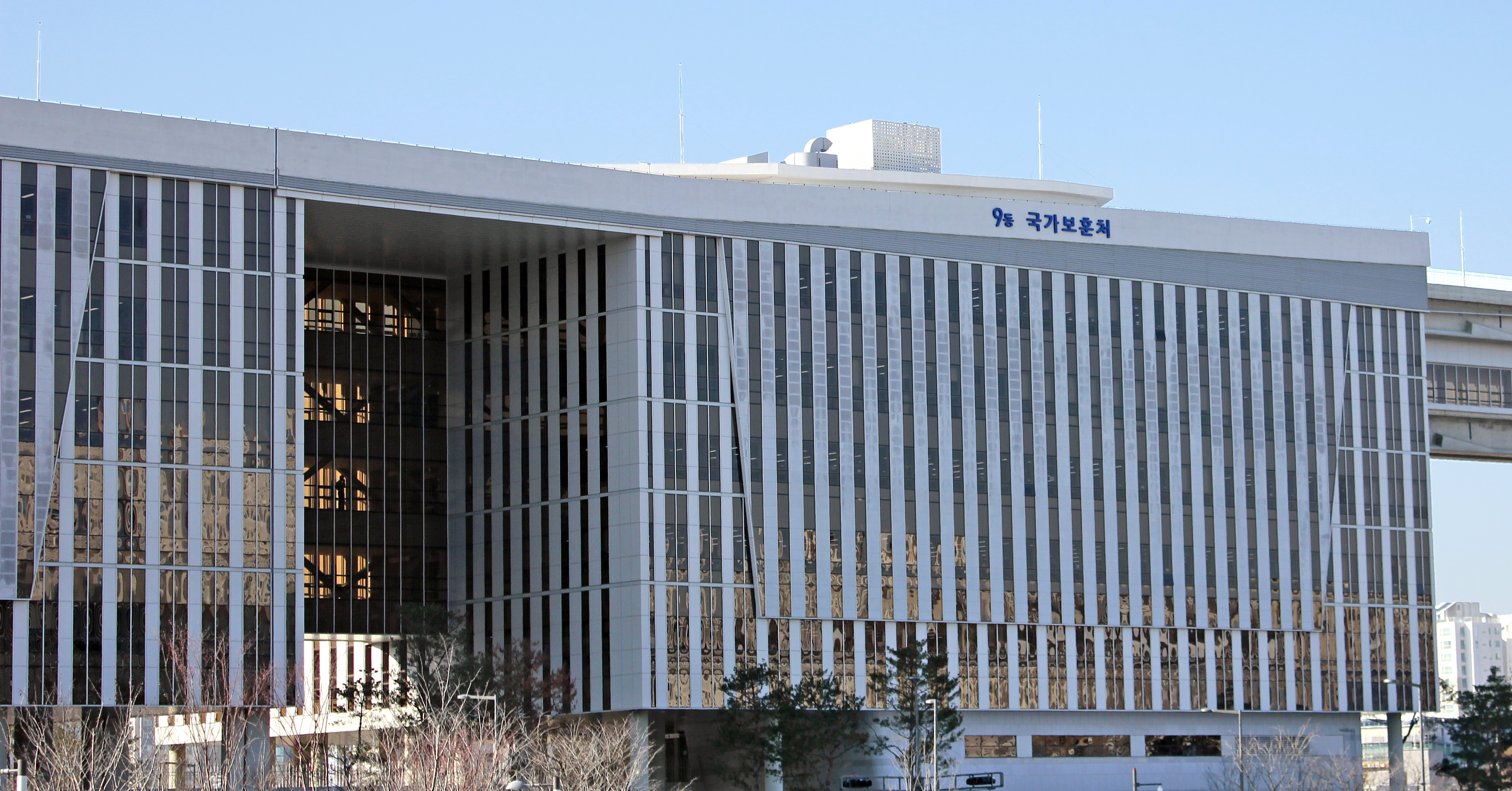
The Ministry of Patriots and Veterans Affairs, South Korea

Veterans' affairs is an area of public policy concerned with relations between a government and its communities of military veterans. Some jurisdictions have a designated government agency or department, a Department of Veterans' Affairs, Ministry of Veterans' Affairs, Department of Veterans Services, or the like, which oversees issues relating to veterans' affairs. These departments provide a variety of services for veterans.

== Functions ==
The particular services provided can vary by jurisdiction, but can include things such as:

- Resolving issues regarding compensation due following service
- Provision of military pensions
- Assistance with housing
- Assistance obtaining post-service employment
- Provision of treatment for service-related injuries
- Arranging for burial in cemeteries designated for veterans

In a survey of benefits and services offered to Veterans in four English-speaking countries, Veterans Affairs Canada noted that "[w]hile each country's suite of programs is very different, there is general consistency in the services and benefits available to support a Veteran's re-establishment".

== Examples ==
Departments for Veteran Affairs in country or state jurisdictions include:

- United States Department of Veterans Affairs (departments of this type in individual US states are independent of the federal entity)
  - Arizona Department of Veterans' Services
  - Florida Department of Veterans Affairs
  - Illinois Department of Veterans' Affairs
  - Louisiana Department of Veterans Affairs
  - Michigan Department of Military and Veterans Affairs
  - New Jersey Department of Veterans Affairs
  - Ohio Department of Veterans Services
  - Oklahoma Department of Veterans Affairs
  - Oregon Department of Veterans' Affairs
  - Tennessee Department of Veterans Services
  - West Virginia Department of Veterans Assistance
  - Wisconsin Department of Veterans Affairs
- Department of Veterans' Affairs, Australia
- Veterans Affairs Canada, Canada
- Veterans Affairs Council of Taiwan
- Ministry of Veterans Affairs, China
- Ministry of Croatian Veterans, Croatia
- Ministry of Patriots and Veterans Affairs, South Korea
- Ministry of Defence and Veterans Affairs (South Sudan)
- Service Personnel and Veterans Agency, United Kingdom

== See also ==
- Healthcare
