= Office of Administrative Law =

Office of Administrative Law may refer to:

- California Office of Administrative Law
- New Jersey Office of Administrative Law
