= Gambling in New Jersey =

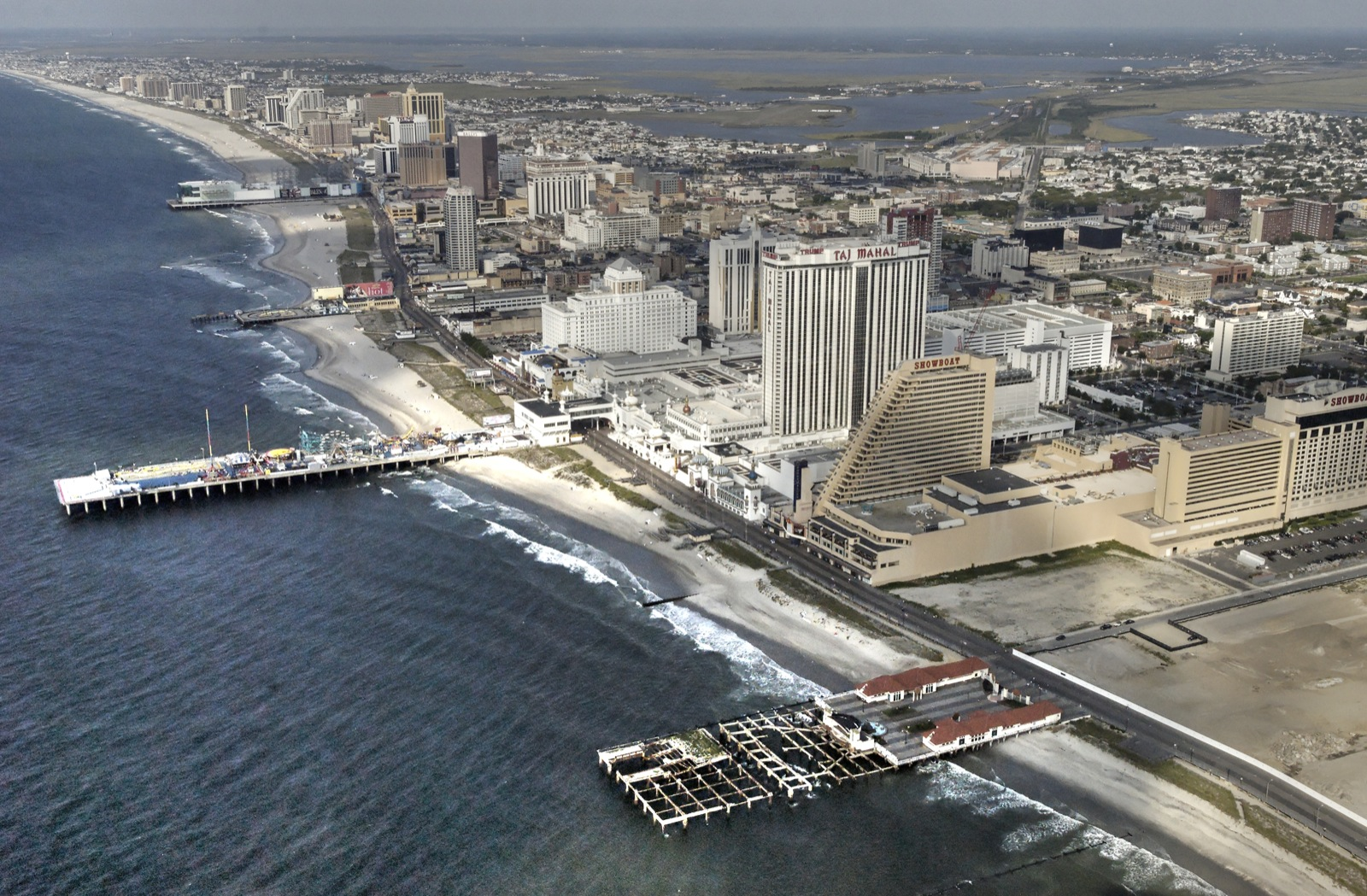
The uptown section of Atlantic City, New Jersey, showing Showboat Atlantic City and Hard Rock Hotel and Casino Atlantic City (then known as Taj Majal)

Gambling in New Jersey includes casino gambling in Atlantic City, the New Jersey Lottery, horse racing, off-track betting, charity gambling, amusement games, and social gambling. New Jersey's gambling laws are among the least restrictive in the United States. In 2013, the state began to allow in-state online gambling. Five years later in 2018, the state won a lawsuit that dismantled Nevada's monopoly on legal sports betting.

== History ==
=== Early era ===
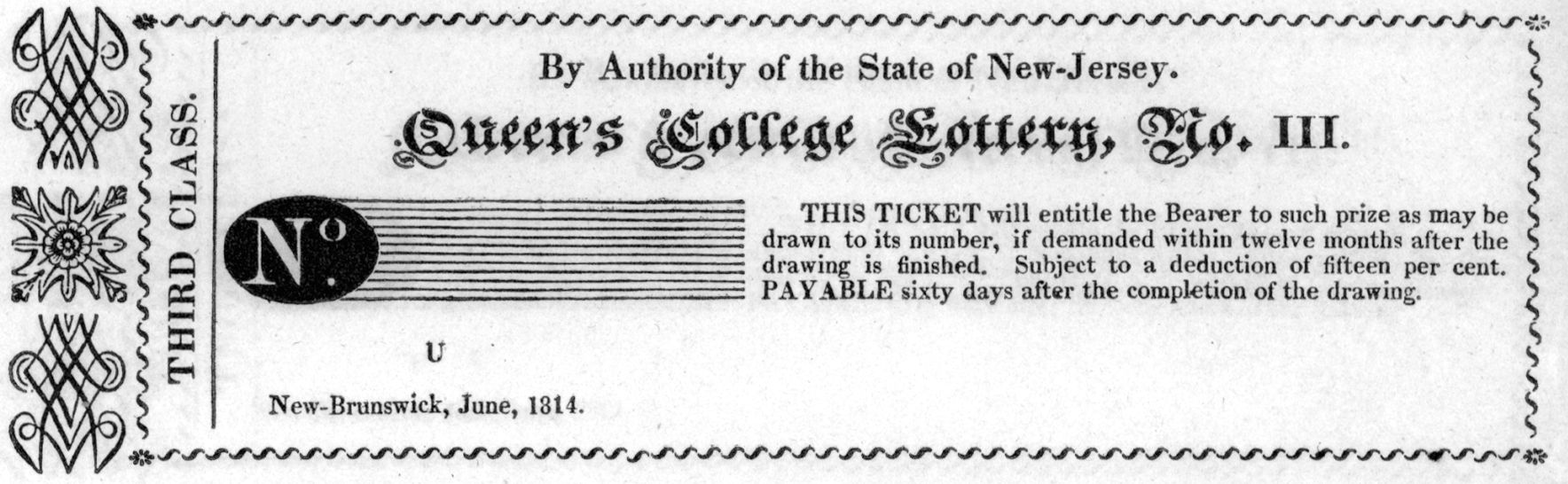
Early New Jersey lottery ticket used to help finance the construction of Queen's College, now Rutgers University, in New Brunswick

Gambling has a long legacy in New Jersey, with the state historically being more permissive of gambling than most other states. Until they were banned in 1844, lotteries were common in New Jersey. They were used to help pay for the military during the French and Indian War and American Revolution, and help finance the construction of Queen's College (now Rutgers University) and the College of New Jersey (now Princeton University).

Freehold Raceway was the oldest racetrack in the United States, with horse racing having taken place there informally since the 1830s. The Monmouth County Agricultural Society was formed on December 17, 1853, and in 1854 they began holding an annual fair with harness racing at Freehold Raceway. Monmouth Park Racetrack opened as a venue for thoroughbred racing in 1870. In 1894, the New Jersey Legislature banned parimutuel gambling, and in 1897 the voters of New Jersey approved a referendum which amended the state constitution to ban all gambling (or possibly all commercial gambling).

=== Expansion of gambling ===
From 1894 to 1939, all gambling was theoretically outlawed in New Jersey, but enforcement was spotty, and it is not clear whether social gambling was prohibited. Bookmaking, numbers games, and slot machines were common through the state, many churches and other non-profit organizations openly held bingos, and Freehold Raceway operated without interruption. Racetrack gambling was re-legalized in 1939. In 1953, voters approved a referendum to officially allow non-profit organizations to have bingo and raffles based on approval of the municipal governing body and subject to state regulation. In 1959, amusement games were re-legalized after a 1957 court decision had declared them to be a form of illegal gambling. In 1969, 81.5% of New Jersey voted in favor of a referendum creating the New Jersey Lottery, and in 1975, New Jersey initiated the Pick-It (later renamed the Pick-3), the first legal lottery game in the United States in which buyers could pick their own numbers.

In 1974, New Jersey voters voted against legalizing casino gambling statewide, but two years later approved a new referendum that legalized casinos, but restricted them to Atlantic City. At that time, Nevada was the only state with legal casino gambling. Resorts Atlantic City was the first casino to open in 1978. In 2006, an impasse over the state's budget between then-governor Jon Corzine and the state legislature resulted in a lengthy state government shutdown at the height of the summer tourist season; this caused the temporary closure of all of Atlantic City's casinos (as well as racetracks throughout the state) because New Jersey law states that gambling establishments can not legally operate without government oversight from the New Jersey Casino Control Commission. The closures cost the state an estimated $1.3 million in casino revenues in addition to the loss of state taxes collected on casino employee wages. As of early 2021, Atlantic City's gaming revenue still had not returned to its 2006 peak. Arguably, the temporary shutdown of Atlantic City's casinos in 2006 encouraged neighboring states to continue developing their own gaming industries.

=== Sports betting ===
In January 2012, New Jersey Governor Chris Christie signed legislation allowing sports betting in New Jersey after it was approved by a 2-to-1 margin in a voter referendum held in November 2011. The law permits any of the state's 12 casinos and 4 racetracks to offer gambling on professional and college sports, but prohibits them from accepting bets on college events played in New Jersey, or out-of-state games involving New Jersey college teams. The New Jersey Division of Gaming Enforcement subsequently issued regulations for sports betting.

The National Collegiate Athletic Association (NCAA), the National Basketball Association (NBA), the National Football League (NFL), the National Hockey League, and Major League Baseball filed a federal lawsuit against New Jersey to prevent sports betting, based on the Professional and Amateur Sports Protection Act of 1992 which banned sports betting in all but four states. In February 2013, United States District Court judge Michael A. Shipp ruled in favor of the athletic leagues, and barred New Jersey from issuing sports betting licenses. The court ruled that under the Commerce Clause of the United States Constitution, the regulation of gambling and the granting of a grandfather clause to four states is within Congress's power. In September 2013, a three-judge panel from the 3rd Circuit Court of Appeals voted 2-1 to uphold Shipp's decision. Christie said he will appeal the case to the United States Supreme Court.

In 2014, New Jersey challenged the Professional and Amateur Sports Protection Act of 1992 (PASPA) which had effectively grandfathered Nevada's federal statutory monopoly on legal sports betting.

On June 27, 2017, the Supreme Court agreed to hear Christie v. National Collegiate Athletic Association. On May 14, 2018, the court issued its opinion in Murphy v. National Collegiate Athletic Association (the case had been renamed due to the election of Phil Murphy as governor). The Court overturned the Appeals Court decision, ruling that the Professional and Amateur Sports Protection Act was unconstitutional. Justice Alito wrote the opinion supporting New Jersey's assertion.

This allowed New Jersey to move ahead with plans to implement legalized sports betting. On June 11, 2018, Governor Phil Murphy signed Assembly Bill 4111, legalizing sports betting at casinos and racetracks within New Jersey. It also allowed casinos and racetracks to seek approval for online and mobile sports betting after thirty days. On June 14, 2018, Governor Murphy placed the first bets in the State of New Jersey at the sports book at Monmouth Park. The first online sports bet was taken in August 2018.

As of 2023, 23 legal online sportsbooks are both operating in New Jersey and licensed by the New Jersey Division of Gaming Enforcement, four fewer than the 27 licensed online sportsbooks that operated in New Jersey at the start of 2022. The 23 online sportsbooks currently licensed and operating in New Jersey are Barstool, Bet365, BetMGM, BetParx, Betway, Borgata, Caesars, DraftKings, FanDuel, Fox Bet, Fubo, Golden Nugget, Hard Rock, PlayUP, Prophet Exchange, PointsBet, BetRivers, Sporttrade, SuperBook, Tipico, Unibet, VIE (EEG), WynnBet.

According to the American Gaming Association, legal gambling revenues at New Jersey commercial establishments (not including tribal casinos) had a total $1,007 billion in sports betting revenue in 2023, second only to New York.

=== Online gambling ===
In January 2011, the New Jersey Legislature passed a bill sponsored by Raymond Lesniak to allow online gambling by New Jersey residents over 21. Because the state constitution allows casino gambling only in Atlantic City, the legislation specified that the computer servers operating the online gambling websites must be located at licensed casinos in Atlantic City. The Lesniak bill evaded possible federal prohibitions against online gambling by authorizing the Casino Control Commission to create regulations to ensure the bets were placed from inside New Jersey. However, Governor Chris Christie vetoed the legislation because of concerns that "allowing customers to bet through any computer terminal left open the chance of commercial businesses such as nightclubs and cafes becoming gambling hubs around the state", and "the bill further created a legal fiction that a bet placed anywhere in New Jersey counted as an Atlantic City bet".

In December 2011, the United States Justice Department issued a legal opinion that the Federal Wire Act prohibits only online sports betting, not online casino games. John Wefing, a constitutional scholar at Seton Hall Law School, told a state Assembly committee that he did not believe a constitutional amendment was needed to authorize online gambling because "any online poker bet would not be completed until a server in Atlantic City accepted the wager," and "wagers are contracts, and the law recognizes that contracts occur where the final action needed to take place occurs." However, State Senator Jennifer Beck has stated that online gambling cannot be legalized with the approval of New Jersey voters, and several federal courts decisions have said an online bet occurs in both the location of the website, and the location of the gambler.

To address Christie's concerns, new legislation was drafted that prohibits businesses other than Atlantic City casinos from advertising online gambling, or allowing their facilities to be used for online gambling. On February 26, 2013, a revised bill permitting Internet gambling was overwhelmingly approved by the New Jersey Legislature, and then signed into law by Chris Christie. The law legalizes online casino gambling for a ten-year trial period, restricts the operation of the websites to Atlantic City's eleven casinos, and imposes a 15% tax on online gambling revenue, instead of the 8% currently imposed on casinos.

The act requires that the gambler be at least 21 and play from a computer in New Jersey. The gambler's location will likely be verified through a global positioning system (GPS), and the bill allows interstate compacts to be signed in future in order to authorize multistate gambling. Comps will be available, but will need to be redeemed by visiting the casino. Macquarie Capital estimates that online gambling will provide Atlantic City's casino with $260 to $400 million in additional revenue per year. The Casino Control Commission will create regulations for online gambling. It is unclear when online gambling licenses will be issued, or if there will be any legal challenges to the new law.

Online casinos opened for business via a synchronized launch on November 21, 2013. At launch, game options were limited, but by 2017, twelve separate online casino brands offered many hundreds of games including a wide variety that have been brought over from the traditional casino world.

The NJDGE cleared online poker rooms to launch on November 26, 2013 at 9:00 am EST. Prior to offering online wagers on the 26th, operators were required to complete a five day “soft play” period in a manner satisfactory to the NJDGE. The first online poker sites to launch in New Jersey were partypoker, Borgata, and WSOP.com. These sites quickly gained popularity as they offered players the opportunity to play poker for real money from the comfort of their own homes. In 2014, the state’s online poker sites generated nearly $30 million in revenue, making it one of the most successful online poker markets in the United States.

In June 2017, it was reported that the New Jersey online gambling industry had surpassed $100 million in tax revenue. The combined revenues of all online casinos in New Jersey now actually exceed the revenues of the three NJ brick-and-mortar casinos with the lowest revenue figures.

When online casinos and online poker rooms first launched, they were restricted to the same state, meaning players in New Jersey could only play with other players in New Jersey. However, in October 2017, the state signed an interstate compact with Delaware and Nevada (both of whom had passed similar legislation to legalize online gambling) called the Multi-State Internet Gaming Agreement (MSIGA) so players across all three states could compete with each other in online poker and some casino gaming.

On May 1, 2018, WSOP made history by connecting its New Jersey and Nevada online poker platforms, along with three racinos in Delaware powered by 888poker, into one network with one player pool, creating the first multi-state online poker network in the US.

In May 2022, Michigan joined the MSIGA agreement, and on January 1, 2023, PokerStars became the first operator to connect its Michigan online poker platform with its New Jersey online poker platform. For the month of January 2023, PokerStars NJ reported 2.7 million in revenue, a 76% increase month over month, and its highest since April 2018.

New Jersey Attorney General reports: for the month of April 2022, online gambling win reported by casinos and their partners was $136.9 million, reflecting growth of 27.0% compared to $107.7 million for the prior period. For the year-to-date period, Internet Gaming Win reported by casinos and their partners was $545.4 million, reflecting growth of 30.2% compared to $419.0 million for the prior year-to-date period.

In May 2025, New Jersey online casinos hit record-breaking revenue, surpassing $246 million for the first time. As of June 2025, the online casino win was $1.39 billion, a 27.7% increase on the same period in 2024. In 2025, for the first time, online casinos in New Jersey saw a higher gaming win than Atlantic City's land-based venues, taking in $2.91 billion. Land-based casinos took in $2.89 billion.

=== Expansion of casino gambling outside Atlantic City ===
The proposed New Jersey Casino Expansion Amendment (2016) resulted from an agreement among Governor Chris Christie and Democratic state legislators, but voters rejected the ballot question by a margin of 77% to 23%. State legislators were in deadlock over who would be allowed to own new casinos and tax revenue sharing. The measure did not say where the casinos would be allowed. Location and other matters such as tax rates would be determined by enabling legislation to be passed by the state legislature. A law passed by popular vote in 1976 gives Atlantic City a monopoly on casino gambling in New Jersey.

An analysis by Fitch, a credit-rating agency, determined that as many as four of Atlantic City's eight casinos would be bankrupted by expanding casino gambling outside the city. Supporters of gambling in North Jersey said the measure would help Atlantic City by redirecting as much as $200 million per year in tax revenue to the city. Opponents said it was unlikely that much revenue would be generated and that it would not make up for the losses due to new competition. Even with no in-state competition allowed, four Atlantic City casinos have closed in recent years, causing severe economic problems.

== Casino gambling ==
As of 2019, New Jersey had nine casinos, all in Atlantic City. In 2011, they employed about 33,000 people, had 28.5 million visitors, made $3.4 billion in gambling revenue, and paid $278 million in taxes. The casinos are regulated by the New Jersey Casino Control Commission and New Jersey Division of Gaming Enforcement.

== New Jersey Lottery ==
The New Jersey Lottery currently offers eight lottery draw games, which are sold by retailers around the state, including the numbers game style Pick-3 and Pick-4, the keno-style Quick Draw, Cash Pop, the lotto-style Jersey Cash 5, and Pick-6 Xtra, and the multistate games Mega Millions and Powerball. The state also sells scratch card instate games. The games are overseen by the New Jersey Lottery Commission, and the revenue goes to prizes (59%), education (34%), retailers' commissions (6%), and administrative costs (1%).

In 2017, a new law was signed that allowed a percentage of lottery profits to help support the public-employee pension system for teachers, police, fire personnel and other public employees for a period of 30 years. As of June 30, 2022, the lottery had contributed $1.074 billion in profits to support the public-employee pension system.

=== Current games ===
Game	First sold	Frequency of drawings
Pick-3	May 22, 1975	Twice daily
Pick-4	June 9, 1977	Twice daily
Jersey Cash 5	September 30, 1992	Once daily
Quick Draw	July 17, 2017	Every 4 minutes from 5 am to 2 am daily
Cash Pop	September 30, 2019	Every 4 minutes from 5 am to 2 am daily
Pick-6 Xtra	May 9, 1980	Monday and Thursday
Mega Millions	May 26, 1999	Tuesday and Friday
Powerball	January 31, 2010	Monday, Wednesday, and Saturday
Instant games (scratch-offs)	June 17, 1975	Upon purchase

=== Former games ===
Game	Started	Ended
Lottery (original game)	December 16, 1970	
5-Digit Daily Game	November 29, 1972	January 1, 1976
Lottery Bingo/Super Bingo	February 6, 1980	July 29, 1981
Lucky 7	February 3, 1990	March 10, 1990
5 Card Lotto	January 11, 1988	September 18, 1990
Lotzee	June 14, 1998	September 13, 2003
Monopoly Millionaires' Club	October 19, 2014	December 26, 2014
5 Card Cash	May 16, 2016	May 3, 2020

== Horse racing and off-track betting ==
New Jersey currently has two racetracks and two off-track betting (OTB) halls, all of which are regulated by the New Jersey Racing Commission (an entity of the New Jersey Office of the Attorney General). The state passed a law in 2013 permitting one horse race per year on a New Jersey beach, and Monmouth Park will be conducting a beach race in Atlantic City based on the Palio di Siena.

In September 2024, Penn National announced their intention to close Freehold Raceway in December of that year. The closure was due to costs, shift sin the gambling markets and low attendance. As per the closure of Freehold Raceway, Penn National closed their three off track betting parlors.

=== Current Racetracks ===
Racetrack	Opening Date	Town
Meadowlands Racetrack	September 1, 1976	East Rutherford
Monmouth Park Racetrack	July 30, 1870	Oceanport

=== Current off-track betting halls ===
OTB Hall	Opening Date	Town
Favorites at Woodbridge	October 17, 2007	Fords
Winners Bayonne	July 17, 2012	Bayonne

=== Former Racetracks ===
Racetrack	Opening Date	Closing Date	Town
Atlantic City Race Course	July 22, 1946	January 16, 2015	Mays Landing
Garden State Park Racetrack	July 7, 1942	May 3, 2001	Cherry Hill
Freehold Raceway	1830s (informally); 1854 (officially)	December 28, 2024	Freehold

=== Former off-track betting halls ===
OTB Hall	Opening Date	Closing Date	Town
Favorites at Toms River	April 29, 2009	December 28, 2024	Toms River
Favorites at Vineland	March 30, 2007	December 28, 2024	Vineland
Favorites at Gloucester Township	July 2, 2014	December 28, 2024	Gloucester Township

== Charity, amusement, and social gambling ==
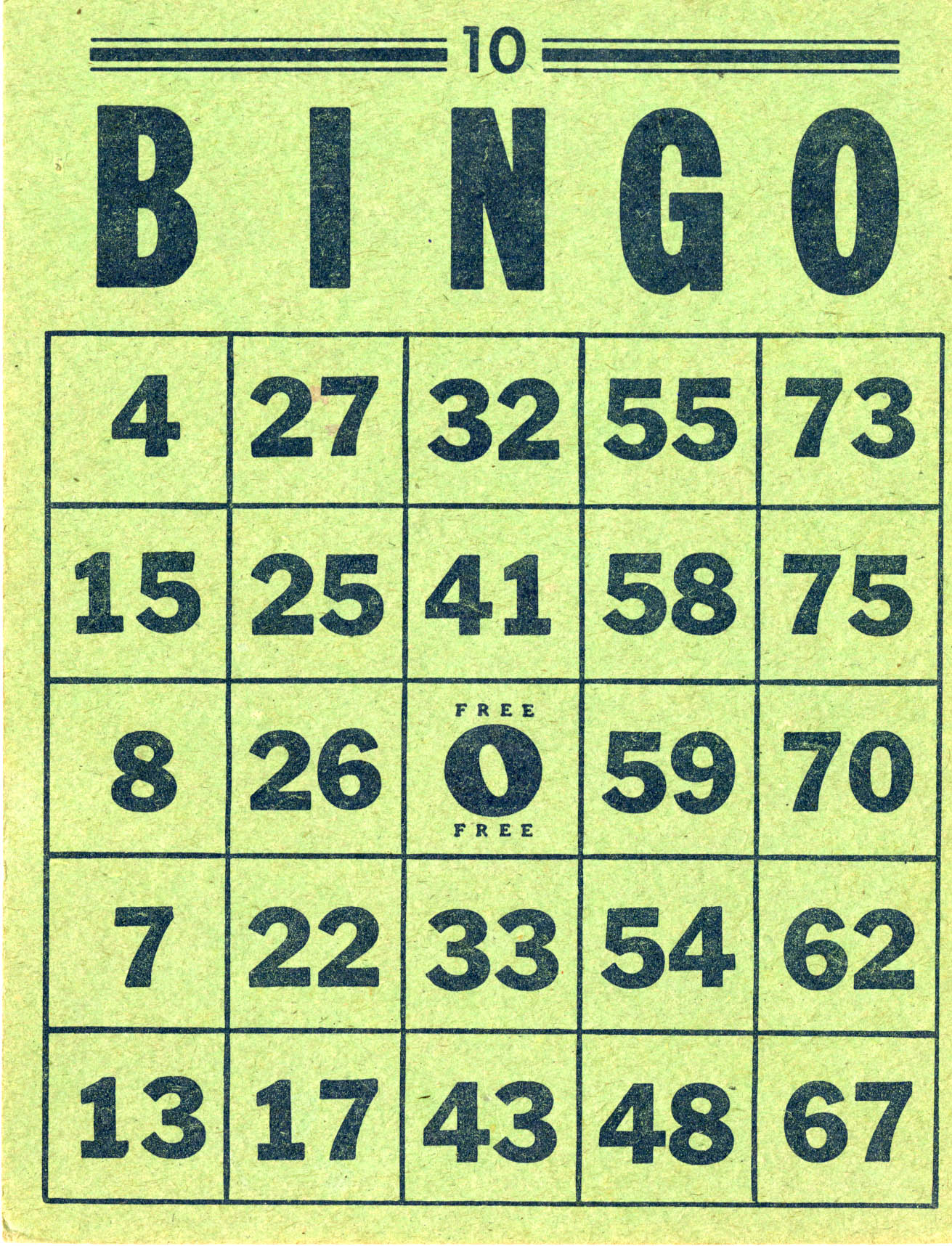
New Jersey allows non-profit organizations to run bingos and raffles.

The state of New Jersey allows charity gambling, where non-profit organizations (e.g., churches, fraternal organizations) to run bingos, raffles, casino nights, and armchair races. Amusement parks, carnivals, and boardwalks in shore communities are allowed to have amusement games involving skill or chance (e.g., spinning wheels, skeeball). Charity gambling and amusement games are regulated by the New Jersey Legalized Games of Chance Control Commission.

In the 2021 New Jersey gubernatorial election voters approved Public Question No. 2, which amended the charity gambling law to allow all non-profit organizations to raise money from games of chance to support their operations. Prior to the vote, only organizations that supported veterans and senior citizens were permitted to use proceeds from those games to support their operations.

New Jersey permits social gambling (e.g., workplace football pool, a family poker game) insofar as the organizer of the game is on equal terms with the other participants, and does not take a cut of the gambling proceeds. Furthermore, it is never a criminal offense in New Jersey to be a player in a gambling operation. However, the New Jersey Alcoholic Beverage Commission prohibits bars and other holder of liquor licenses from allowing social gambling.

== Illegal gambling ==
Each year billions of dollars of illegal gambling takes place in New Jersey. Illegal gambling operations range from employees who make money on office sports betting pools to online poker websites to multimillion-dollar enterprises run by organized criminals. Despite the availability of legal gambling in New Jersey, studies have shown that illegal gambling persists because it offers options that are not available legally, e.g. casino gambling outside Atlantic City, and because some gamblers prefer using a bookmaker whom they know personally. State law does not punish players, but a person operating an illegal gambling enterprise, or possessing equipment or records used for illegal gambling can face up to five years in prison. However, illegal gambling arrests are rare in New Jersey, and there is presumption of non-incarceration for first-time offenders.

== Minimum age ==
A person must be at least 21 to gamble at a casino in New Jersey. It is legal for a minor to go to a casino insofar as they do not gamble, consume alcoholic beverages, or remain on the gambling floor. Underage gambling at a casino is a disorderly persons offense (misdemeanor), punishable by a $500–1000 fine and a mandatory six-month driver's license suspension, and plea bargaining of underage gambling charges is prohibited. The legal age for other forms of licensed gambling (e.g., lottery, horse race) is 18, but a person under 18 may take part in amusement games where the prize is an item (e.g., a stuffed animal), and not cash. There is no minimum age for social gambling.

== Problem gambling ==
Legalizing all forms of gambling in the United States has increased access to gambling for youth aged 16 to 25, revealing many youth with problem gambling behaviors. For example, in New Jersey, which legalized sports betting in 2018, 70% of 16- to 25-year-olds report seeing at least four weekly gambling ads on social media. Additionally, calls to the Council on Compulsive Gambling of New Jersey's helpline have increased by 225% since legalization, with 35% of calls seeking help for people under 25. There is also evidence that minors can bet online despite age restrictions.

In July 2026, the Campaign for Fairer Gambling published new research calling on New Jersey lawmakers to ban online micro-betting, describing it as an “urgent public health threat” in the state. Proposed legislation would lead to gambling operators being fined for accepting micro-bets.

== See also ==
- Law of New Jersey
