= Government of New Jersey =

Overview of the government of the U.S. state of New Jersey

- Logo of the New Jersey government Great Seal of the State of New Jersey
- Polity type: Sub-national administrative division (federated state)
- Part of: United States of America
- Constitution: Constitution of New Jersey

Legislative branch
- Name: Legislature
- Type: Bicameral
- Meeting place: New Jersey State House
- Upper house
- Name: Senate
- Presiding officer: Nicholas Scutari, President
- Lower house
- Name: General Assembly
- Presiding officer: Craig Coughlin, Speaker

Executive branch
- Head of state and government
- Title: Governor
- Currently: Mikie Sherrill
- Appointer: Election
- Cabinet
- Name: New Jersey Cabinet
- Leader: Governor
- Deputy leader: Lieutenant Governor
- Headquarters: State House

Judicial branch
- Name: Judiciary of New Jersey
- Courts: Courts of New Jersey
- Supreme Court of New Jersey
- Chief judge: Stuart Rabner
- Seat: Richard J. Hughes Justice Complex, Trenton

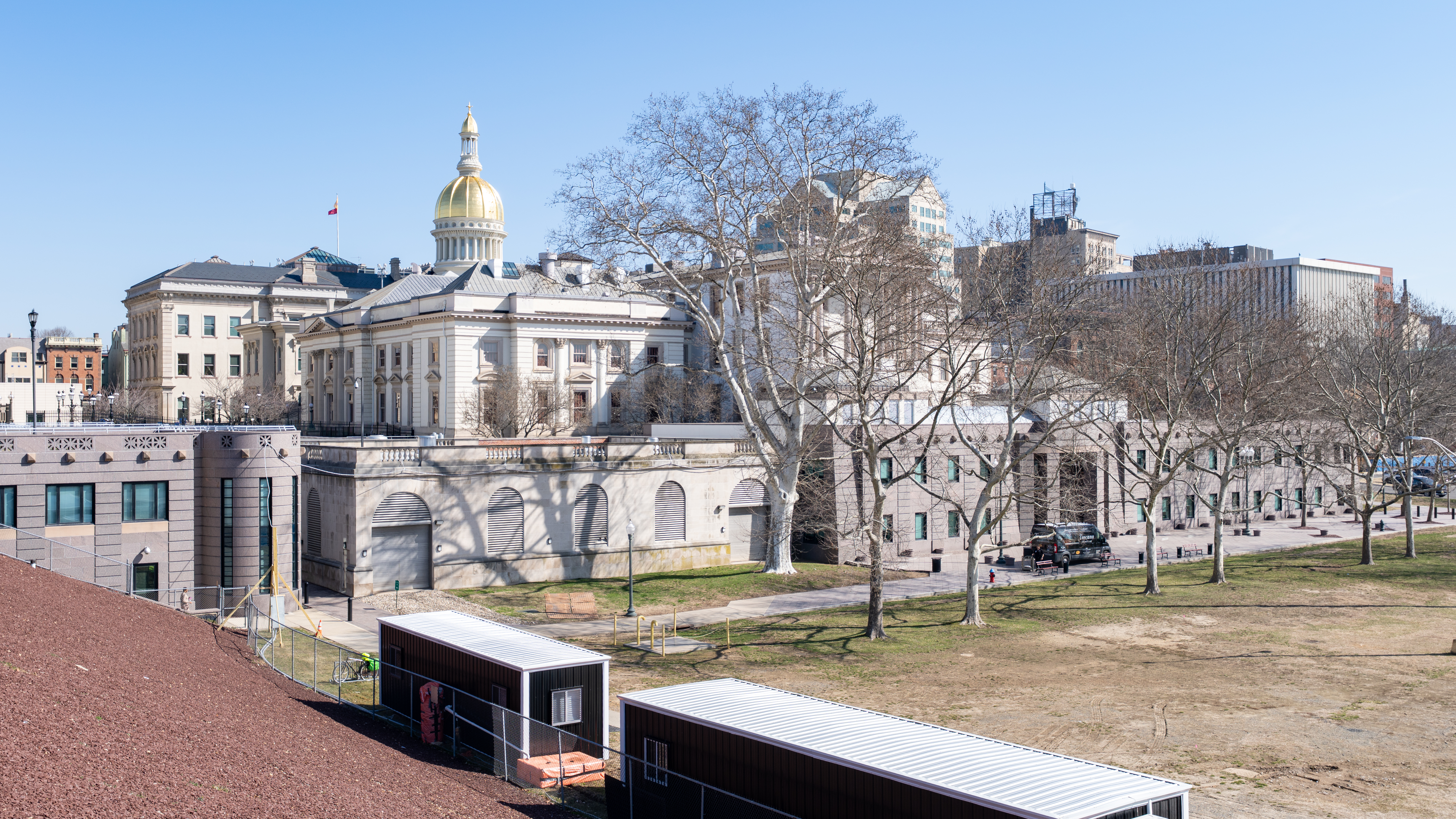
New Jersey's State House in Trenton, New Jersey, seen from the west

The government of the State of New Jersey is separated into three distinct branches: legislative, executive, and judicial. The powers of the State of New Jersey are vested by the Constitution of New Jersey, enacted in 1947, in a bicameral state legislature (consisting of the General Assembly and Senate), the Governor, and the state courts, headed the New Jersey Supreme Court. The powers and duties of these branches are further defined by acts of the state legislature, including the creation of executive departments and courts inferior to the Supreme Court.

Like most states, the state allows the incorporation of county, and other local municipal governments. The state capital is located in Trenton.

== Executive branch ==
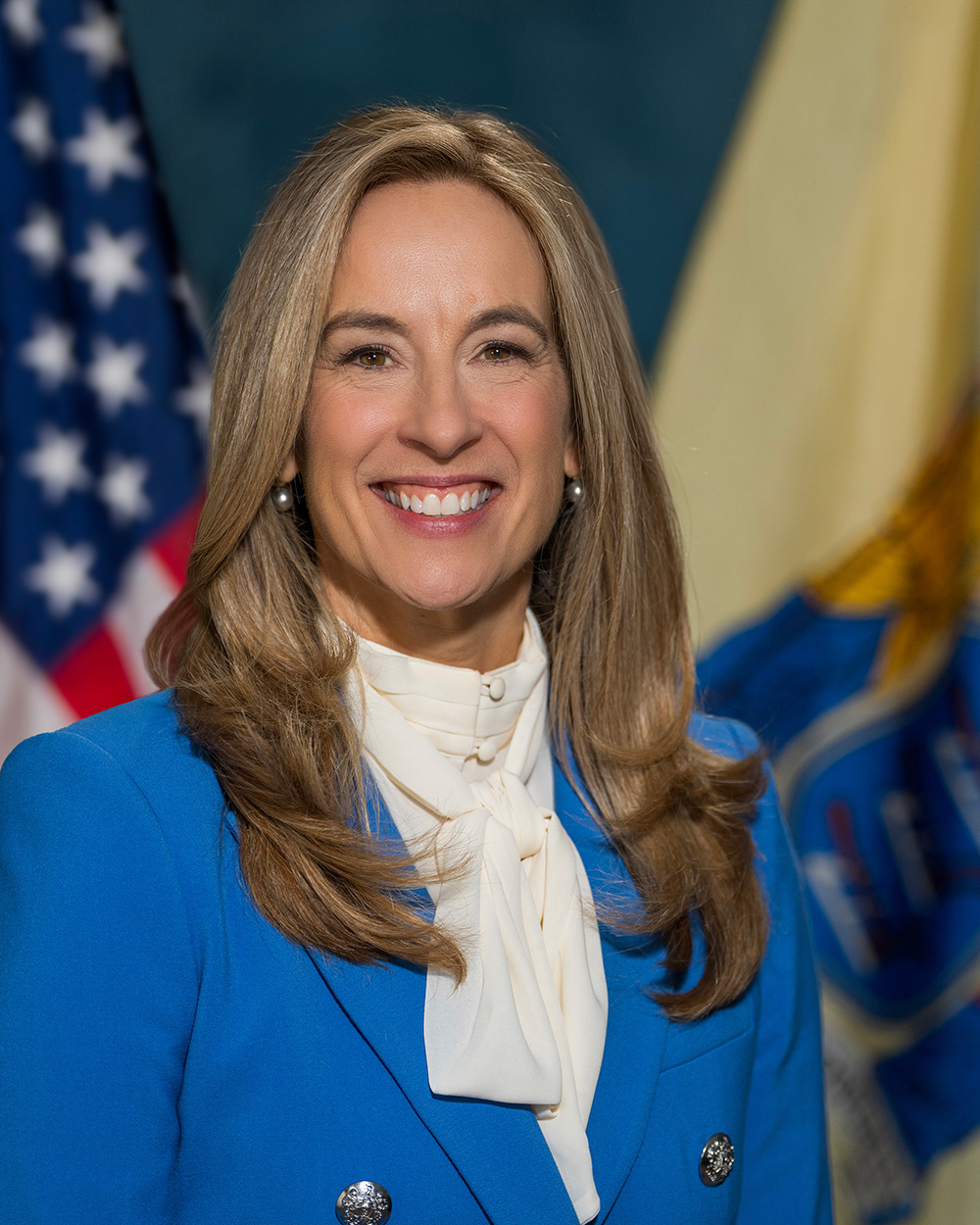
Mikie Sherrill is New Jersey's 57th Governor.

The executive branch is organized into departments, which may not number more than twenty according to the constitution; there are eighteen departments and fifty-six agencies. Temporary commissions may be allocated by law for special purposes outside of the departments.

The New Jersey Register is the official journal of state agency rulemaking containing the full text of agency proposed and adopted rules, notices of public hearings, Gubernatorial Orders, and agency notices of public interest. The New Jersey Administrative Code (N.J.A.C.) is a compilation of all rules adopted by state agencies.

=== Governor ===
The Governor of New Jersey is head of the executive branch. The office of governor is an elected position, for which elected officials serve four-year terms. Governors cannot be elected to more than two consecutive terms, but there is no limit on the total number of terms they may serve. The official residence for the governor is Drumthwacket, a mansion located in Princeton, New Jersey; the office of the governor is at the New Jersey State House in Trenton. The Governor is responsible for appointing two constitutionally created officers, the New Jersey Attorney General and the Secretary of State of New Jersey, with the approval of the senate.

=== Lieutenant governor ===
The lieutenant governor of New Jersey is the second highest-ranking official in the state government. The office of lieutenant governor is elected on a ticket with the governor for a four-year term concurrent with the governor. Because the position lacks distinct powers or purpose other than to exist solely as next in the order of succession, the state constitution requires that the lieutenant governor be appointed to serve as the head of a cabinet-level department or administrative agency within the Governor's administration. However, pursuant to the state constitution, a lieutenant governor cannot serve as the state's Attorney General.

Prior to 2010, New Jersey was one of a few states in the United States that did not have a lieutenant governor to succeed to the governorship in the event of a vacancy in that office. For most of the state's (and previously the colony's) history, a vacancy in the position of governor was filled by the president of the State Senate (called the "Legislative Council" from 1776 to 1844), or during the colonial era by the president of the royal governor's Provincial Council. After several episodes where the state had multiple "acting governors" in the span of a few years following the resignations of Governor Christine Todd Whitman in 2001 and Governor James E. McGreevey in 2004, popular sentiment and political pressure from the state's residents and news media outlets sought a permanent and tenable solution to the issue of succession when the governor's office became vacant. A 2005 referendum to amend the constitution provided for the position of lieutenant governor to be created, to change the order of succession, and that the post would be filled in next gubernatorial election (2009).

Republican Kim Guadagno was the first to serve in the post in its modern form. Guadagno, previously the sheriff in Monmouth County, was chosen by Governor Chris Christie to be his running-mate on the Republican party ticket in the 2009 election.

=== Departments ===
The state constitution provides that the governor appoints the heads of up to 20 principal departments. As of 2026, the state's executive branch has 16 cabinet-level or principal departments.

Principal department	Notes	Cabinet Member
Department of Agriculture	Department jointly managed by the Secretary of Agriculture and an 8-member State Board of Agriculture; Department promotes and protects state agriculture and agribusiness; oversees school meal programs, and distribution of surplus food from federal programs; oversees soil and water resources; maintains farmland for agricultural uses; promotes development of overseas markets for New Jersey products from its farms and fisheries; and administers agricultural education programs.	Edward Wengryn
Department of Banking and Insurance	Department licenses and regulates all state-chartered financial institutions, regulates the state's insurance industry, and handles investigations and prosecutions for civil insurance fraud violations	Susan Ochs (acting)
Department of Children and Families	Department ensures the safety, well-being, and success of children, youth, families, and communities through licensing childcare facilities; overseeing specialized educational services; preventing, investigating, and intervening to stop child abuse and neglect, providing services for pregnant women, children's behavioral health, and welfare programs	Joseph Ribsam (acting)
Department of Community Affairs	Department provides administrative guidance, financial support, and technical assistance to local governments, community development organizations, businesses, and individuals to improve the quality of life in New Jersey.; Oversees municipality's financial integrity and solvency, statewide implementation of building codes, and fire safety codes, and promotes community planning and economic development	Jacquelyn A. Suárez
Department of Corrections	Department operates 14 major correctional or penal institutions, including eight adult male correctional facilities, three youth facilities, one facility for sex offenders, one women's correctional institution and a central reception / intake unit; and stabilization and reintegration programs for released inmates.	Victoria Kuhn
Department of Education	Department administers state and federal aid programs affecting more than 1.4 million public and non-public elementary and secondary school children; ensures schools comply with state and federal laws and regulations; oversees pupil transportation services; directs education programs for adults and for persons who are handicapped, disadvantaged or foreign-born	Dr. Lily Laux
Department of Environmental Protection	Department responsible for managing the state's natural resources and addressing issues related to pollution, monitors and sets standards for State's air quality and fresh, marine, groundwater quality; compels environmental remediation of contaminated or polluted sites; oversees solid and hazardous waste management programs; protects and manages open space, wetlands, coastal and stream/floodplains, state parks, state forests, and protects state and private lands from wildfire; protects and manages the state's fish and wildlife resources	Ed Potosnak
Department of Health	Department records vital statistics (birth, marriages, deaths, etc.); protects the public health through regulatory compliance and community programs; evaluates and licenses healthcare facilities; facilitates medical research	Dr. Raynard Washington
Department of Human Services	Department serves seniors, individuals, and families with low incomes; people with mental illnesses, addictions, developmental disabilities, or late-onset disabilities; people who are blind, visually impaired, deaf, hard of hearing, or deaf-blind; parents needing child care services, child support and/or healthcare for their children; and families facing catastrophic medical expenses for their children.	Dr. Stephen Cha
Department of Labor and Workforce Development	Department administers state- and federal-funded job training programs, workers' compensation courts, unemployment insurance program, temporary disability insurance program, family leave insurance program, wage and hour enforcement	Kevin Jarvis (acting)
Department of Law and Public Safety	Department responsible for public prosecutions, protecting and safeguarding civil and consumer rights, promoting highway traffic safety, maintaining public confidence in the alcoholic beverage, gaming, and racing industries, and providing legal services and counsel to other state agencies; consists of the New Jersey State Police, the Office of Homeland Security and Preparedness, and New Jersey Cybersecurity and Communications Integration Cell.	Jennifer Davenport
Department of Military Affairs	Department consists of New Jersey Army National Guard and New Jersey Air National Guard, and includes emergency services and disaster preparedness and response.	Brigadier General Yvonne Mays
Department of State	The New Jersey Department of State oversees state archives and records management; management and certification of elections; artistic, cultural, and historical programs; promotes tourism; keeper of the state's Great Seal; also nominally oversees higher education and the Sports and Exposition Authority	Shirley Emehelu (acting)
Department of Transportation	Department oversees maintenance and operation of state's highway and public road system, planning and developing transportation policy and assisting with rail, freight, and intermodal transportation issues; oversees New Jersey Transit (passenger rail, light rail, and bus); formerly included Division of Motor Vehicles (DMV), which was re-established in 2003 as the self-operating New Jersey Motor Vehicle Commission (MVC).	Priya Jain
Department of the Treasury	Department work to ensure the most beneficial use of fiscal resources and revenues to meet critical needs, all within a policy framework set by the governor; to formulate and manage the state's budget, generate and collect revenues, disburse the appropriations used to operate New Jersey state government, manage the state's physical and financial assets, and provide statewide support services to state and local government agencies	Aaron Binder
Department of Veterans Affairs	Department oversees all state-run housing, healthcare, benefits, and other programs for veterans.	Vincent Solomeno

== Legislative branch ==
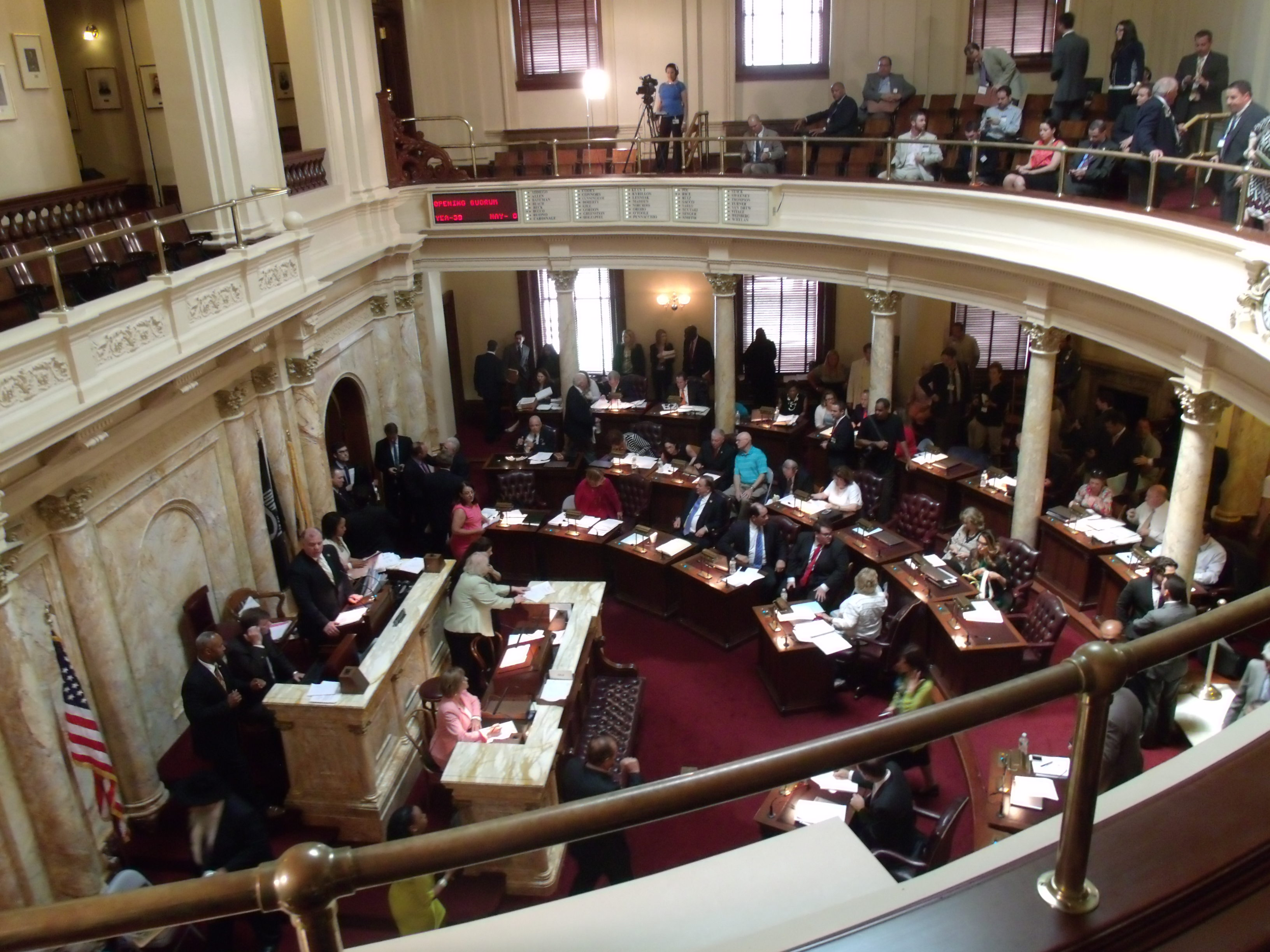
The New Jersey Senate during a session in June 2013

The NJ Constitution provides for a bicameral Legislature consisting of a Senate of 40 members and an Assembly of 80 members. Each of the 40 legislative districts elects one Senator and two Assembly members. Assembly members are elected by the people for a two-year term in all odd-numbered years; Senators are elected in the years ending in 1, 3, and 7 and thus serve either four- or two-year terms.

The Legislature is responsible for the appointment of the New Jersey State Auditor, the only state officer which is appointed by the legislature. Its session laws are published in the Acts of the Legislature of the State of New Jersey, commonly known as the Laws of New Jersey, which are codified in the New Jersey Statutes (N.J.S.), also referred to as the Revised Statutes (R.S.), which are in turn published in the New Jersey Statutes Annotated (N.J.S.A.).

The members of the New Jersey Legislature are chosen from 40 electoral districts. Each district elects one Senator and two Assemblymen. New Jersey is one of seven U.S. states along with Arizona, Idaho, Maryland, North Dakota, South Dakota, and Washington in which districts for the upper and lower house of the legislature are coterminous. Districts are redefined decennially by the New Jersey Apportionment Commission following each U.S. Census, as provided by Article IV, Section III of the State Constitution.

=== Senate ===
The New Jersey Senate was established as the upper house of the New Jersey Legislature by the Constitution of 1844, replacing the Legislative Council. There are 40 legislative districts, representing districts with average populations of 232,225 (2020 figure). Each district has one senator and two members of the New Jersey General Assembly, the lower house of the legislature. Prior to the election in which they are chosen, senators must be a minimum of 30 years old and a resident of the state for four years to be eligible to serve in office.

From 1844 until 1965 (when redistricting could be done following the Reynolds v. Sims decision), each county was an electoral district electing one senator. Under the 1844 Constitution the term of office was three years, which was changed to four years with the 1947 Constitution. Since 1968 the Senate has consisted of 40 senators, who are elected in a "2-4-4" cycle. Senators serve a two-year term at the beginning of each decade, with the rest of the decade divided into two four-year terms. The "2-4-4" cycle was put into place so that Senate elections can reflect the changes made to the district boundaries on the basis of the decennial United States Census. If the cycle were not put into place, then the boundaries would sometimes be four years out of date before being used for Senate elections. Rather, with the varied term, the boundaries are only two years out of date. Thus elections for Senate seats take place in years ending with a "1", "3", or "7" (i.e. next elections in 2027, 2031, and 2033).

=== General Assembly ===
Since the election of 1967 (1968 Session), the Assembly has consisted of 80 members. Two members are elected from each of New Jersey's 40 legislative districts for a term of two years, each representing districts with average populations of 232,225 (2020 figures), with deviation in each district not exceeding 3.21% above and below that average. To be eligible to run, a potential candidate must be at least 21 years of age, and must have lived in their district for at least one year prior to the election, and have lived in the state of New Jersey for two years. They also must be residents of their districts. Membership in the Assembly is considered a part-time job, and many members have employment in addition to their legislative work. Assembly members serve two-year terms, elected every odd-numbered year in November.

The Assembly is led by the Speaker of the Assembly, who is elected by the membership of the chamber. After the Lieutenant Governor of New Jersey and the President of the New Jersey Senate, the Speaker of the Assembly is third in the line of succession to replace the Governor of New Jersey in the event that the governor is unable to execute the duties of that office. The Speaker decides the schedule for the Assembly, which bills will be considered, appoints committee chairmen, and generally runs the Assembly's agenda. The current Speaker is Craig Coughlin (D-Woodbridge).

=== Legislative Leadership ===
Senate leadership				Assembly leadership			
Senate position	Senator	Party	Senate district	Assembly position	Representative	Party	Assembly district
President of the Senate	Nicholas Scutari	Democratic	New Jersey's 22nd legislative district	Speaker of the Assembly	Craig Coughlin	Democratic	New Jersey's 19th legislative district
President pro tempore	Sandra Bolden Cunningham	Democratic	New Jersey's 31st legislative district	Speaker pro tempore	Benjie E. Wimberly	Democratic	New Jersey's 35th legislative district
Majority Leader	Teresa Ruiz	Democratic	New Jersey's 29th legislative district	Majority Leader	Louis Greenwald	Democratic	New Jersey's 6th legislative district
Minority Leader	Anthony M. Bucco	Republican	New Jersey's 25th legislative district	Minority Leader	John DiMaio	Republican	New Jersey's 23rd legislative district

== Judicial branch ==
The state court system of New Jersey comprises the New Jersey Supreme Court, the state supreme court, and many lower courts.

=== Supreme Court of New Jersey ===
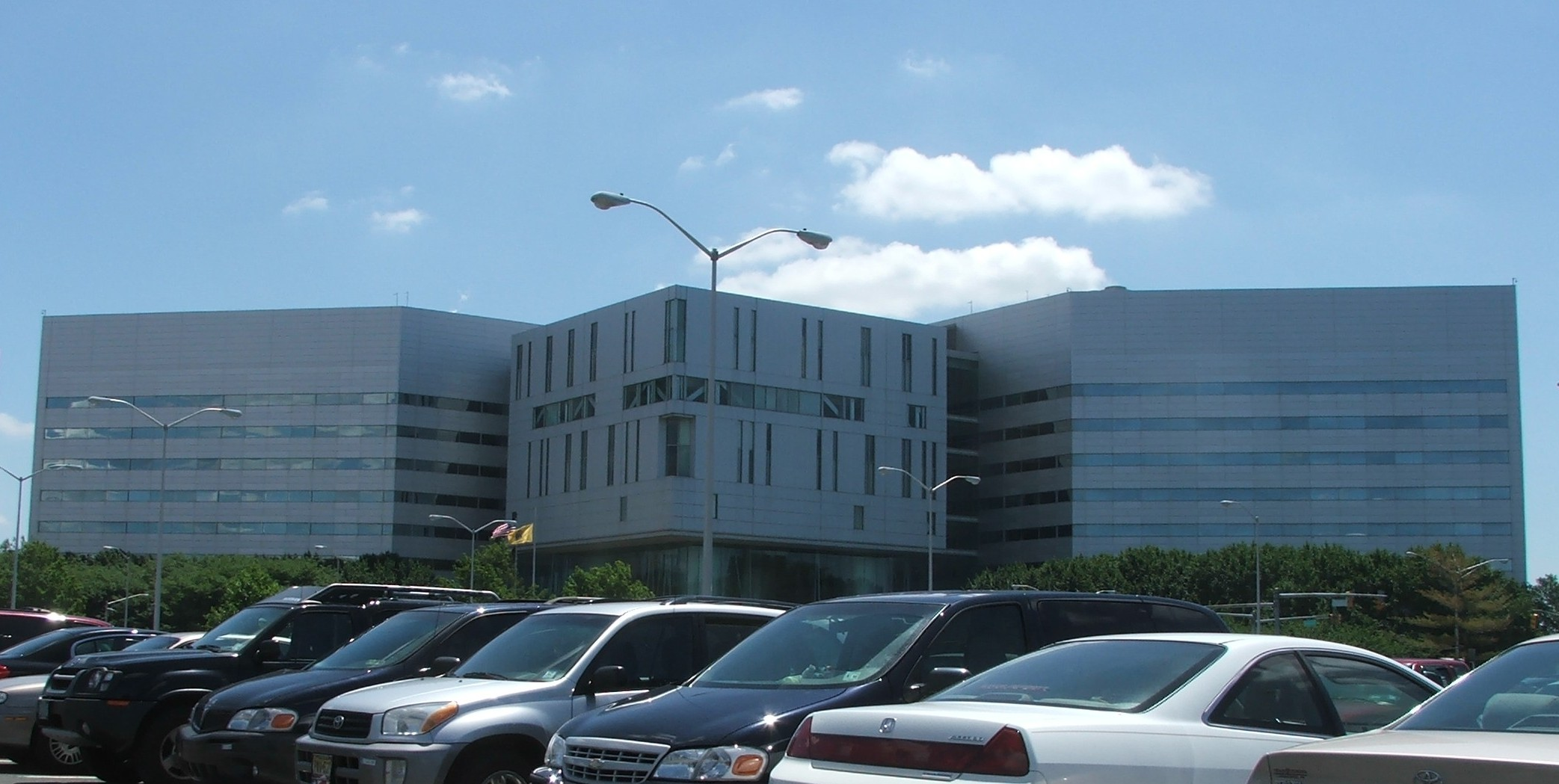
The Richard J. Hughes Justice Complex, in Trenton, is where the Supreme Court of New Jersey sits. It also houses the Administrative Office of the Courts which oversees the lower courts statewide.

The Supreme Court is the highest court in the state. It hears appeals from the Appellate Courts. It has the capacity, rarely exercised, to look into other cases within the judicial and executive branches.

The Court consists of a chief justice and six associate justices. All are appointed by the Governor with the advice and consent of a majority of the membership of the state senate. Justices serve an initial seven-year term, after which they can be reappointed to serve until age 70. The New Jersey Supreme Court was created and its role established by the delegates to the Constitutional Convention of 1947. As the highest court in the State, it replaced the prior Court of Errors and Appeals, created under the Constitution of 1844. It is the final judicial authority on all cases in the state court system, the sole determinant of the constitutionality of state laws with respect to the state constitution, and the arbiter and overseer of the decennial legislative redistricting.

=== Superior Court of New Jersey, Appellate Division ===
According to Mandel's New Jersey Appellate Practice, "The Appellate Division of New Jersey's Superior Court is the first level appellate court, with appellate review authority over final judgments of the trial divisions and the Tax Court and over final decisions and actions of State administrative agencies."

The state's Supreme Court held that "an appellate court's judgment provides 'the final directive of the appeals courts as to the matter appealed, setting out with specificity the court's determination that the action appealed from should be affirmed, reversed, remanded or modified'"

=== Superior Court of New Jersey ===
The Superior Court is the state court in the U.S. state of New Jersey, with statewide trial and appellate jurisdiction. The New Jersey Constitution of 1947 establishes the power of the New Jersey courts. Under the State Constitution, "'judicial power shall be vested in a Supreme Court, a Superior Court, County Courts and inferior courts of limited jurisdiction.'" The Superior Court has three divisions: the Appellate Division is essentially an intermediate appellate court while the Law and Chancery Divisions function as trial courts. The State Constitution renders the New Jersey Superior Court, Appellate Division the intermediate appellate court, and "[a]ppeals may be taken to the Appellate Division of the Superior Court from the law and chancery divisions of the Superior Court and in such other causes as may be provided by law." Each division is in turn divided into various parts. "The trial divisions of the Superior Court are the principal trial courts of New Jersey. They are located within the State's various judicial geographic units, called 'vicinages,' R. 1:33-2(a), and are organized into two basic divisions: the Chancery Division and the Law Division".

Like justices of the New Jersey Supreme Court, judges of the Superior Court are appointed by the Governor and confirmed by the State Senate for initial terms of seven years. If reappointed before the expiration of the initial term, the judge is said to have tenure and can serve until the mandatory judicial retirement age of 70. Retired judges may be recalled to serve in courts other than the Supreme Court. Judges are assigned to the court's divisions and parts (and in the case of the Law and Chancery Divisions, to a particular vicinage) by the Supreme Court.

=== Municipal Court ===
The Municipal Courts carry out most of the day-to-day work in the New Jersey courts, where simple traffic tickets, minor criminal offenses, and small civil matters are heard.

=== Tax Court ===
The Tax Court is a court of limited jurisdiction. Tax Court judges hear appeals of tax decisions made by County Boards of Taxation. They also hear appeals on decisions made by the Director of the Division of Taxation on such matters as state income, sales and business taxes, and homestead rebates. Appeals from Tax Court decisions are heard in the Appellate Division of Superior Court. Tax Court judges are appointed by the Governor for initial terms of seven years, and upon reappointment are granted tenure until they reach the mandatory retirement age of 70. There are 12 Tax Court judgeships.

== Local government ==
A map of New Jersey's 564 municipalities and 21 counties

=== Counties ===
New Jersey has 21 counties, each of which is administered by a Board of County Commissioners—an elected commission of either three, five, seven, or nine seats determined by the size of the county's population—that oversee a range of executive and legislative functions. In most counties, the commissioners are elected at-large, where each commissioner represents the entire county. Hudson County divides the county into nine districts that are equal in population size and represented by one commissioner. Essex County and Atlantic County have five commissioners representing districts and four commissioners elected at-large. In some counties, commissioners perform both legislative and executive functions on a commission basis, with each commissioner assigned responsibility for a department or group of departments. In Atlantic, Bergen, Essex, Hudson, and Mercer counties, there is a directly elected county executive who performs the executive functions while the Board of County Commissioners retains a legislative and oversight role. In counties without an executive, a county administrator or county manager may be hired to perform day-to-day administration of county functions.

=== Municipalities ===
As of 2023, New Jersey's 21 counties are divided into 564 municipalities. Each municipality is located in exactly one county; there are no independent cities or consolidated city-counties. There is no unincorporated territory in the state, making New Jersey one of the few states outside New England in which every square foot is incorporated. Title 40 of the New Jersey Statutes allows the state's municipalities to be incorporated under five types- city, town, township, borough, and village, with twelve management forms. The U.S. Census Bureau reports that New Jersey has 252 boroughs, 52 cities, 15 towns, 241 townships, and 4 villages. Several municipalities continue to operate under special charters that do not conform with the government formats prescribed by the current statutes. New Jersey's municipalities range in population from towns with small single-digit or double-digit populations (as in Tavistock or Walpack Township) or cities in which several hundred thousand people reside, such as Newark, Paterson or Trenton.

=== School districts ===
New Jersey distinguishes between regional, consolidated and countywide school districts and those serving single municipalities. There are also non-operating school districts, which are those districts that do not operate any school facilities and where all students attend school in other districts as part of sending/receiving relationships. The majority of school districts in New Jersey are established for general purposes and have boundaries equivalent to the municipality with which they are associated. The schools of each public school district are governed by a board of education. There is a superintendent for each district, which may be shared between districts, and a county superintendent of schools (the state Department of Education's representative) and executive county superintendent of schools (gubernatorial appointments whose duties include reducing district spending, collaboration and shared services) in each county.

== See also ==
- Elections in New Jersey
- Law of New Jersey
- New Jersey's congressional delegations
- Political party strength in New Jersey
- Politics of New Jersey
