= New Jersey Division of Gaming Enforcement =

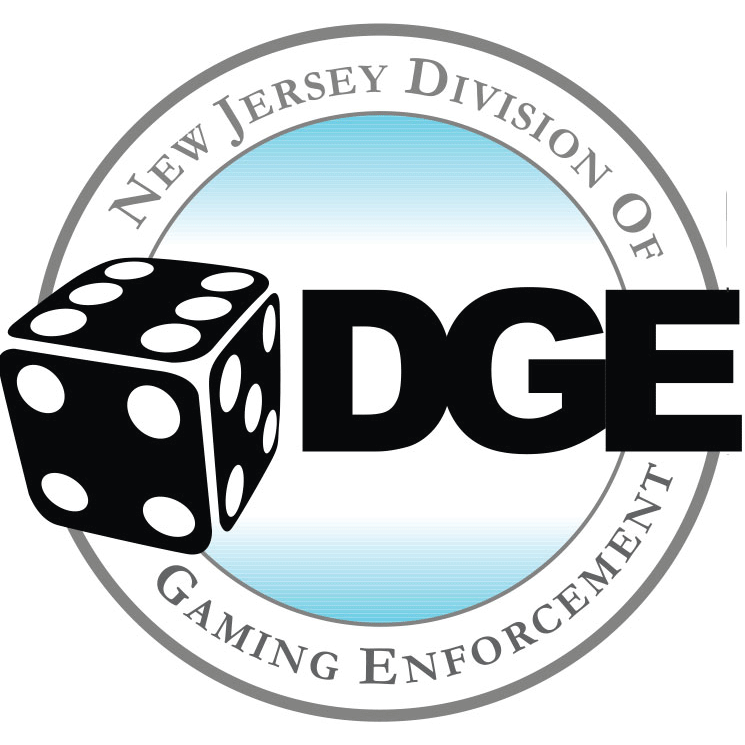
- Seal of the DGE

Division overview
- Formed: June 2, 1977; 49 years ago
- Jurisdiction: Government of New Jersey
- Headquarters: 1300 Atlantic Avenue, Atlantic City, NJ 08401 140 East Front Street, P.O. Box 047, Trenton, NJ 08625
- Division executives: Mary Jo Flaherty, Interim Director; Louis S. Rogacki, Deputy Director
- Parent department: New Jersey Department of Law and Public Safety
- Website: njdge.org

The New Jersey Division of Gaming Enforcement (DGE) is a governmental agency in the U.S. state of New Jersey that was established in 1977 under the Casino Control Act, N.J.S.A. to ensure the integrity of the casino gaming industry, including sports wagering at horse racetracks, in the state. The DGE operates within the New Jersey Department of Law and Public Safety in the office of the New Jersey Attorney General.

The DGE is supervised by a director appointed by the governor with advice and consent of the New Jersey Senate. The director serves during the term of office of the governor.

== Activities ==
=== Monitoring Casinos ===
DGE investigators monitor casino operations to find violations and assure regulatory compliance.

=== Licensing ===
As each casino owner is obliged to have a license, the Division investigates all of license applicants and reports results to the NJ Casino Control Commission. The commission conducts a public hearing to deny or grant a license. DGE has a list of licensed casinos in NJ that legal to operate in the state.

=== Regulatory Enforcement ===
The DGE and Regulatory Prosecutions Bureau are responsible for implementing the CCC Rules and Regulations and the laws of the Casino Control Act. Both Bureaus investigate and sue violations of the Act and Regulations.

=== Technical Services Bureau (TSB) ===
The Bureau assures the integrity of all electronic gaming equipment, including all slot machine operations. It tests and evaluates slot machines, analyzes, and verifies jackpot payouts.

== Related legislation ==
- 1977: Casino Control Act, P.L. 1970, c. 110

== See also ==
- Kevin F. O'Toole
- New Jersey Casino Control Commission
