= Ministry of Defence and Veterans Affairs =

The Ministry of Defence and Veterans Affairs may refer to:

- Ministry of Defence and Veterans Affairs (South Sudan)
- Ministry of Defence and Veterans Affairs (Uganda)

== See also ==
- Ministry of defence
