= Ministry of Internal Affairs (South Sudan) =

Government ministry of South Sudan

South Sudan Ministry of Interior
Department overview
- Formed: 2011
- Jurisdiction: South Sudan
- Headquarters: Juba
- Minister responsible: Aleu Ayieny Aleu, Minister of Interior

The Ministry of Interior is a ministry of the Government of South Sudan. The incumbent minister is Hon. Angelina Teny.

Part of the ministry are the police, fire brigade, and prison services.

== List of ministers of interior ==
Minister of Interior	In office	Party	President	Note(s)
Aleu Ayieny Aleu	July 2013–2023	Sudan People's Liberation Movement	Salva Kiir	First Minister of the Interior
Angela Teny	2023–present	Sudan People's Liberation Movement	Salva Kiir	First woman Minister of the Interior
