= NJAC =

NJAC is an abbreviation and may stand for:

- National Joint Action Committee, active Nationalist political party in Trinidad and Tobago
- New Jersey Administrative Code, a compendium of the regulations of the State of New Jersey, United States
- New Jersey Association of Counties, advocacy group for county governments in New Jersey, United States
- New Jersey Athletic Conference, NCAA Division III college athletics conference in New Jersey
- National Judicial Appointments Commission, India
