= Kevin F. O'Toole =

American lawyer

- Born: 1950 (age 75–76)
- Occupations: attorney gaming regulator

Kevin F. O'Toole (born 1950) is an American attorney and gaming regulator who was appointed the second Executive Director of the Pennsylvania Gaming Control Board in 2009.

== Career ==
O'Toole began his career as a Deputy Attorney General for the New Jersey Division of Gaming Enforcement. From 1997 to 2007 O'Toole served as the Executive Director for the Gaming Commission of the Oneida Indian Nation, which operates Turning Stone Casino in Verona, New York. He was appointed a Commissioner for the Nation in 2007. O'Toole assisted in the development of the Minimum Internal Control Standards (MICS) for the National Indian Gaming Commission. O'Toole also served as a member of the Tribal Relations Committee for the sport of Boxing and the Boxing Commission for the Oneida Indian Nation Athletic Commissions.

He was named the 2012 Regulator of the Year for the Americas, along with Mark Lipparelli, by the International Masters of Gaming Law in recognition of his contributions to gaming law.

== Publications ==
- Native American Casinos—Models of Regulatory Oversight (Fredric E. Gushin and Kevin F. O'Toole, 2007)

== Education ==
O'Toole is a graduate of the Wharton School of the University of Pennsylvania and Rutgers University Law School.
