= Chol Thon Balok =

South Sudanese politician and army general

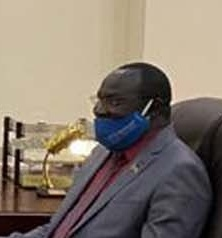
- Chol Thon Balok in 2021

Minister of Defence and Veterans’ Affairs
- Incumbent
- Assumed office March 2023
- President: Salva Kiir
- Preceded by: Angelina Teny

Personal details
- Born: Upper Nile State, South Sudan
- Occupation: Politician
- Profession: Army officer

Chol Thon Balok is a South Sudanese politician and army general who has served as the Minister of Defence and Veterans’ Affairs in the Government of South Sudan since March 2023.

== Career ==
Balok, a senior officer from Ngok Lual Yak of Baliet County in Upper Nile State, was appointed Minister of Defence and Veterans' Affairs in March 2023 following a presidential decree by Salva Kiir that removed opposition figure Angelina Teny from the post. The appointment was criticized by opposition groups as a violation of the 2018 peace agreement.

As minister, Balok was tasked with reorganizing the South Sudan People's Defence Forces (SSPDF) and implementing security reforms. President Kiir directed him to oversee civilian disarmament in Juba and strengthen command structures within the army.

In 2024, Balok emphasized strategic reforms aimed at stabilizing the country's security environment. Reports highlighted his efforts to reorganize the national army, improve welfare for military personnel, and advance the implementation of peace agreements.

In February 2025, Balok met with Indian defence minister Rajnath Singh in New Delhi to review defense cooperation between South Sudan and India, marking one of the country's most significant international military engagements.

== See also ==
- Government of South Sudan
- Ministry of Defence and Veterans Affairs (South Sudan)
- South Sudan People's Defence Forces
- Politics of South Sudan
