= New Jersey Register =

Government publication of New Jersey, US

The New Jersey Register is the official journal of the Government of New Jersey that contains information on proposed regulations and rulemaking activities. It is published semimonthly by the state's Office of Administrative Law. The first issue was printed and published by the New Jersey Law Journal on September 25, 1969.

== See also ==
- Federal Register
- Law of New Jersey
