= Ahmad Toyserkani Ravari =

Iranian judge and politician (1960–2020)

- احمد تویسرکانی
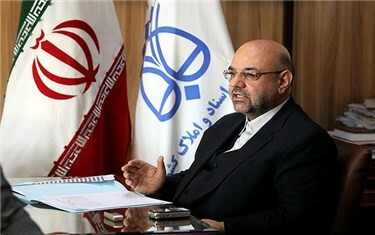
- Toyserkani in 2013
- Born: 20 July 1960; Ravar, Iran
- Died: 20 March 2020 (aged 59); Tehran, Iran

Ahmad Toyserkani Ravari (20 July 1960 – 3 March 2020) was an Iranian judge and politician. He served as Chief Justice of Kerman Province from 2006 to 2009, and later as Deputy Minister of Justice and Head of the State Organization for the Registration of Values and Properties of the Islamic Republic of Iran for ten years. He also served as an advisor to the head of the Iranian judiciary until his death.

As head of the State Organization for the Registration of Values and Properties, he implemented an important cadastral reform and oversaw the switch to digital registration of documents, which in 2015 had become the registration method for 86% of documents.

In 2012 Toyserkani was Vice Chairman of the Working Group on Spatially Enabled Government and Society of the Permanent Committee on Geographical Information System Infrastructure for Asia and the Pacific. In 2014 he participated in the Third High Level Forum on United Nations Global Geospatial Information Management; in the same year he was part of a delegation that visited the Moldovan State Agency on Intellectual Property (AGEPI) to gain experience from this authority in the administration of intellectual property protection system (particularly in the field of industrial design). Also in 2014, he denied that marriage of girls under 15 years of age were carried out in Iran, stating "No registry office has the right to register a marriage of a person less than 15 years of age. If this is observed, then it will be seriously dealt with. Till today, we do not have any registration of a marriage for individuals with less than the legal age". In 2015 he warned that there had been a 5% decrease in marriages and a 6% increase in divorces in Iran compared to the previous year.

In 2015 Toyserkani was part of a delegation that visited the Italian National Council of Notaries. In 2016 he brokered a memorandum on intellectual property between Iran and Italy. In 2018 he represented Iran at the Heads of Intellectual Property Office Conference (HIPOC) for Countries in South Asia, Southeast Asia, Iran and Mongolia, and in the same year he met a Danish delegation and planned co-operation between the two countries to secure the intellectual property rights of Danish companies in Iran.

Toyserkani died from COVID-19 on 3 March 2020, aged 59. He was one of the first confirmed victims of the pandemic in Iran.
