= Aleu Ayieny Aleu =

South Sudanese politician (born 1954)

Aleu Ayieny Aleu (born 1954) is a South Sudanese politician who has served as Minister of Interior of South Sudan since January 2026, succeeding Angelina Teny. He previously served in this between from 2013 to 2015.

In the 1980s he joined the Sudan People's Liberation Army. From 2005 to 2007 he was deputy minister of interior of Sudan.

Between January 2021 and November 2022 Aleu served as governor of Warrap.
