= Law of New Jersey =

The law of New Jersey consists of several levels, including constitutional, statutory, regulatory, case law, and local law.

== Sources ==
The Constitution of New Jersey is the foremost source of state law. Legislation is enacted by the New Jersey Legislature, published in the Laws of New Jersey, and codified in the New Jersey Statutes. State agency regulations (sometimes called administrative law) are published in the New Jersey Register and codified in the New Jersey Administrative Code. New Jersey's legal system is based on common law, which is interpreted by case law through the decisions of the Supreme Court, Appellate Division of the Superior Court, and Tax Court, which are published in the New Jersey Reports, New Jersey Superior Court Reports, and New Jersey Tax Reports, respectively. Counties and municipalities may also promulgate local ordinances.

=== Constitution ===
The foremost source of state law is the Constitution of New Jersey. The New Jersey Constitution in turn is subordinate to the Constitution of the United States, which is the supreme law of the land.

=== Legislation ===
Pursuant to the state constitution, the New Jersey Legislature has enacted legislation. Its session laws are published in the Acts of the Legislature of the State of New Jersey, commonly known as the Laws of New Jersey. They are in turn codified in the New Jersey Statutes (N.J.S.), also referred to as the Revised Statutes (R.S.). The New Jersey Statutes are published in the official New Jersey Statutes Annotated (N.J.S.A.) by West.

=== Regulations ===
Pursuant to certain statutes, state agencies have promulgated regulations, also known as administrative law. The New Jersey Register is the official journal of state agency rulemaking containing the full text of agency proposed and adopted rules, notices of public hearings, gubernatorial orders, and agency notices of public interest. The New Jersey Administrative Code (N.J.A.C.) is a compilation of all rules adopted by state agencies.

All state rulemaking notices are reviewed and processed by the Division of Administrative Rules within the New Jersey Office of Administrative Law for publication in the New Jersey Register, published twice a month. Following publication of adopted rules in the New Jersey Register, the rules are incorporated into the New Jersey Administrative Code. Both are published by LexisNexis. New Jersey Administrative Code updates are currently issued once a month.

=== Case law ===
The legal system of New Jersey is based on the common law. Like all U.S. states except Louisiana, New Jersey has a reception statute providing for the "reception" of English law. All statutes, regulations, and ordinances are subject to judicial review. Pursuant to common law tradition, the courts of New Jersey have developed a large body of case law through the decisions of the New Jersey Supreme Court, Appellate Division of the New Jersey Superior Court, New Jersey Tax Court and trial courts.

The published opinions of New Jersey's courts are contained in three different sets of books. The opinions of the New Jersey Supreme Court are contained in a collection of tan hardcover books called the New Jersey Reports. Significant opinions of the Appellate Division of the Superior Court, and the New Jersey trial courts, are contained in a set of green hardcover books called the New Jersey Superior Court Reports. And the opinions of the Tax Court are contained in blue hardcover books called the New Jersey Tax Court Reports.

== See also ==
=== Topics ===
- Alcohol laws of New Jersey
- Capital punishment in New Jersey
- Gambling in New Jersey
- Gun laws in New Jersey
- LGBT rights in New Jersey
- Taxation in New Jersey
- Environmental law in New Jersey

=== Other ===
- Politics of New Jersey
- Law enforcement in New Jersey
- Crime in New Jersey
- Law of the United States
