= Angelina Teny =

South Sudanese politician (born 1953)

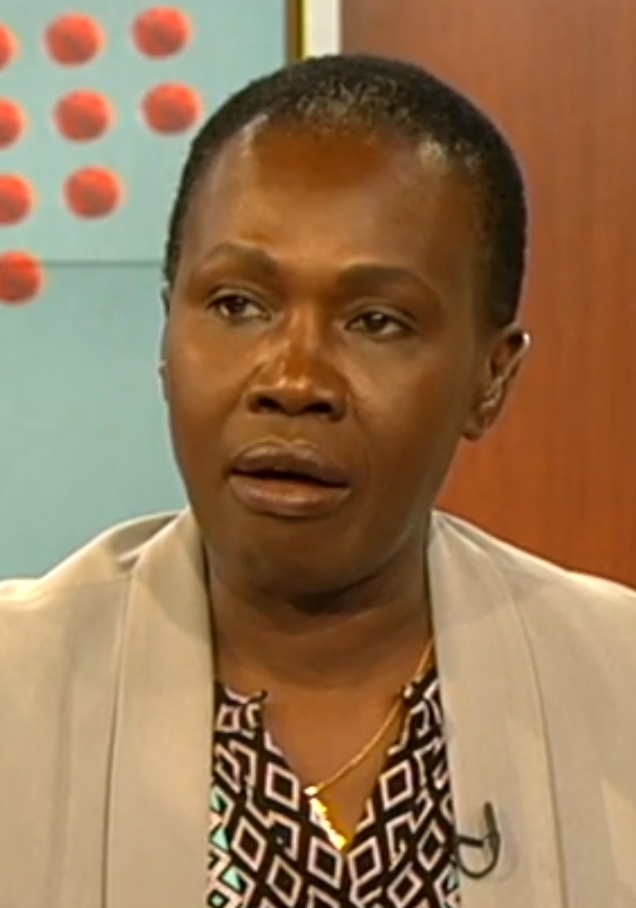
- Teny in 2016

South Sudanese Minister of Internal Affairs
- In office 2023 – 19 January 2026
- President: Salva Kiir
- Succeeded by: Aleu Ayieny Aleu

Minister of Defence and Veterans Affairs of South Sudan
- In office March 2020 – 5 April 2023
- President: Salva Kiir
- Preceded by: Kuol Manyang
- Succeeded by: Chol Thon Balok

South Sudanese Minister of Energy and Mining
- In office 2005–2010
- President: Salva Kiir

Personal details
- Born: Angela Jany
- Party: Sudan People's Liberation Movement
- Other political affiliations: Sudan People's Liberation Movement-in-Opposition
- Spouse: Riek Machar
- Children: 4

Military service
- Allegiance: SPLA, SPLA-Nasir, SPLA-IO
- Battles/wars: Second Sudanese Civil War; South Sudanese Civil War

Angelina Jany Teny is a South Sudanese politician who served as minister of defence from March 2020 until her dismissal on 5 April 2023. From 2023 to 2026, she became the minister of interior in the South Sudan Revitalized Peace Agreement of South Sudan, signed in 2018 to end the 5-year civil war that started in 2013.

She was previously a state minister of energy and mining in the Khartoum-based Government of National Unity between 2005 and 2010. She ran for election as governor of Unity State in April 2010 but was defeated in an election that she claimed was fraudulent.

== Early life and career ==
Teny was educated in Great Britain and speaks both English and Arabic fluently. In November 2003, she facilitated a conference of South Sudanese women on "The House of Nationalities" held in Lokichokio, with goal of fostering peace and national unity through recognition of diversity.

== State minister of energy and mining ==
The Second Sudanese Civil War formally ended in January 2005 with establishment of an autonomous Government of South Sudan (GOSS) and as a defined process to move towards a referendum on full independence. Teny was a state minister of energy and mining in the Khartoum-based Government of National Unity between 2005 and 2010. At the November 2006 conference on Oil and the Future of Sudan, held in Juba, she noted that there had been considerable controversy over the Ministry of Energy and Mining when the Government of National Unity was being formed. The oil industry had been developed during the civil war as a means to finance that war at great human cost and military concerns had dictated the structure of the industry. Now the government was struggling to organize the National Petroleum Commission (NPC) but the SPLM had confidence in the process.

She said "Sudan now has the opportunity to develop the oil sector in order to support the peace to ensure that unity is attractive to ensure that those aggrieved during war get redressed and to take our place in the modern world where oil is produced with social responsibility. Now is the time as a nation to put together a vision and strategy for the proper management of this strategic resource". She noted that contracts had to be reviewed, local people compensated and environmental issues addressed. The expansion of the oil production south into the vast Sudd wetlands protected under the international Ramsar Convention, raised significant challenges. In a 2007 interview she noted that oil production and sales figures were given to her ministry by the Chinese-led Greater Nile Production Company. The ministry had no way of checking for accuracy. She said: "We have an oil revenue calculation committee and every month, we look at the production and sales figures, and work out the figures for who takes what, Right now, those figures are just based on production and then shared between North and South. There isn't much trust that's why you hear complaints from South Sudan about the amounts they are getting. In October 2007 she said "GOSS [Government of Southern Sudan] is uncertain about the oil production figures released by the federal government and also feels that its quota is not fair. GOSS was not given any representation at the strategic stages of oil production and overseas marketing".

== April 2010 elections ==
In the April 2010 elections Teny broke from her party, the Sudan People's Liberation Movement, and ran as an independent candidate for Governor of Unity State. Her main challenger was the incumbent governor Taban Deng Gai. Early reports showed she was leading by a wide margin against the other six contestants.

The state electoral body announced that Taban Deng Gai won by 137,662 votes, beating Teny with 63,561 votes. The defeated parties said in a joint statement that there had been wide spread rigging and called for a review by the National Elections Commission. Angelina Teny said she would not accept or recognize the results. Teny detailed many irregularities, including ejection of observers, missing ballot boxes, vote counts in excess of the number of registered voters and so on. Her campaign leader was arrested when he and members of his team tried to enter the State High Elections Committee's office. Teny called on her supporters to be calm and avoid violence, which has been epidemic in Unity State, the main oil-producing area in South Sudan.

The Unity State governor Taban Deng later accused Teny and SPLM-DC Chairman Lam Akol of supporting Colonel Galwak Gai, who led a mutiny against the SPLM Army after the elections. Edward Lino, a member of the SPLM leadership, allegedly accused her of supporting insurgency in Unity State. In response, Angelina Teny said that she was filing a lawsuit against Edward Lino. Teny was said to have promised to appoint Gai as a county commissioner if she won the election, and he rebelled when he failed to obtain this position.

== Post-independence career ==
Teny was appointed adviser on petroleum matters to the cabinet of South Sudan's Energy and Mines Ministry, and was the leader of negotiations with the Khartoum government over ownership and management of oil assets. While attending an energy conference in Ghana in September 2011 she spoke on the state of the oil industry in South Sudan after two months of full independence. She said that management of oil resources was largely though not entirely being handled from the Sudan, and South Sudan was in control of most of its oil fields.Those fields that are producing had output of about 300,000 barrels per day.

Teny said the government had created the outline of a 3-year program to develop infrastructure. This included construction of an oil refinery to meet domestic needs. A new law to regulate the industry was almost ready to be published. South Sudan urgently needed capital to meet Millennium Development Goals and to build roads and pipelines. She said the oil companies were talking to the government which was reviewing existing contracts. More information was needed for Juba to be able to assess reserves.

On 26 March 2025, Teny, by then the interior minister, was arrested along with her husband, Vice President Riek Machar, at their residence in Juba. The South Sudanese government denied that she was being detained in a statement days later, saying that she was performing her duties normally.

On 19 January 2026, Teny was dismissed by President Kiir as interior minister for unspecified reasons.

== Personal life ==
Teny is married to Riek Machar, the first Vice President of South Sudan. They have four children.
