= New Jersey Department of Veterans Affairs =

State government agency

- Seal of the NJDVA

Department overview
- Formed: January 9, 2025; 22 months ago
- Jurisdiction: Government of New Jersey
- Headquarters: 101 Eggerts Crossing Road Lawrence Township, New Jersey
- Annual budget: $210.8 million FY2027
- Department executives: Vincent Solomeno, Commissioner; Esther Chucaralao, Deputy Commissioner
- Child agencies: Division of Veterans Services; Division of Veterans Healthcare Services; Division of Communications; Division of Employee Relations and Human Services; Division of Facilities Management; Fiscal Division; Administrative Services Division; Division of Information Services
- Website: www.nj.gov/dva/

The New Jersey Department of Veterans Affairs (NJDVA) is a principal department in the executive branch of the New Jersey government charged with administering state-run housing, healthcare, and other benefits for veterans and their eligible family members.

== History ==
There was no dedicated agency for overseeing veterans benefits in New Jersey until 1987 when all veterans services and programs were incorporated into the Department of Veterans Affairs and Defense, later renamed the Department of Military and Veterans Affairs. In response to high-profile lawsuits and controversies over mismanagement of state-run veterans homes during the COVID-19 pandemic, the Department of Veterans Affairs was created and the responsibility of administering state veterans benefits was transferred to it.

== Organization ==
The Department of Veterans Affairs is headed by a Commissioner of Veterans Affairs who is appointed by the Governor with the advice and consent of the Senate. The current Commissioner is Vincent Solomeno, who was confirmed by the Senate on February 24, 2026.

The department is composed of several divisions:

- Division of Veterans Services
- Division of Veterans Healthcare Services
- Division of Communications
- Division of Employee Relations and Human Services
- Division of Facilities Management
- Fiscal Services
- Administrative Services Division
- Division of Information Services

== Related legislation ==
- 2025: New Jersey Department of Veterans Affairs Act, P.L. 2025, c. 139
