= New Jersey Administrative Code =

The New Jersey Administrative Code (N.J.A.C.) is the codification of all rules and regulations made by the executive branch agencies of New Jersey.

Newly proposed rules are published for comment in the New Jersey Register, which is published twice a month. Once the new rules are officially adopted, they are published in the Code. Responsibility for the compilation, publication, and updating of the Code lies with the New Jersey Office of Administrative Law (OAL). All rules and regulations must be made in accordance with the New Jersey Administrative Procedure Act and the OAL's Rules for Agency Rulemaking.

== Titles ==
- Title 1. Administrative Law
- Title 2. Agriculture
- Title 3. Banking
- Title 4A. Civil Service
- Title 5. Community Affairs
- Title 5A. Military And Veterans' Affairs
- Title 6. Education
- Title 6A. Education
- Title 7. Environmental Protection
- Title 8. Health And Senior Services
- Title 9. Higher Education
- Title 9A. Higher Education
- Title 10. Human Services
- Title 10A. Corrections
- Title 11. Insurance
- Title 12. Labor And Workforce Development
- Title 12A. Commerce
- Title 13. Law And Public Safety
- Title 14. Public Utilities
- Title 14A. Energy
- Title 15. State
- Title 15A. Public Advocate
- Title 16. Transportation
- Title 17. Treasury -- General
- Title 18. Treasury -- Taxation
- Title 19. Other Agencies
- Title 19K. Casino Control Commission/Casino Reinvestment Development Authority

The appendices to the Code also contain tables correlating rules and statutes, the executive orders of the State's governors, and a definition table.

== See also ==
- Law of New Jersey
- Code of Federal Regulations
- United States administrative law
