= New Jersey Office of Administrative Law =

American government agency

The New Jersey Office of Administrative Law (OAL) is the state administrative law agency responsible for publishing the New Jersey Register and the New Jersey Administrative Code pursuant to the New Jersey Administrative Procedure Act. In addition, administrative law judges (ALJ) of the OAL hold trial-type hearings involving state agencies and the enforcement of agency regulations. OAL hearings are held in Newark, Atlantic City, and the Trenton area (Mercerville, Hamilton Township). Although typically initial decisions of OAL ALJ's may be adopted, modified, or rejected by agency heads, the reasons for modifying or rejecting a decision must be specified in writing and supported by evidence. A final agency decision may be appealed to the New Jersey Superior Court, Appellate Division.
