= Ministry of Defence and Veterans Affairs (South Sudan) =

Government ministry of South Sudan

South Sudan Ministry of Defence and Veterans Affairs
Department overview
- Formed: 2011
- Jurisdiction: South Sudan
- Headquarters: Juba
- Minister responsible: Chol Thon Balok, Minister of Defence and Veterans Affairs
- Website: https://modva-rss.com/

The Ministry of Defence and Veterans Affairs is a ministry of the Government of South Sudan. The incumbent minister is Chol Thon Balok who assumed the post on 30 March 2023.

== List of ministers ==
=== Ministers of SPLA and Veteran Affairs ===
- Dominic Dim Deng, 2007 - May 2008
- Nhial Deng Nhial, December 2008 - July 2011

=== Ministers of Defence and Veteran Affairs ===
- Nhial Deng Nhial, July 2011 - August 2011
- John Kong, August 2011 - 2013
- Kuol Manyang, 2013 - March 2020
- Angelina Teny, March 2020 - 3 March 2023
- Chol Thon Balok, 30 March 2023 - Incumbent
