= List of festivals in New Jersey =

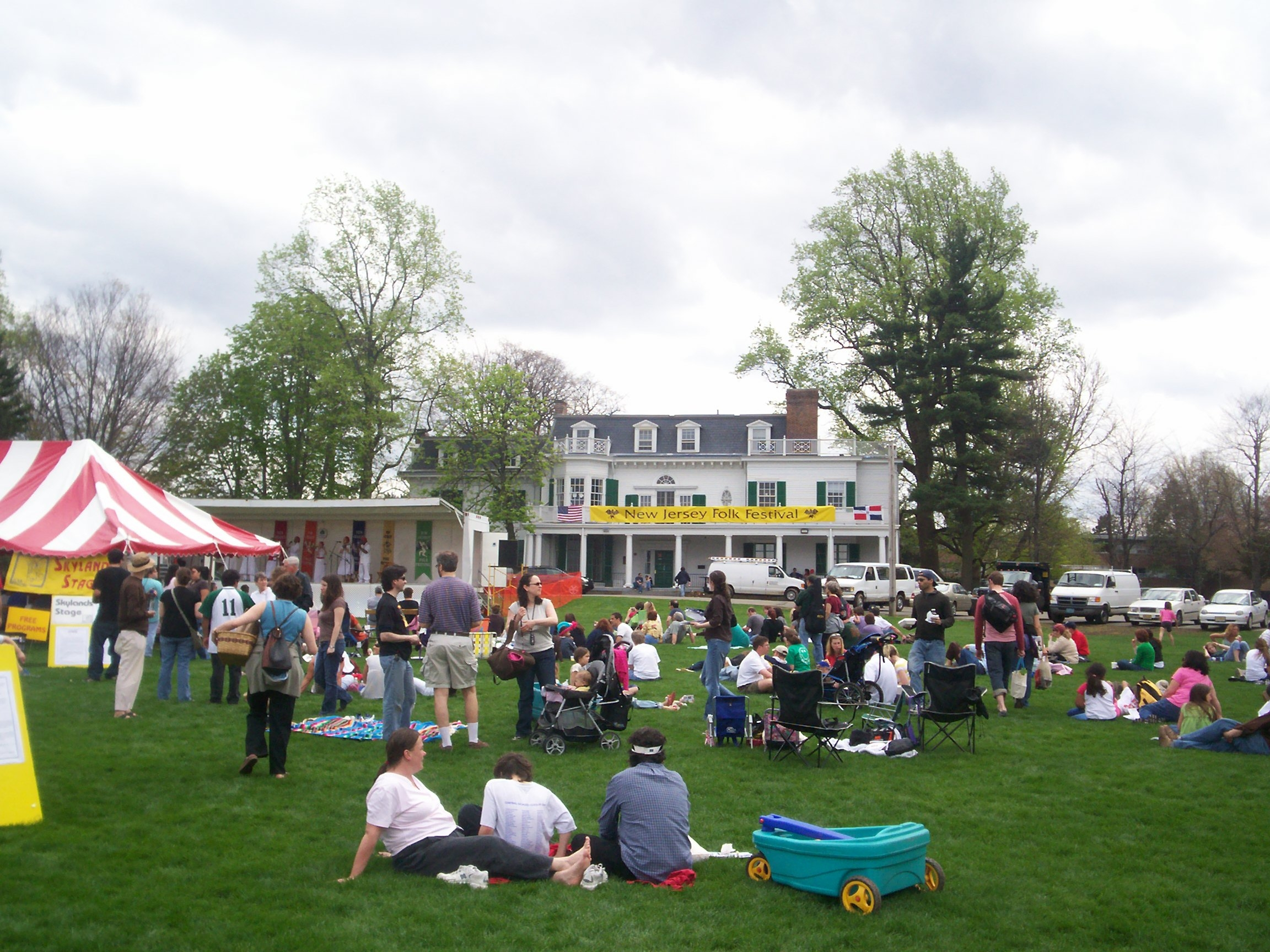
New Jersey Folk Festival on April 27, 2007

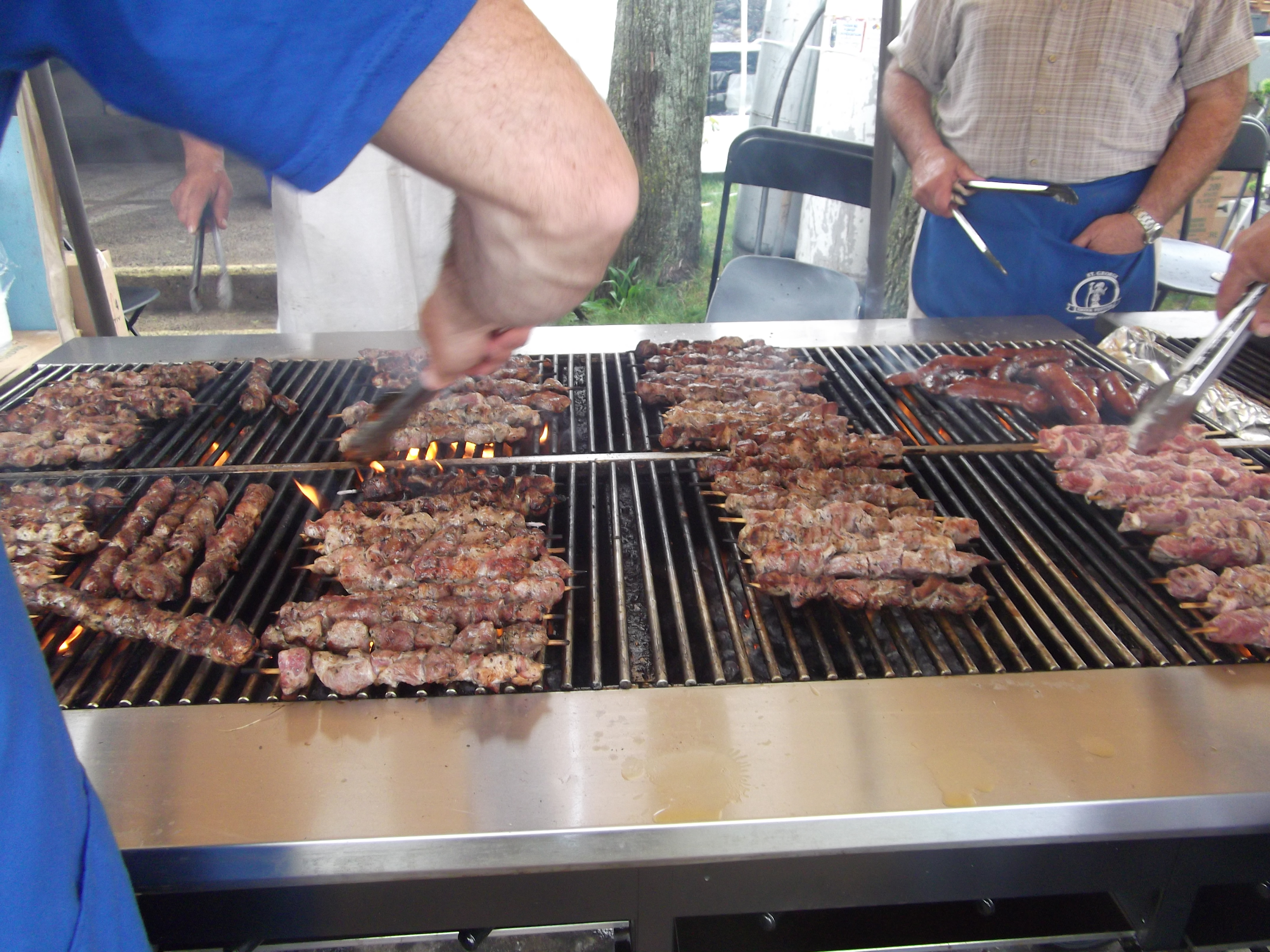
Souvlaki grilling at the 2011 Greek Festival in Piscataway on May 15, 2011

This is a list of festivals in New Jersey.

== January ==
- KotoriCon - anime convention at Gloucester County College

== February ==
- Black Maria Film Festival

== March ==
- Garden State Film Festival
- Jersey City Chili Cookoff

== April ==
- Branch Brook Park Cherry Blossom Festival
- International Festival - Princeton University
- Lambertville Shad Festival
- Newark LGBTQ Film Festival
- Rock & Roll Steampunk Festival, Washington Borough, Warren County
- Rutgers Day in New Brunswick, held on the last Saturday of April
- Exit Zero Jazz Festival (spring)
- Trenton Computer Festival

== May ==
- Annual Greek Festival - Greek Orthodox Church of St. George in Piscataway, held the weekend after Mother's Day; the state's and longest running Greek festival
- Crayfish Festival - Augusta - Sussex County Fairgrounds
- Hoboken Arts and Music Festival
- Jersey Shore Music Festival - Seaside Heights
- Montclair Film Festival - film festival in Montclair
- Munchmobile Hot Dog Showdown & Beer Festival - Monmouth Park Racetrack in Oceanport
- NJ Greek Fest (The New Jersey Greek Festival) - Holy Trinity Greek Orthodox Church in Westfield, held the first weekend after Memorial Day
- New Jersey State History Festival - Washington Crossing State Park, held the first weekend in May
- Raritan River Music Festival
- Buena Spring Festival & Tunnel to Towers Benefit Car, Truck & Motorcycle Show https://www.facebook.com/events/2776589549363931?active_tab=about

== June ==
- North to Shore festival
- AnimeNEXT - anime convention in Atlantic City
- Barefoot Country Music Festival (Wildwood, New Jersey, on the beach)
- Beardfest Music & Arts Festival - NJ Pinelands National Reserve
- Belmar Seafood Festival
- Big Greek Festival - Randolph June 7–9
- Celtic Festival - Historic Cold Spring Village in Cape May
- Cuban Parade of New Jersey
- Flemington OPA Festival - St. Anna Greek Orthodox Church
- Jersey Pride, the New Jersey State Pride Parade (typically first Sunday in June) Asbury Park, New Jersey
- Hoboken Film Festival
- Hungarian Festival - New Brunswick
- Jersey Shore Wine Festival - FirstEnergy Park, Lakewood, June 2 and 3
- McDonald's Gospelfest
- Meadowlands State Fair Mid-June through Early July
- New Jersey Film Festival
- NJ Playwrights Festival
- Point Pleasant Summerfest in the Park - June 3
- Portugal Day Festival in Newark
- Sustainably Green Music & Arts Festival, Washington Borough, Warren County
- Tri-County Fair (Thursday-Sunday Father's Day weekend)

== July ==
- Afro Beat Fest
- Pleasantville, New Jersey Colombia Festival - Orgullo Colombiano
- FARM Music & Arts Festival - Vernon, July 24–26
- Lincoln Park Music Festival - Newark
- Macy's Fireworks Spectacular - Independence Day
- Meadowlands State Fair Mid-June through Early July, with fireworks on July 3 and 4
- Quick Chek New Jersey Festival of Ballooning - Thor Solberg Road in Readington, held the last weekend of July
- Roselle House Music Festival
- Shakespeare Theatre of New Jersey Outdoor Stage
- Soulsational Music Festival - Jersey Shore, held the last Saturday in July
- Sourland Mountain Festival in the Sourlands
- St. Ann's Feast - Hoboken
- XPoNential Music Festival

== August ==
- Chillfest
- Crab Cake Festival & Shore Chef Cook-Off - Monmouth Park Racetrack in Oceanport
- Hambletonian Stakes
- Highlands Clam Festival - Highlands, held in the first week of August
- Jersey City Pride
- Monmouth Film Festival
- New Jersey State Fair
- Newark Black Film Festival
- Philippine Fiesta - Meadowlands Exposition Center
- Quick Chek New Jersey Festival of Ballooning
- TidalWave Music Festival (Atlantic City, New Jersey)

== September ==
- Union County Celtic Festival in Oak Ridge Park in Clark, New Jersey (inaugural event scheduled for September 9, 2023)
- BBQ, Bets & Brews Festival - Monmouth Park Racetrack in Oceanport
- Festival in the Borough, Washington NJ, Warren County
- First Annual Roseland Greek Festival - St. Nicholas, Constantine and Helen Greek Orthodox Church
- Flemington OPA Festival - St. Anna Greek Orthodox Church
- Garden State Country Music & Food Truck Festival - Bader Airfield in Atlantic City
- Jazz & Roots Music Festival at Kean University (Hillside, NJ).
- Liberty Jazz Festival
- Montclair Jazz Festival
- New Jersey Independent South Asian Cine Fest - New Brunswick
- Rib Rock, featuring B.B. King - PNC Bank Arts Center
- South Mountain International Blues Festival - South Mountain Reservation in West Orange
- Water and Wings Festival
- Youth Dance Festival of New Jersey
- Just Be You Performing Arts Film & Theater Festival
- Weequahic Park House Music Festival

== October ==
- AnimeNEXT
- Dia De Los Muertos Day of the Dead Celebration, Washington Borough, Warren County
- Festival of Fine Craft, Millville, New Jersey - Millville, on the first weekend in October
- Geraldine R. Dodge Poetry Festival
- Golden Door Film Festival
- Lima Bean Festival - West Cape May, on October 6
- MangaNEXT
- German American Volkvest
- Exit Zero Jazz Festival (autumn edition)

== November ==
- Teaneck International Film Festival
- James Moody Jazz Festival

== December ==
- First Nights - celebrated on New Year's Eve, found throughout the state, including Montclair

== Other ==
- The Bank of America New Jersey Fresh Seafood Festival - Atlantic City
- Cape May Strawberry Festival
- Navratri - India Square
- Slow Food Festival
- Ukrainian Festival

== See also ==
- List of film festivals in New Jersey
