= North to Shore Festival =

Festival held in New Jersey, US

- Status: Active
- Genre: Art, music, comedy, film, and technology
- Date: Three weeks in June
- Frequency: Annually
- Locations: The three New Jersey cities of Asbury Park, Atlantic City, and Newark
- Years active: 2023–present
- Inaugurated: June 7, 2023
- Website: northtoshore.com

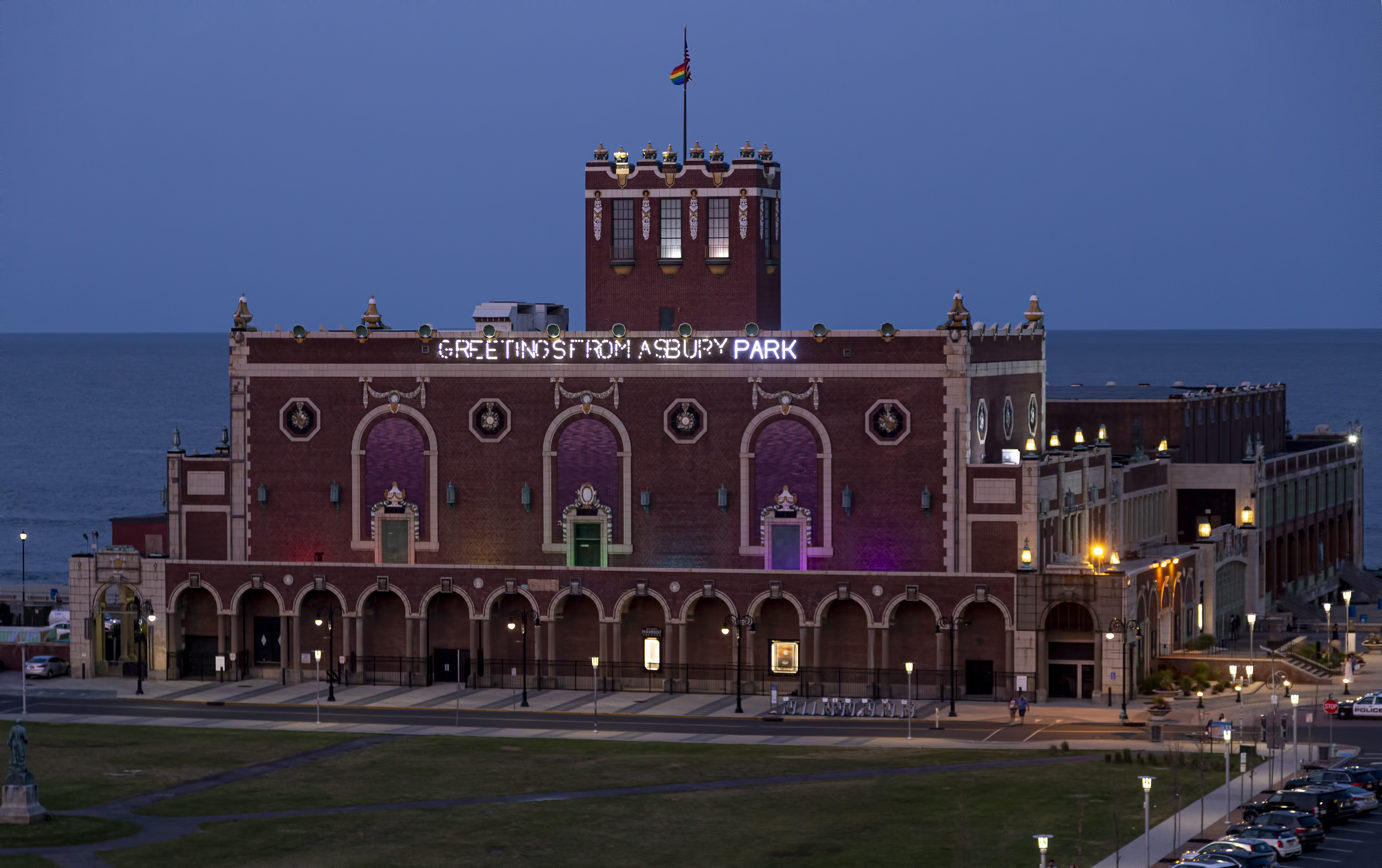
Paramount Theatre at Asbury Park Convention Hall at nightfall with the Atlantic Ocean behind it

The North to Shore Festival (aka North to Shore Arts and Ideas Festival, North to Shore, North2Shore, or N2S) is an annual three-week-long music, comedy, film and technology festival in New Jersey. The event is hosted in June by three New Jersey cities: Atlantic City, Asbury Park, and Newark.

== Background ==
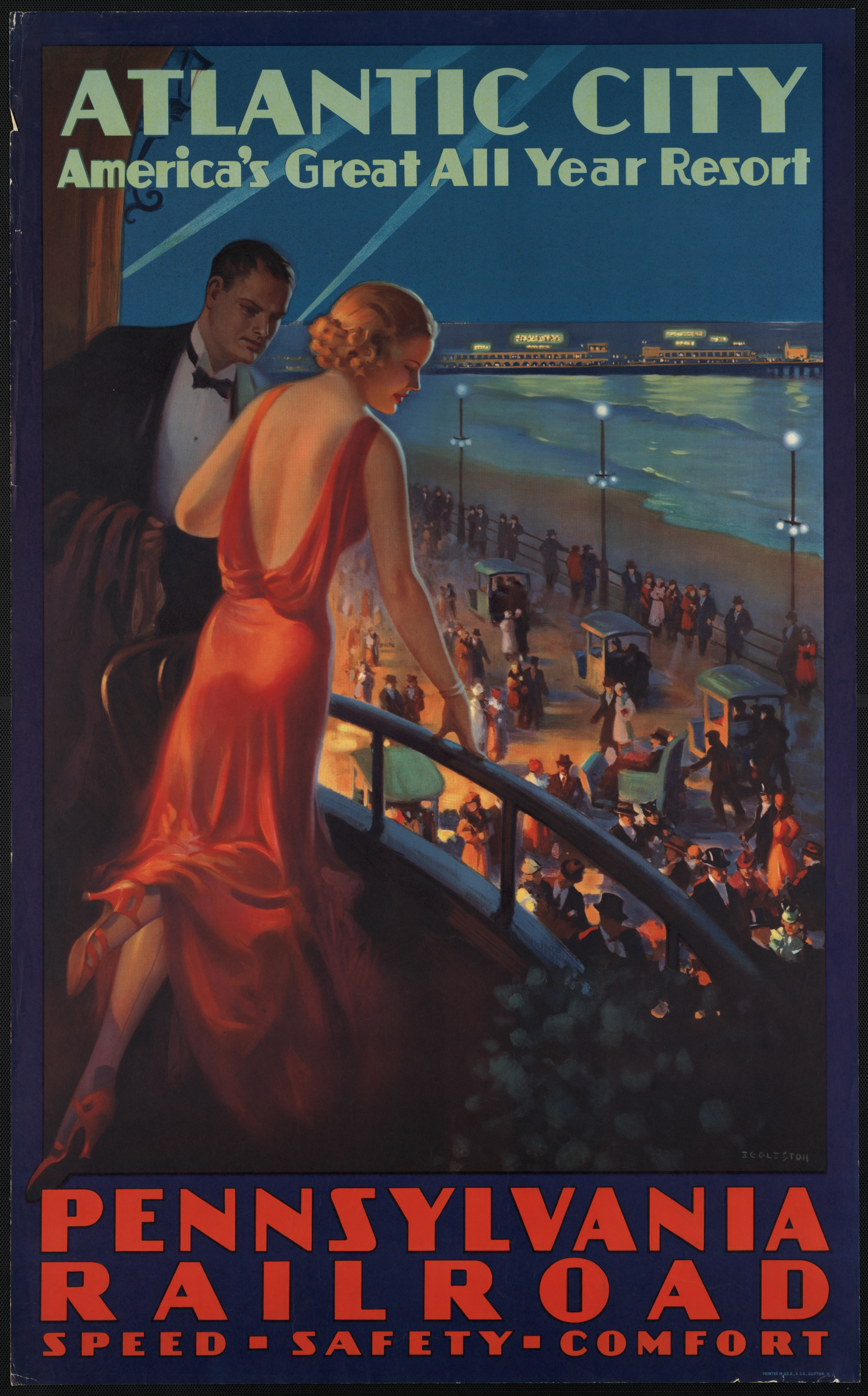
1930s Atlantic City promotional art by Edward Mason Eggleston

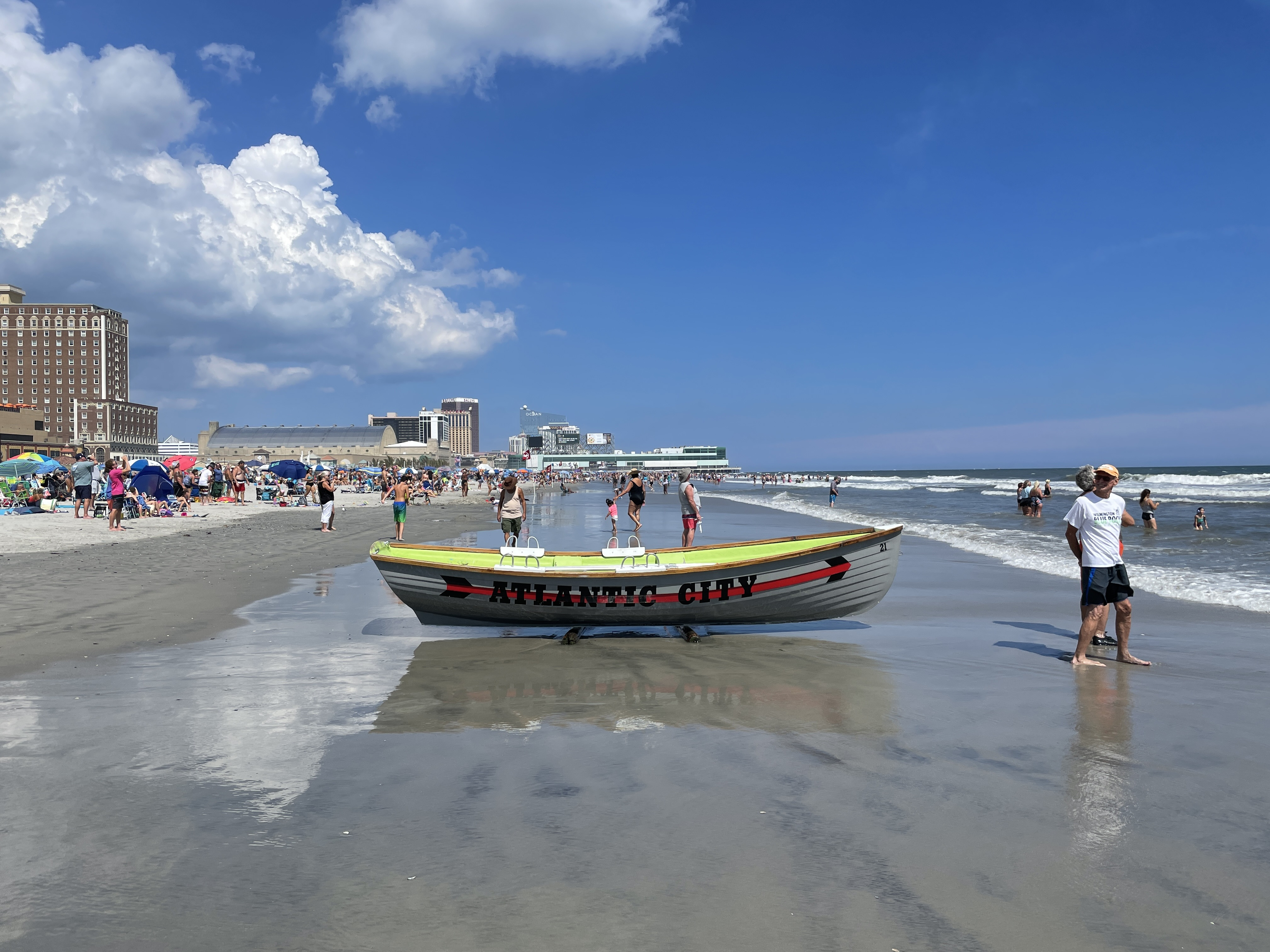
Atlantic City beach, looking north at Chelsea Avenue

The North to Shore Festival is produced by, among others, the New Jersey Performing Arts Center, SJ Presents, Madison Marquette, Live Nation Entertainment, Platinum Productions and Absolutely Live!

In announcing the festival, inaugurated in 2023, Governor Phil Murphy stated that the event was inspired by SXSW in Texas and intended to showcase the vibrant arts scene and inclusive cultural environment in New Jersey.

== Venues ==
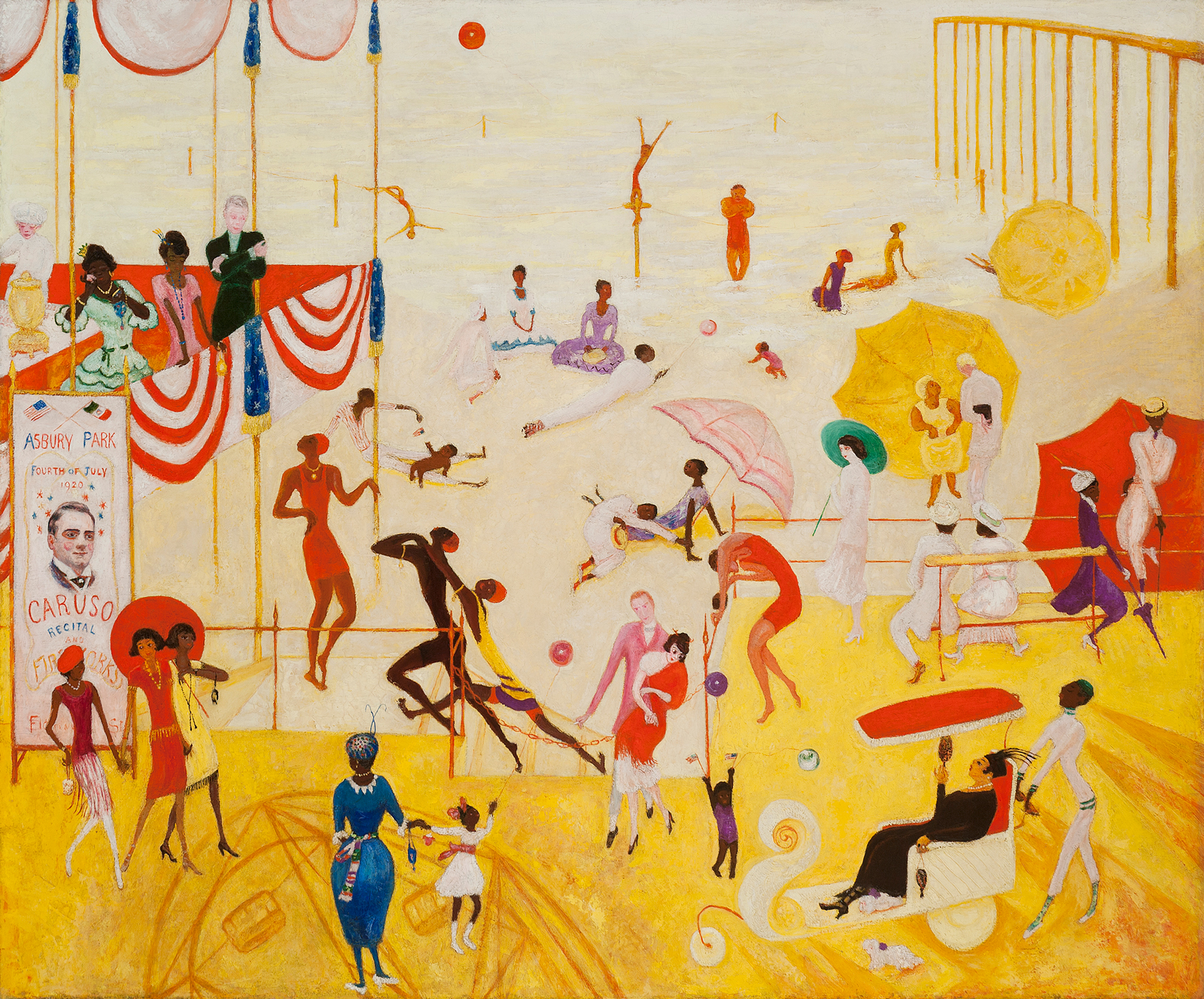
Asbury Park South, a 1920 painting by Jazz Age artist Florine Stettheimer depicting a summer crowd and sign for Enrico Caruso live. The artist is under a green parasol and her friends also appear. Artist Marcel Duchamp (in pink) is with actress Fania Marinoff. Carl Van Vechten stands upper left (black suit), Avery Hopwood (white suit) talks with a woman in yellow, and the Swiss painter Paul Thévanaz (red) bends over a camera.

Due to the density of its population, its location between two major metropolitan cities drawing touring acts, its reputation as an artist-friendly cultural environment and its long history as a summer beach resort for the middle and working classes, New Jersey historically had a relatively large number of entertainment venues, and has continued to invest heavily in the performing arts in the present.

Asbury Park N2S venues have included: The Paramount Theatre, The Stone Pony, House of Independents, the Convention Hall Arcade, Asbury Lanes, Wonder Bar, the Carousel Building, the Turf Club, the Saint, the Asbury Park boardwalk, Asbury Book Collective, and Georgies.

Atlantic City N2S venues have included: the Hard Rock, Ocean, the Trop, Resorts Superstar Theater, Caesars, Boardwalk Hall, Anchor Rock Club, the Atlantic City Boardwalk, Tennessee Avenue Beer Hall, Bader Field, Rhythm & Spirits, Chicken Bone Beach at ACX1 Studios, Dante Hall Theater, Rainbow Beach, Noyes Arts Garage, and Union Hall Arts.

Newark N2S venues have included: the Prudential Center, the Newark Museum of Art, the New Jersey Performing Arts Center, Weequahic Park, Newark Symphony Hall, Bethany Baptist Church, Halsey Street, Newark jazz club Clement's Place, Military Park, the recently restored Krueger-Scott mansion, Branch Brook Park, Harriet Tubman Square, Ferry Street (the main thoroughfare in the Ironbound), and the Newark Public Library.

== 2026 ==
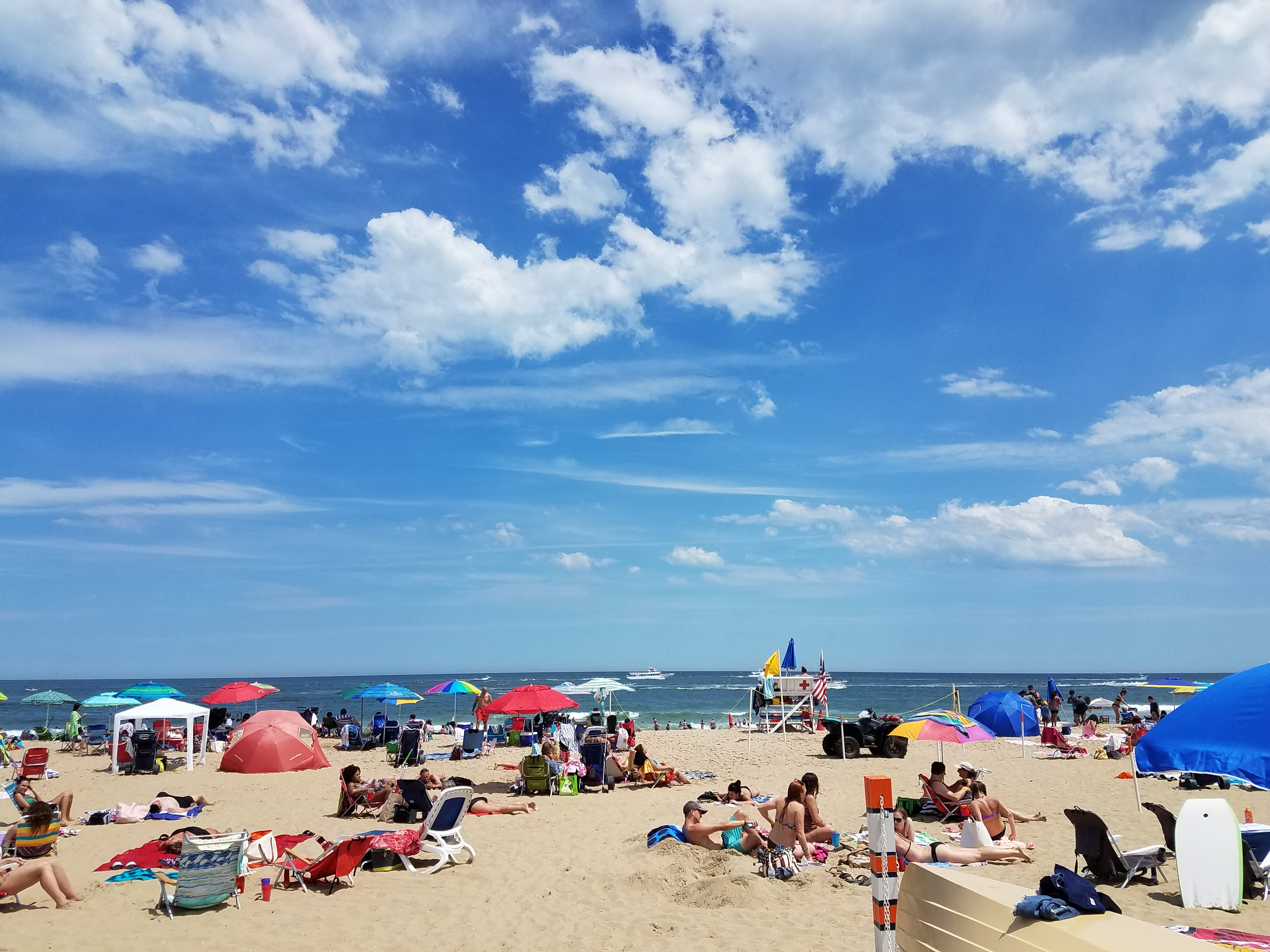
An Asbury Park beach

=== Music ===
- Alison Krauss & Union Station
- The Black Crowes & Whiskey Myers
- Black Flamingos & Yawn Mower
- The Bouncing Souls
- Brian Fallon
- Dark Star Orchestra
- Delta Sleep
- Eddie 9V
- The Head and the Heart
- Horse The Band
- Hot Mulligan with Joyce Manor
- Janelle Monáe
- Jesse & Joy
- Jimmy Eat World
- Joe Bonamassa
- Kurt Vile & The Violators
- LaMP
- Mihali
- The Ocean Blue
- October London & Eric Benét
- Primus, Les Claypool's Frog Brigade & The Claypool Lennon Delirium
- René Vaca
- Streetlight Manifesto
- Sublime, The Movement, Pepper & Codefendants
- Yellowcard, New Found Glory & Plain White T's

=== Comedy ===
- Eric D'Alessandro
- Earthquake's Father's Day Comedy Show
- Gary Gulman
- Iliza Shlesinger
- Jessica Kirson
- Jordan Jensen
- Lucas Zelnick
- Marc Maron
- Zarna Garg

== 2025 ==
=== Comedy ===
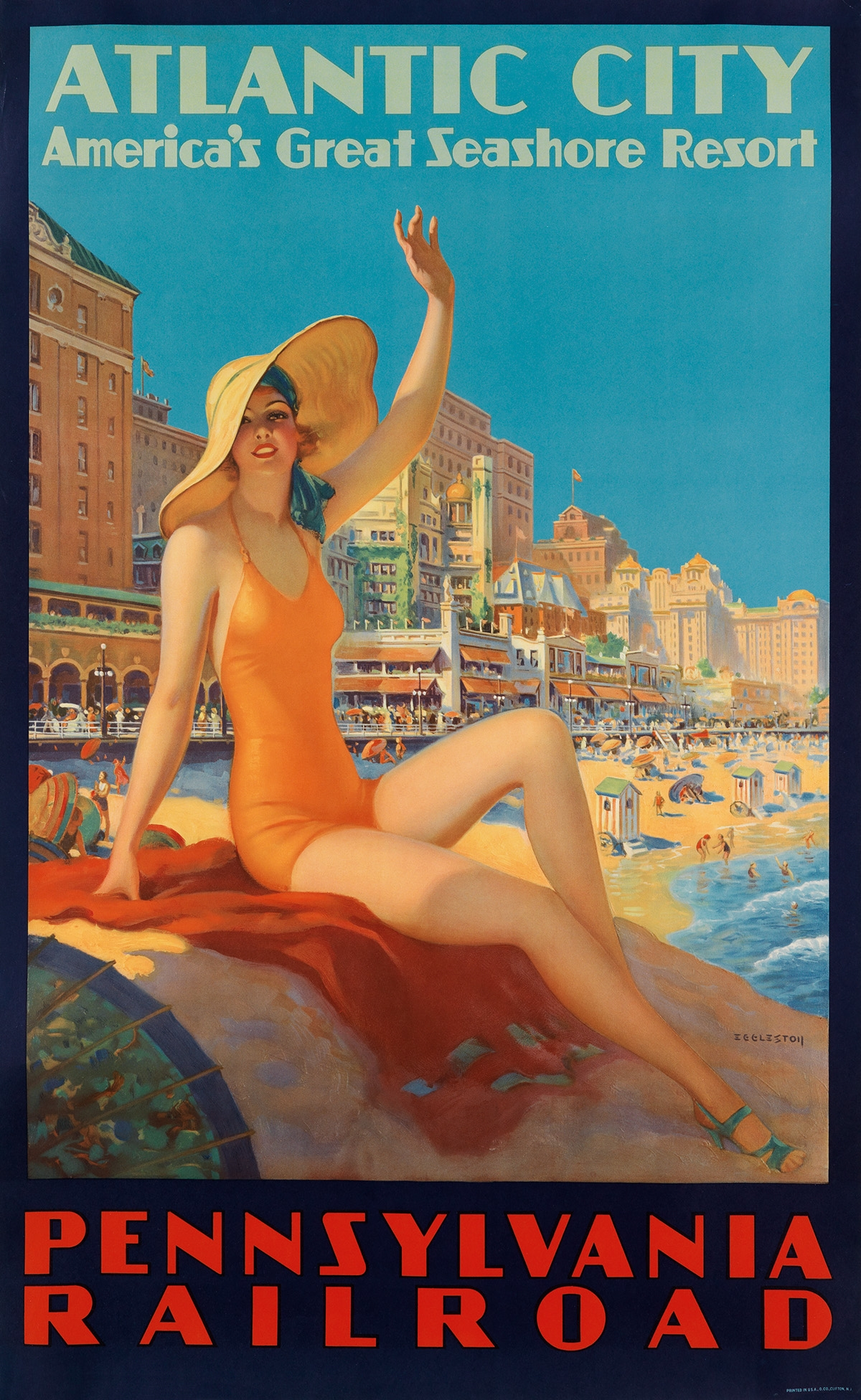
1935 promotional poster by Edward M. Eggleston

- Amy Poehler
- Bassem Youssef
- Jon Stewart
- John Mulaney
- Joey Diaz
- Josh Johnson
- Kumail Nanjiani
- Kym Whitley
- Martin Amini
- Nicole Byer
- Pete Davidson
- Rosebud Baker
- Tina Fey
- Sherri Shepherd

=== Music ===
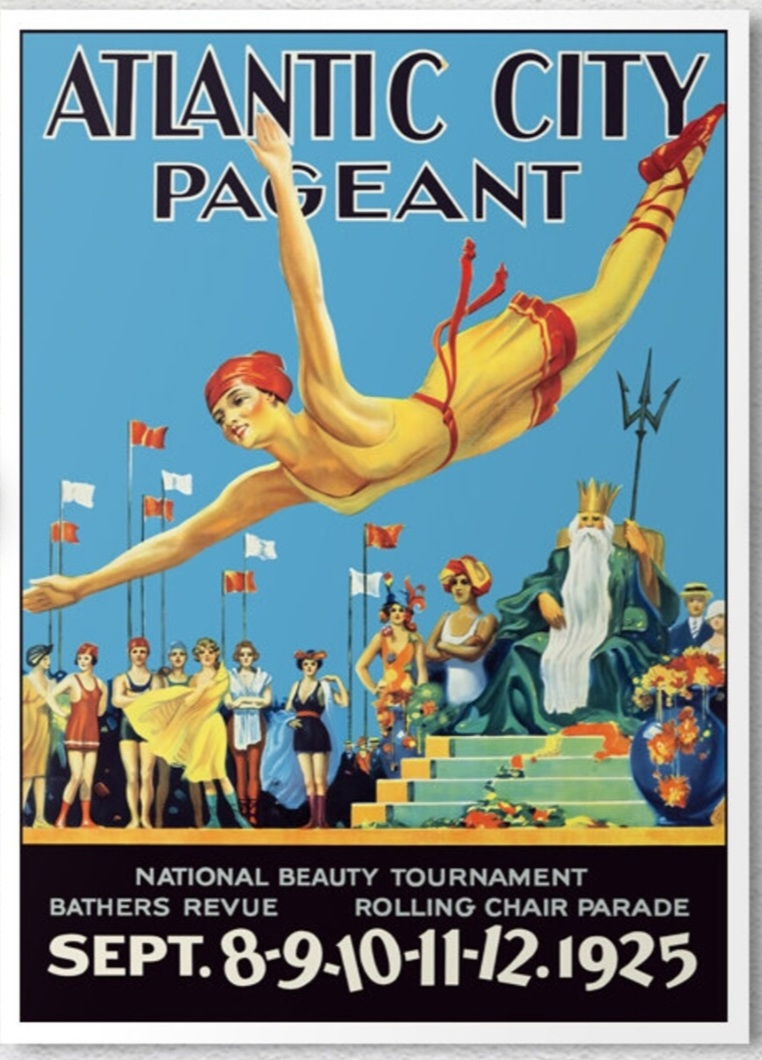
1925 pageant poster, Atlantic City

- Allen Stone
- April May Webb
- Big Daddy Kane
- Bleachers
- Felix Hernandez
- George Clinton
- Parliament Funkadelic
- Gregory Porter
- Jack's Mannequin
- Lawrence
- Lettuce
- Living Colour
- LL Cool J
- Parlor Mob
- Natalia Lafourcade
- Natasha Bedingfield
- Slightly Stoopid
- Stone Temple Pilots
- The String Cheese Incident
- Third Eye Blind
- Stars
- Streetlight Manifesto

=== Events scheduled for 2025 ===
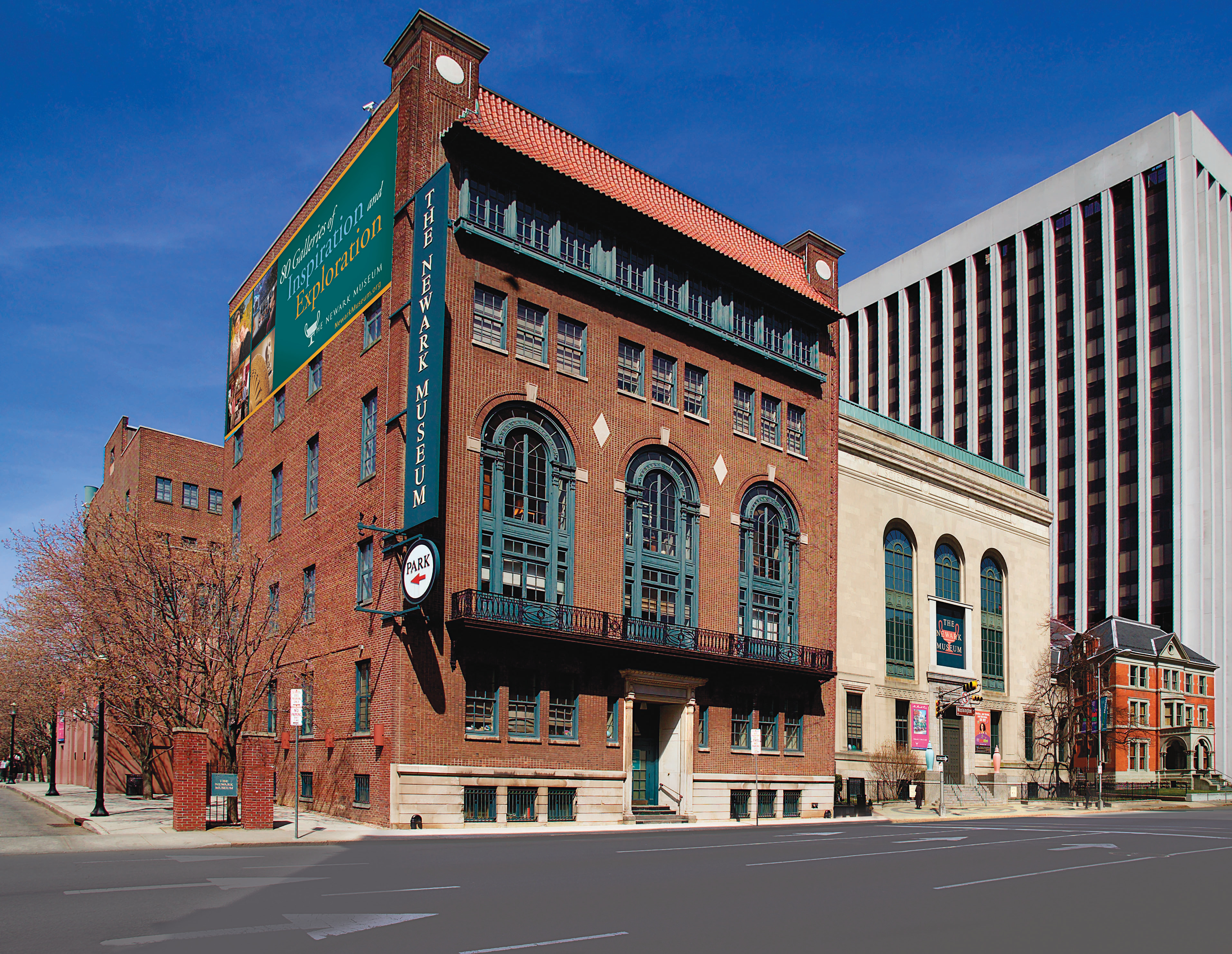
The Newark Museum of Art, founded in 1909

- Montclair Film will host events
- Hot 97 Summer Jam
- Newark International Film Festival
- Rock The Bells
- Yogi Fest by Ty Daye powered by Lincoln Park Music Festival

== History ==
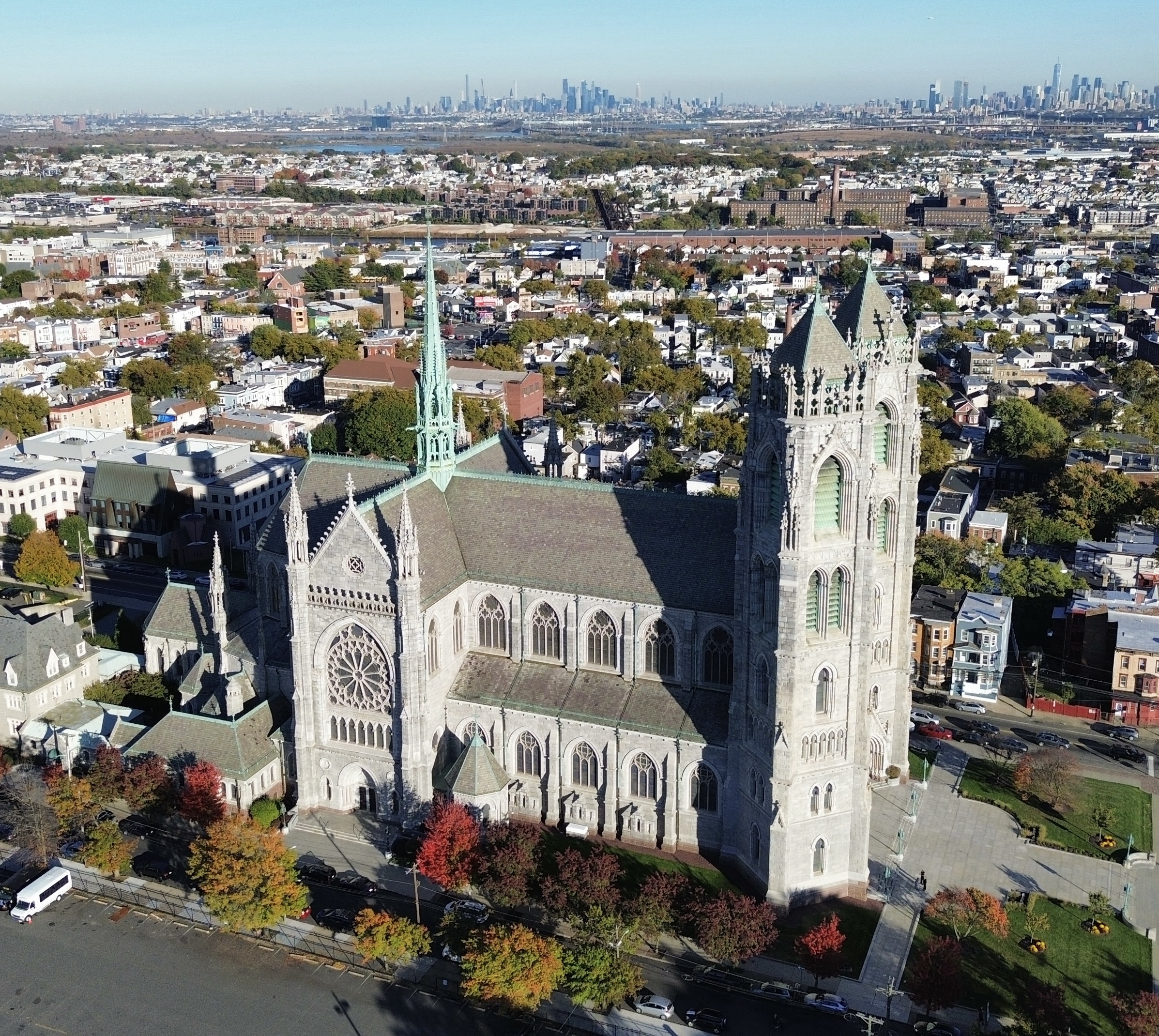
Newark's Cathedral Basilica of the Sacred Heart in aerial view looking east with New York City in the background. Many art historians consider the cathedral's stained glass to be the second finest in the world, after the Chartres Cathedral.

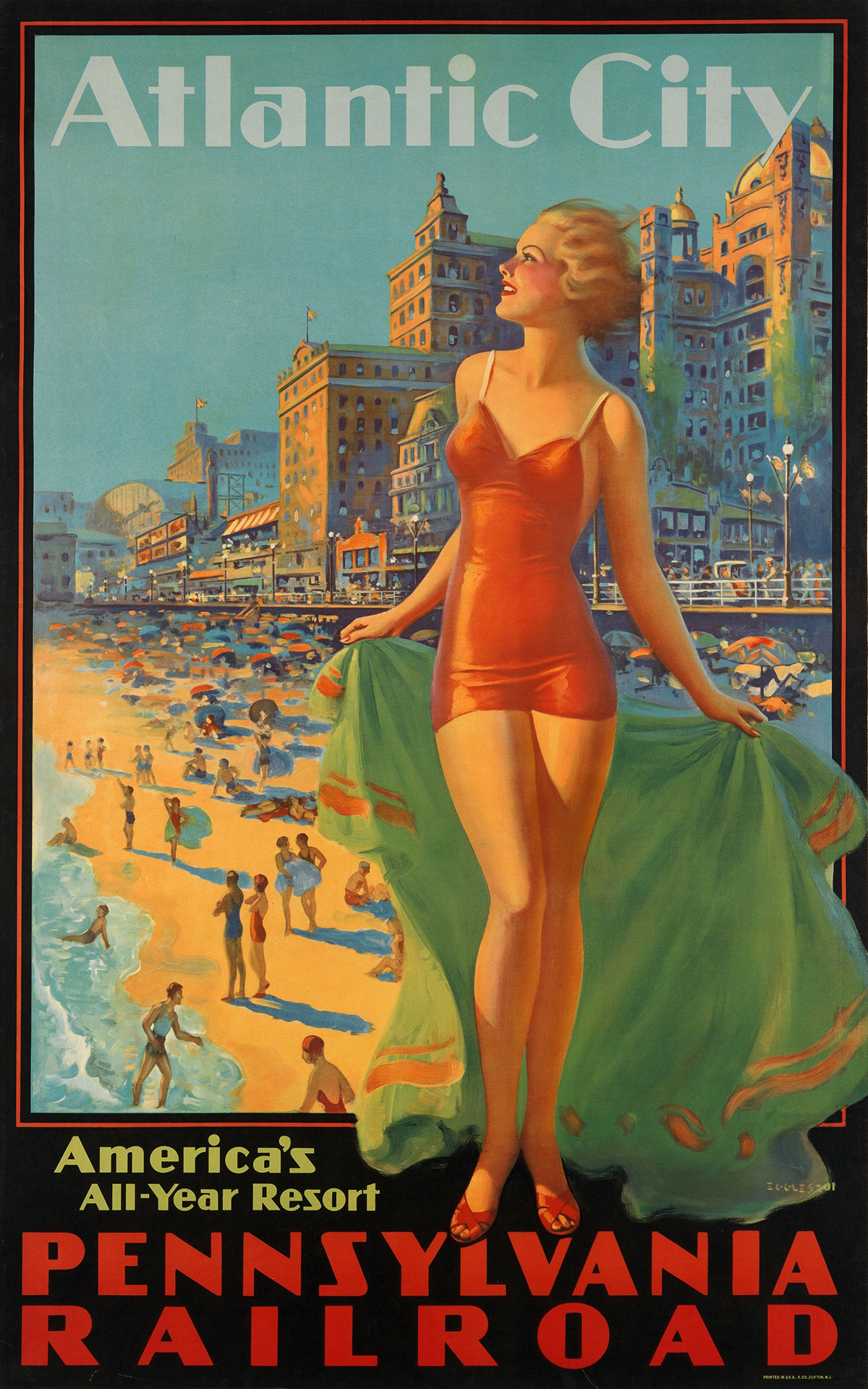
A 1930s Atlantic City promotional painting by Edward Mason Eggleston.

=== 2024 ===
In March 2024, in addition to dozens of smaller events in each city conducted by local performers, artists, and thinkers, N2S announced its June 2024 featured line-up in each of the three cities:

==== Comedy ====
- Kevin Hart
- Gabriel Iglesias
- Stephen Colbert
- Kevin Smith
- Sheng Wang
- Sam Morril
- Sommore
- Chris DiStefano
- Yannis Pappas
- Zarna Garg
- Justin Silva

==== Music ====
- Matchbox Twenty
- The B-52s
- Barenaked Ladies
- Frankie Valli
- Gary Clark Jr.
- Bleachers
- Jeezy
- Scarface
- Lake Street Dive
- Prince Royce
- Wisin
- Band of Horses
- Keyshia Cole
- Brothers Osborne
- K. Michelle
- Trey Songz
- Samara Joy
- Jaheim
- Kurt Vile and The Violators
- Eric Roberson
- AverySunshine
- Dramarama
- A Day to Remember

==== Film, technology and other arts ====
The Newark International Film Festival and Montclair Film provided film programming. TechUnited:NJ hosted more than 5,000 attendees at the Propelify Innovation Festival on technology during the festival. Stockton University managed a series of e-sports competitions and soccer programming in Atlantic City as part of Atlantic City week.

=== 2023 ===
The 2023 festival was held in Atlantic City (June 7–11), Asbury Park (June 14–18). and Newark (June 21–25) It drew an audience of nearly 250,000 to more than 300 shows.

During the festival planning process, organizers asked local creators to submit ideas for events. The festival sought "local producers or presenters of music, comedy, dance, theater or visual art in Atlantic City, Asbury Park or Newark." Certain creators were to be awarded stipends of up to $5,000 to execute their concepts.

The announced 2023 N2S lineup included:

==== Music ====
- Halsey
- The B52s
- Demi Lovato
- Ricardo Arjona
- Natalie Merchant
- Nicole Atkins
- Jazmine Sullivan
- Ari Lennox
- Alanis Morissette with special guest Aimee Mann
- Santana

Additional acts included Anthony Krizan (formerly of Spin Doctors), Eric B. & Rakim, Brian Fallon of Gaslight Anthem, Gavin DeGraw, Jay Wheeler, Low Cut Connie, Marisa Monte, Remember Jones, The Smithereens and Southside Johnny.

A tribute concert in honor of the music and life of Clarence Clemons also was held at 2023 N2S.

==== Comedy ====
- Bill Burr
- Stephen Colbert
- Jim Gaffigan
- Ross Mathews
- Ben Bailey

==== Film, technology and other arts ====
Film screenings were held at Dante Hall in the Ducktown section of Atlantic City during the festival, curated by Montclair Film, a nonprofit organization in the New Jersey film community. Investor Daymond John of Shark Tank was scheduled to speak at the festival in Newark. The annual Newark International Film Festival was also scheduled to take place during N2S.

The Newark International Film Festival was scheduled to host a "From Hip Hop to Hollywood" conversation at N2S with Newark councilman and Lords of the Underground alum Dupré "DoItAll" Kelly, speaking with Redman, Ludacris and Lady London.

Television presenter and science communicator Bill Nye of Bill Nye the Science Guy was to speak at Asbury Lanes during the festival.

== See also ==
- New Jersey music venues by capacity
- The Aquarian Weekly
- Music of Asbury Park
- Nightclubs in Atlantic City
- James Moody Jazz Festival
- New Jersey Motion Picture & Television Commission
- New Brunswick, New Jersey music scene
- Bruce Springsteen Center for American Music at Monmouth University
