= TidalWave Music Festival =

Country music festival held in Atlantic City, NJ, US

- Status: Active
- Genre: Country music
- Frequency: Annually
- Locations: On the beach in Atlantic City. One Atlantic Ocean, Atlantic City, NJ 08401.
- Years active: 2022–present
- Inaugurated: August 2022
- Sponsor: Live Nation
- Website: tidalwavefest.com

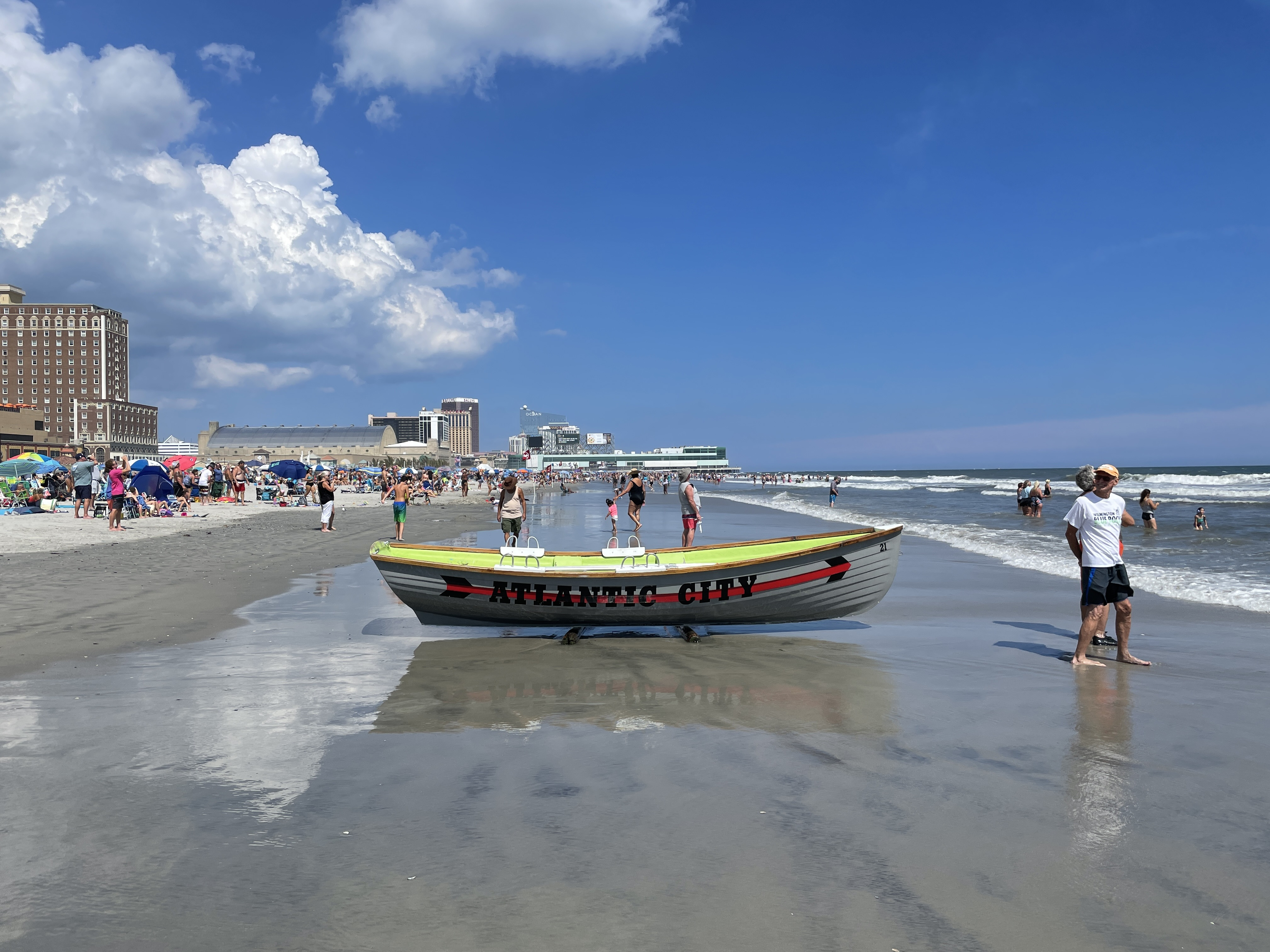
Atlantic City beach looking north at Chelsea Avenue

The TidalWave Music Festival is a country music festival held beachfront in Atlantic City, New Jersey, in August.

== Background ==
The festival is held on the sand on the Atlantic City beach next to the boardwalk and attendees are allowed to bring a low-profile beach chair. Unlike many New Jersey beaches which require a fee to enter, the beach at Atlantic City is free to swim and sunbathe and is guarded by lifeguards in the summer. During the festival, attendees are permitted to swim in the ocean inside the festival area while lifeguards are on duty during daylight hours, according to the festival's website.

== 2023 ==
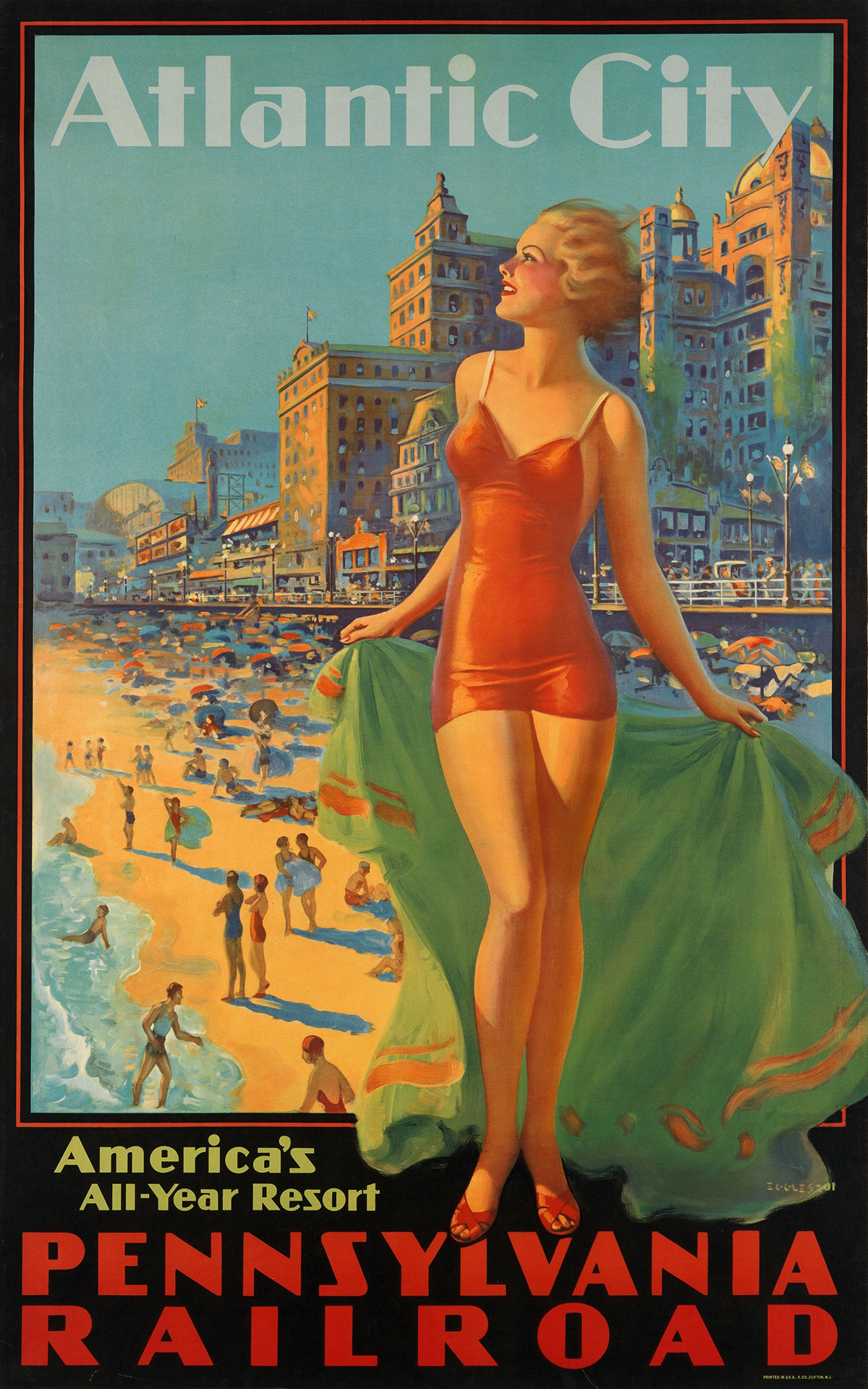
A 1930s Atlantic City promotional painting by Edward Mason Eggleston.

Performers included:

- Jason Aldean
- Brooks & Dunn

== 2022 ==
The inaugural festival featured:

- Dierks Bentley
- Morgan Wallen
- Luke Bryan

During his performance, Wallen played what Music Mayhem Magazine described as an "epic" hard rock medley of covers.

== See also ==
- Tennessee Avenue Beer Hall.
- North to Shore Festival
- Dante Hall Theater
- Noyes Arts Garage
- Barefoot Country Music Festival, on the beach in Wildwood, New Jersey, about 50 minutes south of Atlantic City.
- List of New Jersey music venues sortable by capacity
- Warner Theatre (Atlantic City)
