= Jenny Belzberg =

Canadian philanthropist (born 1928)

- Born: January 7, 1928 (age 98); Calgary, Alberta, Canada
- Occupations: Community activist and philanthropist
- Family: Samuel Belzberg (brother-in-law); Strauss Zelnick (nephew-in-law)
- Awards: Order of Canada; Alberta Order of Excellence

Jenny Belzberg CM AOE (born Jenny Lavin on January 7, 1928) is a Canadian community activist and philanthropist. A Member of the Order of Canada, she was married to Hyman Belzberg and together they were a prominent force in community and cultural affairs.

== Personal life ==
Jenny Belzberg was born in Calgary, Alberta. Her father, Abraham Lavin, was an immigrant from a small village in Russia and came to Canada in 1911 and established a farm in the Cochrane, Calgary area. His first wife died in childbirth, leaving him with a baby daughter, whom he raised with his widowed sister. Six years later he moved back into Calgary and established several different small businesses, including a flour/feed store and service station. Belzberg's mother was Sonia Rodnunsky. She immigrated from the eastern regions of Gomel, Russia during the Russian Revolution of 1917, joining relatives in Calgary in 1921. She met Lavin in the city and the two were soon married. After attending Western Canada high school, Belzberg was dissuaded from attending university, since her father believed women did not need secondary education. So, she worked as a clerk and stenographer for the military, the Cunard Shipping Line in Vancouver, and the Dominion Department of Immigration in Calgary. She had known Hyman "Hy" Belzberg's younger brothers, Samuel and William, through school, but she never really knew Hy himself even though the two families lived only two blocks apart. She and Hy were set up on a "blind date" and were married in 1948.

Hy was well known in Calgary as the proprietor of Cristy's Arcade Furniture and for his involvement in First City, a financial company started by his younger brothers that, along with their personal holdings, at one time controlled assets in excess of $5 billion, before debts ultimately swamped the corporation and led to its fall. The company was acquired by its Swiss bondholders; however, the Belzberg family salvaged a minority stake (15%) via Harrowston Inc., a holding company overseen by Brent Belzberg, the couple's oldest son. Hy probably is most famous for having been kidnapped in 1982 near his furniture store, then ultimately freed by his captors. Hy died in 2017.

== Achievements ==
- Founder and chairwoman, Calgary Arts Partnership in Education Society (CAPES)
- Founder, Lieutenant Governor of Alberta Arts Award Foundation (2003)
- Founder, Esther Honens International Piano Competition (Calgary)
- Founder, Canadian Cancer Society's Daffodil Gala
- Trustee, National Arts Centre (2000)
- Councilor, Judicial Council for Provincial Court Judges
- Vice President, Special Events, Calgary Philharmonic Society
- Advisor, Calgary City Hall restoration
- Advisor, Community and Partners Advisory Committee, Libin Cardiovascular Institute of Alberta
- Advisor, Dean's Committee, University of Calgary, Faculty of Social Work.
- Honorary Chairman of the First Leadership Calgary Program

Jenny and her husband were integral in securing the Mordechai Richler papers for the university.

Belzberg has held many important positions with the Beth Israel Sisterhood in Calgary, the National Council of Jewish Women, the Jewish National Fund, and the Calgary Jewish Community Council. Moreover, as strong supporters of Israel, the Belzbergs were honored in 1993 at the Calgary Negev Dinner

== Philanthropy ==
Jenny Belzberg Endowment, Banff Centre

== Awards ==
- Member of the Order of Canada (1996)
- Alberta Order of Excellence (2000)
- Honorary doctorate, University of Calgary (2002)
- Alberta Centennial Medal (2006)
- Diamond Jubilee of Queen Elizabeth II Medal (2012)
- Paul Harris Fellow, Rotary Club International
- Award Dinner was held in Jenny's honor in 2001 where she received an award from the Honens International Piano Competition.

== Sources ==
- "Calgary's Big Givers, Calgary Herald 2011".
- "Remarkable Albertans: What Our Readers Think, Calgary Herald, 2017".
