= TCF =

TCF can mean:

== Facilities and structures ==
- TCF Center, Detroit, Michigan, USA; a convention center
- TCF Stadium, Minneapolis, Minnesota, USA; of the University of Minnesota

== Computing ==
- Trenton Computer Festival, US
- Tor Carding Forum, stolen credit card marketplace
- Technical control facility in telecommunications
- Transparency and Consent Framework in online advertising

== Education ==
- Test de connaissance du français, a test of knowledge of French
- The Citizens Foundation, low-cost schools in Pakistan

== Entertainment ==
- TCF, short for Twentieth Century Fox

== Finance ==
- TCF Financial Corporation, a holding company
  - TCF Bank

== Science ==
- TCF-1 or HNF1A, a gene
- TCF4 or TCF7L2, a protein transcription factor
- TCF/LEF family of transcription factors, TCF7, etc.

== Technology ==
- New Zealand Telecommunications Forum
- Transparent conducting film, used in touch screens and solar cells
- Trillion (10^{12}) cubic feet
- Totally Chlorine Free in bleaching of wood pulp

== Other uses ==
- Shuttle America (feeder airline ICAO code)
- The Compassionate Friends, UK, for bereaved parents
- Third Coast International Audio Festival
