= New Jersey Theatre Alliance =

American non-profit service organization

- Founded: 1981
- Type: 501(c)(3)
- Region served: New Jersey; New Hope, PA
- Key people: John McEwen, Executive Director Erica Nagel, Deputy Director
- Website: njtheatrealliance.org

The New Jersey Theatre Alliance is a nonprofit nongovernmental service organization that promotes and supports professional theaters throughout New Jersey. It is one of the nation's first and largest such entities. Its mission is to "unite, promote, strengthen, and cultivate" the state's professional theater community.

== Background ==
Founded in 1981, the organization has a six-member team and serves 42 professional theaters in the state as well as in New Hope, Pennsylvania.

The Alliance provides various resources, networking opportunities, and advocacy efforts to build the growth and visibility of theater in New Jersey. It collaborates with theaters, artists, educators, and the public to foster a professional theater culture in the state.

== See also ==
- The Hook, live cabaret-style comedic show and contemporary circus in Atlantic City, New Jersey that opened in 2023
- Mason Gross School of the Arts at Rutgers University
- New Jersey Motion Picture & Television Commission
