= Summer Jam (festival) =

Annual American hip-hop festival

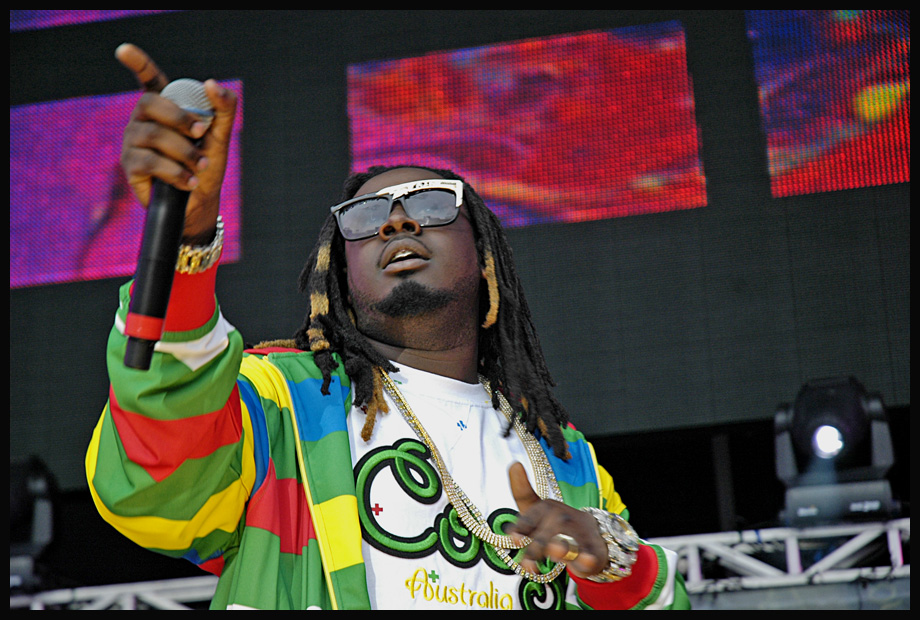
- T-Pain performing at Hot 97's Summer Jam 2007 at Giants Stadium
- Genre: Hip hop
- Locations: East Rutherford, New Jersey, Elmont, New York, Uniondale, New York
- Years active: 1994–present
- Website: www.hot97.com/summerjam/

Summer Jam is the annual hip-hop fest held in the tri-state area and sponsored by New York-based radio station Hot 97FM. Normally held in June, the concert features popular New York and national acts in hip hop and R&B. Summer Jam 2024 was held June 2, 2024 at the UBS Arena in Elmont, New York.

== History ==
The hip-hop summer festival format was originally pioneered and popularized by San Francisco radio station KMEL with their large-scale Summer Jam concerts from 1987 through the 1990s and present day. KMEL continues to host smaller versions of the event annually. Similarly, Los Angeles station KKBT held an annual Summer Jam hip-hop concert during the 1990s after hiring KMEL's Program Director in 1993. The concert was discontinued as the station switched formats.

By 1994, there was thought to be a lack of large, exclusively hip-hop festivals in the tri-state area. As hip-hop began to rise in commercial success, WQHT, Hot 97, the primary Hip-hop and R&B FM radio station in the area, began to plan an exclusively hip-hop festival. Given the scale of such an undertaking, Carl Freed, who at the time worked with Metropolitan Entertainment, was asked to executively produce the festival. The first Hot 97 Summer Jam took place at the then Brendon Byrne Arena (later Meadowlands Arena, Continental Airlines Arena and Izod Center) in East Rutherford, New Jersey on June 21, 1994. The original lineup included Black Moon, Gang Starr, Nas, Queen Latifah, A Tribe Called Quest, Arrested Development, SWV, and the Wu-Tang Clan.

By 2001, the festival venue moved to Nassau Coliseum, in Uniondale, New York, due to safety concerns of venue managers at the previous venue. The 2001 festival included many more national acts from outside of New York, with a line-up including Destiny's Child, Eve, Ja Rule, Jadakiss, R. Kelly, Ludacris, Outkast, Nelly, and Jay-Z. Famously, that year, Jay-Z debuted his infamous "Takeover" diss track directed at Nas and Mobb Deep, and brought out Michael Jackson, Missy Elliott, and EPMD on stage, establishing the tradition of surprise guests at the festival.

In 2003, the festival moved to Giants Stadium, due to the need for increased capacity. After the demolition of Giants Stadium, the festival moved to the New Meadowlands Stadium (later Metlife Stadium), in 2010. In 2023, the festival returned to New York state after 21 years, taking place at UBS arena.

Since 2012, in addition to the main stage, Summer Jam has also featured a "festival stage" earlier in the day, showcasing up-and-coming, as well as local artists.

In 2025, Summer Jam was scheduled to take place as a part of the North to Shore Festival held annually each June in New Jersey.

== Incidents ==
In 2012, Nicki Minaj skipped her scheduled performance at the festival, after remarks from Hot 97 on-air personality Peter Rosenberg, on stage, earlier during the festival. Nicki Minaj returned to the Summer Jam stage the following year, as a surprise performer.

A festival held on June 7, 2015 included a disturbance in the stadium parking lot. The disturbance began when crowds of people without tickets attempted to enter the stadium by climbing over the fence and were stopped by New Jersey State Police. At this time, the decision to close all gates to the stadium was made and those in the parking lot were asked to leave. The crowd began throwing glass bottles and other objects. The police responded with riot gear, armored vehicles, and pepper spray. Multiple arrests were made.

The festival often coincides with the occurrence of severe inclement weather, as it did during the festivals of 2006, 2014, 2016, and 2021.

== See also ==
- List of hip hop music festivals
- Hip hop culture
