= Asbury Lanes =

American bowling alley, performance venue (1962–)

Coordinates: 40.2231°N 74.0019°W

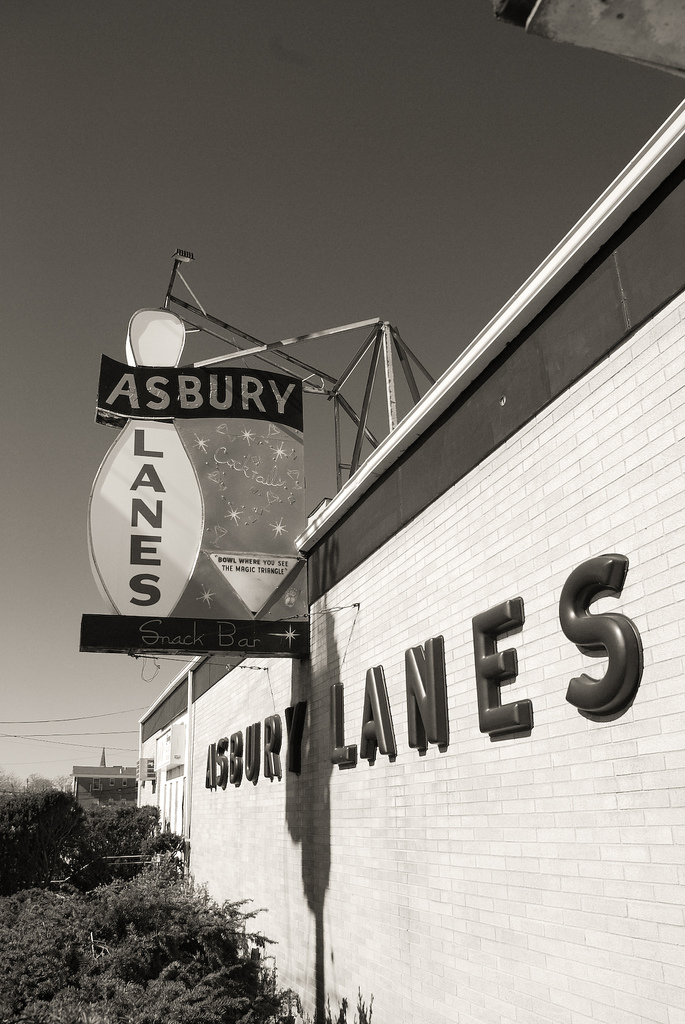
- Front entrance of Asbury Lanes
- Interactive map of Asbury Lanes
- Location: Asbury Park, New Jersey
- Type: Music venue, Bowling alley
- Events: Pop; Country; Previously: Punk; Garage; Hard rock Folk; Surf; Psychobilly
- Public transit: NJ Transit at Asbury Park station North Jersey Coast Line NJT Bus: 830, 832, 836

Construction
- Opened: 1962

Website
- www.asburylanes.com

Asbury Lanes located in Asbury Park, New Jersey is a vintage bowling alley and bar with live performances ranging from live musical acts, burlesque, hot rod, dance parties, film and art shows. It is one of the many historic live music and arts venues located within Asbury Park.

== Music venue ==
Since its re-opening in 2003, Asbury Lanes has hosted many notable bands, mostly of the punk rock variety. The bowling lanes double as center stage when bands are playing and as a dance floor.

On October 3, 2015, the venue announced that it was closing for renovations. It was later confirmed that real estate investment company, iStar, purchased the venue as part of a multibillion dollar redevelopment plan for Asbury Park. Having previously purchased 58 bowling alleys for $104 million in 2014, iStar is restoring the building with an intent to keep it operating as a bowling alley with ticketed events once it reopens in 2017.

== Notable acts ==
Mainly consisting of punk rock bands, Asbury Lanes has also hosted other genres of music as well as non-musical acts.

Some notable acts to have played Asbury Lanes include:

- The Beths
- Big D and the Kids Table
- Butthole Surfers
- The Bouncing Souls
- D.O.A.
- Dick Dale
- The Ergs!
- The Germs
- John Doe
- Jucifer
- The Julie Ruin
- King Khan and the Shrines
- Los Straitjackets
- Me First and the Gimme Gimmes
- The Menzingers
- Mick Jones
- Mike Gordon
- Mod Fun
- Murphy's Law
- Negative Approach
- Neil Hamburger
- of Montreal
- OFF!
- Reverend Horton Heat
- Screaming Females
- Shonen Knife
- Spring Heeled Jack
- Street Dogs
- The Supersuckers
- Swingin' Utters
- The Toasters
- Wanda Jackson
- Yesterdays Rising

== Film festival ==
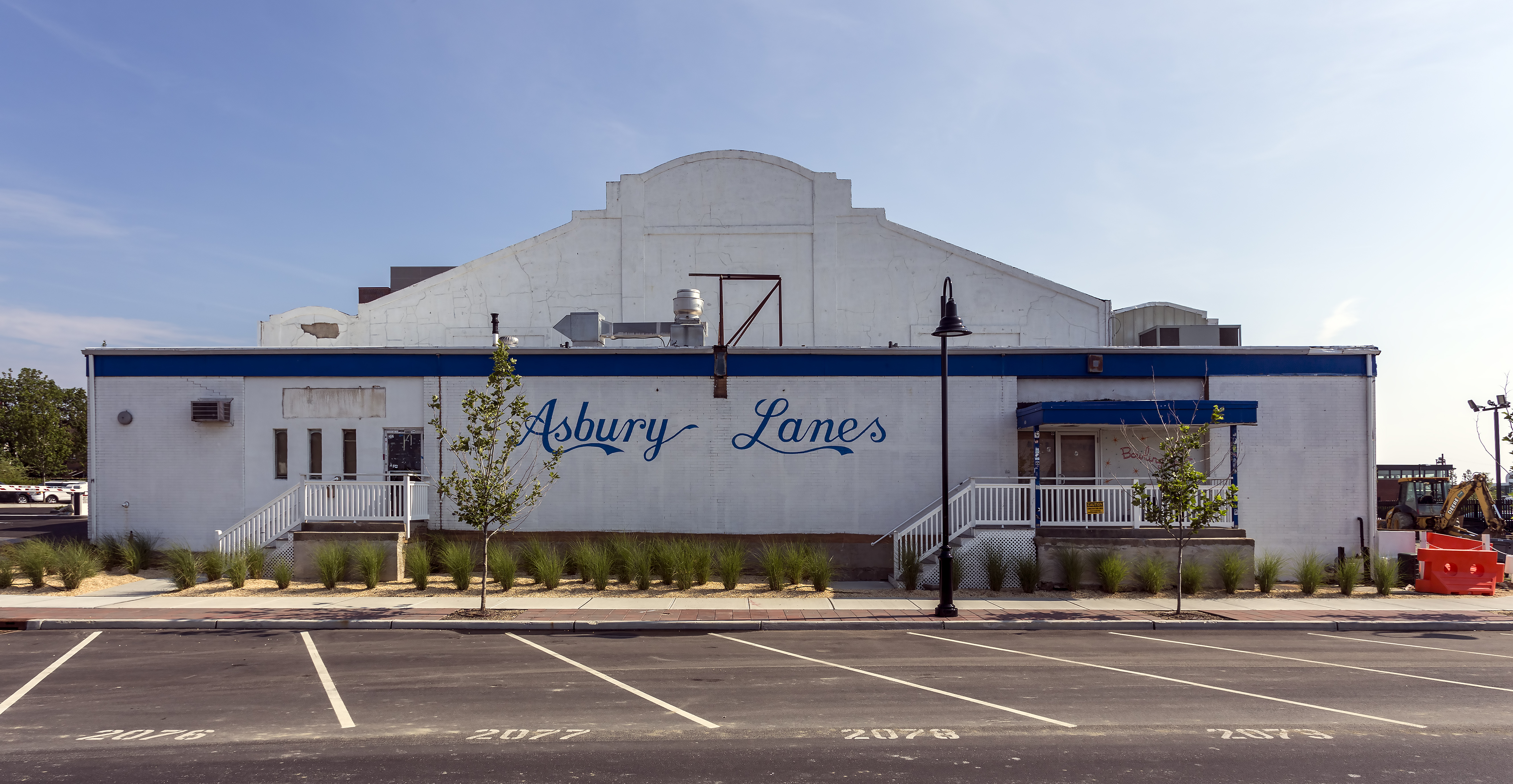
Asbury Lanes in 2016

Asbury Lanes has also played host to the Tromapalooza in August 2009. Tromapalooza was a fan gathering and small scale film festival featuring films new and old from Troma Entertainment film studios, such as the Toxic Avenger and Sgt. Kabukiman, NYPD. Troma co-founder Lloyd Kaufman, who had staged the TromaDance film festival in the same Utah location as, and coincident with, the Sundance Film Festival each January from 1999 to 2009, was on hand for this single Tromapalozza. The event helped transition TromaDance to the east coast, with the 2010, 2011 and 2013 TromaDance festivals held at Asbury Lanes.

== See also ==
- Asbury Park
- Asbury Park Music Awards
- The Saint
- The Stone Pony
- North to Shore
- Court Tavern
- New Jersey music venues by capacity
