= Lucas Zelnick =

American stand-up comedian

- Born: New York City, U.S.
- Education: Williams College; Stanford University (MBA)
- Occupation: Comedian
- Father: Strauss Zelnick
- Relatives: Samuel Belzberg (grandfather)

Lucas Zelnick is an American stand-up comedian.

== Early life and education ==
Zelnick was born and raised in New York City on the Upper East Side. His father, Strauss Zelnick, is a businessman and lawyer. His mother, Wendy, is the daughter of Samuel Belzberg. He has a brother and a sister. His sister has a mental disability.

In eighth grade, Zelnick participated in a comedy sketch group as part of the talent show. In a childhood yearbook, Zelnick was named as "most likely to be on tour as a comedian in 15 years." Zelnick attended Williams College in Massachusetts, majoring in English and economics, and graduating in 2017. During his time there, he auditioned for the improv comedy group but was rejected. Following his graduation, Zelnick worked in corporate strategy at Viacom. Zelnick later attended Stanford University, receiving a Master of Business Administration in 2022.

== Career ==
While working at Viacom, Zelnick once again tried improv, but determined he was not very good at it, and decided to try stand-up instead. In 2019, Zelnick first participated in stand-up through a class he took in the Chelsea neighborhood of New York City. Zelnick's first performance was at a charity event for doctors, and his jokes were not received well, with Zelnick ultimately cutting the ten minute set short after four minutes. Martha Stewart attended the event, and told him after the event ended, "How you joked about your girlfriend made me want to punch you in the face."

In 2021, while working on his M.B.A degree, Zelnick returned to New York for the summer and co-founded Sesh Comedy Club. Zelnick and a friend, Jamie Wolf, had rented a space on the Lower East Side to work and write scripts. They realized they could make money to pay for the rent by producing comedy shows. The club was successful, and Zelnick began performing there fourteen times a week. They sold the club at the end of the summer, and Zelnick returned to Stanford to finish up his business degree. He performed in San Francisco regularly during the second year of his M.B.A. program. Zelnick and Wolf later hosted a satirical podcast together called Can I Go Home Now? which ended in 2025.

Zelnick first gained recognition as a stand-up comedian through clips of his crowd work that were posted to TikTok in 2021. By 2022, Zelnick had more than twenty-two thousand followers on social media. Ashley Gavin has served as a mentor for Zelnick, and he opened for her tour.

In April 2026, Zelnick launched a podcast called Mommy Issues with Lucas Zelnick, hosted by Zelnick and his mother. On the podcast, they answer questions from followers and provide advice. As of April 2026, Zelnick had more than one million followers on social media. In May 2026, Zelnick was featured as a rising comedian in a showcase at Netflix is a Joke Fest. In November 2026, he was considered one of Variety's ten comics to look out for in 2026.

== Filmography ==
Year	Title	Role	Notes
2023	You're Up	Himself	1 episode
2024	Brooklyn Coffee Shop	Corporate bro	2 episodes
2026	Comics Unleashed	Himself	1 episode

== Personal life ==
Zelnick is Jewish, and has described himself as pro-Palestine.
