= Charlene Amini =

American-Bolivian artist, writer, and cultural advocate

- Born: Charlene Eckels; North Carolina, U.S.
- Education: University of North Carolina Wilmington
- Occupations: Artist, writer, cultural advocate
- Known for: Founding the American Bolivian Collective
- Spouse: Martin Amini

Charlene Amini (formerly known as Charlene Eckels) is an American-Bolivian artist, writer, and cultural advocate. She is the founder of the American Bolivian Collective, a platform dedicated to celebrating Bolivian identity through art, storytelling, and community engagement. Amini's work explores diaspora, Amazonian heritage, and the role of women in cultural memory.

== Career ==
In 2019, Amini founded the American Bolivian Collective (ABC), to amplify underrepresented Bolivian diasporic voices. In 2022, she launched the American Bolivian Collective Scholarship in Memory of Janett Adams, honoring her mother's legacy as a media pioneer and cultural advocate. In 2025, she published a Bolivian-themed coloring book, highlighting Indigenous and folkloric elements of Bolivian culture.

Amini collaborated on a Nike shoe inspired by the Bolivian Amazon.

Her work has been featured in several media outlets, including Remezcla, Bolivian Express, the U.S. Embassy, and the Bolivian news outlet Brújula Digital.

== Personal life ==
Charlene Amini is married to comedian Martin Amini, founder of Room 808. Her mother was from the Bolivian Amazon, a heritage that informs much of Amini's art and advocacy work.

== See also ==
- Bolivian Americans
- List of Bolivian Americans
- Latin American diaspora
