= Dante Hall Theater =

Coordinates: 39.35827°N 74.43998°W

Dante Hall
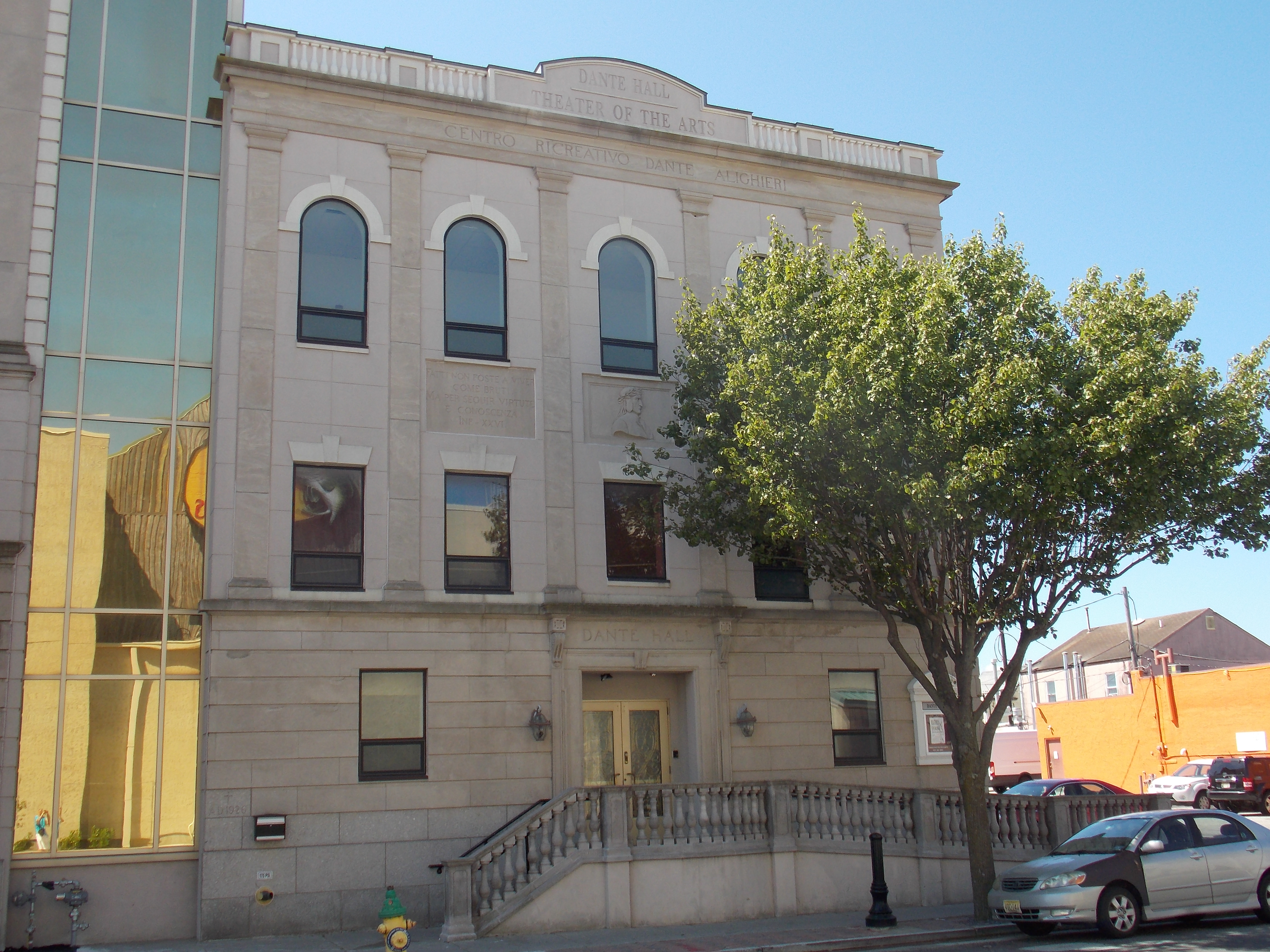
- Interactive map of Dante Hall
- Address: 14 North Mississippi Avenue; Atlantic City, New Jersey; U.S.
- Owner: Roman Catholic Diocese of Camden
- Operator: Stockton University
- Capacity: 240
- Type: Broadway

Construction
- Opened: 1928
- Rebuilt: 2003

Website
- http://intraweb.stockton.edu/eyos/page.cfm?siteID=256&pageID=1

Dante Hall Theater of the Arts is a theatre and cultural center in Atlantic City, New Jersey located in the Ducktown neighbourhood, which has traditionally been the city's Little Italy. It is now part of Stockton University.

Dante Hall Theater was originally built in 1926 by St. Michael's Catholic Church, and primarily served the predominantly Italian-American community as a church hall, school gymnasium, and community theatre. St. Michael’s closed its parish school in the late 1980s, leaving the building dormant. An eighteen-month, $3.5 million renovation, funded solely by the Casino Reinvestment Development Authority, was completed in October 2003 and renamed Dante Hall Theater of the Arts. In 2011, Stockton University took control of the theatre, which remains the property of the Roman Catholic Diocese of Camden.

== See also ==
- Carnegie Library Center, former public library that for a time was also part of Stockton College
- The Orange Loop
- The Warner Theatre
