= Martin Amini =

American stand-up comedian

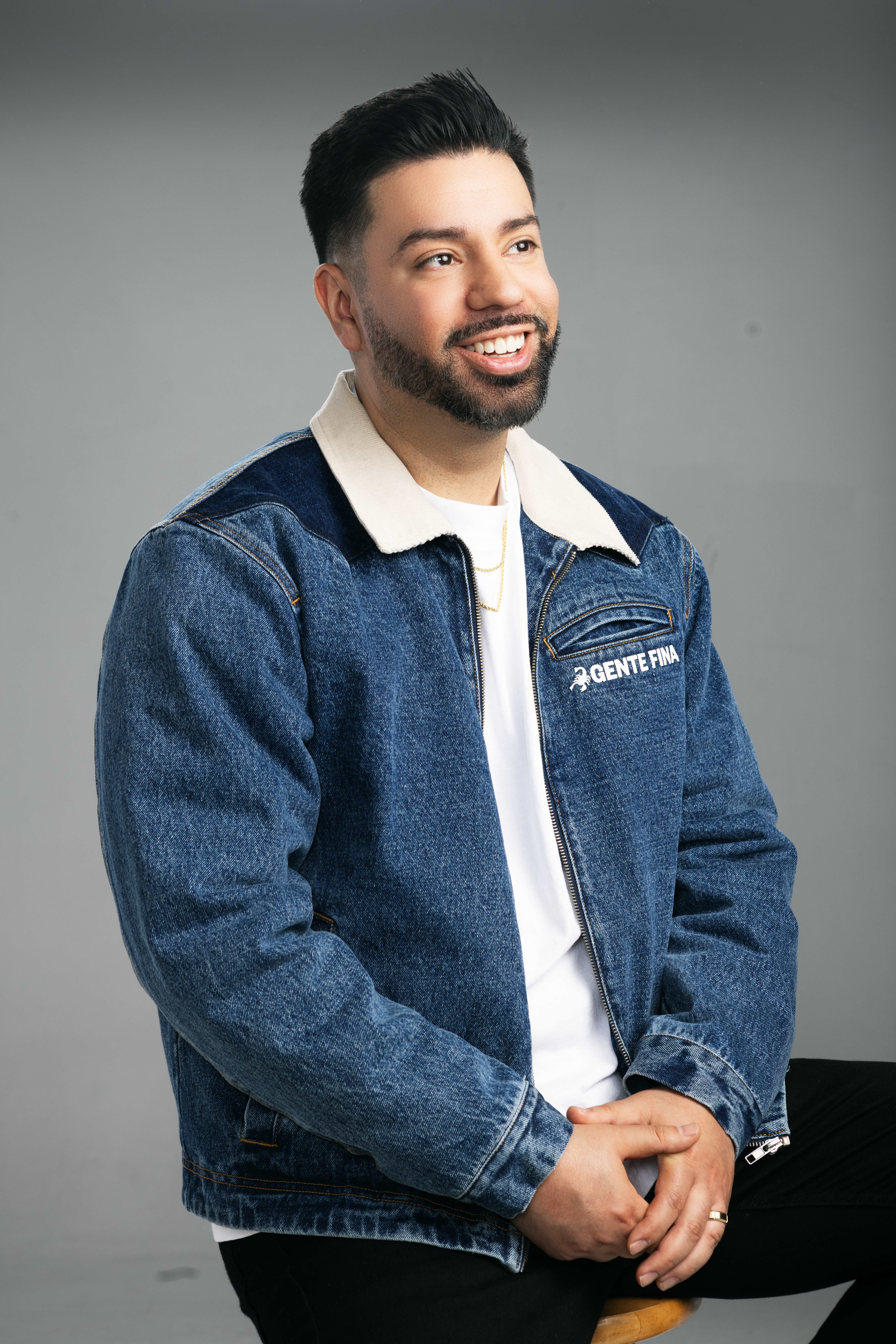
- Amini in June 2025
- Born: Silver Spring, Maryland, U.S.
- Education: Robert H. Smith School of Business University of Maryland, College Park
- Spouse: Charlene Amini

Comedy career
- Years active: 2012–present
- Medium: Stand-up; television; film
- Genres: stand-up comedy; crowd work; matchmaking
- Subjects: Multicultural; Second generation; immigrant parents; everyday life; relationships; family; matchmaking
- Website: martinamini.com

Martin Amini is an American stand-up comedian whose material has centered around his experiences growing up in America with immigrant parents from mixed cultural backgrounds. Amini is the founder of Room 808, which was named one of the best comedy clubs in the city by The Washington Post in 2024. Amini's comedy includes crowd work, and he is considered to be the cupid of stand-up comedy a title he attributes to the inspiration he draws from his own marriage.

== Early life and education ==
Amini was born and raised in Silver Spring, Maryland, the first-generation child of Bolivian and Iranian immigrant parents.

== Career ==
=== Room 808 ===
In 2021, Martin Amini founded Room 808, an independent comedy club located at 808 Upshur Street NW in the Petworth neighborhood of Washington, D.C. The venue offers an intimate setting for stand-up performances and has been recognized as one of the best comedy clubs in D.C. by The Washington Post.

Room 808 hosts shows five nights a week, featuring a mix of local talent and nationally recognized comedians, including performers from Netflix, Comedy Central, and HBO.

In a May 2025 interview on Good Morning Washington, Amini discussed Room 808's role in the comedy scene, highlighting its function as a space where comedians can develop and refine their material. He mentioned that notable comedians, such as Matt Rife, have utilized the venue to test new content before embarking on larger tours. Amini emphasized the club's supportive environment, stating that it serves as a creative incubator for both emerging and established comedians.

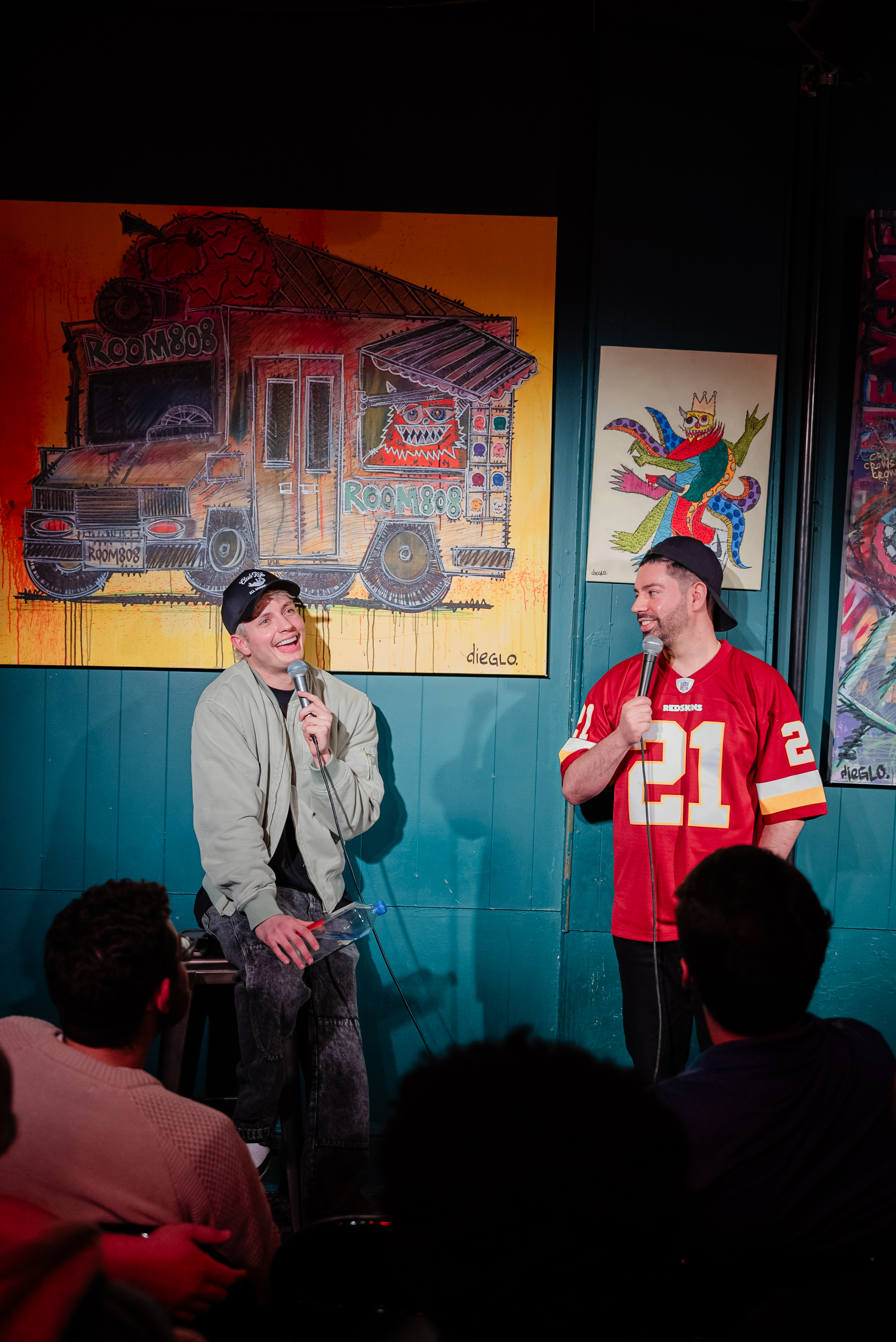
Amini and Matt Rife at Room 808

Room 808 has also been a platform for collaborative performances. Over the years, Amini and Rife co-headlined shows at the venue, showcasing their comedic synergy. Additionally, Rife made surprise appearances at Room 808 to work on new material ahead of his arena tour, underscoring the club's reputation as a testing ground for high-profile comedians.

Amini has built a career in stand-up comedy that spans over a decade, marked by sold-out tours, international performances, and collaborations with some of the biggest names in comedy. Martin Amini made his television debut on TruTV's Laff Tracks. He credits his cousin, comedian Max Amini, for inspiring him to pursue stand-up after inviting him to work as a camera operator on tour.

In 2020, he filmed a stand-up performance entitled Son of An Ice Cream Man at The Kennedy Center in Washington, D.C.

In 2023, Amini released his debut comedy special I’m Transcending, which at the historic Lincoln Theatre in Washington, D.C.. The special was directed by comedian Erik Griffin, with Amini, Matt Rife, and Christina Shams serving as executive producers.

Amini is recognized for his sharp crowd work and has earned a reputation as the "cupid of stand-up comedy" for his onstage matchmaking interactions. He has headlined premier comedy venues in Los Angeles, including sold-out shows at The Comedy Store’s Main Room, the Hollywood Improv, and The Regent Theater as part of Netflix is a Joke Festival 2024.

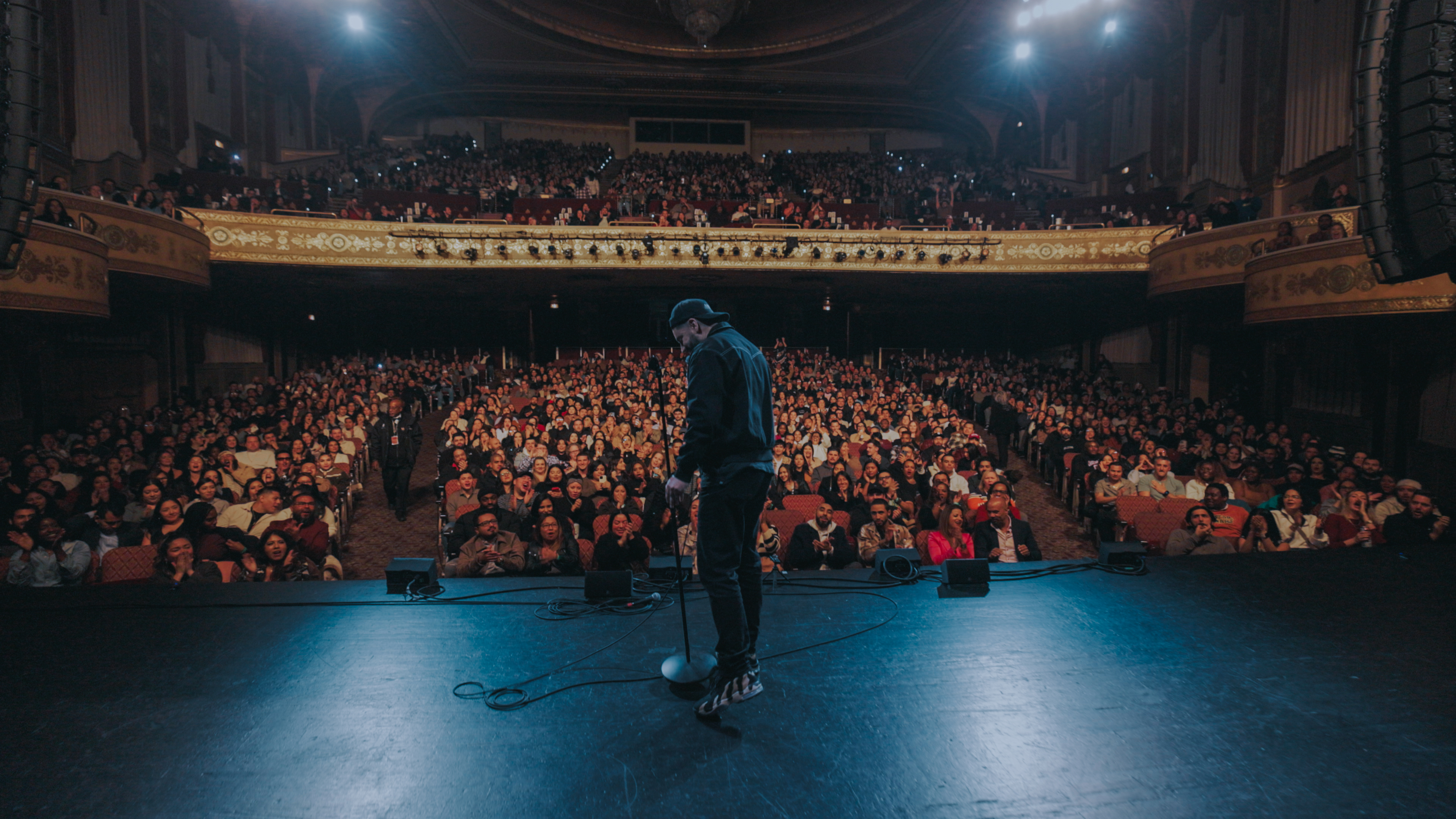
Amini performing at the Warner Theatre in Washington, D.C. during his 2025 tour

Amini tours internationally with Live Nation, performing for multiple years in cities including London, Sydney, Melbourne, Toronto, Vancouver, and Montreal.

He is currently on a multi-city U.S. theater tour with numerous sold-out performances. Highlights include New York City's Town Hall, San Francisco’s Palace of Fine Arts Theatre, San Antonio’s Aztec Theatre, Chicago’s Vic Theatre, Atlanta’s Center Stage Theater, and New Jersey Performing Arts Center (NJPAC). In Washington, D.C., his hometown, he regularly sells out the DC Improv, Lincoln Theatre, and Warner Theatre.

Amini has opened for or performed alongside prominent comedians, including Trevor Wallace, Andrew Schulz, Trevor Noah, Jerrod Carmichael, Hasan Minhaj, Theo Von, Tim Dillon, Stavros Halkias, Max Amini, Marcella Arguello, Aida Rodriguez, Felipe Esparza, Nimesh Patel, Michael Che, Gad Elmaleh, and Bill Burr.

Amini also opened for Matt Rife at Constitution Hall during the taping of Natural Selection, and at Red Rocks Amphitheatre and the Hollywood Bowl during the Netflix is a Joke festival.

Amini is represented by WME (William Morris Endeavor).

== Personal life ==
Amini is married to Charlene Amini, founder of the American Bolivian Collective. She has been cited as source of inspiration for Amini, particularly in his reflections on love and relationships in his stand up comedy.
