= Caesars Atlantic City =

Casino Hotel in New Jersey, United States

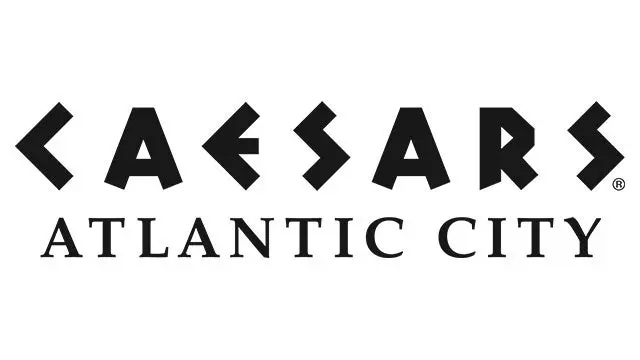

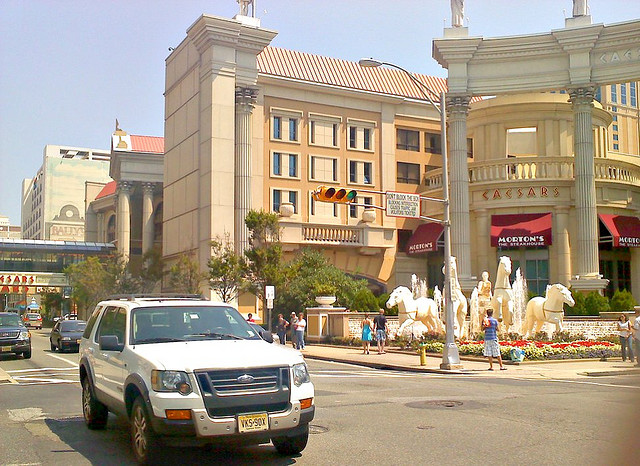
- The Centurion tower, the main hotel tower of Caesars Atlantic City.
- Interactive map of Caesars Atlantic City
- Location: Atlantic City, New Jersey, U.S.; 2100 Pacific Avenue; 39°21′21″N 74°26′10″W
- Opened: June 26, 1979; 47 years ago
- Theme: Roman Empire; Greece; Western (Wild Wild West)
- No. of rooms: 1,141
- Gaming space: 145,000 ft^{2} (1.35 ha)
- Permanent shows: Various
- Signature attractions: The Hook; Qua Baths & Spa
- Notable restaurants: Superfrico, Nobu, Gordon Ramsey Hell's Kitchen, Morton's The Steakhouse, Atlantic Grill
- Casino type: Land-based
- Owner: Vici Properties
- Operating license holder: Caesars Entertainment
- Previous names: Caesars Boardwalk Regency
- Renovated in: 1997 (Centurion Tower); 2006-2008; 2021-2023
- Website: caesars.com/caesars-ac

Caesars Atlantic City is a luxury hotel, casino, and spa resort in Atlantic City, New Jersey. Like Caesars Palace in Las Vegas, it has an ancient Roman and ancient Greek theme. Atlantic City's second casino, it opened on June 26, 1979 as the Boardwalk Regency. The 124,720 sq ft (11,587 m^{2}) casino has over 3,400 slot machines, and is one of the largest in Atlantic City.

== History ==
The Howard Johnson's Regency Motor Hotel first opened in 1966. In 1977, Caesars purchased the hotel and announced it would renovate the 11-story, 425-room structure and add seven floors to the building, expanding the room count to 548, plus a 52,000 sq.ft. casino at an estimated cost of $300 million. Despite the governor of New Jersey's demands, the Casino Control Commission allowed Caesars to use the Howard Johnson building due to it being relatively new construction. The casino opened on June 26, 1979, being the second casino to open after Resorts International in 1978. The casino first opened as the Boardwalk Regency, omitting the Caesars name, as the Casino Control Commission continued to investigate the corporation. In 1983 Caesars was added to the name and it became Caesars Boardwalk Regency.

A 1985 expansion of the property included the erection of the Circus Maximus Showroom, replacing the smaller Cabaret Theater.

In 1987, the name of the resort was changed to Caesars Atlantic City. Throughout the late 1990s and 2000s, Caesars expanded the Roman theme to the exterior, which originally had an art deco look. Renovations were completed in 2008, with the Boardwalk and street sides of the casino being renovated into Roman facades, along with a new parking garage and a new hotel tower.

The 25-floor Centurion Tower, added in 1997, has 610 rooms and a height of 299 ft (91 m).

In October 2017, ownership of Caesars was transferred to Vici Properties as part of a corporate spin-off, and the property was leased back to Caesars Entertainment.

On November 18, 2020, Caesars Atlantic City owner Vici Properties, which also owned the adjoining sister property Bally's Atlantic City, sold the Bally's property, but retained Bally's Wild Wild West Casino to operate as part of the Caesars property. In addition to some table games and slot machines, the Wild Wild West Casino has a sports betting area which includes a bar, a jumbo-sized wrap-around video wall, and private party rooms. At the Boardwalk entrance, there is an entertainment area consisting of a performance stage before an open area that can be used as a dance floor or as dining space for the adjoining food and beverage outlets. They include the Boardwalk Saloon, which is a bar with convertible indoor/outdoor seating, and a fast food outlet, Guy's Bar-B-Que Joint. At the Pacific Avenue end of the casino, there is a World Series of Poker branded poker room which Bally's closed due to the COVID-19 pandemic.

In 2020, Caesars Entertainment announced renovations and repairs for all 3 owned casinos in Atlantic City including Tropicana Atlantic City, Caesars, and Harrah's Atlantic City.

== Gaming ==
Caesars has 145,000 sq ft (13,500 m^{2}). of gaming space, more than 3,000 slot machines, and 135 table games. The casino is separated into several areas, which are:

Palace East – Asian gaming area.

Slots—Second Floor Casino – The main casino floor that was recently redesigned.

Poker Room – Caesar closed down its poker room.

Table Games – Caesars features over 120 table games.

== Dining ==
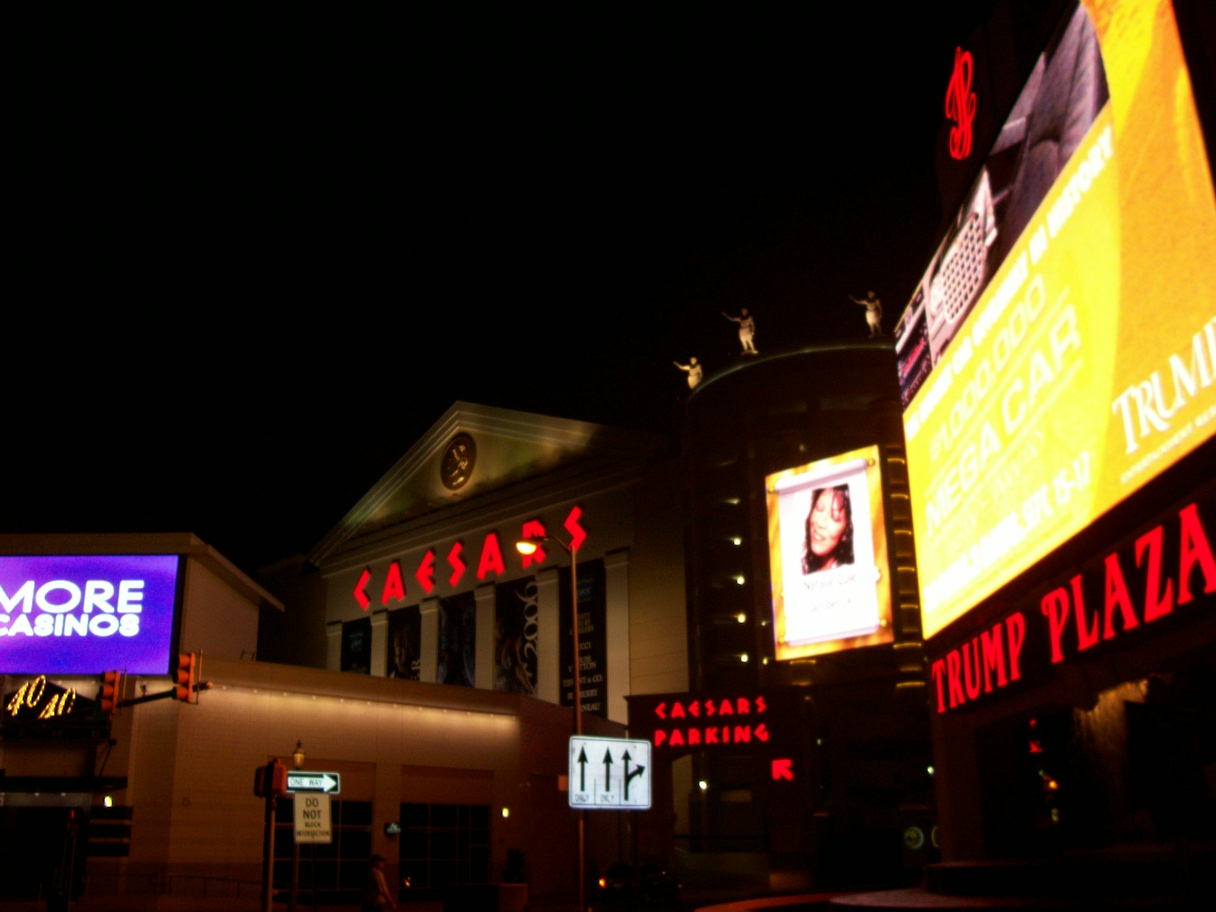
Caesars & the former Trump Plaza

There are several restaurants located around the Caesars property:

- KWI Restaurant and Noodle Bar
- Morton's The Steakhouse
- Cafe Tazza
- Gordon Ramsay Pub & Grill (Opened February 2015)
- Gordon Ramsay Hell's Kitchen
- Nobu
- Slice Pizzeria

== Live entertainment ==
=== The Hook at the Warner Theatre ===
"The Hook" opened in 2023 at Caesars Atlantic City, in the recently restored Warner Theatre. It features a live show, an East Coast production of "Italian-American Psychedelic", Superfrico restaurant, and cocktail bars.

=== Circus Maximus Theater ===
Concerts and shows can be seen at the Circus Maximus Theater, renovated in 2007.

A 1985 expansion of the property included the erection of the 1600-seat Circus Maximus Showroom, replacing the 440-seat Cabaret Theater. Both venues have hosted names such as Carrie Underwood, Diana Ross, Liza Minnelli, Mary J. Blige, Buddy Hackett, Ann-Margret, Paul Anka, Lionel Richie, Tina Turner, Donny and Marie Osmond, and Celine Dion. The Showroom has also held many professional boxing events.

=== Other entertainment ===
Dusk was on the second floor and was opened in 2009 and closed in 2021. The 8,500 square foot nightclub was owned and operated by The Dusk Management Group, and was built with the design concept of concentric circles, on three levels. Philadelphia native Adam Goldstein (aka DJ AM) was a part owner who also performed at the club. The venue was the last location that Goldstein performed before his death in 2009.

== Amenities ==
Qua Baths & Spa is located in the Ocean Tower. The Bellezza Salon is located in the Centurion Tower. There is an outdoor pool at Caesars. Guests are welcome to go to Bally's indoor pool which is adjacent to the property. Guests are charged a fee to use the pool at Bally's of $30 per person. The Beach at Caesars is located on the right side of the Pier Shops at Caesars, just in front of the casino. Toga Bar.

== Shopping ==
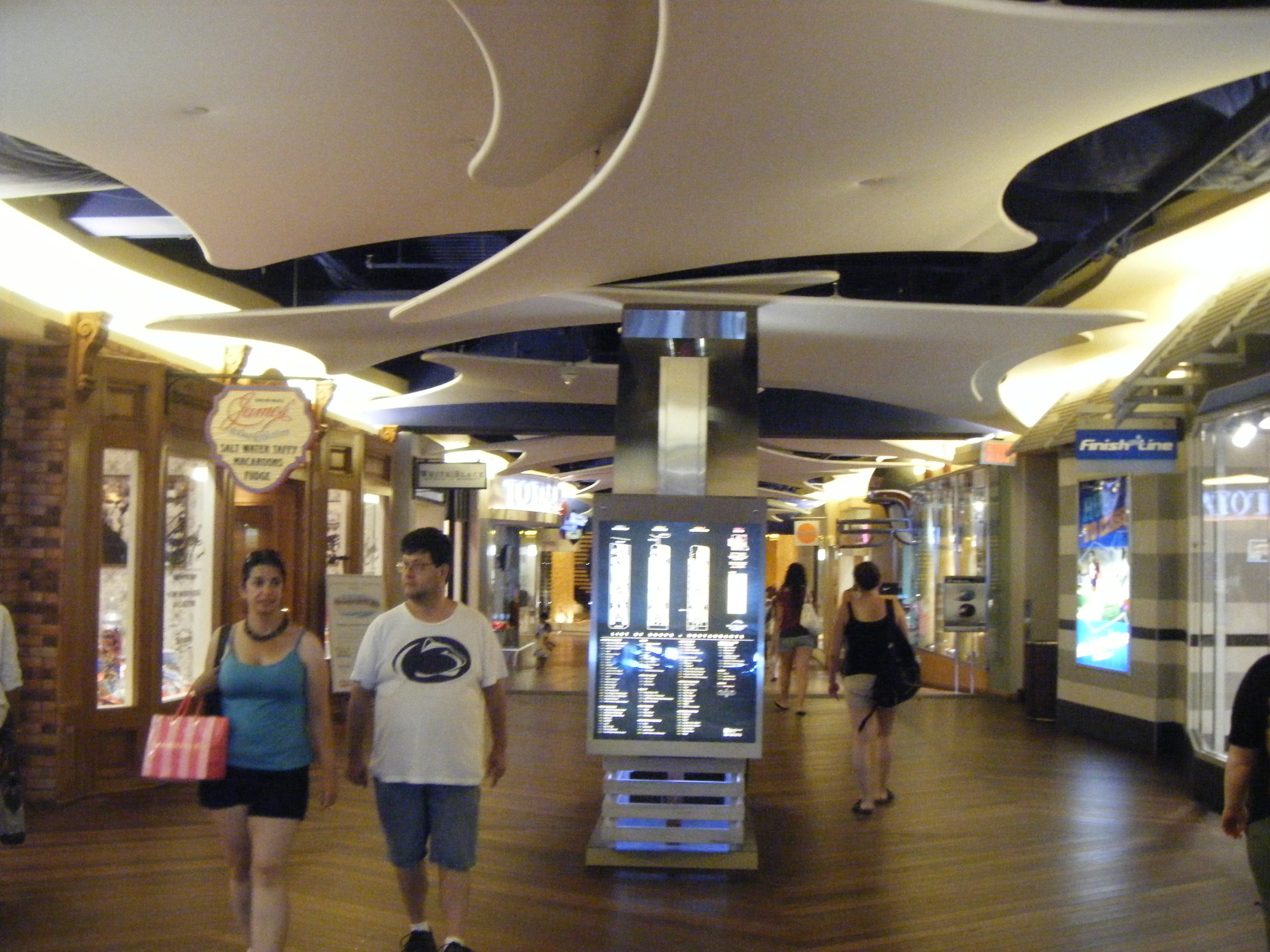
The Playground Pier

Playground Pier was a shopping mall located on the four-story Pier at Caesars adjacent to Caesars and connected via a second-story skybridge.

Other stores located within Caesars include “Caesars Exclusively” and “Emperor's Essentials”.

== Events ==
=== Sports ===
Boxing and mixed martial arts matches are held at the casino.

== See also ==
- Caesars Palace
- Caesars Windsor
- Caesars Entertainment
- Gambling in New Jersey
- List of tallest buildings in Atlantic City
- List of Caesars Entertainment properties
- List of integrated resorts
