= Jersey Shore Music Festival =

The Jersey Shore Music Festival is an annual music festival. The festival premiered in 2008 and was known as The Seaside Music Festival until 2012. The event takes place in Seaside Heights, New Jersey. The first festival featured more than 240 bands in a variety of musical genres, including rock, singer-songwriter, alternative, pop rock, and others. Each year, its performances take place at outdoor venues and inside bars on the Seaside Heights boardwalk.

In addition to music, the festival includes other events such as monster truck rides on the beach, Freestyle Motocross, BMX, skateboard stunt shows, a vendor village, and paintball target practice.

With the festival on hiatus in 2020, they plan to return in 2021.
