= Samuel Belzberg =

Canadian businessman (1928–2018)

- Born: June 26, 1928; Calgary, Alberta, Canada
- Died: March 30, 2018 (aged 89); Vancouver, British Columbia, Canada
- Occupations: Businessman, philanthropist
- Spouse: Frances Belzberg
- Children: 4
- Family: Jenny Belzberg (sister-in-law); Strauss Zelnick (son-in-law)
- Awards: Order of Canada; Order of British Columbia

Samuel Belzberg, OC OBC (June 26, 1928 – March 30, 2018) was a Canadian businessman and philanthropist.

== Biography ==
Samuel Belzberg was born to a Jewish family in Calgary, Alberta, and educated at the University of Alberta. In 1962, he founded the provincial trust company, City Savings and Trust in Edmonton which was heavily involved in real-estate development financing. In 1968, he moved to Vancouver, and along with his brothers, Hyman Belzberg (1925-2017) and William Belzberg (1932-2014), formed Western Realty. In 1970, he founded First City Financial Corp as the parent company for City Savings and Trust. In 1973, Belzberg and his brothers sold Western Realty and purchased Far West Financial Corp of California, marking their entrance into the United States. By the late 1980s, First City Financial Corp, now a diversified holding company, had assets of $5.4 billion with operations in Canada and the US. First City was involved in many large investment transactions including Bache Securities before it was sold to Prudential, Gulf Oil, Armstrong World (a large building supply company) and Scovill (a manufacturing company which included Yale Locks, Hamilton Beach, NuTone) which they purchased in 1985 for $523 million.

During the 1990s, Belzberg founded Balfour Holdings Ltd., a real estate company which, at its peak, operated over 26 projects spreading through the United States. Balfour's mandate was to profit from the dislocations in value in the United States due to the Savings and Loan crisis. Balfour subdivided and serviced its purchased lands and sold the lots to National Builders. In 1997, Balfour was sold to the Blackstone Group, a large U.S. private equity group and generated realized returns in excess of 20% per annum. During the 1990s, Mr. Belzberg was an active acquirer of distressed property in Alberta where values had dramatically declined due to the softness in the oil industry. These properties were subsequently divested when the market recovered. In 1992, Belzberg started a private real estate and equity investments company, which is now called Gibralt Capital Corporation.

== Philanthropy and awards ==
Belzberg served on various Board of Directors and is involved with numerous charities. He was awarded the Order of Canada in 1989 from the Governor General, and also in 1989 he received an honorary doctorate from Simon Fraser University.

The "Samuel and Frances Belzberg Library" at Simon Fraser University is named after the couple.

== Personal life ==
Belzberg died on March 30, 2018, in Vancouver, survived by his wife of 68 years, Frances (née Cooper), and four children: Marc, Lisa, Wendy, and Cheri. Wendy married and has 3 children with American businessman Strauss Zelnick. Previously, Wendy also dated the late, disgraced financier Jeffrey Epstein, who was later an investor in Samuel Belzberg's $100 million fund "Second City Capital Partners I", which was directed by Wendy's current husband Strauss Zelnick. Daughter Lisa was previously married to and has three children with American businessman and philanthropist Matthew Bronfman, son of Canadian billionaire Edgar Bronfman Sr.
