= Strauss Zelnick =

American businessman (born 1957)

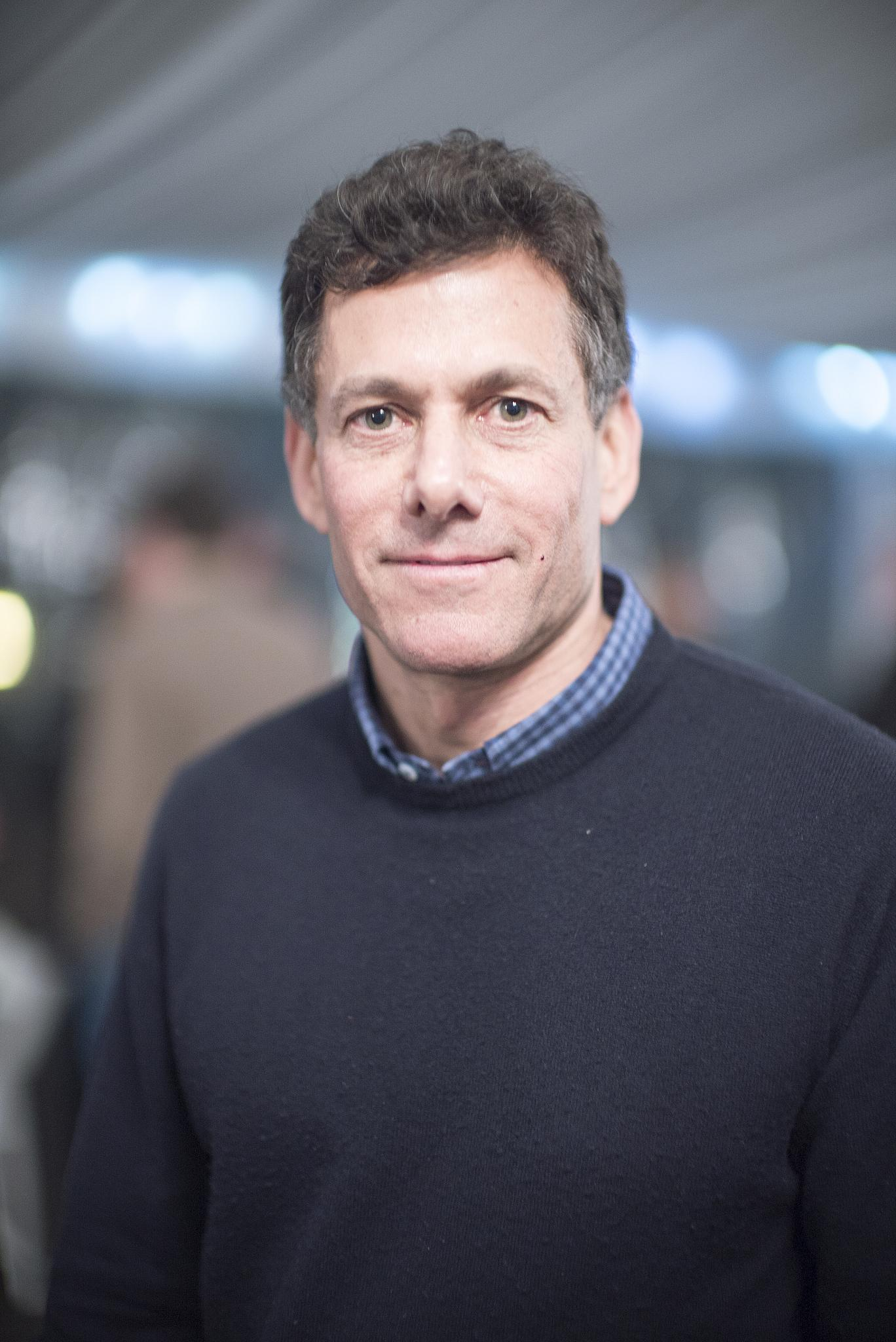
- Zelnick in 2015
- Born: Harry Strauss Zelnick; June 26, 1957 (age 69); Boston, Massachusetts, U.S.
- Education: Wesleyan University (BA); Harvard University (MBA, JD)
- Occupations: Businessman; lawyer
- Years active: 1983–present
- Known for: Chairman and CEO of Take-Two Interactive; CEO and managing partner of ZMC
- Spouse: Wendy J. Belzberg (m. 1990)
- Children: 3, including Lucas Zelnick

Harry Strauss Zelnick (born June 26, 1957) is an American businessman and lawyer. He is the founder, CEO, and managing partner of private equity firm ZMC, the chairman and CEO of video game company Take-Two Interactive, and the former chairman of media conglomerate CBS Corporation.

== Early life and education ==
Harry Strauss Zelnick was born on June 26, 1957, in Boston, Massachusetts, into a Jewish family. His mother, Susan Manello (née Strauss), died on October 22, 1967, when Harry was ten years old. He and his siblings were raised by their aunt Elsa (née Strauss) and her husband Allan Zelnick (died in 2013). He grew up in South Orange, New Jersey.

Strauss Zelnick graduated in 1975 from Columbia High School in Maplewood, New Jersey, and studied psychology and English at Wesleyan University from 1975 until 1979, obtaining a Bachelor of Arts degree with honors. During his time at Wesleyan, he was the national public relations director for the Coalition of Independent College and University Students (COPUS). Zelnick simultaneously enrolled at Harvard Business School and Harvard Law School in 1979, obtaining a Master of Business Administration degree from the former in 1982 and a Juris Doctor from the latter in 1983.

== Career ==
In 1983, he started as vice president for television international sales at Columbia Pictures International Television. In 1986, he joined Vestron Inc. as senior vice president of corporate development. He became executive vice president the following year and was promoted to president in 1988, overseeing all managing operations for the company. He quit in 1989 to join 20th Century Fox as president and COO before leaving that role in 1993 to join Crystal Dynamics. After that, he segued into becoming the CEO of BMG Entertainment from 1994 to 2000.

Zelnick is the chief executive officer and managing partner of ZMC, a private equity investment firm based in New York City specializing in leveraged buyouts and growth capital. He founded ZMC in 2001 with a starting capital of US$300,000. Following an investor-staged takeover of Take-Two Interactive in 2007, Zelnick became the chairman, chief executive officer, and largest single shareholder of Take-Two. Zelnick would be added into one of Take-Two's games, WWE 2K26, as a playable wrestler as part of an update to the game in June 2026.

Strauss Zelnick served as Chairman of the Board of the Entertainment Software Association (ESA) from July 2014 to July 2017. As of 2025, he is no longer listed as a board member of either the ESA or the Entertainment Software Rating Board (ESRB).

Zelnick was appointed to the board of CBS Corporation in 2018.

In 2021, ZMC purchased a controlling interest in The Second City, a Chicago-based comedy troupe.

== Personal life ==
Zelnick is Jewish. He has four sisters: Karen Davis, Beth Kaufman, Marci Zelnick Rodriguez, and Laurie Zelnick. His brother, Carl D. Zelnick, died in 1995. Zelnick married Wendy J. Belzberg, the daughter of Samuel Belzberg, in January 1990; their engagement was announced by Belzberg's parents in December 1989. They have two sons and a daughter. His son is comedian Lucas Zelnick.
