= Warner Theatre (Atlantic City, New Jersey) =

1929 movie palace and showroom auditorium in New Jersey, US

The Warner Theatre
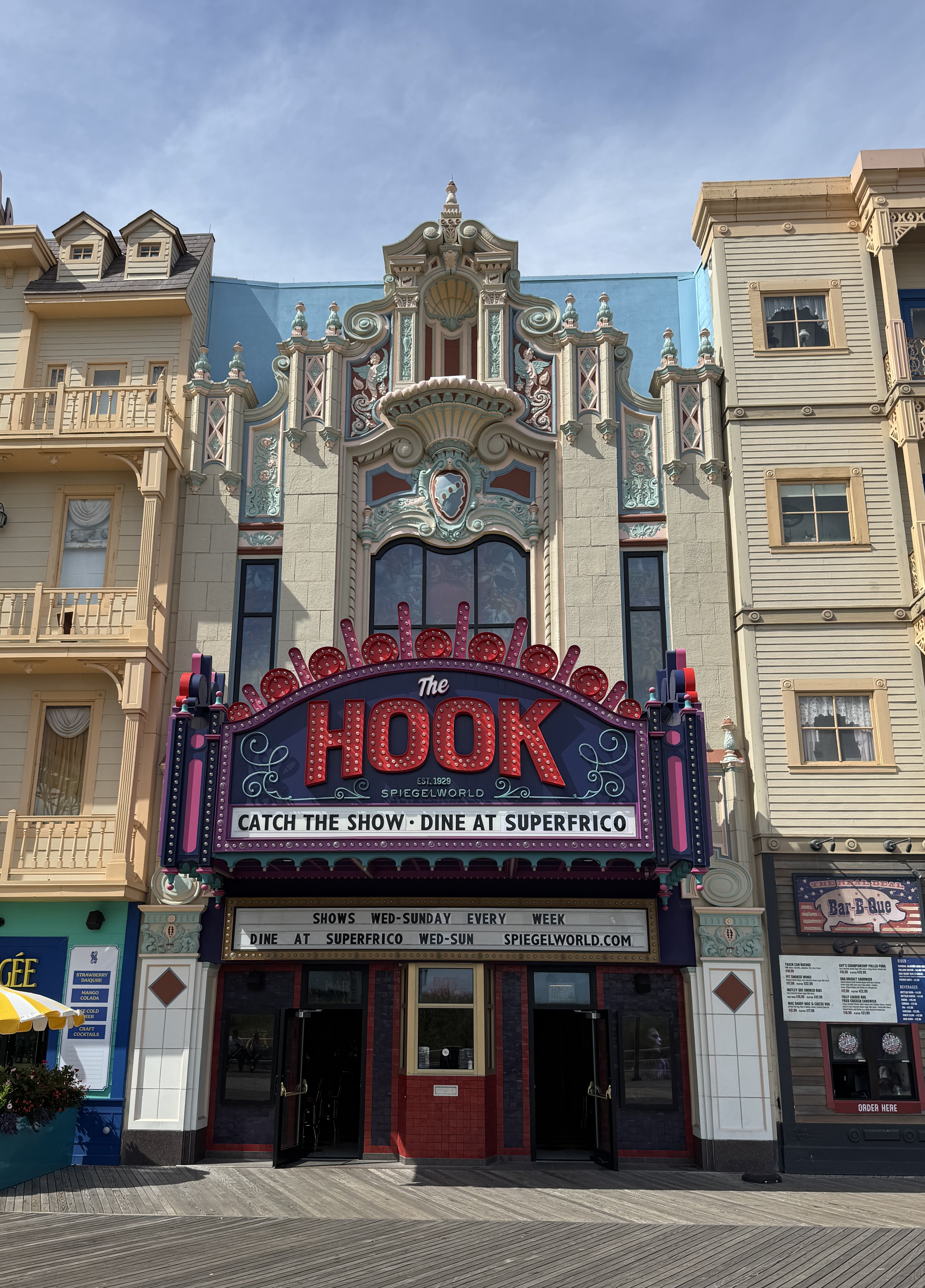
- Interactive map of The Warner Theatre
- Former names: The Warner's Embassy Theatre, The Warren Theatre
- Address: 2015 Boardwalk, Atlantic City, NJ
- Coordinates: 39°21′19″N 74°26′2″W
- Capacity: 4,270 (former); 422 (current)
- Type: Movie palace, live theater space

Construction
- Opened: 1929
- Renovated: 2023
- Demolished: 1960s-1970s (auditorium, lobby; facade saved)

Website
- spiegelworld.com/shows/the-hook/

The Warner Theatre is a former movie palace and live theater venue built in 1929 on the Atlantic City boardwalk. It reopened as a performance venue in 2023.

== Background ==
Designed by Philadelphia architectural firm Hoffman-Henon Co. and commissioned by Warner Bros. Pictures, the Warner Theatre opened in June 1929 on the boardwalk near what is now ACX1 Studios (then the Million Dollar Pier). It was built on the site of the former Great Northern Opera House. Opening as the Warner's Embassy Theatre, its first showing was the 1929 film On with the Show! plus a live stage show. The venue was built in a Spanish Moorish-Atmospheric style in the auditorium and a Venetian-style lobby. It hosted the Miss America pageant and Bess Myerson was crowned there in 1945.

In the 1950s, the venue was renamed Warren Theatre and later became a live venue for performing artists. The bulk of the theater was demolished in the early 1960s due to lack of revenue. During this period it was owned by George A. Hamid Jr. of the Hamid Circus who converted it to a bowling alley, Boardwalk Bowl, which opened in 1963. Frankie Avalon and Annette Funicello appeared at the alley to plug their film Beach Party in the summer of 1963.

By 1978, the lobby was being used as a pizza joint.

== 2020s renovation as The Hook ==
In 2023, Caesars Atlantic City and Australian theater producer Ross Mollison's Spiegelworld restored the site as a theater venue, incorporating the original ocean-facing facade, adding stained glass and opening an outpost of Las Vegas's Superfrico restaurant, serving "Italian-American psychedelic" cuisine. The permanent resident show is the adults-only "The Hook," based around Atlantic City's entertainment history. Belfast-born comedy director Cal McCrystal directs the show.

== See also ==
- Live New Jersey music venues by capacity
- Nightclubs in Atlantic City
- The Orange Loop
- Atlantic City Theater Company
