= Trenton Computer Festival =

Oldest continuously running personal computer show in the world

The Trenton Computer Festival (also called TCF), founded in 1976, is the oldest personal computer show in the world. It is considered to be the first major fair for personal computer hobbyists.

It was founded 1976 at Trenton State College (now The College of New Jersey) by Sol Libes and Allen Katz with the assistance of the Amateur Computer Group of New Jersey (ACGNJ). The initial event drew a crowd of approximately 1,500, and featured lectures, vendor tables, and an outdoor computer market, all aimed at the amateur computer hobbyist.

By 1992, it had moved to the Mercer County Community College, and by 1999 it had moved to the New Jersey Convention and Exposition Center in Edison, New Jersey. Attendance peaked at approximately 30,000 attendees per weekend around 1988, but by 2003, was down to approximately 10,000 attendees across the entire weekend. In 2005, TCF returned to The College of New Jersey to celebrate its 30th anniversary. In 2015, the event marked its 40th anniversary. In 2020, the festival was cancelled as a result of restrictions related to the COVID-19 pandemic in New Jersey. The 2021 and 2022 events were held virtually.
