= Miss'd America =

Drag pageant held in Atlantic City, New Jersey

- Formation: Early 1990s
- Founder: John Schultz; Gary Hill
- Type: Drag pageant
- Headquarters: Atlantic City, New Jersey
- Location: United States
- Producer: Rich Helfant
- Director: Mark Dahl
- Host: Carson Kressley
- Current titleholder: Amnesia Martini
- Website: missdamerica.org

Miss'd America is an annual drag pageant held in Atlantic City, New Jersey, United States. It was founded in the early 1990s as a spoof of the Miss America pageant. It ran through 2005, took a five-year hiatus, and resumed operation in 2010. Contestants compete in four categories: swimsuit, evening gown, interview and talent, with the winner receiving $5,000. Part of the proceeds from each edition of the pageant are donated to local LGBTQ charities and initiatives. The event is produced by Rich Helfant, directed by Mark Dahl, and hosted by Carson Kressley. The current reigning Miss'd America is Amnesia Martini, who was crowned on October 11, 2026.

== History and overview ==
=== Early years: formation to hiatus ===
John Schultz and Gary Hill founded Miss'd America as a themed party at their nightclub, Studio Six, in Atlantic City in the early 1990s. Sources conflict on the exact year the pageant began, with many placing the inaugural event in 1993 or 1994. Atlantic City Weekly, Gay City News and The New York Times report 1991 as the first year of the competition. Records from the United States Patent and Trademark Office list July 15, 1992, as the date of the first known use of the term "Miss'd America". Hill stated to the Courier-Post that he could not recall the start date with certainty, estimating that it was "[s]ometime during the early to mid '90s ... I dunno, I think maybe '91 or '92."

Miss'd America took its name from a longstanding joke that drag performers always "missed" the chance to participate in Miss America and that most of that pageant's gay behind-the-scenes staff "missed" out on what happened on stage. Initially, the event was always held the day after Miss America "to offer the people who'd spent two weeks working day and night on the actual Miss America event a place to party, let down their hair and kick up their heels". Miss'd America was originally satirical in nature, with the first-ever winner, Alexia Love, awarded a paper Burger King crown and a bouquet of dead roses. The second edition of the pageant took the form of a fundraiser for the AIDS Alliance of South Jersey, which brought it to wider public notice. The competition began to grow in scope in 1996, when it introduced the evening gown category. Among the earliest crowned Miss'd America titleholders were Mortimer Spreng (1995), Chunky Marinara (1997) and Chlamydia Liverpool (2001). The pageant ran annually until 2005, when it took a five-year hiatus after the Miss America headquarters relocated to Las Vegas. Studio Six went out of business the same year.

=== Recent years: 2010 to present ===
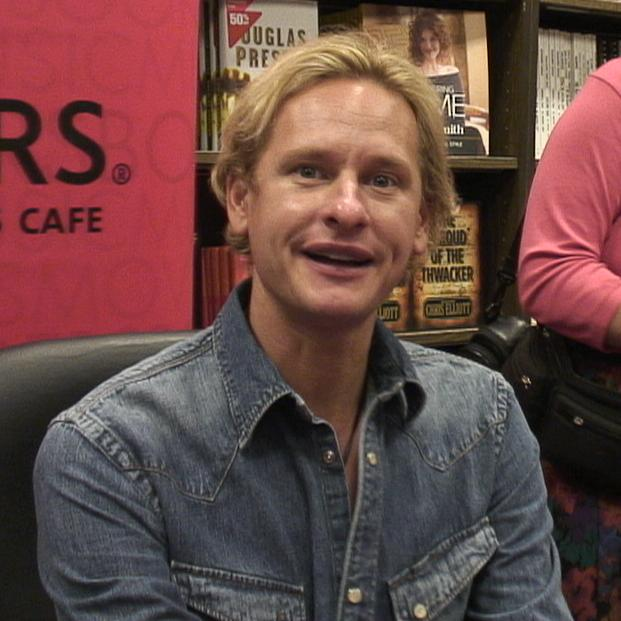
Carson Kressley has hosted Miss'd America since 2010.

When Rich Helfant, Miss'd America's current executive producer, founded the Greater Atlantic City GLBT Alliance in 2010, he approached Schultz and Hill with a proposal to revive the pageant as a fundraising event for the charity. Schultz and Hill agreed, and Miss'd America resumed operation on January 31, 2010. Atlantic City tourism outlets, casinos and hotels embraced the pageant's return, nodding to the city's "historically vibrant gay culture" and hoping to draw in revenue from new sources. Some billed it as "Atlantic City's main event" that year. Harrah's Atlantic City, Trump Entertainment Resorts and Grey Goose all sponsored the 2010 pageant, which was held in Boardwalk Hall. The year's judging panel included Village Voice journalist Michael Musto, Philadelphia Gay News publisher Mark Segal and horseback rider Annika Bruggeworth.

In its present form, Miss'd America is professionally staged, directed and choreographed; takes place in a popular Atlantic City hotel or entertainment venue; and structurally resembles its mainstream counterpart, requiring contestants to compete in four categories, issuing a cash prize, and featuring a celebrity guest performer each year. It is currently written and directed by Mark Dahl. Bob Hitchen, the show's original writer, served as director until 2011. Carson Kressley has hosted the pageant since 2010. In 2013, Michelle Visage served as host in Kressley's place.

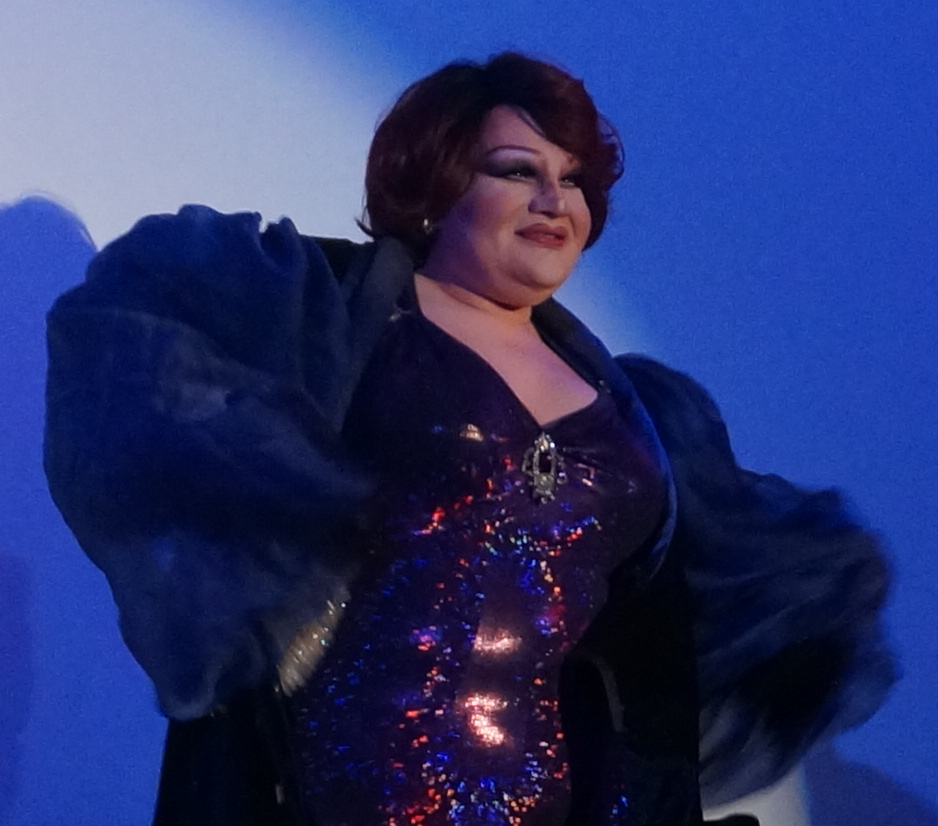
Miss'd America 2013, Victoria "Porkchop" Parker

The Miss'd America 2012 pageant was held in January of that year, but the next edition of the contest was not held until September 2013. There, Victoria "Porkchop" Parker was named Miss'd America 2013. However, the title year was then redefined to be the coming rather than the concluding year, and the September 2014 pageant winner, Honey Davenport, was crowned Miss'd America 2015. Consequently, the title of Miss'd America 2014 was never issued. Prior to the 2014 contest, Logo TV founder Matt Farber created a YouTube video series profiling several of that year's contestants as well as former winners. Comedian Randy Rainbow hosted the series.

Each year, the pageant gives a portion of its profits to the Greater Atlantic City GLBT Alliance and to other local LGBT charities and causes, such as the Schultz–Hill Foundation. In 2010, Miss'd America's comeback year, proceeds went to AIDS charities such as the William Way Center and the South Jersey AIDS Alliance. As of September 2022, the pageant's charitable donations totaled more than $500,000.

The 2021 edition of Miss'd America, originally scheduled to take place in September 2020, was postponed until 2021 due to the COVID-19 pandemic. In August 2021, the pageant announced it would return on October 23 of that year. The evening featured a guest performance by Thelma Houston.

==== Controversy over the ban of transgender participants ====
The Miss'd America 2020 competition was surrounded by controversy over the fact that the eligibility requirements were updated to ban transgender participants in early 2019. Though some of the pageant's past winners were trans women, Helfant stated to Instinct magazine,

The bottom line is, the Miss'd American [sic] pageant is a male drag pageant. That is how its [sic] incorporated, that is how it's registered, its licensing, its trademark, all of those things with the US Patent office are listed as a male drag pageant, To [sic] allow anyone other than a man to compete in the pageant violates it's [sic] trademark."

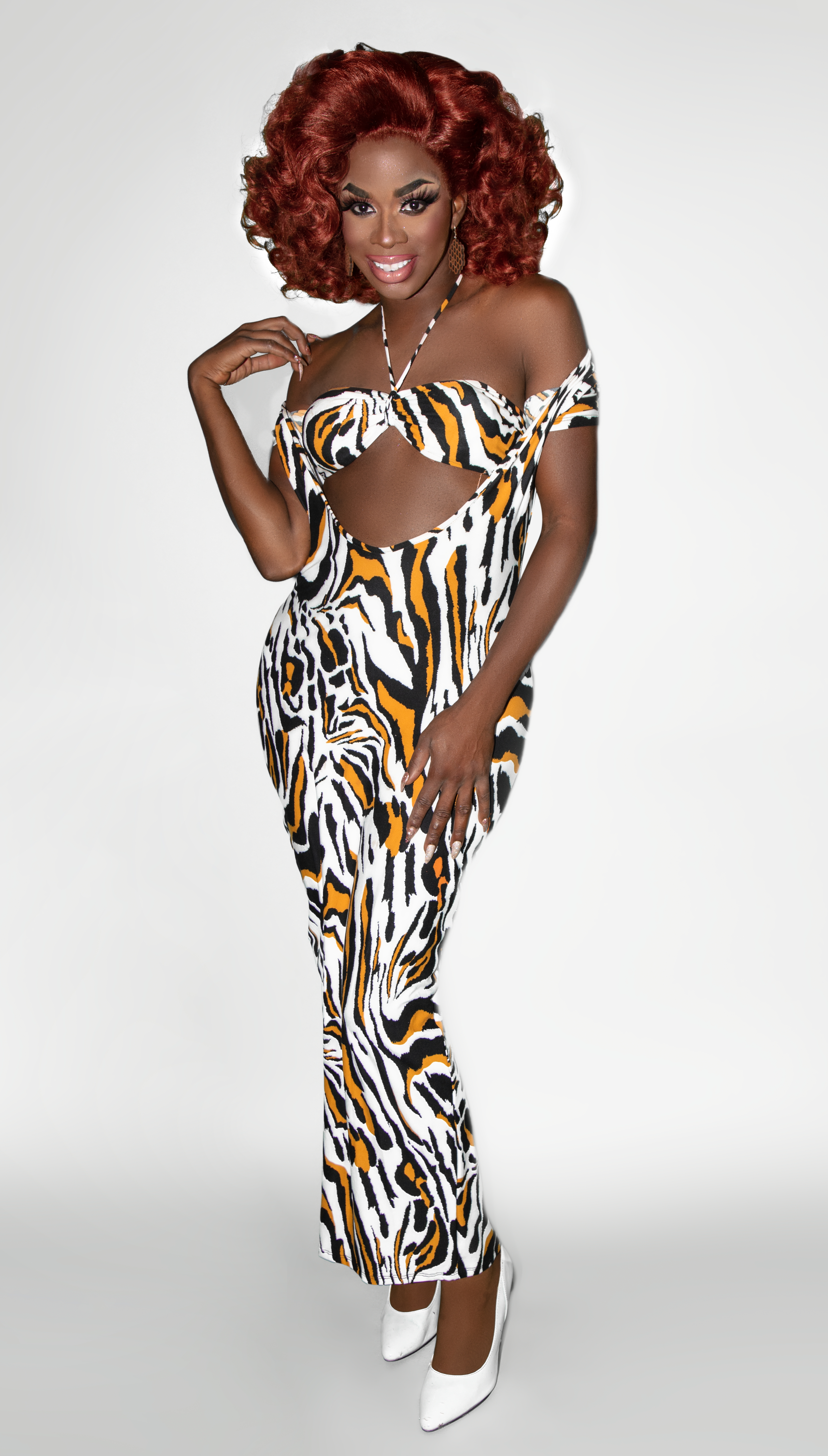
Miss'd America 2015, Honey Davenport

Hill reinforced Helfant's stance and said he did not remember whether any past winners were transgender. Because of the exclusionary change to the entrance criteria, the Borgata Hotel Casino & Spa, where Miss'd America had been housed since 2014, withdrew its offer to host the contest again. As a result, the pageant relocated to the Hard Rock Hotel & Casino. Several former Miss'd America titleholders spoke out against the policy change. Honey Davenport said:

While I will forever be moved and appreciative of the work done by the Greater Atlantic City LGBT Alliance [sic], I no longer agree with some of the policies of the Miss'd America Pageant.... [S]ince I was crowned, I have repeatedly watched my fellow former winners fight against the Board of Directors of the pageant for inclusivity. The board refuses to allow anyone identifying as female, whether by birth or transition, to compete in their pageant. It has taken me some time, but have [sic] decided I can no longer support them while that policy is in place.

Miss'd America 2017, Mimi Imfurst, stated to Philadelphia Gay News:

The contributions to the drag community by trans, genderqueer and nonconforming people have been undeniably at the core of what drag is. By writing this statement I am aware that I am jeopardizing my relationship with the pageant organizers, however when I won, I spoke during my Q&A portion of the pageant about creating change using your voice, and I feel like if I didn't speak up for trans drag performers, I would be doing a disservice to what the title of Miss'd America represents. Hopefully, the organizers can recognize that it is time to do the right thing and recognize that audience members will embrace inclusion, celebrate it, and I suspect [the pageant] will raise even more money for the community.

=== Relationship with Miss America ===
In the 1990s, the Miss America Organization frowned on Miss'd America and encouraged its contestants, employees and volunteers to keep their distance from the drag pageant. The organization went as far as threatening legal action to prevent Miss'd America from taking place, though charges were never brought to court. A number of high-profile people associated with Miss America defied the organization: Miss America 1993, Leanza Cornett, attended Miss'd America after crowning her successor. Mary Kay Marks, the widow of former Miss America pageant chief Albert A. Marks Jr., served as a Miss'd America guest judge in 1996. Miss America 1998, Kate Shindle, performed a song at Miss'd America following her victory.

Prior to Miss'd America's hiatus, it was tradition for its contestants to attend the Miss America pageant parade, where they called out to Miss America hopefuls, "Show us your shoes!" This was done under the joke premise that anyone found to have exceptionally large feet could be a drag queen infiltrating the mainstream pageant. Over time, the Miss America parade came to be formally known as the Show Us Your Shoes Parade, a name it retains to present day. When Miss'd America resumed in 2010, the Miss America Organization complained that the winner's crown bore too strong a resemblance to the one awarded at Miss America. As the drag pageant grew in size and influence, however, the relationship between it and its namesake improved. Before the 2013 editions of both pageants, executives of the Miss America Organization and that year's celebrity judges attended a dinner reception held by Schultz and Hill.

== Format ==
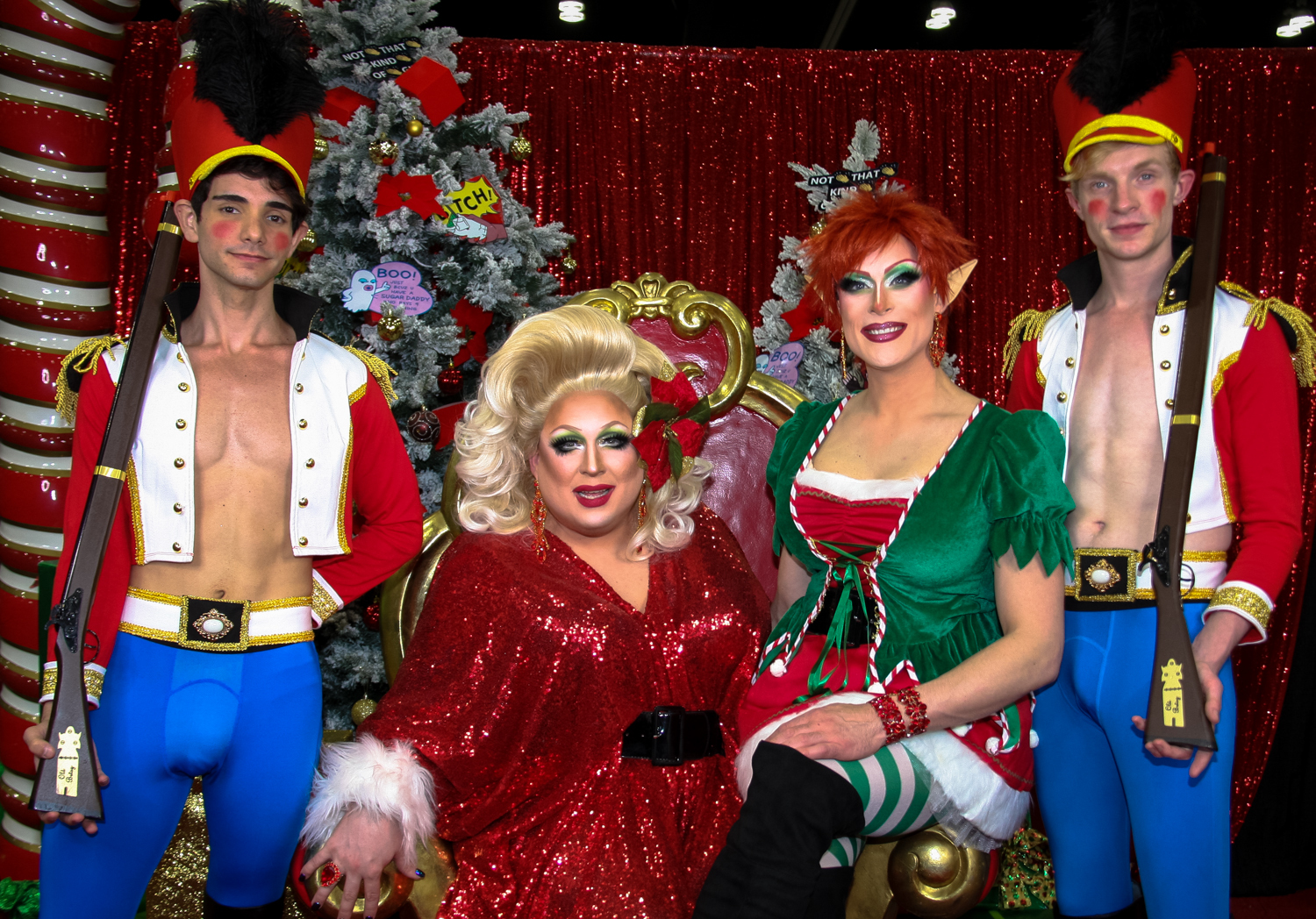
Miss'd America 2017, Mimi Imfurst (second from left)

Contestants of at least 21 years of age from anywhere in the United States can apply to compete in Miss'd America, though the majority of entrants are based in the Northeast. In the first round of the process, each candidate submits a three-minute video of their talent together with an application form, and the judging panel selects the year's finalists from this pool. The finalists travel to Atlantic City to compete in a live show featuring swimsuit, evening gown, interview and talent categories. The live final carries a different theme each year, such as the circus (2013), America (2018) or superheroes (2020). The winner receives a $5,000 prize and is crowned Miss'd America for the coming year, during which she is to make appearances at events such as Pride celebrations and is to serve as an ambassador of the Greater Atlantic City GLBT Alliance. Some editions of the pageant have also crowned first and second runners-up, who receive $2,500 and $1,500, respectively. These cash prizes have increased steeply in recent years; the grand prize was $1,500 at the 2016 contest but rose to its present value of $5,000 two years later.

The 2020 pageant introduced the title of Miss'd Popularity, which is determined via public web vote. The first contestant to receive that honor was Nicole Onoscopi, who placed as first runner-up in the main competition. That year also marked the first time that Miss'd America was live streamed.

== Recent titleholders ==
Title year	Winner	Legal name	Crowning venue	First runner-up	Second runner-up	Ref(s)
2027	Amnesia Martini		Caesars Atlantic City	Bev		
2026	Cherry Poppins	Michael Samhat	Caesars Atlantic City	The Countess Mascara	Tiffany FoXXX	
2025	Aria B. Cassadine	Quentin Reynolds	Caesars Atlantic City			
2024	Freeda Kulo		Hard Rock Hotel & Casino Atlantic City			
2023	Miss Elaine	Scott McMaster	Hard Rock Hotel & Casino Atlantic City	Venus Mystique	Maria TopCatt	
2022	Amanda Pörq	Ethan L. Wintgens	Hard Rock Hotel & Casino Atlantic City	Miss Elaine	The Countess Mascara	
2020–2021 (Note: The Miss'd America 2021 pageant was canceled due to the COVID-19 pandemic, and Cristál's reign was extended to cover both 2020 and 2021.)	Sapphira Cristál	O'Neill Nichol Haynes	Hard Rock Hotel & Casino Atlantic City	Nicole Onoscopi (Note: Nicole Onoscopi was also voted Miss'd Popularity by the public. The 2020 pageant was the first one to issue this title.)	The Countess Mascara	
2019	Adriana Trenta	Kevin Swanson	Borgata Hotel Casino & Spa	Shelby Late		
2018	Pattaya Hart	Methawee Sayampol	Borgata Hotel Casino & Spa	Sapphira Cristál	Tina Burner	
2017	Mimi Imfurst	Braden Maurer-Burns or Braden Chapman	Borgata Hotel Casino & Spa			
2016	FiFi DuBois	James Mullady	Borgata Hotel Casino & Spa	Pattaya Hart	Alexis Michelle	
2015	Honey Davenport	James Heath-Clark	Borgata Hotel Casino & Spa			
2014	Title not granted.					
2013	Victoria "Porkchop" Parker	Victor Bowling	Showboat Atlantic City	Margeaux Powell	Dallas DuBois	
2012	Sabel Scities	Timothy Byars	Boardwalk Hall	Victoria "Porkchop" Parker		
2011	Kitty Hiccups	David Hyland	Boardwalk Hall			
2010	Michelle Dupree	Scott Cooper	Boardwalk Hall			

== See also ==
- Garden State Equality
- LGBT history in Atlantic City
- Jersey Pride
- The Orange Loop
