= The Empress Hotel (New Jersey) =

Hotel in New Jersey, United States

Coordinates: 40.21838°N 74.00180°W

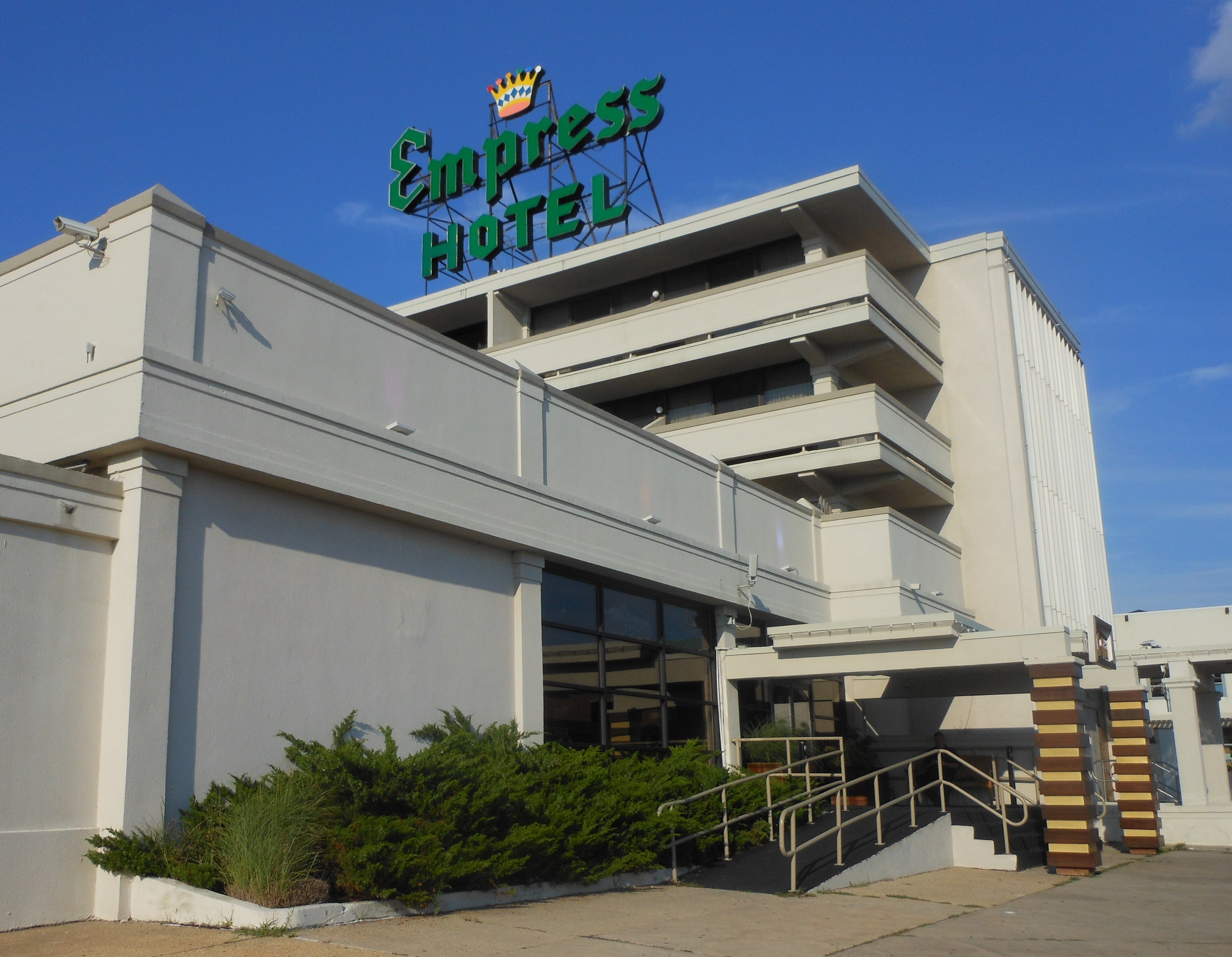
- Interactive map of the The Empress Hotel area

General information
- Location: 101 Asbury Avenue, Asbury Park, New Jersey, United States 07712
- Opening: 1961
- Owner: Shep Pettibone

Technical details
- Floor count: 4

Other information
- Number of rooms: 101
- Number of restaurants: 1

Website
- Official Website

The Empress Hotel is a popular gay resort located in Asbury Park, New Jersey.

The Hotel opened as a luxury resort for vacationing families in the 1960s. It was a successful resort, attracting the likes of Judy Garland and Liza Minnelli.

In 1980, the Empress was featured on the picture sleeve of Bruce Springsteen's hit single "Hungry Heart", which depicts a photo of Springsteen standing near a phone booth on the Asbury Park boardwalk, with the hotel visible in the background. Springsteen was an early employee of the Empress, where he worked a busboy during the summer of 1962.

By the summer of 1976, Asbury Park was in a state of decline, albeit the Empress Hotel remained a popular establishment. During a New York Times interview, the hotel's manager boasted: "all of our 101 rooms are taken!". By 1988 the hotel was struggling for business, and closed shortly after.

A strip club, Extreme Fahrenheit, opened in the building in 1993. It became notorious for drugs and prostitution, and was eventually closed because of lewd conduct.

In 1998, Shep Pettibone bought the abandoned building and opened the Paradise Nightclub inside.

The nightclub lured crowds of gay travelers away from Fire Island and instead to the beaches of Asbury Park. The hotel portion reopened in August 2004, and is very popular among gay, lesbian, bisexual, and transgender travelers in New Jersey.

In 2008 a dining establishment, the Ketchup Grill, opened inside. A clothing store, Esphera, catering to gay beach-goers, was added to the ground level in 2008 and is open during the summer months.

The hotel also features a gift shop, lounge, nightclub and outdoor pool.

== See also ==
- History of gay life in Asbury Park
- LGBT history in Atlantic City
- Jersey Pride (the state's annual gay pride parade)
