= White House Sub Shop =

Coordinates: 39.35918°N 74.44062°W

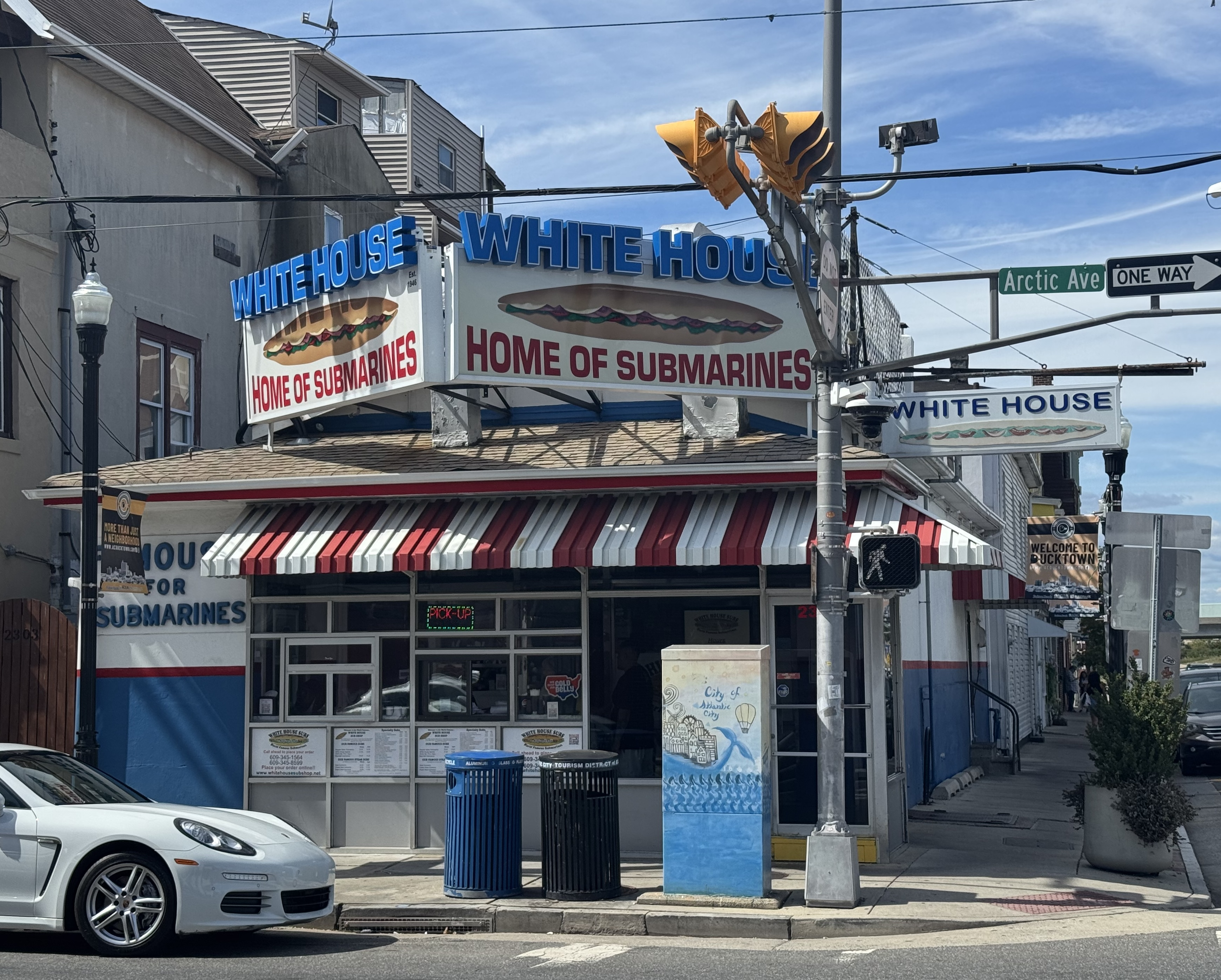
- Interactive map of White House Sub Shop

Restaurant information
- Established: 1946; 80 years ago
- Owners: Basile & Sacco-Conley Families
- Previous owner: Anthony Basile
- Food type: American
- Location: 2301 Arctic Ave (original flagship location); 1000 Boardwalk (Hard Rock Hotel & Casino Atlantic City expansion location), Atlantic City, New Jersey, 08401, United States
- Website: whitehousesubshop.net

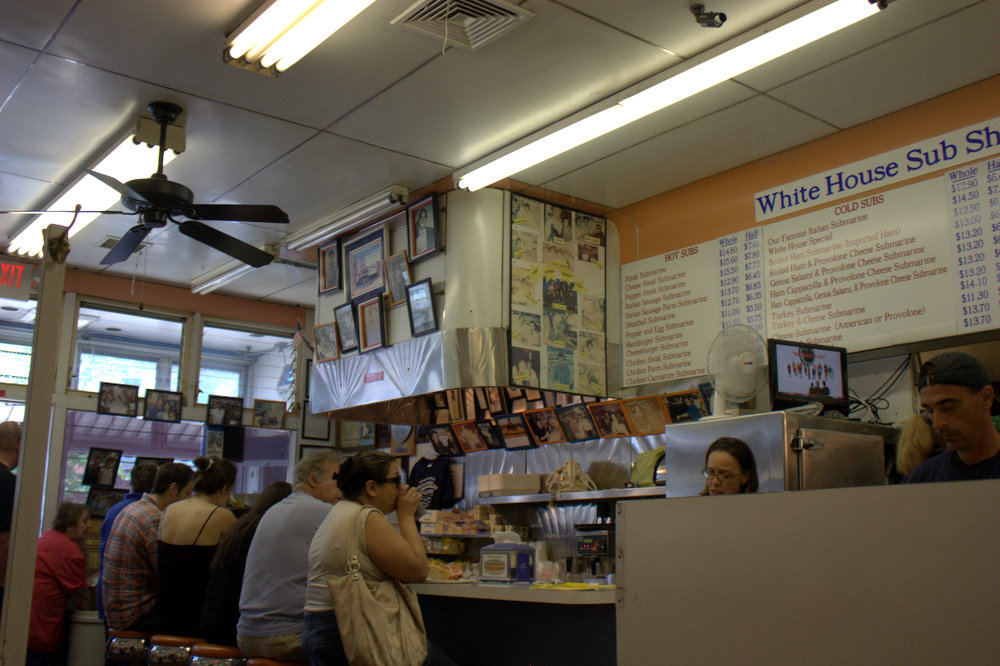
The counter in May 2011

White House Sub Shop is a submarine sandwich deli founded in 1946 at Atlantic City, New Jersey, United States, which sells various specialty sandwiches. The deli is considered a historic landmark and has served multiple celebrities.

== History ==
The White House Sub Shop was founded in 1946 on Arctic Ave in Atlantic City by Anthony "Tony" Basile along with his Aunt Basilia and Uncle Alfred "Fritz" Sacco. Prior to that date, the front of the building on Arctic Ave. was Mr. Basile's tailor shop. While business was scarce during WWII, his wife would sell sandwiches (on breads that she purchased from Formica's bakery across the street) that she made in her kitchen out of the back side door. After the war, he decided to close his tailor shop and open the front of the building as a cold "submarine" sandwich shop. The fountain and grill hood found today in the front were from the original store. The family still lived in the back of the store at that time. Later, the back was remodeled as it appears today to add grills, boards and more room for storage. In the very back were two old-fashioned pin ball machines for many years.

They have been popular among locals and tourists alike, attracting numerous celebrities, including Frank Sinatra, Dean Martin, Jerry Lewis, Oprah Winfrey, Rocky Marciano, Joe DiMaggio, Donald Trump, several Miss Americas, and others. After The Beatles played a concert in Atlantic City in 1964, they stopped by at the White House Sub Shop for a 72-inch hoagie.

The White House Sub Shop is known for its cold and hot submarine sandwiches that measure roughly two feet in length. Notable sandwiches include the Italian sub, their own creation, the White House Special, and cheesesteaks.

=== Expansion ===
It has remained in its original location with an additional expansion in the Trump Taj Mahal. The expansion location temporarily closed down when the Trump Taj Mahal closed down in the fall of 2016, but was later reopened at the Hard Rock Hotel & Casino Atlantic City in the summer of 2018.

== Ratings ==
In 2000, the White House Sub Shop was named an American classic and was considered number 3 in the top 20 Jersey Food Experiences You Must Try Before You Die.
