= Hard Rock Hotel & Casino Atlantic City =

Integrated resort in New Jersey, United States

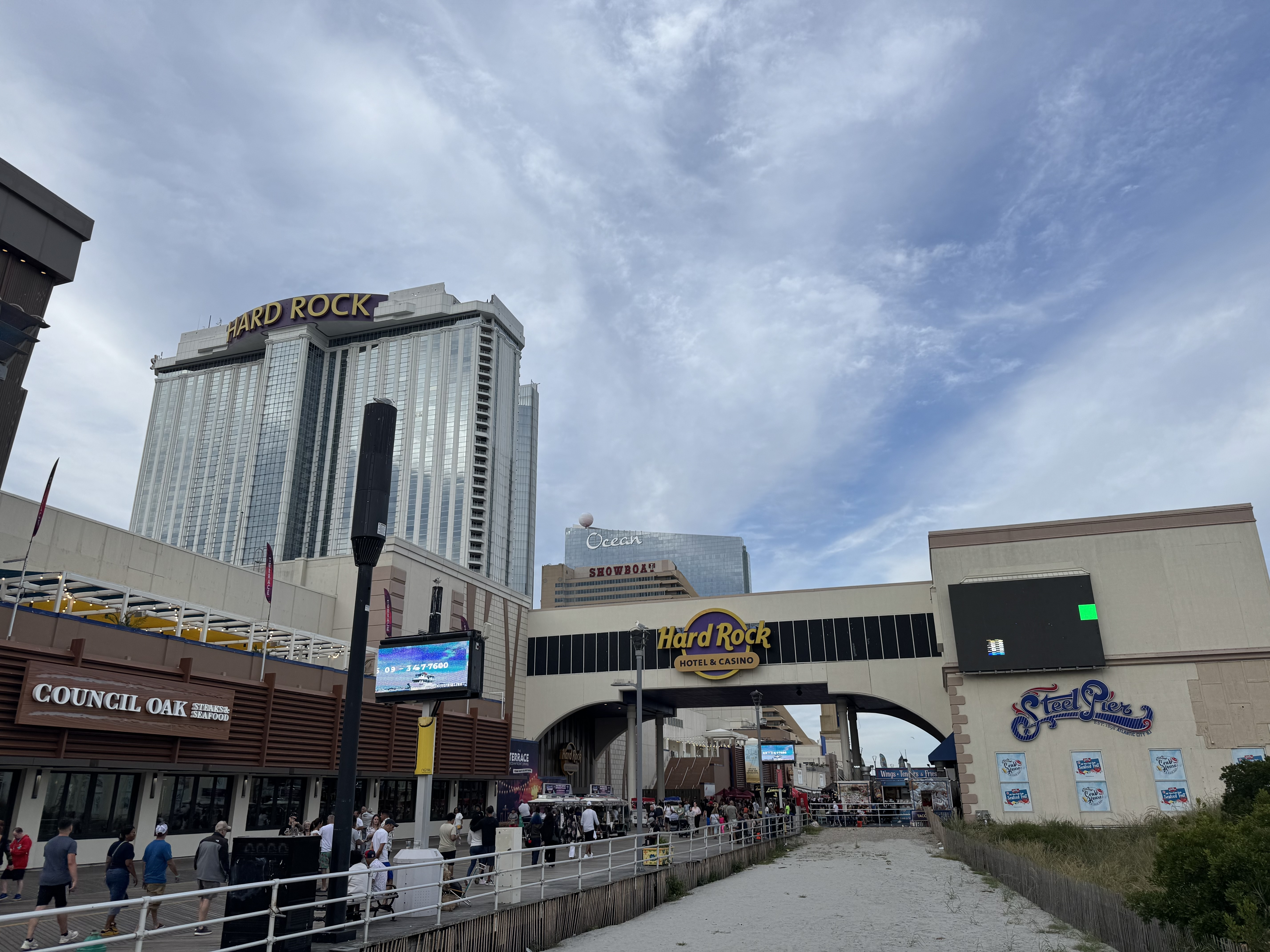
- Exterior view (August 2025)
- Interactive map of Hard Rock Hotel & Casino Atlantic City
- Location: Atlantic City, New Jersey, U.S.; 1000 Boardwalk; 39.3587°N 74.4198°W
- Opened: April 2, 1990; 36 years ago (as Trump Taj Mahal); June 27, 2018; 8 years ago (as Hard Rock)
- Closed: October 10, 2016; 10 years ago (as Trump Taj Mahal)
- Theme: Indian palace (as Trump Taj Mahal); Rock and roll (as Hard Rock)
- No. of rooms: 2,032
- Gaming space: 167,000 square feet (15,500 m^{2})
- Signature attractions: Hard Rock Live at Mark G. Etess Arena
- Notable restaurants: Hard Rock Cafe; Council Oak Steaks & Seafood; The Sugar Factory; Fresh Harvest Buffet; Il Mulino; The Flavor Tour; White House Sub Shop; Fralinger's Salt Water Taffy; Youyu Noodle Bar; Trattoria Il Mulino
- Casino type: Land-based
- Owner: Boardwalk 1000, LLC (a joint venture between Hard Rock International and Edgewood Properties)
- Operating license holder: Hard Rock International
- Architect: Friedmutter Group and the Harman Group (Chairman/North Tower); Francis Xavier Dumont (main casino and Taj/South Tower); SOSH Architects and Klai Juba Wald Architecture + Interiors (Hard Rock)
- Previous names: Resorts Taj Mahal (planning); Trump Taj Mahal (1990–2016)
- Renovated in: 2006–2007; October 2, 2008 (Chairman/North Tower); 2018; 2021
- Website: casino.hardrock.com/atlantic-city

The Hard Rock Hotel & Casino Atlantic City, formerly the Trump Taj Mahal, is an integrated resort on the Boardwalk, owned by Boardwalk 1000, LLC, a joint venture between Hard Rock International and Edgewood Properties, in Atlantic City, New Jersey, United States.

The casino was inaugurated in 1990 by its owner, Donald Trump, and was built at a total cost of nearly $1 billion. Original restaurants at the Taj Mahal included Hard Rock Cafe, Sultan's Feast, Dynasty, Il Mulino New York, Moon at Dynasty, and Robert's Steakhouse. It was also the home of Scores, the country's first in-casino strip club. The Taj Mahal came to the brink of closure in 2014 as its parent company went through bankruptcy, but ultimately remained open under the new ownership of Icahn Enterprises. In 2015, the Taj Mahal admitted to having "willfully violated" anti-money-laundering regulations for years and was fined $10 million. It was the highest penalty ever levied by the U.S. federal government against a casino. On August 3, 2016, it was announced that the Trump Taj Mahal would close after Labor Day because it was losing millions of dollars each month. It was closed on October 10, 2016.

On March 1, 2017, the Seminole Tribe of Florida through its Hard Rock International brand, and the Morris and Jingoli families, announced its purchase of the facility and conversion to the Hard Rock Hotel and Casino brand. It reopened on June 27, 2018, a day earlier than planned. The Etess Arena, named for a Trump Organization executive who was responsible for conducting boxing matches in Atlantic City, and was intended to host major events upon completion when he was killed in an October 1989 helicopter crash, is a performance venue at the resort, now known as Hard Rock Live at Mark G. Etess Arena.

== History ==
=== 1983–2016: As Trump Taj Mahal ===
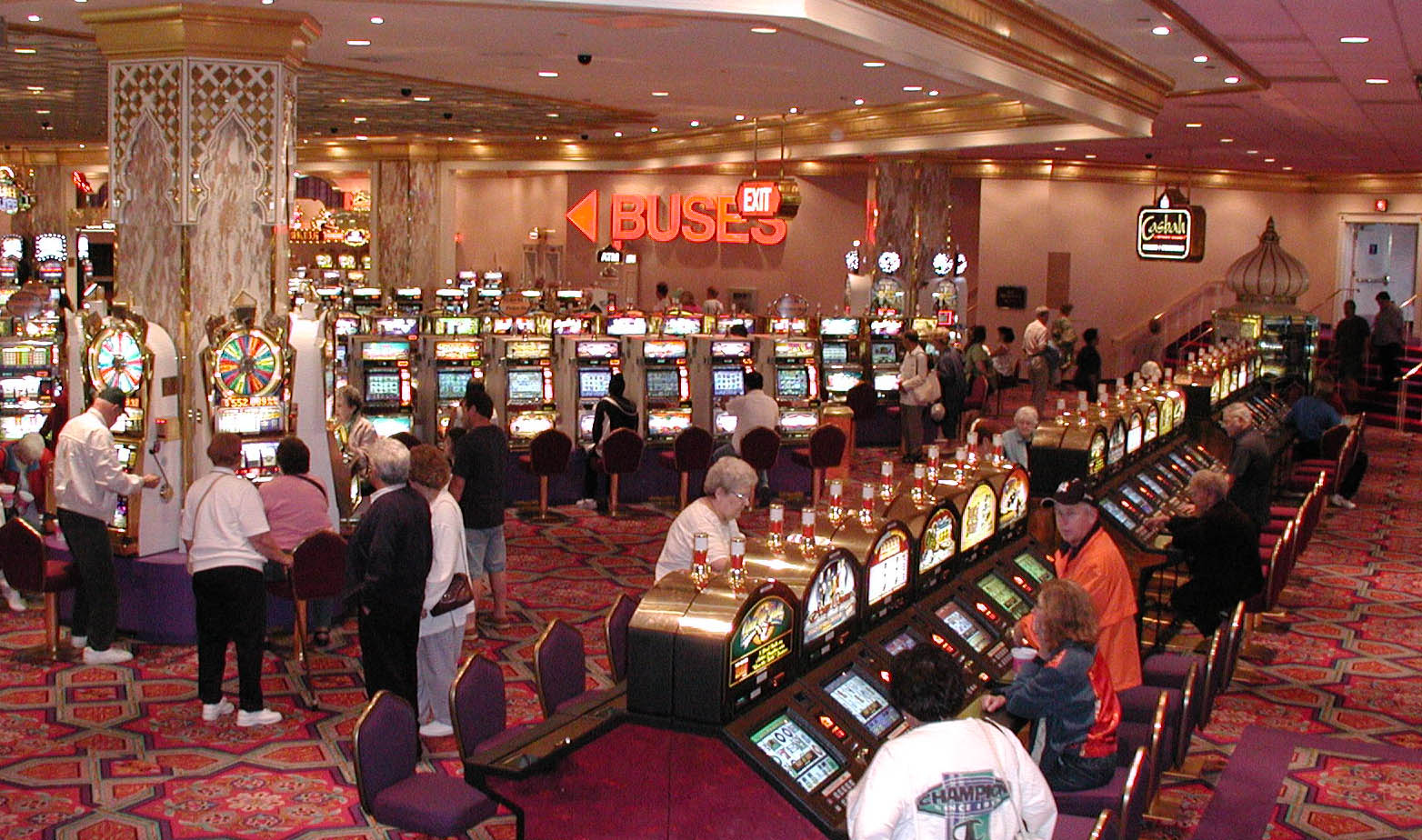
Trump Taj Mahal casino floor, c. August 2004

Construction commenced in 1983 by Resorts International, owner of the neighboring Resorts Casino Hotel, with an estimated budget of $250 million. Resorts head James Crosby said it might be named the United States Hotel, in reference to the city's first major hotel.

After Crosby's death in April 1986, Resorts International became a takeover target. The Taj Mahal had encountered construction problems, and Crosby's heirs, lacking experience in large development projects, doubted their ability to complete it successfully. Donald J. Trump, who owned two other Atlantic City casinos, beat out several other bidders to purchase a controlling stake in the company for $79 million in July 1987. Trump was appointed chairman of Resorts International, and said he would complete the Taj Mahal in about a year. Because New Jersey law prohibited anyone from owning more than three casinos, Trump planned to close the original Resorts casino and operate it as a hotel annex to the Taj Mahal.

As the total budget had ballooned to $930 million, Resorts sought to raise $550 million to complete the Taj Mahal, but struggled to find the financing. With the company claiming to be near bankruptcy in early 1988, Trump made a tender offer to buy all outstanding stock for $22 a share, stating that he was willing to personally finance the construction but only if he owned the entire company. Television producer Merv Griffin made an unexpected offer to purchase the company for $35 a share, sparking a highly publicized takeover battle, with Trump and Griffin filing lawsuits against each other.

The two ultimately reached a settlement, which was executed in November 1988, with Griffin purchasing the company, and Trump purchasing the Taj Mahal from the company for $273 million. Trump raised $675 million to finance the purchase and completion of the casino, primarily through junk bonds with a 14% interest rate. The casino opened on April 2, 1990 with 120,000 square feet (11,000 m^{2}) of gaming space, claimed to be the largest casino in the world, though this was disputed by the Riviera, and billed itself as the "eighth wonder of the world." An elaborate grand opening ceremony was held three days later. In 1991, the Taj Mahal went through a prepackaged bankruptcy, resulting in Trump giving a 50 percent stake in the business to its bondholders in exchange for lowered interest rates and a longer payoff schedule.

In 1996, Trump's new publicly traded company, Trump Hotels & Casino Resorts, purchased Taj Mahal in a transaction that valued the property at $890 million. In the 1990s, Trump's Taj Mahal casino was "the world's largest, most flamboyant casino" and Trump took on an "enormous amount of debt" to launch it. During eighteen months after its April 2, 1990 opening, when the Casino was on the verge of bankruptcy, it became the "preferred gambling spot for Russian mobsters living in Brooklyn, according to federal investigators who tracked organized crime in New York City". In 1998, Department of the Treasury's Financial Crimes Enforcement Network announced that Trump Taj Mahal Associates had paid a civil money penalty of $477,000 for failing to file reports required by the Bank Secrecy Act. In 2001, the building hosted the UFC 31 and UFC 32 events, which were the first UFC cards held during the leadership of Dana White.

The Taj Mahal was the highest grossing casino in the city until the opening of The Borgata in 2003. On October 2, 2008, the Chairman Tower opened, bringing the complex to over 2,000 rooms. In July 2013, the Taj Mahal opened the nation's first casino strip club, featuring scantily clad dancers.

==== 2014 bankruptcy and closure ====
Trump Entertainment Resorts filed for Chapter 11 bankruptcy on September 9, 2014, and announced plans to close the Taj Mahal on November 13 if the casino did not get concessions from its unions. The sister property, the Trump Plaza, closed permanently on September 16, 2014.

Workers from the casino marched to Mayor Don Guardian's office on the morning of November 3, 2014 to ask him to reconsider granting concessions, which the casino said were necessary to remain open. About 1,000 employees signed a petition calling on the mayor and other officials "to do everything possible" to keep the casino open. At the time, four of twelve casinos in Atlantic City had closed and the Trump Taj Mahal would have been the fifth if it were to close. In filing a revised reorganization plan in a Delaware bankruptcy court, Trump Entertainment Resorts said its board had approved a shutdown of the casino by December 12, 2014. The shutdown date was later pushed back to December 20. On December 18, two days before the scheduled closure, the labor union UNITE HERE! reached a deal with Trump Entertainment Resorts that saved the Taj from closing. The same day, billionaire Carl Icahn committed $20 million in financing for the Taj.

On November 14, 2014, Trump Entertainment Resorts announced that the casino would shut down in December unless its main union, UNITE HERE, dropped its appeal of a court-ordered cost-savings package, which had effectively canceled the workers' health insurance and pension coverage. However, it was revealed that the closing was to happen because it had not received the state and local tax breaks it sought.

In February 2016, Trump Entertainment Resorts exited bankruptcy and became a subsidiary of Icahn Enterprises. The casino retained the name "Trump Taj Mahal," though Donald Trump no longer held any ownership stake. In April, another Icahn affiliate, Tropicana Entertainment, took over the property under a management agreement. Icahn also stated he would withhold a planned $100-million investment into the property if New Jersey approved casinos in the northern region of the state.

On October 10, 2016, the Trump Taj Mahal Hotel and Casino officially closed its doors amidst chaos of casino workers on strike. After the closing on that date, one UNITE HERE's leader raised the possibility that the casino would remain closed over the winter but will reopen in the spring of 2017 as a non-union facility, an attempt that he said would try to prompt a union boycott.

=== 2018–present: Redevelopment as Hard Rock ===
On March 1, 2017, Hard Rock International announced plans to spend $300 million to purchase the resort and renovate it into the Hard Rock Hotel & Casino Atlantic City, after the cancellation of a previous project of the same name in September 2012 because of financial problems from marketing conditions. It reopened as the Hard Rock Hotel & Casino Atlantic City on June 27, 2018.

In November 2018, the Hard Rock announced a plan to launch both online and retail sportsbooks in the following year. In January 2019, the online sportsbook was launched making it the 10th sportsbook app in New Jersey. On January 25, 2020, Scores Nightclub officially closed down, and on February 1 of that year, Robert's Steakhouse would follow.

On June 15, 2022, UNITE HERE union members voted overwhelming in favor of a strike if their agreement is not made by July 3. UNITE HERE Local 54, which represents workers at the casino as well as other casinos in Atlantic City demanded a raise in wages to help cover financial setbacks from the pandemic and increases in living costs.

== Money laundering ==
Over its years of operation from 1990 to 2016, the Trump Taj Mahal was, according to National Public Radio business correspondent, Jim Zarroli, "repeatedly cited for having inadequate money-laundering controls, not an unusual charge in the gaming business".

In February 2015, the U.S. Department of the Treasury's Financial Crimes Enforcement Network settled an investigation of the Trump Taj Mahal with the assessment of a $10 million civil fine for "significant and long-standing money laundering violations" which were described as "willful and repeated" contraventions of the record-keeping and reporting requirements of the Bank Secrecy Act. It was the highest penalty ever levied by the U.S. Federal Government against a casino.

The casino agreed to periodic external audits to comply with anti-money laundering statutes, and admitted to multiple violations as part of its settlement. The U.S. Treasury made note of casino violations dating back to 1998, when the Trump Taj Mahal paid a $477,700 fine for violating currency transaction requirements, as well as violations in 2003, 2010, and in 2012, for which the company was "repeatedly warned". The Trump Taj Mahal was "far from meeting" standards required to protect the U.S. financial system "from exploitation from criminals, terrorists, and other bad actors", the Treasury said in a press release.

In 2017, CNN obtained access to U.S. Treasury Department documents under the Freedom of Information Act (FOIA) which included the 1998 and the 2015 settlement.

== Controversies ==
=== Alleged organized crime links ===
A 218-page U.S. Senate Subcommittee report, "Asian Organized Crime: the New International Criminal", released in 1992 linked Trump's businesses to Asian organized crime.

The Senate subcommittee named Danny Sau Keung Leung, who had been the Trump Taj Mahal's vice president of foreign marketing since 2000, as an associate of the Hong Kong-based organized crime group 14K Triad linked to "murders, extortions and heroin smuggling". Leung worked at the Trump Taj Mahal from 1990 to 1995. He was "known by law enforcement to be linked to organized crime syndicates" and was investigated by the New Jersey Casino Control Commission in 1995 with hearings in Atlantic City regarding his "background and character". "Mentions of Trump businesses" were "sprinkled throughout the 1992 Senate report on "Asian organized crime in the United States". "Crime bosses who ran the Chinatown bus system put together trips to Trump businesses in Atlantic City. [O]ther people with links to organized crime booked shows at Trump venues and in 1987, one was indicted on a charge of providing kickbacks to executives at Trump Castle." According to an Internal Revenue Service report cited in a 2016 Politifact article by Linda Qui, Trump also worked closely with other members and associates of organized criminal enterprises, including Danny Leung, Felix Sater, Salvatore Testa, and Kenneth Shapiro". In 1984, Canadian police had identified Leung as "a major player in Toronto organized crime," yet in 1989, the New Jersey Casino Control Commission granted him the casino "key license reserved for executives" and he began working for the Trump Taj Mahal in 1990. At the New Jersey Casino Control Commission hearing in 1994, Trump sent Taj President Dennis Gomes to "testify on Leung's behalf at the hearing New Jersey Casino Control Commission. In spite of an objection of the Division of Gaming Enforcement and the testimony of Canadian police, his casino key license was renewed. "Leung's lawyer, Guy Michael said, that the criminal allegations were "absolutely untrue. In August 2013, Leung requested to be placed on the Casino Key Employee Inactive List in August 2013 "in lieu of complying with the resubmission process".

=== Shooting incidents ===
On May 27, 2009, Ray Kot, a casino supervisor for the former Taj Mahal, was shot and killed while working, by Mark Magee of Norristown, Pennsylvania. Magee claimed that he killed Kot because all "casinos cheat gamblers." On August 11, 2010, Magee was sentenced to 30 years without parole, "The Ray Kot Memorial Park" was dedicated on October 16, 2009.

On September 18, 2011, a man was shot dead and a woman was wounded during an apparent carjacking inside the parking garage of the casino. The man, 28-year-old Sunil Rattu, and the woman, 24-year-old Radha Ghetia, were held up as they left the casino, and then forced to drive to a nearby alley where Rattu was shot dead, while Ghetia was shot in the upper part of her body. Ghetia was treated for her injuries and later recovered. Just days later, three Camden men were taken into custody; two of whom admitted to the crime and took plea bargains with the county attorneys office, one sentence of 40 and the other one for 47 years.

On March 24, 2016, three teenagers attending a party in a hotel room on the forty-seventh floor were shot. Seven suspects were arrested in connection with the incident, which was later described as "gang related".

== Gallery ==
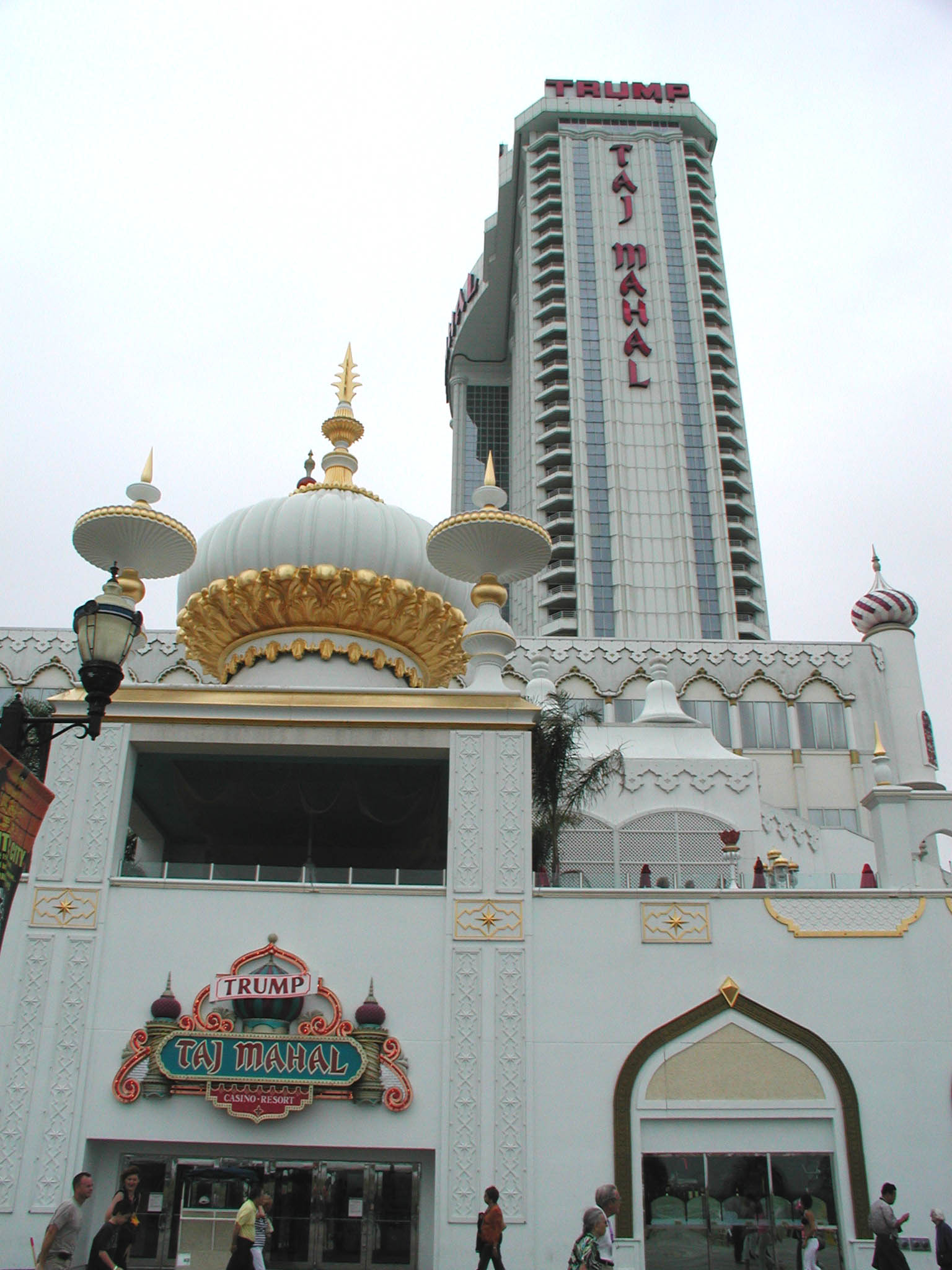
The Trump Taj Mahal, as seen from the Boardwalk (August 2004)

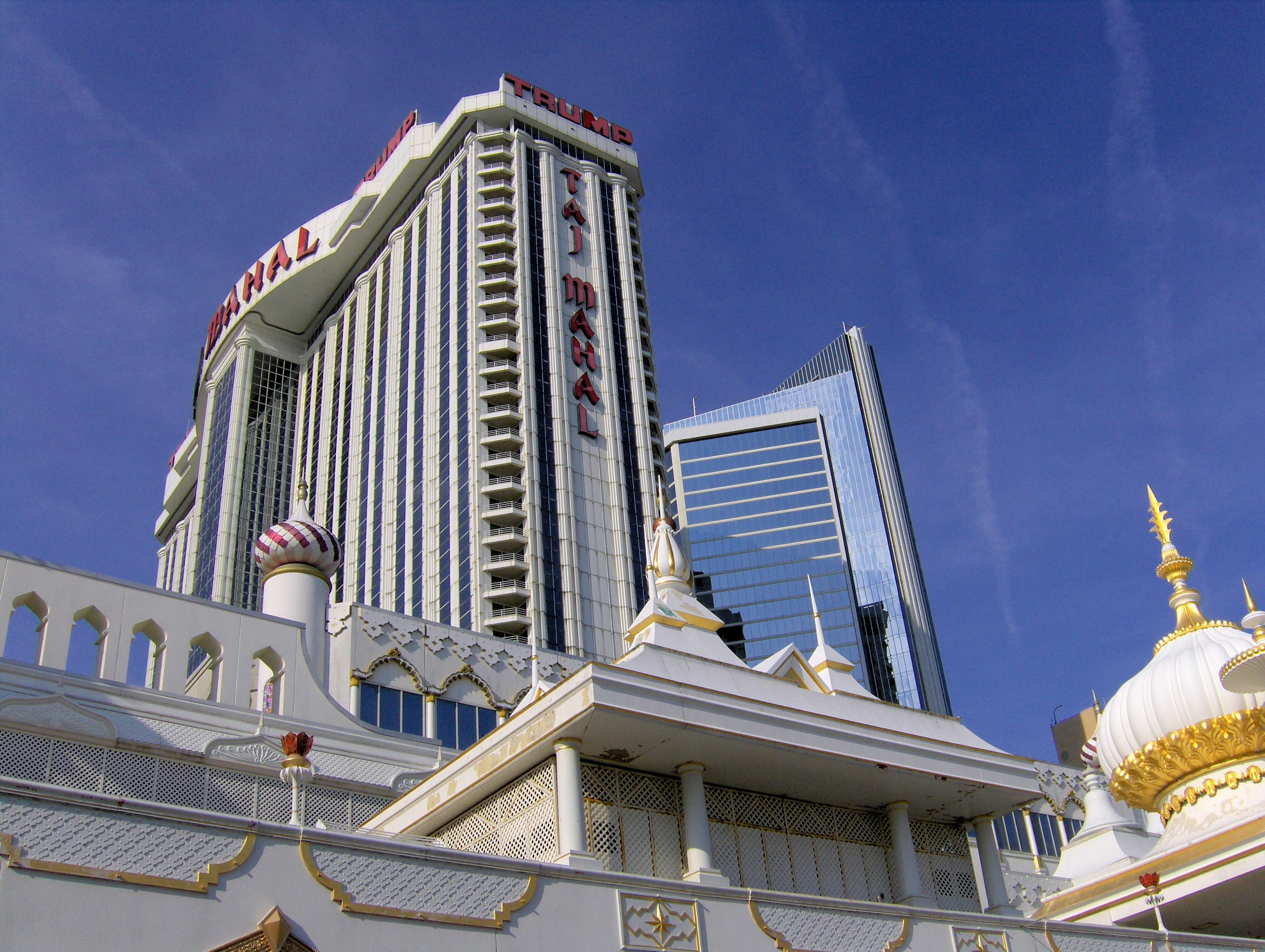
Chairman Tower (February 2009)

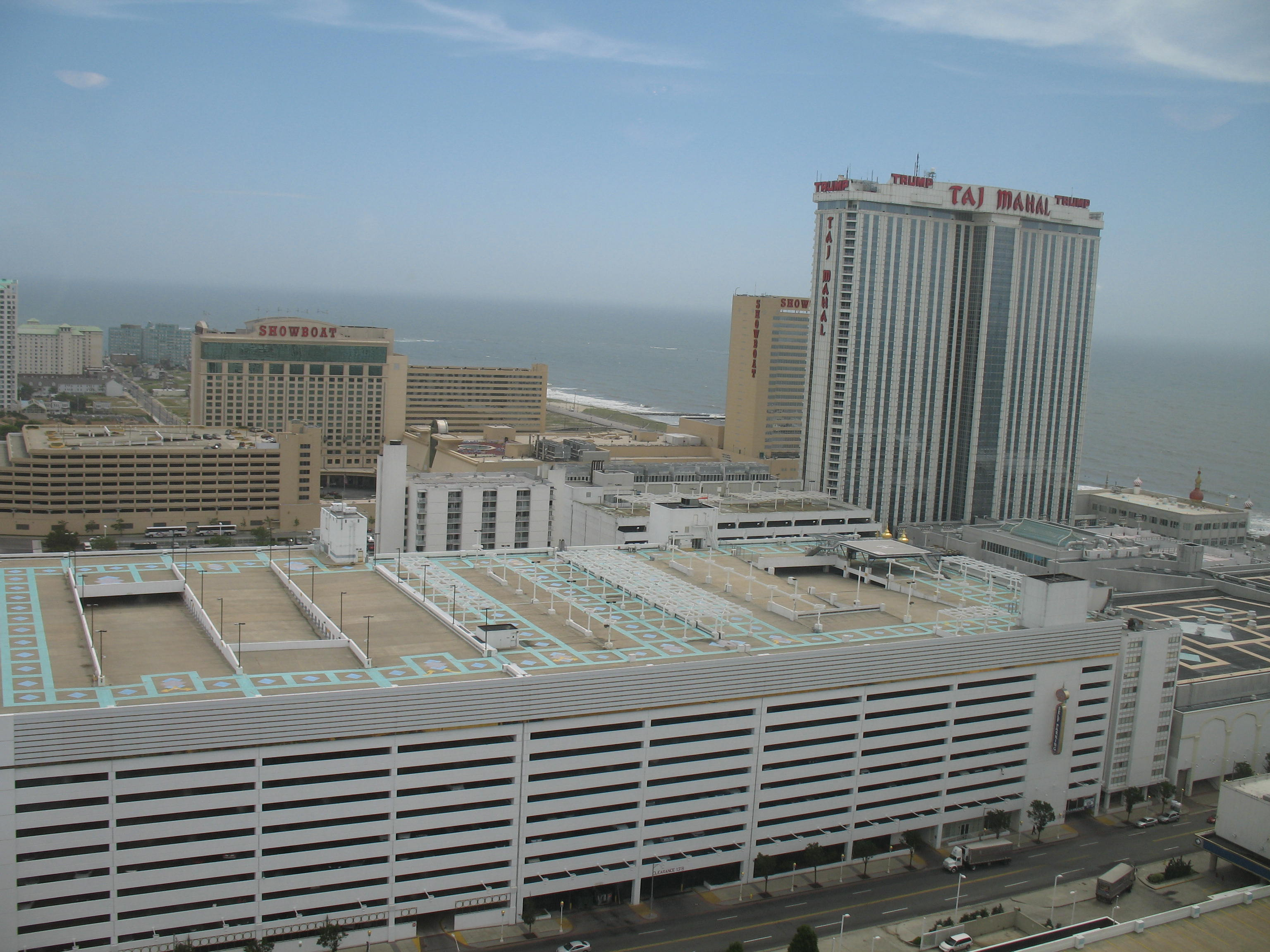
The Taj Mahal, as seen from the Fairfield Resorts (June 2006)

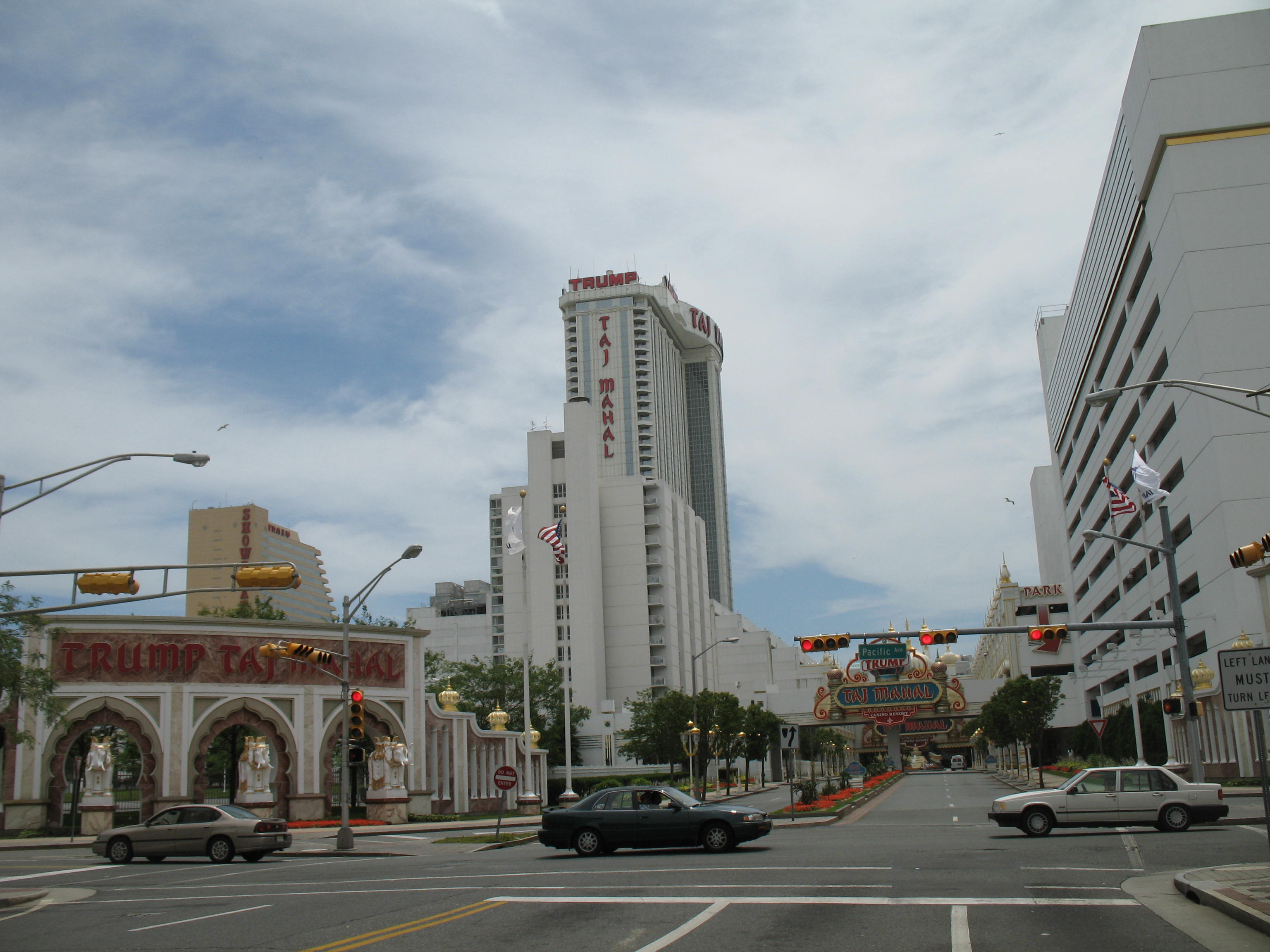
The Trump Taj Mahal, as seen from just beyond Pacific Avenue in June 2006

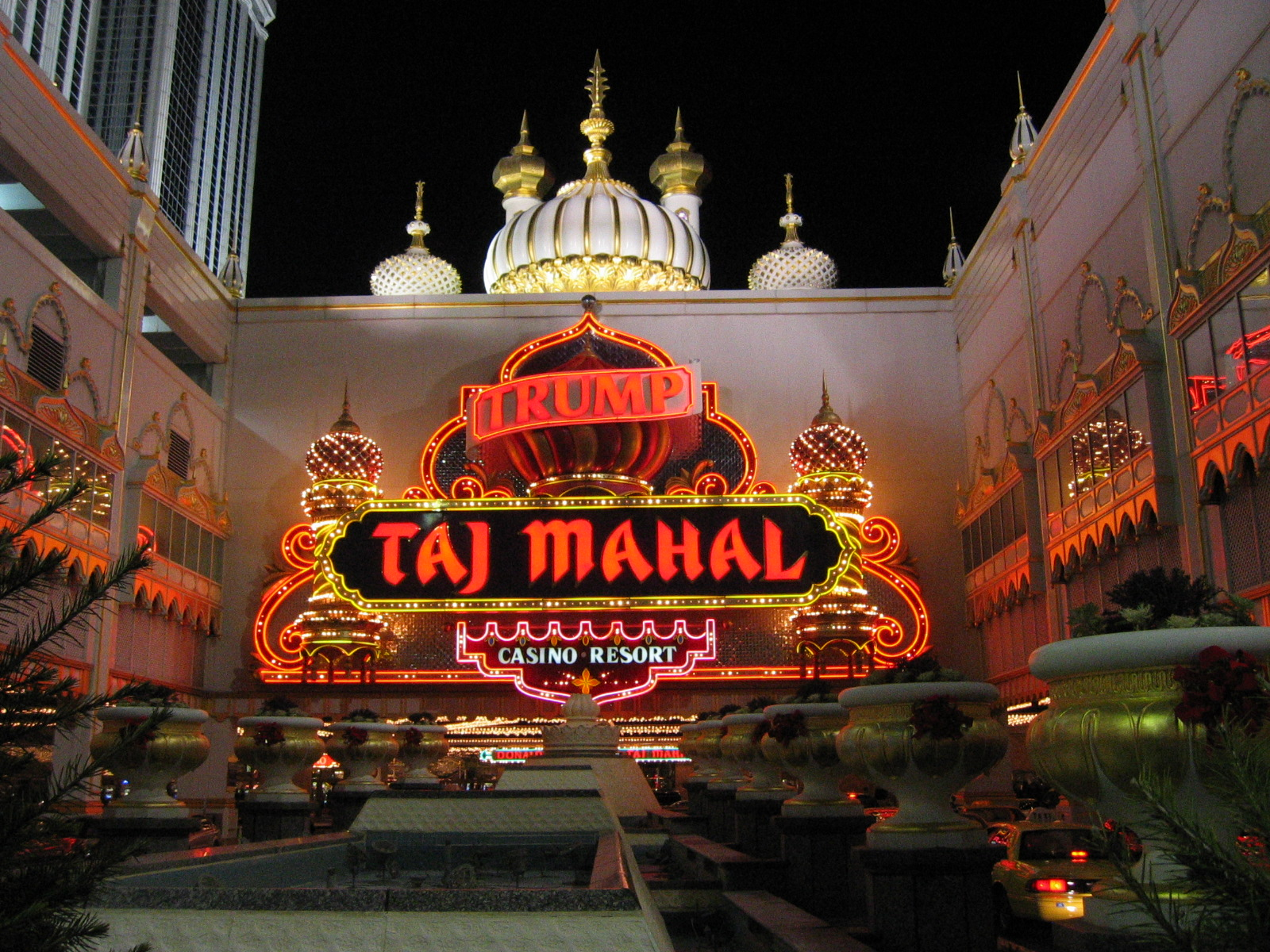
Entrance to the Trump Taj Mahal at night (December 2003)

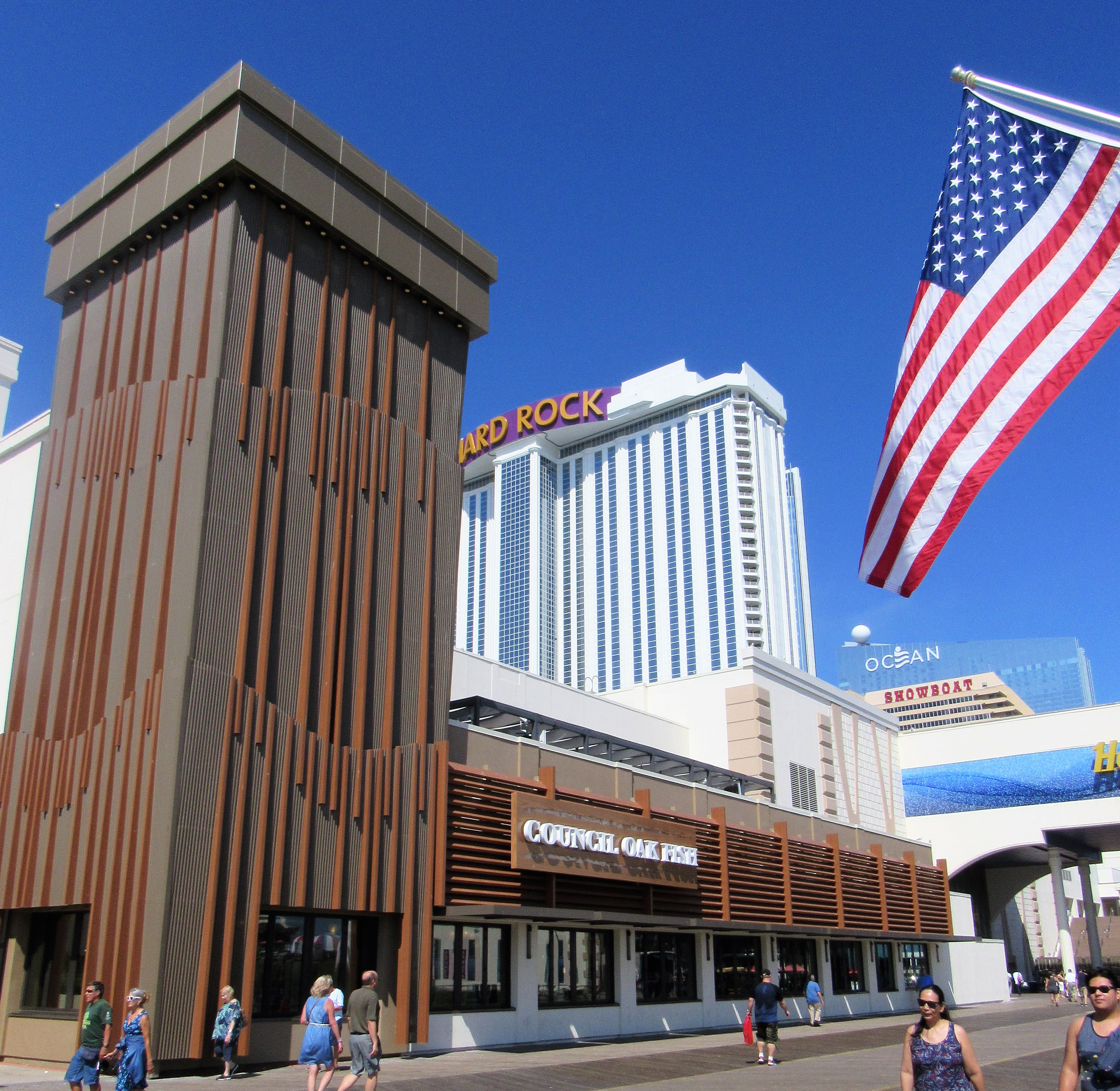
Council Oaks Steaks & Seafood from the Boardwalk (September 2018)

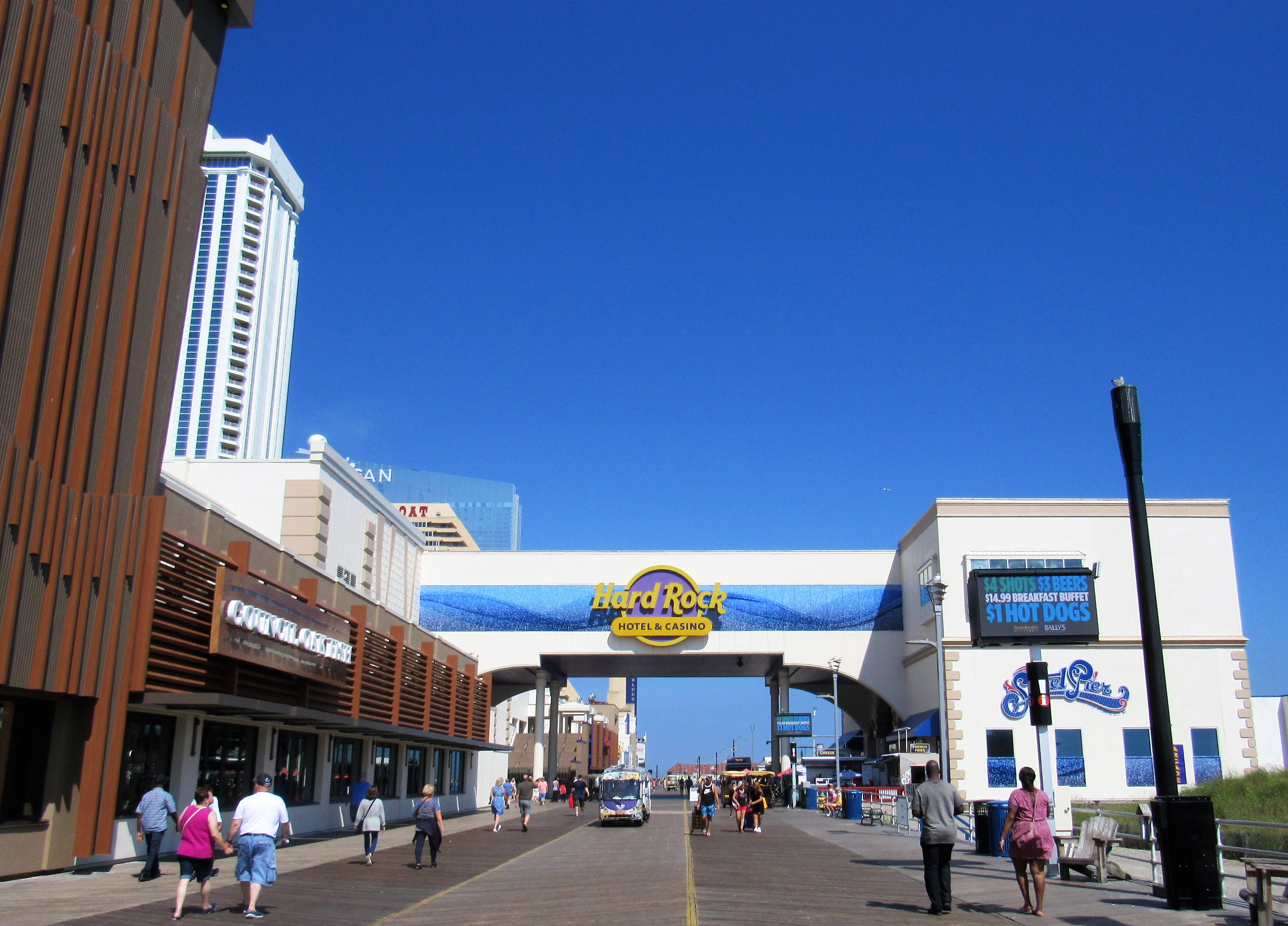
Hard Rock Hotel & Casino from the Boardwalk (September 2018)

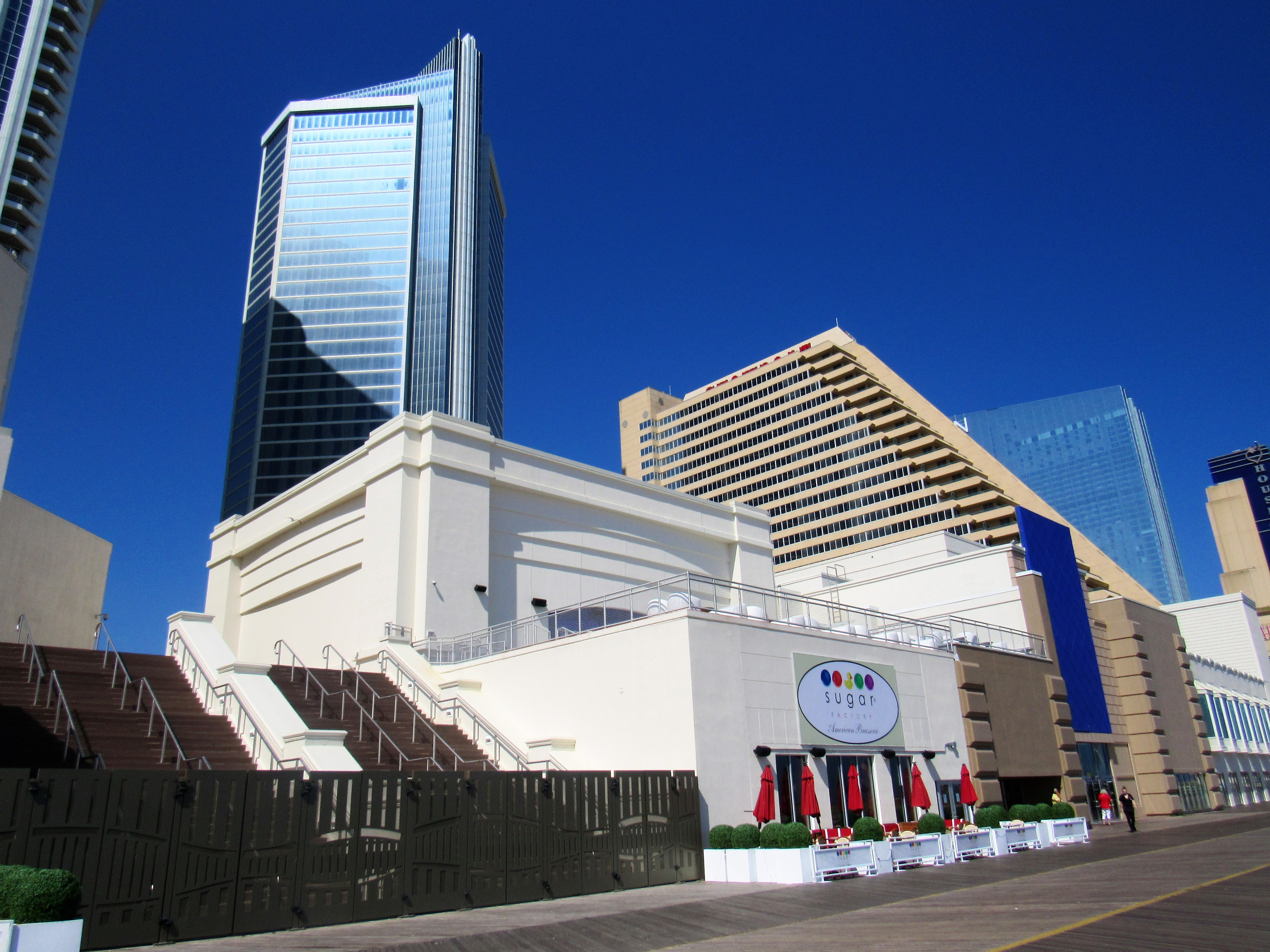
The North Tower from the Boardwalk (September 2018)

== See also ==
- Gambling in New Jersey
- List of tallest buildings in Atlantic City
- The Orange Loop
- List of integrated resorts
- Seminole Hard Rock Hotel & Casino Hollywood

Preceded by Bally's Atlantic City	Tallest Building in Atlantic City; 1990–2002; 429 ft	Succeeded by The Borgata
Preceded by The Water Club	Tallest Building in Atlantic City; 2008; 470 ft	Succeeded by Harrah's Waterfront Tower

Events and tenants
Preceded by Lakefront Arena; Differ Ariake	Ultimate Fighting Championship venue UFC 28; UFC 30, UFC 31	Succeeded by Differ Ariake; Continental Airlines Arena
