= Jersey Pride =

LGBTQ pride event

- Genre: Pride parade and festival
- Date: First Sunday in June
- Location: Asbury Park, New Jersey
- Inaugurated: 1991
- Organizer: Jersey Pride, Inc.

Jersey Pride is the state of New Jersey's annual gay pride parade, festival and rally. It is held on the first Sunday in the month of June in Asbury Park, New Jersey. It is the largest and oldest pride celebration in the state. (Note: "Oldest" and "largest" are claims attributed to multiple news outlets.)

== History and origins ==
The Jersey Pride parade originated in Asbury Park, where local businesses such as the Talking Bird Café and Sands Hotel played a role in fostering a sense of community for the gay population. The café and hotel, managed by Ed Schau and his partner of 60 years, Carmen DiFilippantonio, were known as spaces where people of various ages and backgrounds could gather.

In 1991, the city hosted its first pride parade, a short procession that passed by the Talking Bird Café and Sands Hotel. The event was a small tribute to the local LGBTQ+ community. With the return of the parade in 1992, Asbury Park became the site of the Jersey Pride Parade.

== Event ==
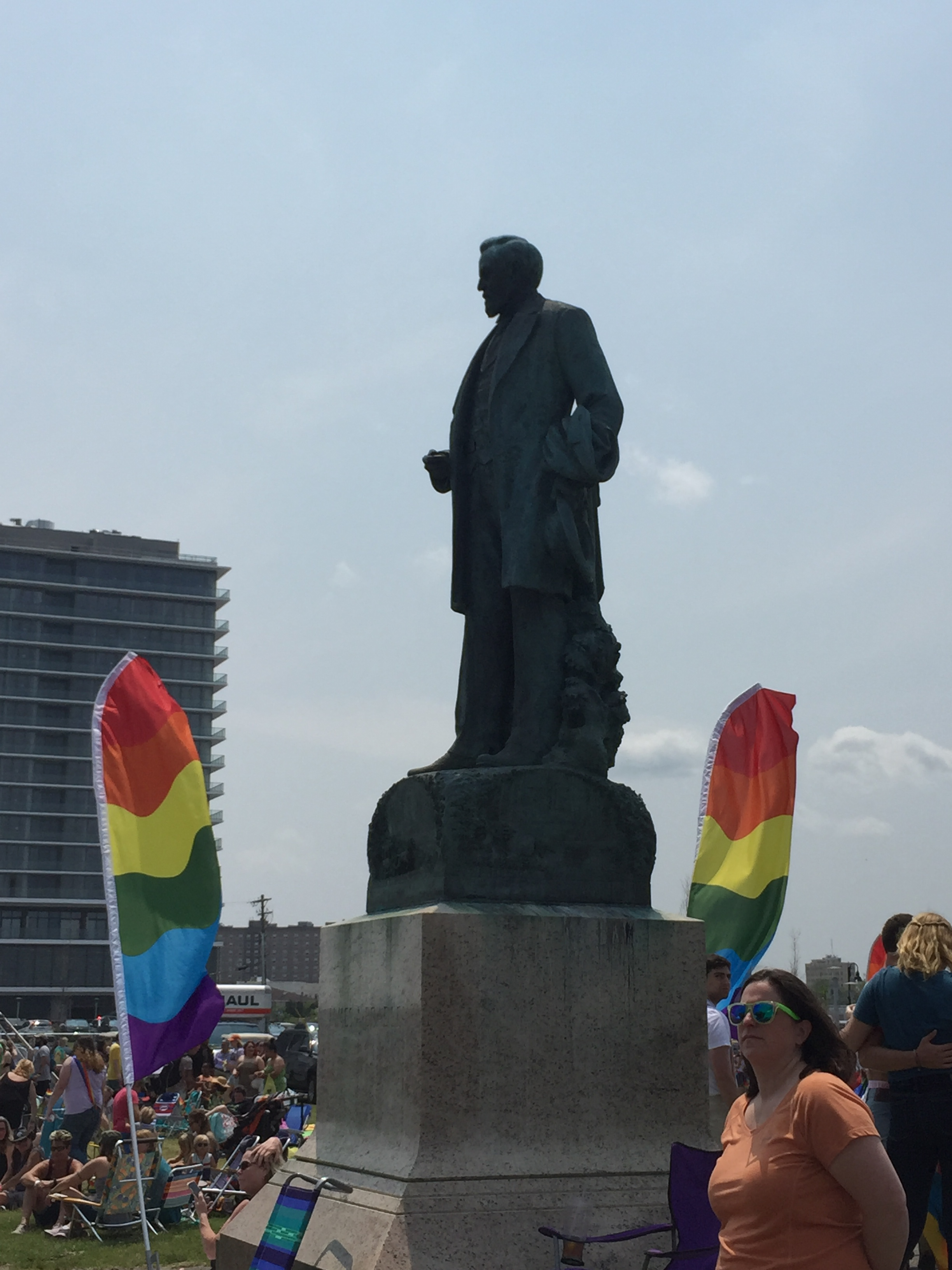
Bradley Park during Jersey Pride in 2019.

The Jersey Pride parade is always held on the first Sunday in June and typically takes a route spanning approximately 1.25 miles (2.01 km). The parade begins at Asbury Park City Hall and proceeds south on Main Street. It turns left onto Cookman Avenue, left again onto Grand Avenue, and continues north on Grand to Sunset Avenue, where it ends at the festival grounds.

After the parade, the Jersey Pride Festival takes place on gated festival grounds between Sunset Lake and Convention Hall in Asbury Park, in Atlantic Square Park and Bradley Park (bordered by Ocean Ave to the east, Fifth Ave to the south, Webb St to the west and Sunset Ave to the north.

The festival is a ticketed eventand typically features live music and performances, with local and national LGBTQ+ musicians, drag performers, and other entertainers. Food and drink vendors, LGBTQ+ advocacy groups, and merchants are present. The event is designed to be family-friendly, with activities for children, such as face painting and crafts.

== See also ==
- History of the LGBT community in Asbury Park
- Garden State Equality
- Paradise (nightclub)
- The Empress Hotel (New Jersey)
- Georgies
- Gay community of Plainfield, New Jersey
- LGBT history in Atlantic City
