= Paradise (nightclub) =

Gay nightclub in Asbury Park, New Jersey

- Logo

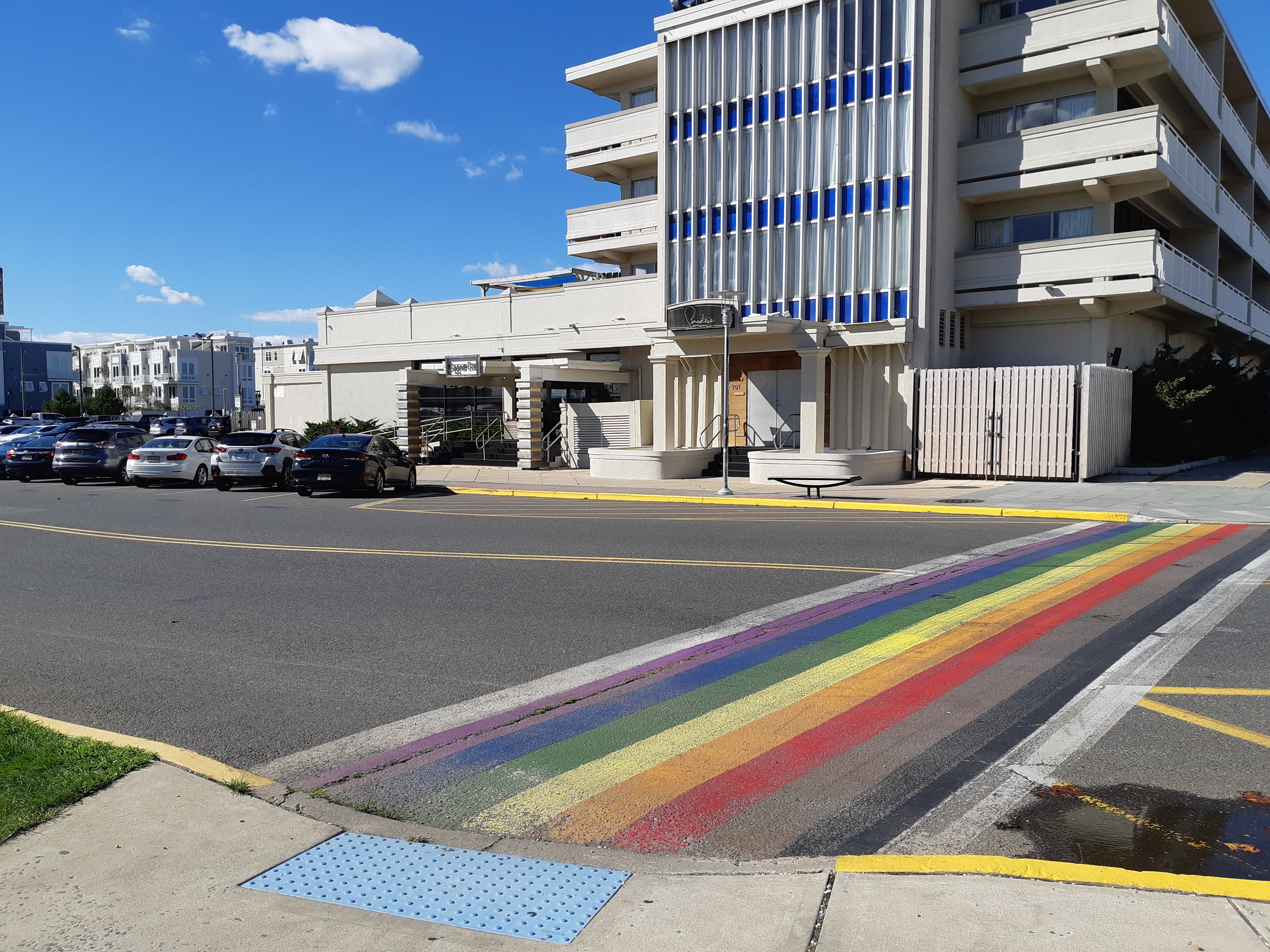
- The entrance to Paradise on the side of the Empress Hotel

- Location within Monmouth County, New Jersey
- Address: 101 Asbury Avenue
- Location: Asbury Park, New Jersey, US
- Coordinates: 40.2184°N 74.0015°W
- Owner: Shep Pettibone
- Type: Gay bar; nightclub
- Public transit: Asbury Park station

Construction
- Opened: May 1999

Website
- paradisenj.com

Paradise is a gay nightclub in Asbury Park, New Jersey. It is known for its fundraisers and drag shows, most notable of which is the annual Miss Paradise pageant. The club is integrated with the Empress Hotel; both are owned by record producer Shep Pettibone. Paradise's 1999 opening is credited as one factor that improved Asbury Park's struggling economy and drew the LGBTQ community back to the city after a period of local unrest. The venue is a popular Jersey Shore destination in the summer, and it has received praise for its welcoming atmosphere.

== Description ==
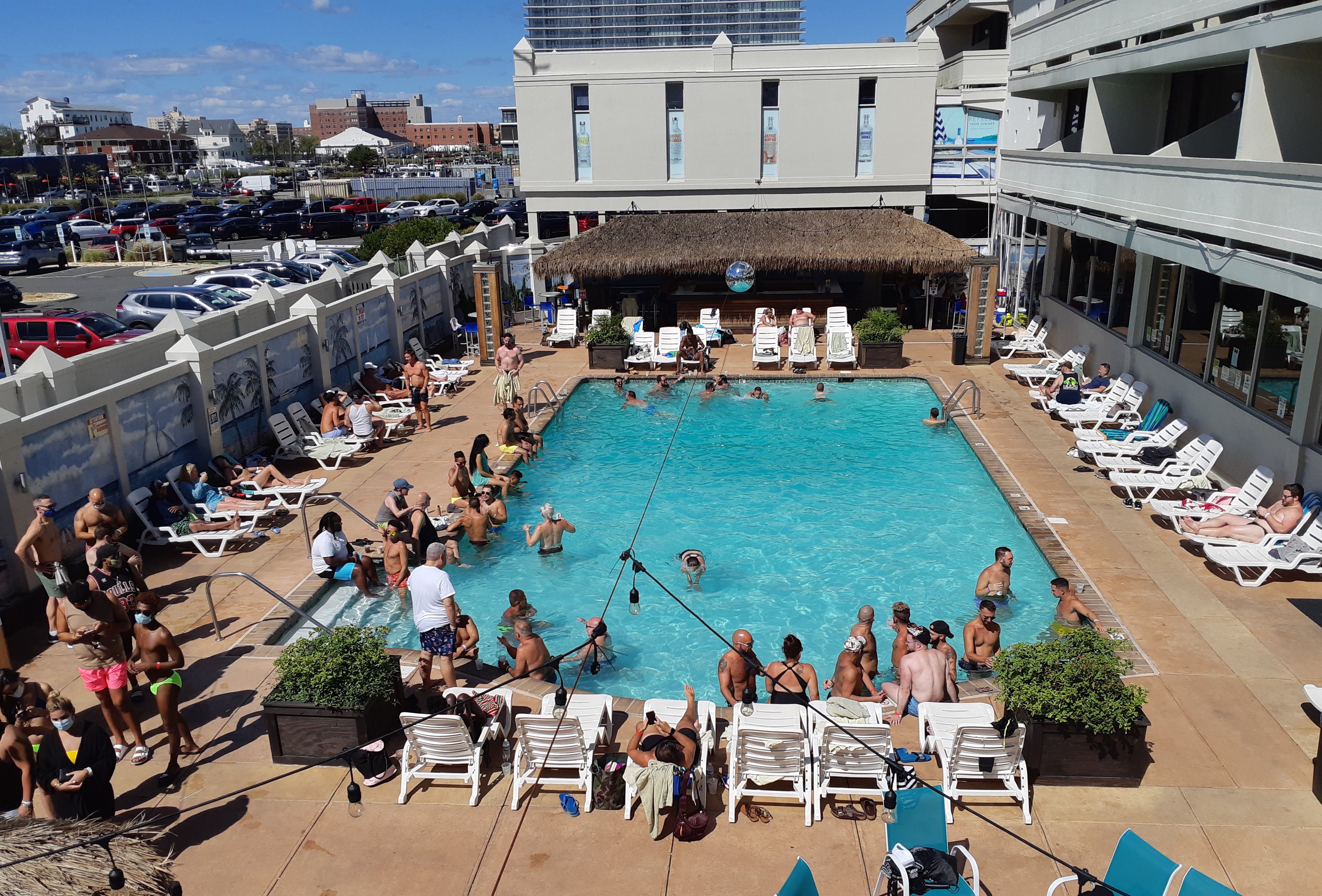
The swimming pool at Paradise in August 2020

Paradise is located adjacent to the boardwalk in Asbury Park, New Jersey. The street outside the venue is adorned with a rainbow crosswalk. Managed by Joseph "JoJo" Crisci, the club is attached to the Empress Hotel and features a heated outdoor swimming pool. Inside, it is split into two principal spaces: the main room and the Copper Bar. Lisa Rose of NJ.com wrote that "[a]lthough the club is geared toward the gay community, the crowd is eclectic, not limited by sexual orientation or age". Most of its clientele are in their early 20s to late 50s. Paradise is known for its dance music, comedy events and fundraisers. It runs a number of weekly drag shows, including "Bitchy Bingo" and tea dances.

=== Miss Paradise pageant ===
The club is also home to Miss Paradise, an annual drag pageant whose winner is awarded a yearlong in-house show. The competition was founded in 2000, and the first performer to take the crown was Lady Marisa. Miss Paradise 2018, Honey Davenport, later appeared on the 11th season of RuPaul's Drag Race. Sapphira Cristál, who competed in the 2019 pageant, won the national title of Miss'd America later that year and subsequently appeared on RuPaul's Drag Race season 16. The 2020 contest, held just before the onset of the COVID-19 pandemic in New Jersey, featured two celebrity judges: Margaret Josephs (of The Real Housewives of New Jersey) and her mother, Marge Sr. There, Miss Paradise 2019, Mancie Mandell, was succeeded by Olivia Lux, who was then cast on the 13th season of Drag Race. Mandell's drag daughter, Drag Race season 14 contestant Jasmine Kennedie, performed regularly at Paradise prior to appearing on the show.

== History ==
=== Background and early years ===
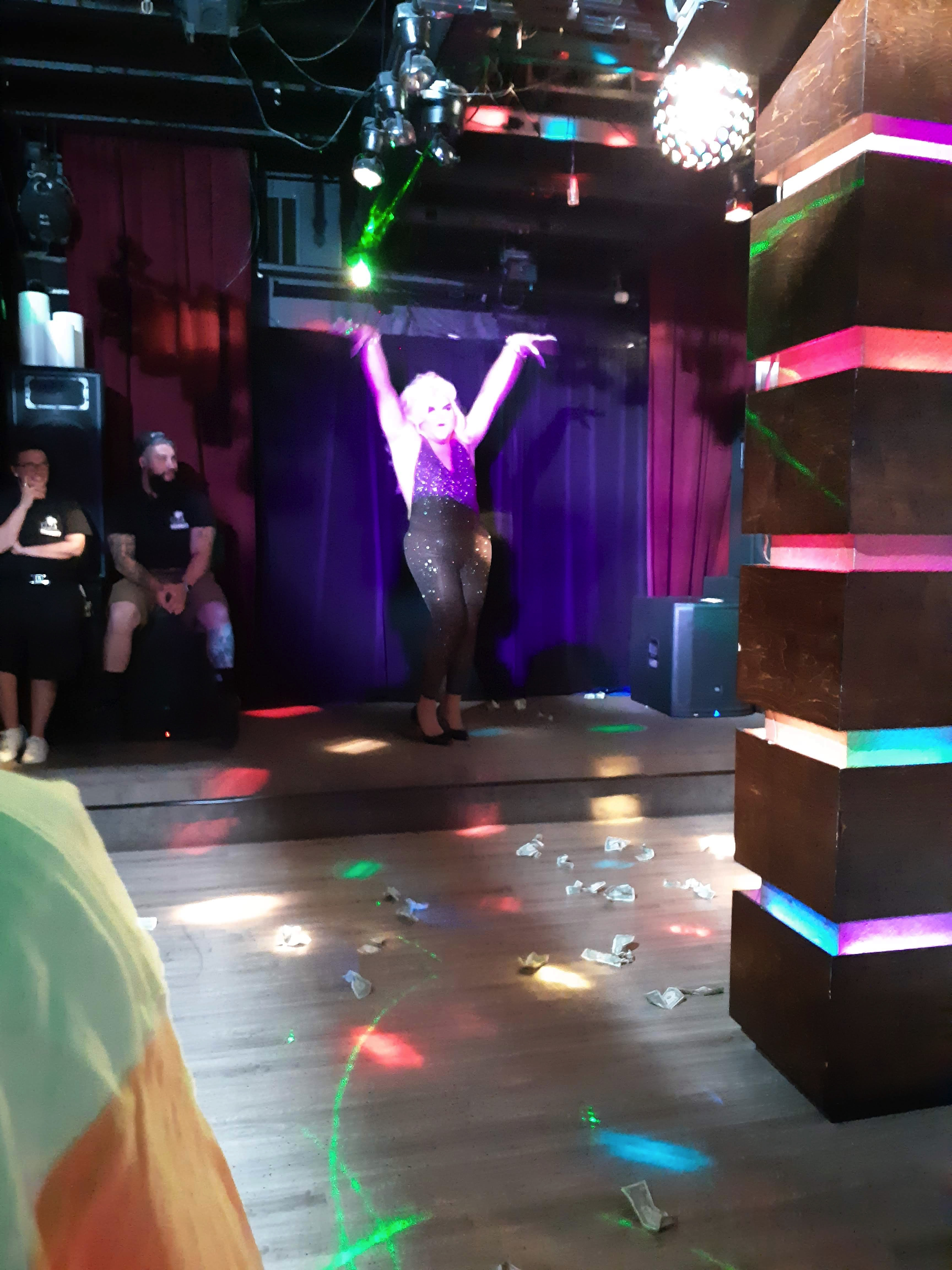
Drag show in Paradise's Copper Bar

Asbury Park was a popular destination for LGBTQ travelers at least as early as the 1930s, when it had a number of underground gay and lesbian bars. Conditions in the city deteriorated after a series of race riots in 1970 and the subsequent onset of the AIDS epidemic, which ravaged the local gay community. Circumstances began to improve in 1991, when New Jersey passed a law barring discrimination on the basis of sexual orientation. The state's first Pride celebration was held in Asbury Park the following year, and the town soon saw a boom in LGBT-owned businesses.

In 1998, record producer Shep Pettibone purchased the Empress Hotel and its adjoining nightclub, at which time the facilities had been non-operational for more than a decade. Initially, the move was only meant to be a financial investment, but Pettibone decided to target his business toward the LGBT customer base in hopes that this would attract that community back to Asbury Park. He renovated both properties but focused on the club first; renamed Paradise, it opened in May 1999. The hotel followed in 2004 or 2005. According to NJ.com, Paradise is one of the oldest continuously operated gay clubs in New Jersey and has played a role in "the revitalization of Asbury Park". The town and its businesses, including well-known locales like The Stone Pony, were still struggling when Paradise opened, and the return of the club and hotel helped boost the local economy. It also contributed to the renewal of Asbury Park's popularity as an LGBT destination on the Jersey Shore.

=== 2010s to present ===
Hurricane Sandy blew the roof off of the Empress in 2012, and during the building's repair process, Pettibone gave Paradise a number of upgrades, including a new dance floor, video displays and laser lights. In the wake of the 2016 Pulse nightclub shooting in Orlando, Paradise and other Asbury Park nightlife venues implemented new security measures, and local law enforcement increased its presence around all queer establishments in the area. In 2017, Paradise was the host venue of the Mr. and Miss Gay United States pageant. Like other bars, clubs and restaurants, Paradise was ordered to close at the start of the COVID-19 pandemic in New Jersey. Traditionally a prime location for Pride festivities, it instead held a virtual celebration in June 2020. Paradise was able to reopen its tiki bar and pool area for outdoor service in the summer.

== Reception ==
In its 2018 article "All 47 bars in Asbury Park, ranked worst to best", NJ.com listed Paradise in 21st place and called it "the most popular gay club at the Jersey Shore". The venue has received praise for "the 'family-like' feeling one gets inside" and for "the transformative work it has done for the LGBT community over the past two decades". Michael Cook of Hornet.com said: "Poolside cocktails, tea dances and top DJs make Paradise the go-to spot for spending those lazy (and not-so-lazy) days of summer." In an Instinct article, Cook wrote that the club was "a trailblazer in the community". A FunNewJersey.com assessment placed the club among the "Best Gay Bars in NJ", remarked that it offers "the very best in entertainment", and concluded: "Whether you're looking to spend your night on the dance floor, have a great meal, a great time with friends, or you're looking to enjoy an intimate time in the chill Martini Lounge for specialty cocktails, Paradise offers it all."

== See also ==
- LGBTQ+ community in Asbury Park
