= LGBTQ history in Atlantic City, New Jersey =

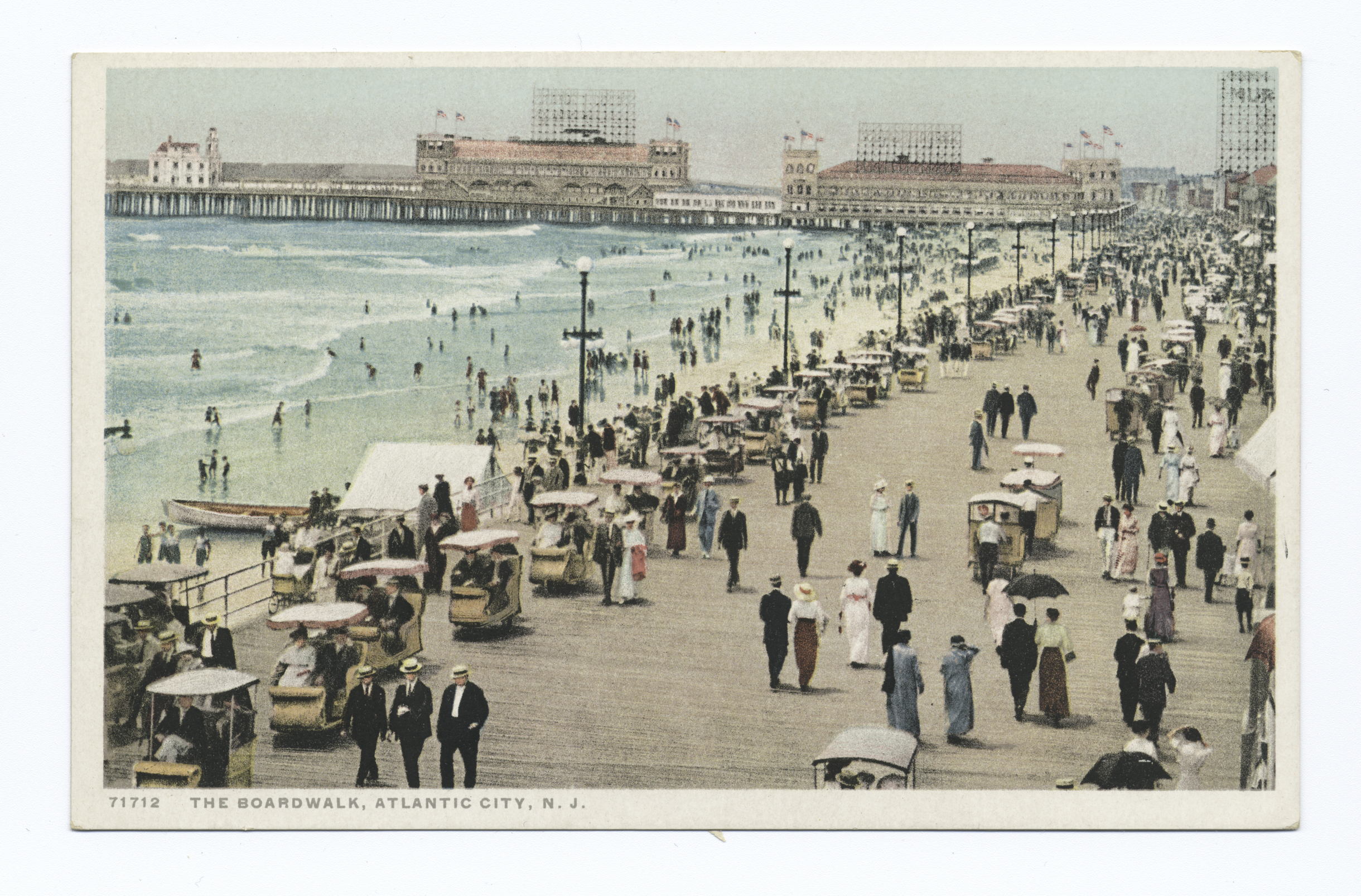
Vintage photograph of the Atlantic City boardwalk

Atlantic City, New Jersey has a long association with the LGBT community, particular in the areas of nightlife and drag performance.

== Background ==
"From its earliest days" in the late 19th century, "Atlantic City's climate of relative sexual freedom attracted gay white tourists to town." Former Ziegfeld girl Louise Mack opened the Entertainers Club in the 1920s, which has been described as the oldest gay bar on the East Coast. Drag shows were something of a craze in the city during the early 1930s. Some consider the massive influx of military recruits to the city during the war at the Atlantic City Training Center to have jumpstarted the gay nightlife in the city.

Young servicemen and women, newly freed from the constraints of narrow-minded small towns and seeking same-sex companionship, were eager to explore places like the Entertainers Club. New York Avenue establishments with drag shows became popular. Gay and lesbian-friendly guesthouses opened in the city.

In 1942, as the military occupied many of the city's hotels, it became something of a "militarized resort." A crackdown on vice activities ensued, with particular focus on female impersonators. This led to a ban on "female impersonators" in local entertainment venues during that period. The Atlantic City police chief declared, "Female impersonators as entertainers are no longer allowed to appear in local entertainment venues."

At midcentury, police regularly arrested cross-dressers and drag queens. Numerous Atlantic City nightlife venues were fined or otherwise persecuted for hosting guests who "appeared" to be homosexual and "female impersonators" by the state alcohol enforcement authority at mid-century.

== Rainbow Beach ==
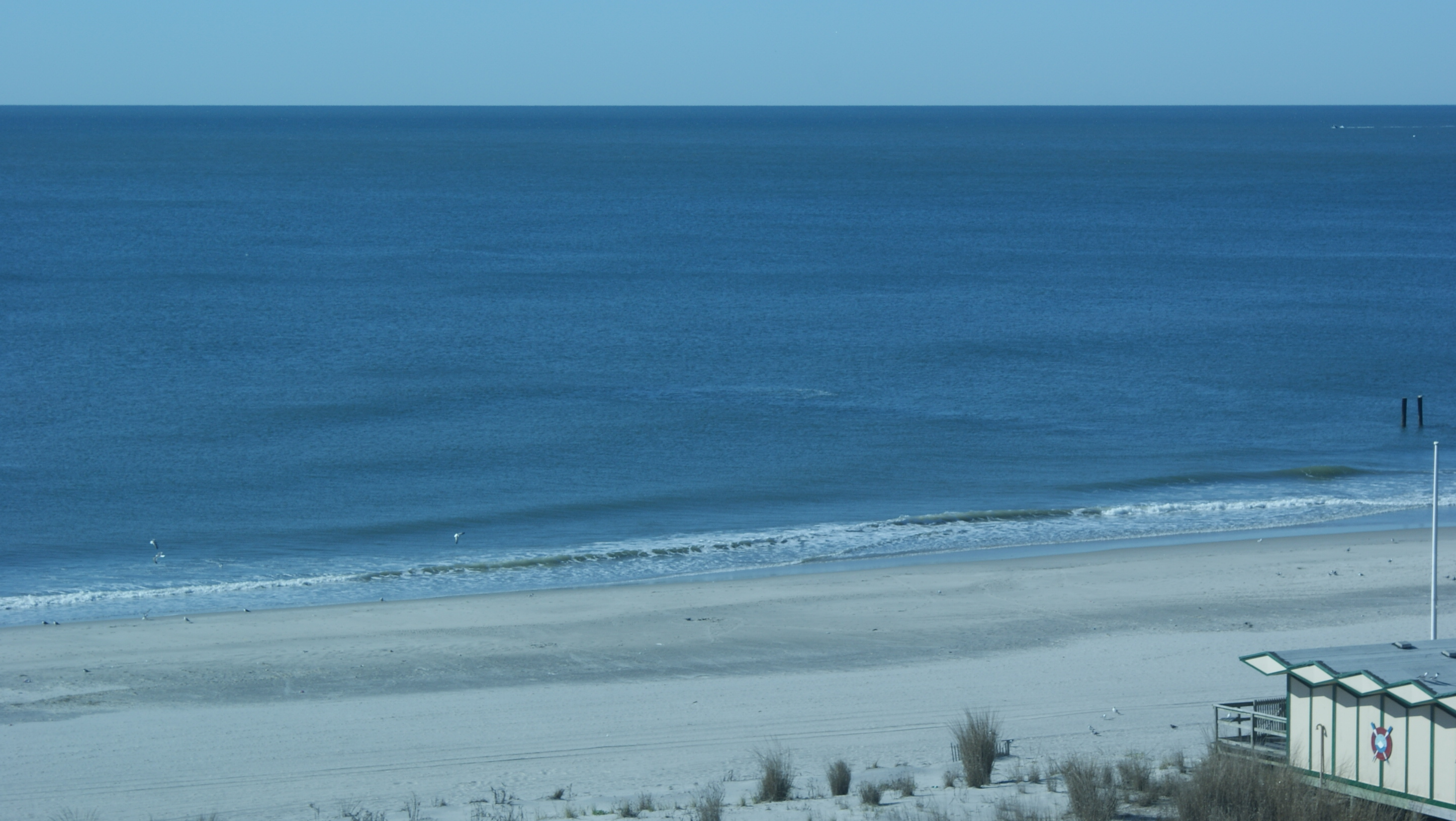
Atlantic City's beach

The beach in front of the Claridge Hotel in Atlantic City has been known as a "gay beach" for decades, some say chosen due to the phallic shape of the peak at the top of the hotel against the skyline. In 2022, Park Place Beach in front of the Claridge was officially rededicated with a painted entry as Rainbow Beach.

== New York Avenue and Snake Alley ==
Atlantic City's New York Avenue and what is now Schultz-Hill Boulevard was once known as a bustling mid-century and late 20th-century gay neighborhood and nightlife district. Gay venues like the Saratoga Club (now the site of Cardinal at 201 S. New York Ave), the Chez (now the site of Anchor Rock Club), the Rendezvous, the underground club Pukalani and the Chester Inn contributed to the culture and nightlife of the area, and a variety of breakfast spots, cafés and restaurants were frequented by the gay community.

The area peaked with a large number of gay establishments in the 1970s, in the era between the legalization of serving "apparent homosexuals" in New Jersey drinking establishments by the New Jersey Supreme Court in the One Eleven Wines case (brought by, among others, the owners of AC gay bar Val's) and the beginning of the casino era in 1978.

White middle-class tourism to the city had drastically declined between 1950 and 1970, allowing the gay community to flourish without harassment over tourism concerns. “The eleven years between the One Eleven Wines ruling and the arrival of casino gambling in 1978 represent what can only be described as Atlantic City’s Golden Age — queer edition.” During this period, “New York Avenue and the surrounding streets held over 30 gay bars and clubs, a dozen restaurants, six or more hotels, and clothing stores catering to LGBTQ+ visitors.”

By the mid-to-early 1980s, however, the presence of the casinos, which tended to disincentivize a walkable city environment, had caused the teardown of many of the old establishments on New York Avenue. Land speculation in the hopes of casino buy-outs of parcels led to disinvestment in independent and small-scale rooming houses, restaurants and gay nightlife venues walkable to the beach. Many of the staff and performers on the gay scene moved to the better-paying casinos. The AIDS epidemic additionally decimated the community in the 1980s and early 1990s, and independent bars, clubs and rooming houses could not compete with the comped freebies at the casinos.

== Schultz-Hill Boulevard ==
Schultz-Hill Boulevard was formerly known as Snake Alley or Westminster Alley but was renamed in 2023 to honor former nightclub owner John Schultz and Gary Hill, the couple who established the Schultz-Hill Foundation for South Jersey performing and visual arts and other community services.

The Miss'd America is an annual drag pageant held in the city, founded by the couple in the early 1990s as a satirical spoof of the Miss America competition.

== Present day ==
In 2025, ByrdCage, the city's first full-service queer restaurant and bar in over twenty years, opened in the city. The Pride Center of Atlantic City is slated to open in 2026 on Kentucky Avenue, which will bring South Jersey its first LGBTQ+ community center.

== See also ==
- The Orange Loop
- Miss'd America
- LGBT history in Asbury Park, New Jersey
- Jersey Pride
