= The Orange Loop =

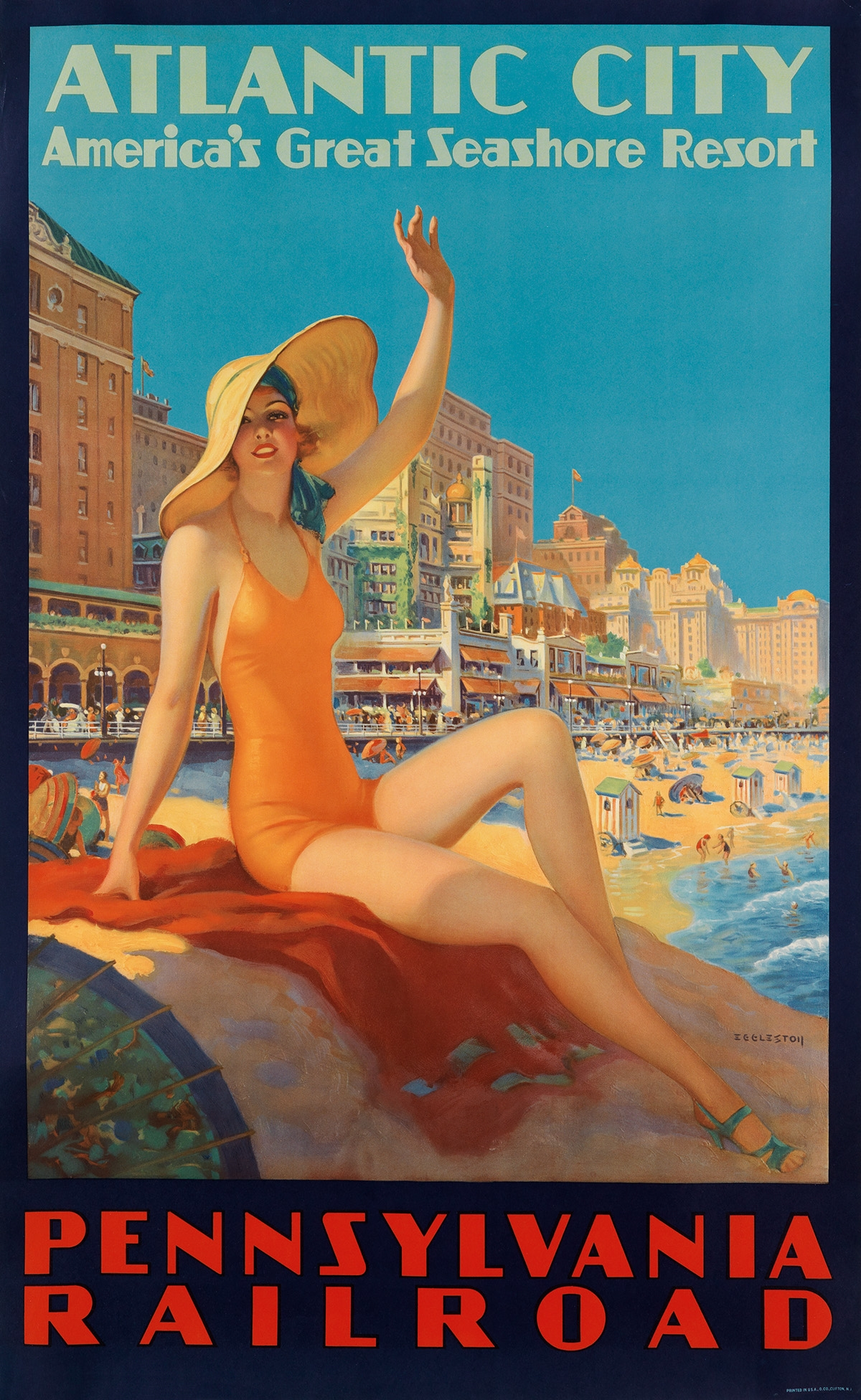
1935 promotional poster by Edward M. Eggleston

The Orange Loop is a neighborhood near the beach in downtown Atlantic City with a focus on restaurants such as Cardinal, bars, coffee such as Hayday, public art, and live music establishments such as indie rock venue Anchor Rock Club and Tennessee Avenue Beer Hall.

== Location ==
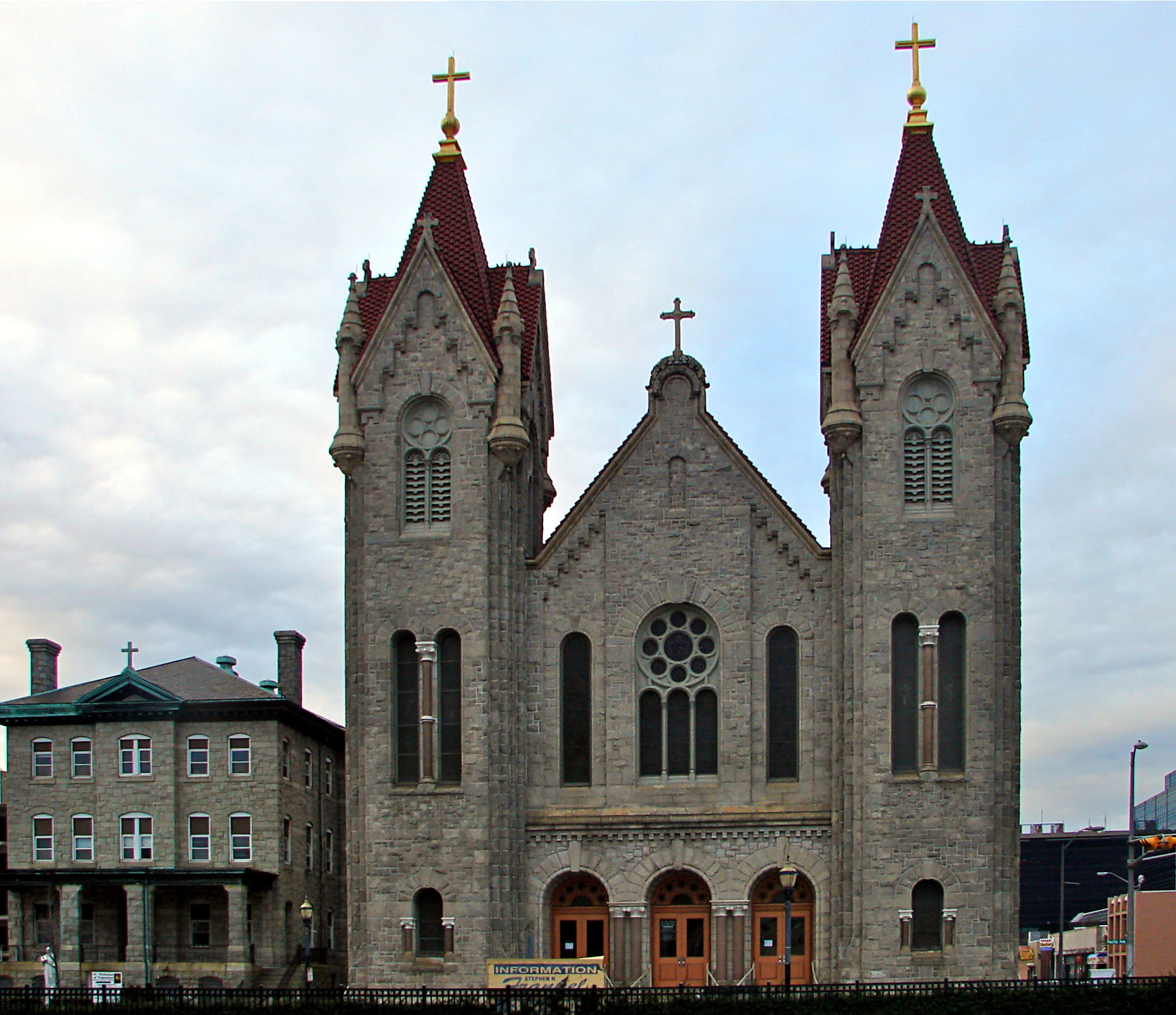
St. Nicholas of Tolentine Church on the Orange Loop.

The loop runs perpendicular from the boardwalk inland roughly to St. Nicholas of Tolentine Church, and includes the three beach blocks of New York Avenue, St. James Place, and Tennessee Avenue. It is bounded by Tennessee Avenue, New York Avenue, Pacific Avenue and the boardwalk (with St. James Place running down the center) and derives its name from the orange color of those three beach blocks on a traditional Monopoly gameboard.

== History ==
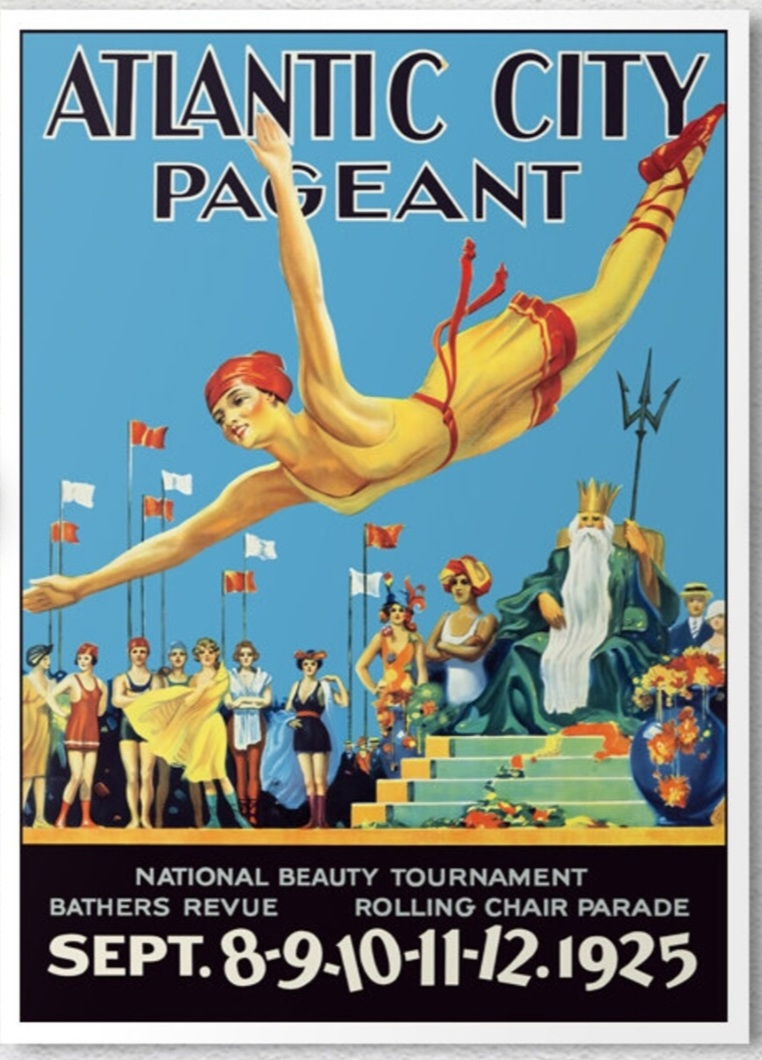
1925 pageant poster, Atlantic City

Historically, Tennessee Avenue was a shopping and dining district in the city, prior to urban blight. The vicinity of New York Avenue on the loop and what was then Snake Alley (now Schultz-Hill Boulevard) one block over was once known as a bustling 1970s-era gay neighborhood and nightlife district. Venues like the Saratoga Club (now the site of Cardinal at 201 S. New York Ave), the Chez, the Rendezvous, the underground club Pukalani and the Chester Inn contributed to the culture and nightlife of the area. In the late 2010s, a number of investors began efforts to revamp properties in the area with the aim of attracting back and growing more walkable dining and nightlife in the neighborhood along with residents and the arts.

== Establishments and events ==
=== Rock ===
The outdoor Orange Loop Amphitheater hosted the Frantic City punk and indie rock music festival on the loop in 2022, emceed by Fred Armisen. The inaugural Orange Loop Rock Festival, with rock acts from the 1980s and 1990s, took place in 2022 at the Showboat Festival Grounds (several blocks east of the actual district). A number of venues on the loop hosted shows during the North to Shore Festival in 2023.

=== AC Container Park ===
A container park is being developed at 1400 Pacific Avenue, using 22 repurposed shipping containers for retail, food vendors, and community spaces. The project, developed by MAP 3 Partners, was nearing completion in 2026. The concept was partly inspired by the Cargo District in Wilmington, North Carolina, which similarly incorporates shipping containers into a mixed-use commercial district.

=== The Top Hat ===
The Top Hat is a planned six-room boutique hotel at 215 South Tennessee Avenue in the Orange Loop. The three-story hotel is designed around the Monopoly top-hat playing piece and will feature a large top-hat structure on its roof, along with a rooftop deck with views toward the Atlantic Ocean. Developed by Mark Callazzo and RMS Capital, the hotel is expected to open in late 2026.

== See also ==
- New Jersey music venues by capacity
- LGBT history in Atlantic City
- Dante Hall Theater
- Noyes Arts Garage
- Nightclubs in Atlantic City
- Stockton University's Atlantic City campus
