= St. Nicholas of Tolentine Church =

Historic church in New Jersey, US

- Saint Nicholas of Tolentine Church
- U.S. National Register of Historic Places
- New Jersey Register of Historic Places
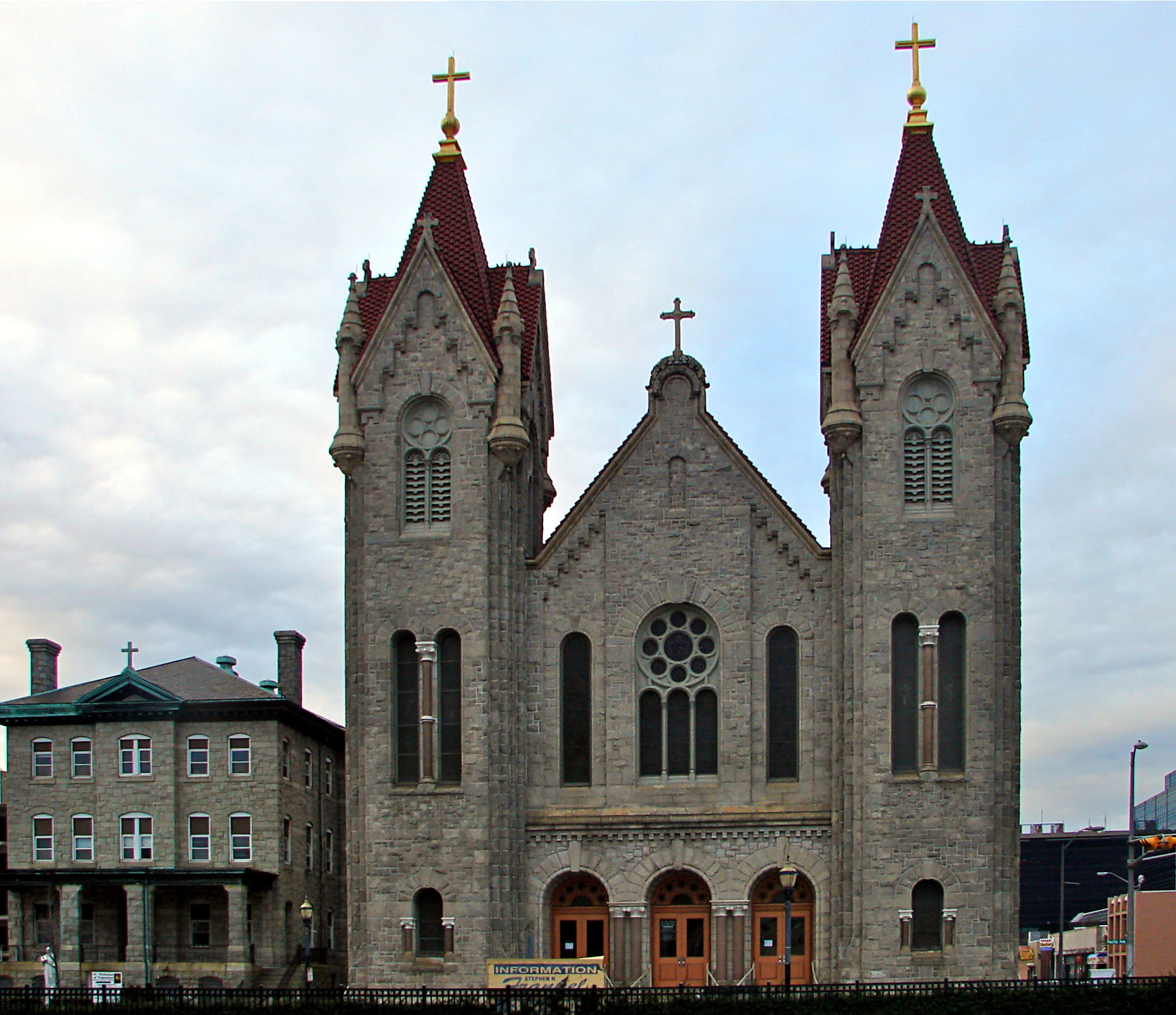

- Location within Atlantic County, New Jersey Location within New Jersey Location within the United States
- Location: 1409 Pacific Avenue, Atlantic City, New Jersey
- Coordinates: 39°21′38″N 74°25′41″W
- Built: 1905
- Architect: Edwin Forrest Durang, John McShain
- Architectural style: Romanesque
- NRHP reference No.: 01000039
- NJRHP No.: 395

Significant dates
- Added to NRHP: February 2, 2001
- Designated NJRHP: December 12, 2000

St. Nicholas of Tolentine Church is a historic Catholic church in Atlantic City, New Jersey, United States. It was built in 1905 and added to the National Register of Historic Places on February 2, 2001, for its significance in architecture. It is one of four churches of the Parish of Saint Monica in the Diocese of Camden.

== Description ==
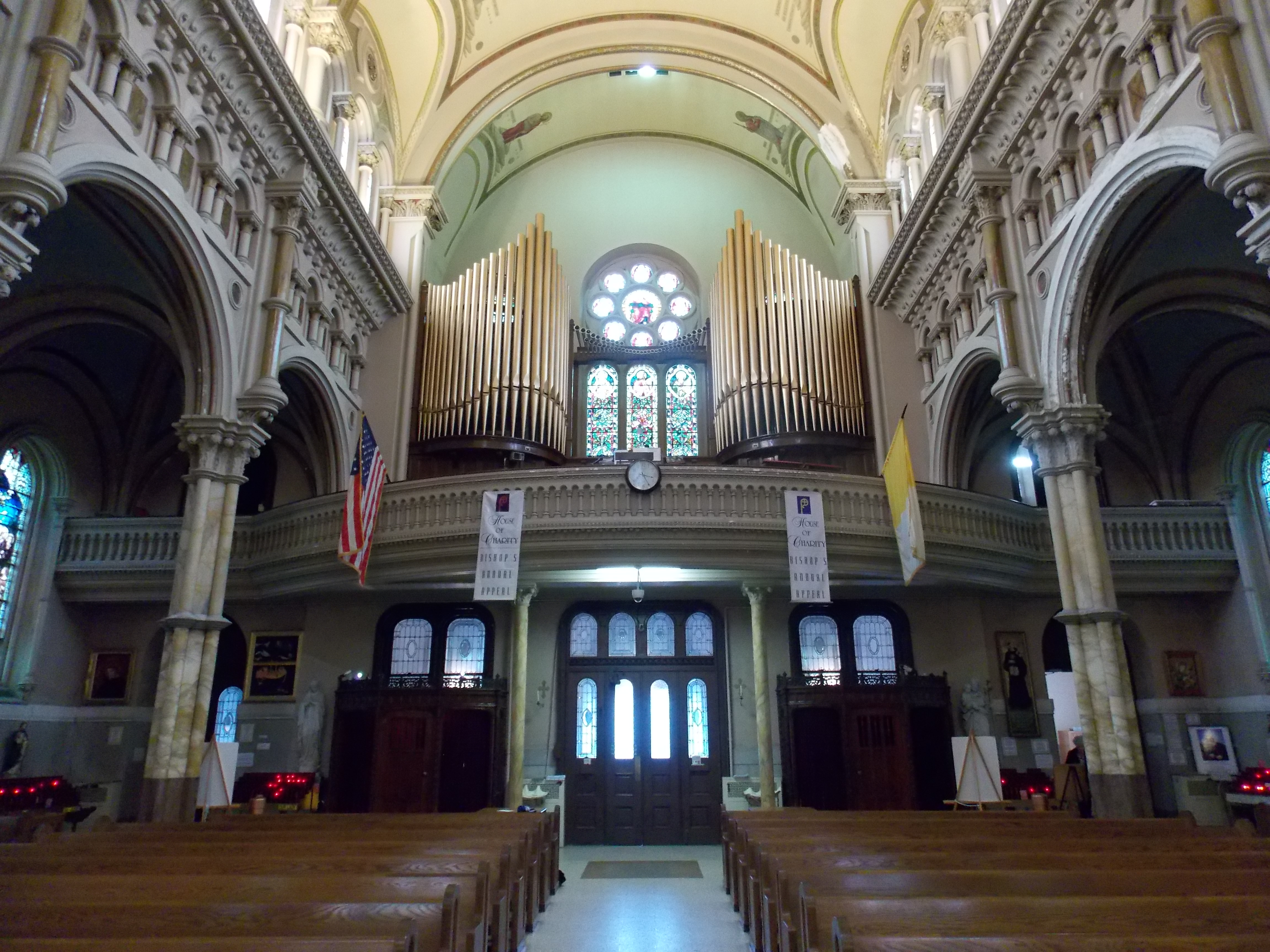
Pipe organ in the gallery

St. Nicholas of Tolentine's 1916 Moller pipe organ (Opus 2138) was rebuilt by Peragallo in 2006 and will be restored over the course of the next several years. The organ at St. Nicholas is one of the busiest in the country, playing at all Masses, at several choir rehearsals per week, and at a host of weddings, funerals, and concerts.

At each of the eleven regularly scheduled Masses, the post-Vatican II Mass is celebrated with music.

John P. O'Neill, an American counter-terrorism expert, working for the FBI, and killed in the September 11 attacks, once served as an altar boy in this church His funeral was held at St. Nicholas of Tolentine Church. He is buried at Holy Cross Cemetery, Hamilton, NJ. He was buried on September 28, 2001

== See also ==
- National Register of Historic Places listings in Atlantic County, New Jersey
