= Bolivian Americans =

Americans of Bolivian birth or descent

Boliviano-estadounidenses (Spanish)

Total population
- 116,646 (2018); 0.04% of the U.S. population (2018)

Regions with significant populations
- Queens, NY; Boston; Philadelphia; Providence, RI; Chicago metropolitan area; Milwaukee metropolitan area; Washington metropolitan area; Charlotte metropolitan area; Metro Atlanta; Miami metropolitan area; Louisville metropolitan area; Houston; Seattle; Denver; Los Angeles

Languages
- American English; Spanish; Aymara; Quechua; Guarani; Spanglish

Religion
- Predominantly Roman Catholic • Protestant • Mennonite, Mormon • Jehovah's Witnesses • Judaism • Atheist • Non-religious

Related ethnic groups
- Bolivians, Afro-Bolivians, White Bolivians, Indigenous peoples in Bolivia, Spanish Americans, Latin Americans, Hispanic Americans, Paraguayan Americans, Argentine Americans, Peruvian Americans, Brazilian Americans, Quechua Alliance, Native Americans

Bolivian Americans or Bolivia-Americans (Spanish: boliviano-estadounidenses, norteamericanos de origen boliviano or estadounidenses de origen boliviano) are Americans of at least partial Bolivian descent.

Bolivian Americans are usually those of Indigenous, Mestizo, or Spanish background but also occasionally having African, German, Croatian, Lebanese, Palestinian and/or Japanese heritage. To a lesser extent, also having Italian or Korean heritage.

Bolivians compose the third smallest Latin American group in the United States, with a 2010 Census population of 99,210. The highest concentration resides in the Washington D.C. metropolitan area, which accounts for 38% of the total Bolivian population in the United States (especially Fairfax County, Virginia). Additional areas of concentration include the New York City borough of Queens, Miami-Dade County, and the cities of Los Angeles and Providence, Rhode Island. In relative terms, a large number of Bolivian-born medical doctors reside in the Chicago metropolitan area.

== History ==
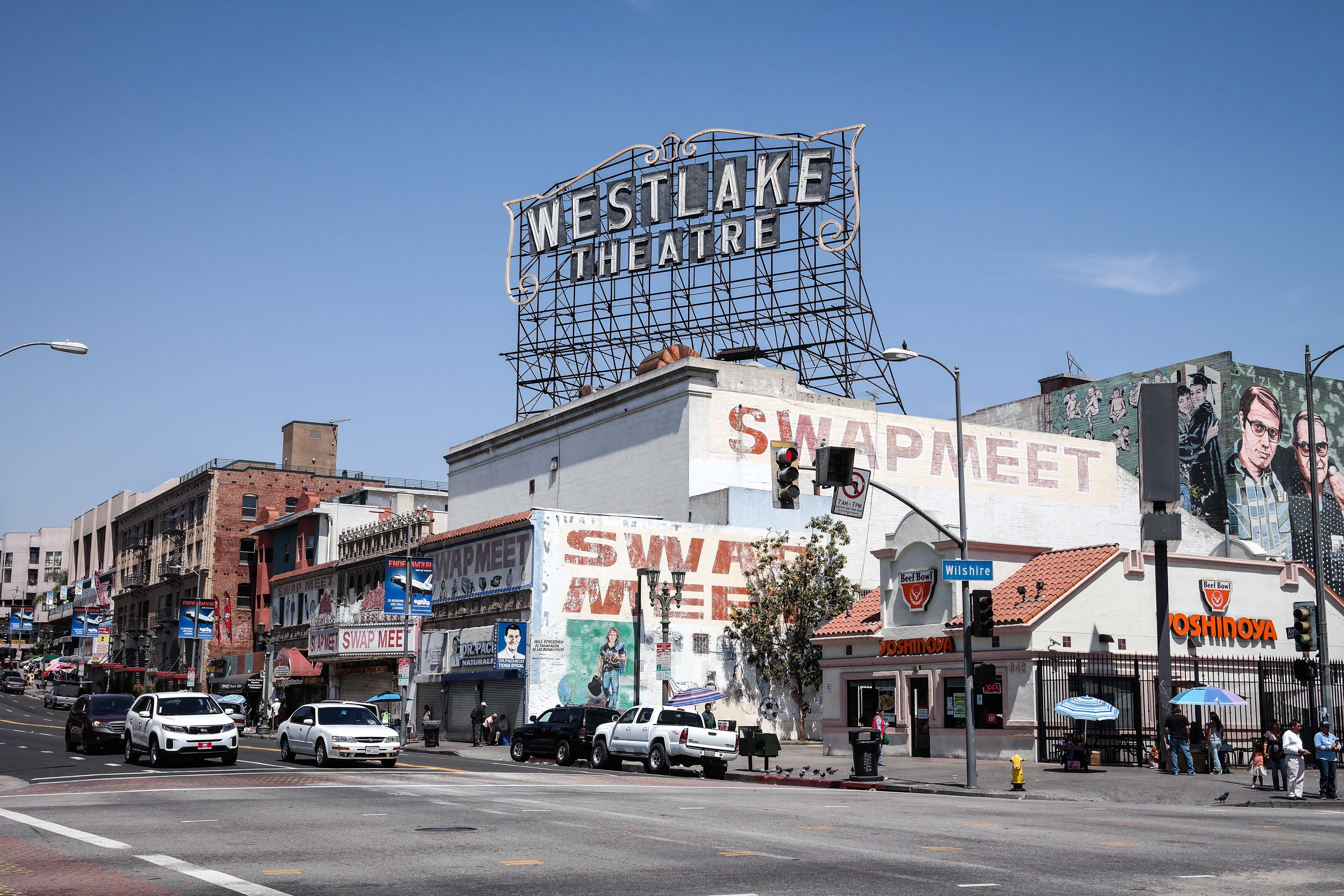
Westlake Theatre building, side wall mural of Jaime Escalante and Edward James Olmos.

Small numbers of Bolivians have been immigrating into the United States since at least the California Gold Rush in the mid-nineteenth century. In the first half of the twentieth century, some upper-class Bolivians came to the United States seeking to further their own and their children's academic education or artistic training, including, for example, Antonio Sotomayor, who arrived in San Francisco in 1923, the father of Raquel Welch, an aeronautical engineering student at the University of Illinois in the 1930s, and the father of violin child prodigy Jaime Laredo, who moved to San Francisco in the 1940s.

Large-scale Bolivian immigration into the United States occurred in two significant phases. The first phase occurred during and subsequent to the 1952 National Revolution (between 1952 and the latter 1960s). Most of these immigrants consisted of middle- to upper-middle income occupational professionals or political dissidents, belonging mainly to Bolivia's European descendant community.

The second notable phase of Bolivian immigration (between 1980 and 1988) was a result of Bolivia's fiscal policies in the 1970s which gave way to the hyperinflation throughout most of the 1980s. Most of these immigrants consisted of lower-income Mestizo (European/Amerindian mix) and Indigenous Bolivians obtaining work posts as service and manual laborers. Most of the Bolivian American population is of Quechua descent, with the majority of them hailing from the Valle Alto region of Cochabamba, from towns like Tarata, Arbieto, Cliza, Punata, and Tolata, with most of them living in the D.C. area. They have also organized themselves into institutions—see "Community" below.

Many Bolivians who emigrated to the United States came as tourists. However, many remained of indefinite way in the country, setting with family and friends. This made it difficult to know the number of Bolivians living in the United States. Between 1984 and 1993, only 4,574 Bolivians got U.S. citizenship. In this period about 457 were naturalized each year.

== Demographics ==
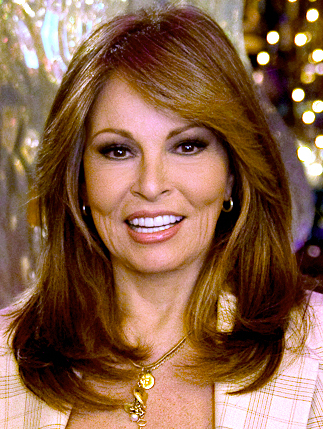
Actress and singer Raquel Welch.

Bolivians have settled throughout the United States, mainly in Washington D.C., California and Maryland; there are also large groups of Bolivian immigrants in Texas, New York City, New Jersey, South Florida, North Carolina, Rhode Island, Massachusetts, and Chicago. The number of Bolivians in the U.S. in 2006 was estimated at 82,322. Most Bolivian immigrants are high school or college graduates; many work in companies, in government or in academia.

== Community ==
Many Bolivian Americans had arrived in the United States under college athletic scholarships (e.g. tennis) in the 1960s and thereafter, for medical residency training, or for post-graduate university education. The first Fulbright Scholars from Bolivia went to the US in the mid-1950s, including the civil engineer Walter Gonzalez Gonzalez and the economist Blanca Sfeir Cavero.

The first Bolivian Americans organised their community and they founded organisations such as the Bolivian American Chamber of Commerce, the Bolivian American Medical Society, and the Bolivian Studies Journal was founded. The Bolivian American Hugo Muriel served as the City of Chicago's Health Commissioner in the Mayor Jane Byrne administration.

Moreover, in the early 1990s, the Bolivian American Medical Society received the Order of the Condor of the Andes award from the then president of Bolivia Jaime Paz Zamora.

The first generation of Bolivian American medical doctors came mostly from the Universidad Mayor de San Simon (Cochabamba) and the Universidad Mayor de San Andres (La Paz). Some of the children of the first generation Bolivian American medical professionals studied medicine as well.

Bolivian Americans also attend various prestigious universities such as Harvard, Yale, Princeton, Stanford, M.I.T., and the United States Military Academy.

The American Bolivian Collective, founded in 2019 by Charlene Amini is one of the largest platforms in the diaspora. It includes Bolivians in the diaspora in the U.S., which is concentrated in areas like DC, Virginia, Maryland, California, and New York. In addition to its digital presence, the Collective organizes cultural events and advocacy efforts to promote Bolivia's heritage and support Bolivian Americans. The organization also offers the 'Janett Adams' scholarship, which awards $1,500 to help Bolivian American students achieve their educational goals.

In Chicago, the group Renacer Boliviano, the core of which hails from La Paz and Oruro, began as a caporales folk dance troupe, expanded into hosting Bolivian carnaval dinner dances in the winter and 6 de agosto barbecues in the summer, and finally has become a charitable organization that raises funds for charities in Bolivia and in northern Virginia, the Arlington Bolivian Soccer League Inc is a 501(c)3 not for profit that has provided funding for erecting in the Tarata town square an equestrian statue of war of independence hero Esteban Arze.

Another way that Bolivian immigrants to the United States maintain community is through annual reunions of graduates of Bolivian high schools, such as the American Institute ("Amerinst"), which has schools in La Paz and Cochabamba, and Colegio La Salle ("La Salle"), which has schools in La Paz, Cochabamba, Oruro, Santa Cruz, and Trinidad. Amerinst was founded by Methodist missionaries from New York and Illinois and La Salle was founded by Catholic Christian brothers from France and Spain. Notable alumni of Amerinst include President Hernan Siles Zuazo and Vice President Juan Lechin Oquendo as well as Bolivian Americans Jorge Berindoague, Michael Jusbasche, Nelly Sfeir Gonzalez, Daisy Urquiola Wende, and Peter F. McFarren. In addition, Chilean writer Isabel Allende is also an alumna of Amerinst. Notable alumni of Colegio La Salle include President Jorge Quiroga, neuroscientist Mohammed Mostajo-Radji, urologist Fernando Gonzalez Sfeir and Nobel laureate in literature Mario Vargas Llosa.

=== Areas ===
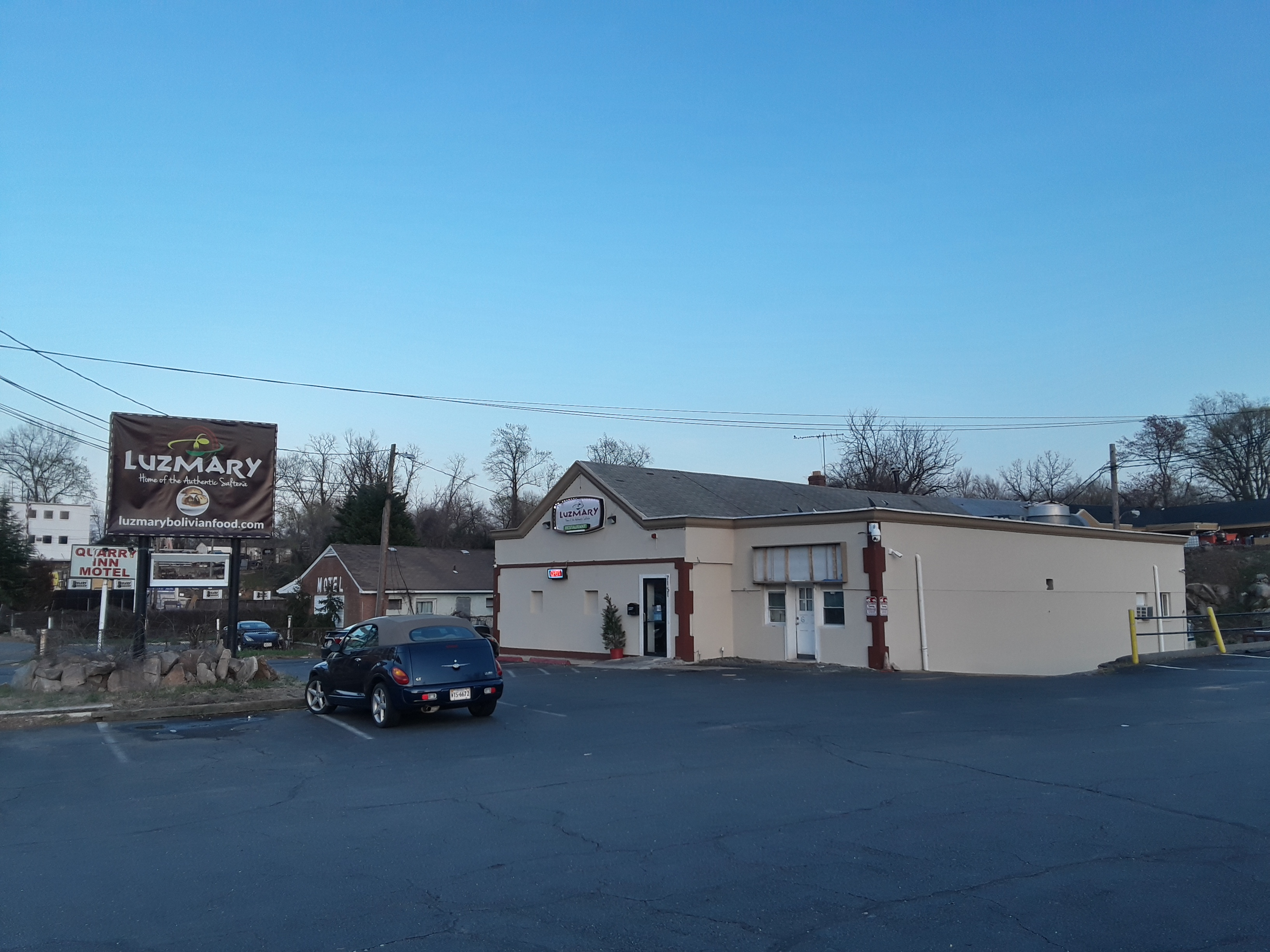
A Bolivian restaurant in Falls Church, Virginia

The largest populations of Bolivians are situated in the following areas (Source: Census 2010):

1. Washington-Arlington-Alexandria, DC-VA-MD-WV MSA – 37,607
2. New York-Northern New Jersey-Long Island, NY-NJ-PA MSA – 9,749
3. Los Angeles-Long Beach-Santa Ana, CA MSA – 7,068
4. Miami-Fort Lauderdale-Pompano Beach, FL MSA – 6,697
5. Houston-Sugar Land-Baytown, TX MSA – 2,359
6. Chicago-Joliet-Naperville, IL-IN-WI MSA – 2,099
7. San Francisco-Oakland-Fremont, CA MSA – 2,078
8. Providence-New Bedford-Fall River, RI-MA MSA – 1,970
9. Dallas-Fort Worth-Arlington, TX MSA – 1,223
10. Boston-Cambridge-Quincy, MA-NH MSA – 1,170
11. Riverside-San Bernardino-Ontario, CA MSA – 1,114
12. San Jose-Sunnyvale-Santa Clara, CA MSA – 898
13. San Diego-Carlsbad-San Marcos, CA MSA and Tampa-St. Petersburg-Clearwater, FL MSA – 808
14. Orlando-Kissimmee-Sanford, FL MSA – 744
15. Baltimore-Towson, MD MSA – 710
16. Atlanta-Sandy Springs-Marietta, GA MSA – 647
17. Seattle-Tacoma-Bellevue, WA MSA – 558
18. Philadelphia-Camden-Wilmington, PA-NJ-DE-MD MSA – 524
19. Salt Lake City, UT MSA – 519
20. Phoenix-Mesa-Glendale, AZ MSA – 502

Immigrants by County 2015-2019

Total immigrant population from Bolivia in the U.S.: 78,900

Top Counties:

1. Fairfax County, VA ---------------------------- 13,000
2. Miami-Dade County, FL --------------------- 4,000
3. Los Angeles County, CA -------------------- 3,600
4. Arlington County, VA -------------------------- 3,600
5. Montgomery County, MD ------------------- 3,500
6. Prince William County, VA ------------------ 3,300
7. Queens Borough, NY -------------------------- 1,800
8. Orange County, CA ----------------------------- 1,800
9. Loudoun County, VA --------------------------- 1,800
10. Providence County, RI ---------------------- 1,700
11. Harris County, TX ----------------------------- 1,600
12. Collier County, FL ----------------------------- 1,500
13. Broward County, FL -------------------------- 1,400
14. Alexandria City, VA --------------------------- 1,300
15. Cook County, IL -------------------------------- 1,100

== Notable people ==
- Charlene Amini - Writer, artist and cultural advocate. Founder of American Bolivian Collective.
- Martin Amini - Comedian (Bolivian mother)
- Derek Asbun - (Bolivian parents) American former rugby union international. Two-time All-American at University of California at Berkeley; 2012 player of the year at Oxford University.
- Annelise Barron - (Bolivian father) PhD in chemical engineering from UC Berkeley; professor of biomedical engineering at Stanford University Medical School; expert on anti-microbial peptoids and Alzheimer's disease
- Juan Fernando Bastos – Bolivian born, American portrait artist
- Stephanie Beatriz, actress (born in Argentina to a Bolivian parent).
- Daniel Bedoya, Bolivian born, Texas resident; elite equestrian show jumper and horse trainer who represented Bolivia in 2018 World Equestrian Games and 2019 Pan American Games.
- Susana "Suzy" Benavides - Bolivian born, professional golfer and golf coach; first Bolivian golfer to quality for a LPGA tournament; All-Big Ten golfer at Ohio State
- Jorge Berindoague – Bolivian born, Chevron executive, former Minister of Hydrocarbons of Bolivia
- F. Xavier Castellanos – pediatric neuroscientist and medical doctor (Born Spain of Bolivian parents)
- Marcelo Claure – CEO of SoftBank Group, and Brightstar Corporation (Born in Guatemala to Bolivian parents). Honored by Carnegie Corporation with its Great Immigrants Award
- Liliana Colanzi – Professor of comparative literature, fiction writer known for environmentalist science fiction
- Heather Conneely - a graduate of American Cooperative School of La Paz, Bolivia and University of Notre Dame (Indiana), Conneely is a Latina business leader who frequently advocates for increased Hispanic representation and investment in corporate America and mainstream media. She was a keynote speaker at the We All Grow Latina Summit 2016. She is a sales and advertising executive, with experience at Univision, Facebook and Meta
- Elysia Crampton – musician of Bolivian Aymara descent
- Windsor del Llano – soccer player
- Pablo Eduardo - Bolivian-born, resident of Massachusetts, sculptor of public tributes to Mayor Kevin White, Cesar Chavez, Charles Darwin, St. Thomas More.
- Jaime Escalante – high school AP calculus teacher, educator; honored by Carnegie Corporation with its Great Immigrants Award
- Katia Escalera - Cochabamba-born operatic mezzo-soprano who resides in San Francisco
- Marcela Escobari - USAID administrator, think tank fellow
- Marco Etcheverry – professional soccer player, U.S. Soccer Hall of Fame
- Eduardo Gamarra, PhD in Latin American studies from the University of Pittsburgh and professor of political science at Florida International University; expert on Latino vote in the United States who appears frequently on television in the United States as an expert on the politics of Bolivia, Cuba, Haiti and Venezuela. Gamarra has also testified before the US Senate Foreign Affairs Committee.
- Steve Gay - pro soccer player and college coach, All-American, member 1972 United States Olympic team
- Walter Gonzalez Gonzalez – civil and structural engineer, first Bolivian Fulbright scholar to the United States, former president of the Society of Bolivian Engineers
- Fernando Gonzalez Sfeir (born 1960 in Bolivia) - medical doctor and surgeon specializing in urology; philanthropist promoting educational excellence at secondary and university level and cultural activities such as classical music.
- Rodrigo Hasbun – professor of Latin American literature, short story writer, novelist
- Pato Hoffmann – movie and TV actor, advocate for American Indians
- Markita del Carpio Landry – chemical engineer, university professor, researcher on nano materials for brain imaging and agriculture (Bolivian mother, French-Canadian father)
- Graciela Lara de Peñaranda - Bolivian women's voting rights activist, family court judge, prosecuting attorney, president of the National Federation of Bolivian Women Lawyers, captain Bolivian army, political exile, naturalized US citizen, language teacher, real estate executive
- Jaime Laredo – Grammy Award-winning musician, violinist, conductor, Queen Elisabeth Competition first prize in violin. Order of the Condor of the Andes(Grand Cross) American Academy of Arts and Sciences
- Efrain Morales - professional footballer
- Luis Morato - instructor of Quechua language at various United States universities
- Jaime Moreno – soccer player, U.S. Soccer Hall of Fame
- Jaime Mendoza-Nava – composer of Hollywood sound tracks and symphony conductor
- Ben Mikaelsen – writer of children's literature
- Mohammed Mostajo-Radji – Bolivian born, neuroscientist, science educator, diplomat
- Cecilia Muñoz – public servant
- Eddy Navia – charango virtuoso, musician, Latin Grammy nominee
- Carla Ortiz - movie actress
- Maria Otero - NGO executive and government official specializing in international relations and microfinance; served as Under Secretary of State for Civilian Security, Democracy, and Human Rights under President Barack Obama from 2012-2013. Honored by Carnegie Corporation with its Great Immigrants Award
- Josh Reaves – professional basketball player for Dallas Mavericks of the NBA (mother Bolivian)
- Andrew Rutherfurd (swimmer) - (born 1988; Bolivian mother) represented Bolivia at 2012 Summer Olympics
- Vicente Sarmiento – economist, lawyer, politician
- Carol Schumacher - Bolivian-born American mathematician and university professor. Daughter of LeGrand Smith, former superintendent of The American Institute ("Amerinst") in La Paz.
- Carlos Scott – retired Bolivian-American soccer midfielder
- Emily Georgette Sfeir (born 1988), Bolivian junior triathlon champion; American graduate of West Point Military Academy '09, senior officer US Army and Afghan War veteran Three siblings and father are also veterans of armed forces of the United States.
- Nelly Sfeir de Gonzalez – Bolivian-born, women's suffragist, lawyer, academic librarian, bibliographer, journal editor
- Eleanor Sillerico - Civil Engineer and Tunnel Construction Manager who worked on the construction of the Elizabeth Line subway in London, U.K. and the Metro Purple Line extension in Los Angeles, California. Sillerico has also worked on tunneling projects in Bolivia, Spain and Georgia. Her most recent tunneling project is the Hudson River Tunnel Project connecting New Jersey and New York City. Sillerico won the 2002 Premio Ing. Walter Gonzalez for academic excellence at the UMSA university in La Paz, Bolivia.
- Antonio Sotomayor - San Francisco based cartoonist, painter, muralist and art teacher. Art Commissioner of the City of San Francisco. Painter of six murals for the nave of Grace Cathedral, San Francisco depicting the history of the Anglican/Episcopalian community in San Francisco, beginning in 1849
- Leo Spitzer – Bolivian-born son of Austrian Jewish refugees, college professor, historian, author
- Chris Syler – singer-songwriter
- Alberto Torrico – member of the California Unemployment Insurance Appeals Board
- Ana-Maria Vera, US-born (Bolivian father, Dutch mother) concert pianist, who played for President Jimmy Carter at the White House as an 11-year-old child and whose recording of Mozart and Haydn concertos with the Rotterdam Philharmonic was awarded a Gold Record by Philips Records; promoter of classical music in Bolivia
- Raquel Welch – Golden Globe-winning actress, iconic sex symbol and author (father Bolivian)
- Alejandro Mario Yllanes - Born Oruro 1913, died New York City 1962 Painter and print maker influenced by Mexican muralists, including Diego Rivera.
- Erika Zavaleta - American professor of ecology and evolutionary biology at the University of California, Santa Cruz (father Bolivian)

== See also ==
- Bolivia–United States relations
