= Sfeir =

Sfeir (Arabic: صفير) is a Maronite surname from Lebanon. Notable people with the surname include:

- Alfredo Sfeir (born 1947), Chilean economist, spiritual leader and healer
- Andree Sfeir-Semler (born 1953), German–Lebanese art historian and gallery owner
- Antoine Sfeir (1948–2018), Franco-Lebanese journalist and professor
- Dahd Sfeir (1932–2015), Uruguayan actress
- Fernando Gonzalez Sfeir (born 1960), Bolivian-born American urologist
- Jacqueline Sfeir (1956–2013), Palestinian educator and academic
- Mauricio González Sfeir (born 1956), Bolivian petroleum company executive and soccer promoter
- Nasrallah Boutros Sfeir (1920–2019), Lebanese cardinal and patriarch of the Maronite Church
- Nelly Sfeir-Gonzalez (1930–2020), Bolivian–American academic librarian
- Paul Sfeir (born 1965), Chilean politician
- Salim Sfeir (born 1944), Lebanese–Swiss banker and financier
