= Clodoaldo (disambiguation) =

Clodoaldo (born 1949), Clodoaldo Tavares de Santana, is a Brazilian football midfielder.

Clodoaldo is a given name. It may also refer to:

- Clodoaldo Caldeira (1899-unknown), known as Clodô, Brazilian football defender
- Clodoaldo do Carmo (born 1968), Brazilian steeplechase runner
- Clodoaldo Soto Ruiz (fl. 1976-present), Peruvian scholar and author
- Clodoaldo (footballer, born November 1978), Clodoaldo Paulino de Lima, Brazilian football striker and attacking midfielder
- Clodoaldo (footballer, born December 1978), Francisco Clodoaldo Chagas Ferreira, Brazilian football striker
- Clodoaldo Silva (born 1979), Brazilian Paralympic swimmer

== See also ==
- Clodoald (522–560), Merovingian prince, hermit and monk
- Clodualdo del Mundo (disambiguation)
