= Walter González =

Walter González may refer to:

- Walter Gonzalez (engineer) (1924-1979), Bolivian civil and structural engineer
- Walter González (footballer) (born 1995), Paraguayan footballer
