= American Cooperative School of La Paz =

American international school in La Paz, Bolivia

Coordinates: 16.542919°S 68.089250°W

- La Paz; Bolivia

Information
- Established: 1955; 71 years ago
- Grades: K-12
- Language: English
- Website: https://acslp.org/

American Cooperative School of La Paz or ACS Calvert (ACS), is an American international school in La Paz, Bolivia, serving kindergarten through grade 12.

== History ==
It was founded in 1955, with six students being taught in a house in La Paz. This number grew to 23 students under one teacher the end of 1955. The school expanded due to a wave of Americans coming to Bolivia, and in 1958 the school relocated to the Goethe Institute. Later that year the school moved to Calle 13 Calacoto, and at the same time the Bolivian Ministry of Education approved the "Cooperative Experimental School"'s designation as an experimental school. The United States Agency for International Development (USAID), around 1960, gave the school a grant to purchase a new campus. That year, there were 316 students.

The master plan for the current school campus was completed in 1963. The school attempted to establish a partnership with the Colegio Franklin Delano Roosevelt, The American School of Lima in Lima, Peru; As part of this in 1964 it briefly changed its own name to "Franklin D. Roosevelt School," but the attempted partnership failed and the name changed to American Cooperative School in 1965.

The school follows the United States academic calendar (August to May) as well as a curriculum typical of schools in the United States. The language of instruction is English, although Spanish is offered as a foreign language. The school is exempt from the requirements of the Bolivian ministry of education regarding school curriculum, academic calendar, and rules and regulations regarding school uniforms and teaching of Quechua and Aymara.

The Southern Association of Colleges and Schools accredited the school in 1968, and during the same year the Bolivian Ministry of Education began to allow graduates of the school to obtain Bolivian bachillerato high school diplomas.

The "golden age" of the school was in the 1960s during President John F. Kennedy's "Alliance for Progress" program when large amounts of United States foreign aid were allocated to Bolivia for the purpose of building road networks. improving public health, and improving the Bolivian military. During this period approximately 80% of the students enrolled at the school were Americans (children of diplomats, military personnel and ex patriate businessmen), with the balance being children of international diplomats and well-to-do Bolivians. In the 21st century, the demographics of the school have changed substantially, with the overwhelming majority of the students being from affluent Bolivian families who desire their children to receive a United States primary and secondary school education.

Through the years, the school has welcomed some illustrious visitors. In 1969 (after his historic walk on the moon), astronaut Neil Armstrong visited the school during his second visit to Bolivia, which also included stops at the Salar de Uyuni, Valle de la Luna, and the Universidad Mayor de San Andres observatory at Chacaltaya glacier. On December 3, 1996, first lady Hillary Rodham Clinton visited the school community during her participation in the 6th Summit of the First Ladies of the Americas, hosted by Bolivia. During this visit, first lady Hillary Clinton was gifted a bouquet of roses by 8-year-old second grader, which she had hand-picked from her mother's rose garden. On August 8, 2014, Jaime Laredo and the Orchestra of Fundacion Bolivia Clasica gave a concert performance at the Michael Donahue Theater at the school.

Graduates and former students of the school have gone on to university studies at America's Top Colleges, including Harvard, Yale, Princeton, Stanford, MIT, West Point, and other centers of academic excellence.

== Campuses ==
The former Calle 13 Calacoto location, as of 2015, houses the Hotel Calacoto.

Today's campus is on the estate of the former manor house and gardens of the hacienda of the Julio Patino family, which prior to 1952 (Bolivian National Revolution) owned most of the Calacoto district. The land was used for growing corn and peaches and for grazing dairy cows. The main entrance was at the intersection of what today is Calle 10 Calacoto and Av. Julio Patino. It had a grand entrance flanked by large pine trees. The manor house itself occupied a promontory overlooking formal gardens and a small one-meter-deep lagoon below. The school had the lagoon drained to convert the space into a large expanse of playing fields. Nelly Sfeir Gonzalez and her husband Walter Gonzalez Gonzalez, parents of four students, took the initiative in planting pine trees along the eastern perimeter wall of the playing fields and in opening a back gate to the alley that gave access to Av. Sanchez Bustamante, in the vicinity of what is today the embassy of the Oriental Repulic of Uruguay.

As of 2015 the only portion of the USAID-purchased campus still remaining is the playground's garden bridge, which is made of stone. When the school purchased the campus the "Casa del Sol" and "Patino House" were already present, and the school later constructed and demolished additional buildings.

== Notable alumni ==
- Daniel Bedoya, Bolivian born, Texas resident; elite equestrian show jumper and horse trainer who represented Bolivia in 2018 World Equestrian Games and 2019 Pan American Games.
- Patricia G. Cavero (1961), Bolivian-born, American medical doctor Board-certified in cardiology, graduate of Northwestern University School of Medicine, with residency at Mayo Clinic and fellowship at UC San Francisco.
- Marcelo Claure, billionaire entrepreneur; owner of Club Bolivar, the most successful professional football-soccer team in the history of Bolivia
- Heather Conneely - graduate of ACS-Colegio Calvert, La Paz, Bolivia and University of Notre Dame (Indiana); sales and advertising executive at Univision, Facebook and Meta
- Maria Eguia, Bolivian national swimming champion and medalist (bronze in 100 meter backstroke and silver in 4x100 medley relay) at the 1977 Juegos Bolivarianos (Bolivarian Games, a South American regional multi-sport competition)
- Eduardo Gamarra, PhD in Latin American studies from the University of Pittsburgh and professor of political science at Florida International University; expert on Latino vote in the United States who appears frequently on television in the United States as an expert on the politics of Bolivia, Cuba, Haiti and Venezuela. Gamarra has also testified before the US Senate Foreign Affairs Committee.
- Fernando Gonzalez Sfeir (1960), Bolivian-born, American medical doctor and surgeon, Board-certified in urology
- Mauricio Gonzalez Sfeir, business executive educated at Yale University, Oxford University, and Harvard Business School; former Secretary of Energy of Bolivia. Earned varsity blue for lawn tennis at Oxford University.
- Vivian Reynolds, Bolivian junior tennis champion; architect and landscape designer educated at Univ. of Oregon (Fulbright Scholar), Kyushu Univ. (Japan), and Univ. of New Mexico.
- Emily Georgette Sfeir, Bolivian junior triathlon champion; 2009 graduate of the United States Military Academy at West Point and combat veteran of Iraq and Afghanistan.
