= Elva Ambía =

Peruvian Quechua writer

- Born: 1941 (age 84–85); Huancavelica, Peru
- Occupation: Writer
- Writing career
- Language: Quechua, Spanish
- Years active: 2012–present
- Genres: Children's literature, non-fiction
- Notable work: Qoricha (2017)
- Notable awards: Quechua Award for Lifetime Achievement

Elva Ambía (born 1941) is a Peruvian award-winning educator, Quechua language activist, writer, and founder of the Quechua Collective of New York.

== Early life ==
A Quechua native speaker, Elva Ambía was born in the Andean region of Huancavelica and grew up in Chincheros, Apurímac; then migrated to Lima, the country's capital. Due to the country's economic situation and to help her family in Peru, she migrated to the United States at the age of 22. In New York City she worked at sewing factories, social service offices and schools.

== Quechua language activism ==
Ambía said that her activism started when she tried to find Quechua books at her local public library, and realized she couldn't find any. Then, she felt the need to promote this language and culture of the Andes. In 2012 she co-founded the Quechua Collective of New York. The organization's mission aims to preserve and diffuse Quechua languages through workshops, cultural events, and educational programming in New York City.

The documentary Living Quechua (2015) features Elva Ambía's work on promoting Quechua and Indigenous Languages in the United States. In 2018 Ambía received the Quechua Award for Lifetime Achievement by The Quechua Alliance.

== Literary works ==
In 2017 she published Qoricha, a trilingual children's book in Quechua, Spanish and English.
