= Fernando Gonzalez Sfeir =

Bolivian American medical doctor and surgeon, specializing in urology; philanthropist

Fernando Gonzalez
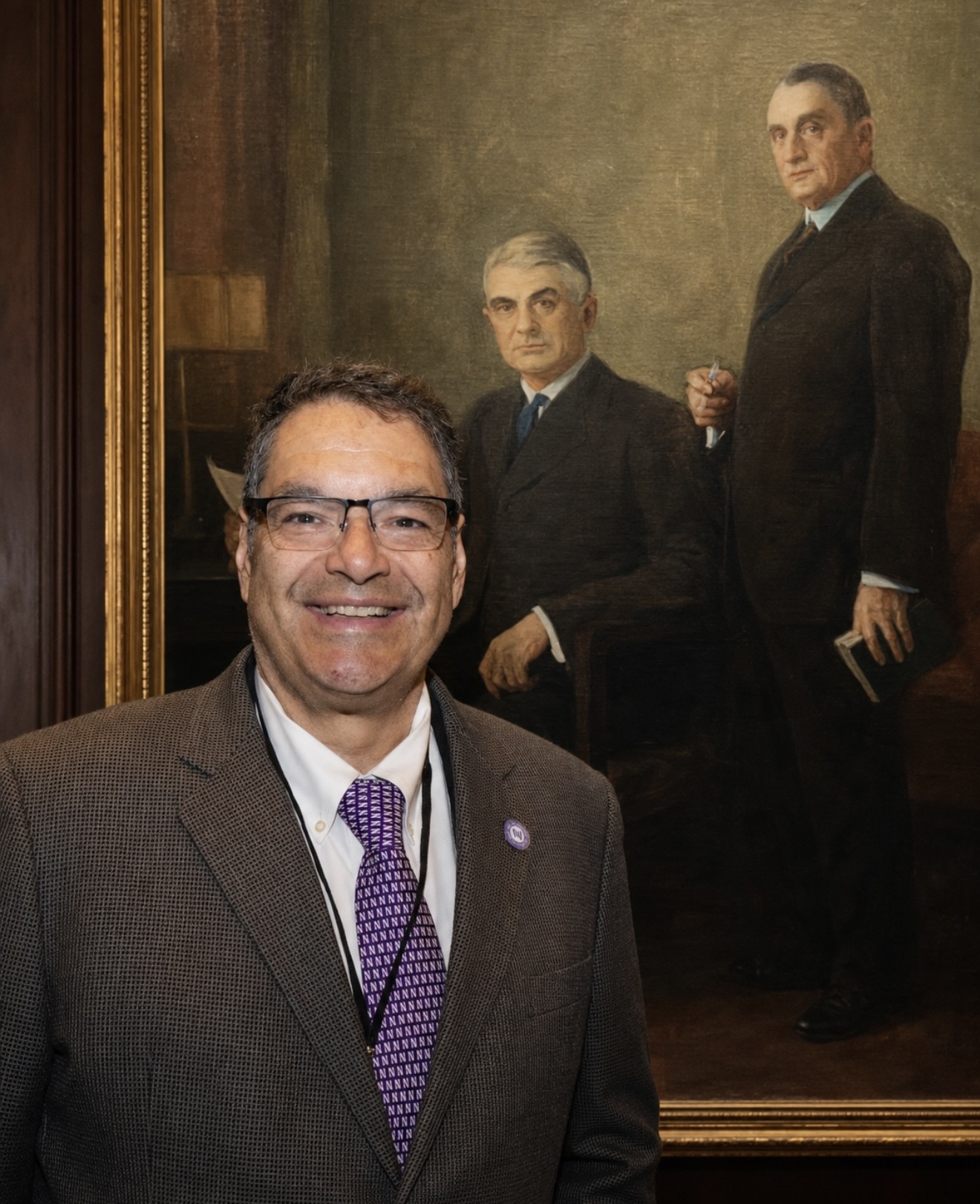
- Gonzalez in front of portrait of Charles and William Mayo at Northwestern University Feinberg School of Medicine
- Born: Luis Fernando Gonzalez-Sfeir; 1960 (age 65–66); La Paz, Bolivia
- Education: A.B. Biology, Harvard University (1981); M.D., Northwestern University Feinberg School of Medicine (1985); Residency at New York University Medical Center and Memorial Sloan Kettering Cancer Center (1985–1991)
- Occupation: Urologist
- Years active: 1985–2022
- Known for: Clinical urology; prostate cancer treatment (including brachytherapy); minimally invasive urologic surgery
- Parents: Walter Gonzalez Gonzalez (father); Nelly Sfeir Gonzalez (mother)
- Relatives: Mauricio Gonzalez Sfeir (brother); Pietro Sfair (great uncle); Gran Sandy (second cousin); Mohammed Mostajo-Radji (third cousin, once removed)

Fernando Gonzalez (born 1960) is an American medical doctor, physician and surgeon, board certified in urology. He is also referred to as Fernando Gonzalez Sfeir, especially in Spanish-speaking countries. He was educated at Harvard University and Northwestern University, with residency training at New York University Medical Center, Bellevue Hospital, and Memorial Sloan Kettering Cancer Center. In the medical profession, he is best known for teaching and demonstrating novel surgical and treatment techniques for caring for patients with prostate cancer, in particular brachytherapy, to his Latin American colleagues. Beyond the medical profession, he is best known for his support and advocacy of Jaime Laredo as a cultural ambassador and of the National Geographic Society as a promoter of exploration and protector of Earth's wilderness areas.

== Early life and education ==
Fernando Gonzalez Sfeir was born in La Paz, Bolivia in 1960. His parents were Walter González González, a civil engineer, and Nelly Sfeir de Gonzalez (nee Nelly Sfeir Cabero), a lawyer. On his father's side, he is of Spanish and Quechua descent; on his mother's side, he is of Lebanese, Spanish and Quechua descent. He has four brothers. Gonzalez and his family have expressed pride in being partly descended from Inca nobility. His early schooling was at the American Cooperative School of La Paz (Colegio Calvert).

His family emigrated to the United States in 1967 during a time of Bolivian political instability, which included Che Guevara's insurgency. The family settled in Champaign-Urbana, Illinois, where Gonzalez attended elementary school at Yankee Ridge School. Gonzalez's family returned to La Paz, Bolivia in 1974. During one school year in Bolivia, Gonzalez attended the Colegio LaSalle, at the time an all-boys school of the De La Salle Brothers, a Roman Catholic teaching order.

In 1977, Gonzalez graduated from Champaign Centennial High School, where he was a National Merit Scholar and a US national prize winner, 1977 "Century III Leaders" sponsored by the National Association of Secondary School Principals. During his high school years, he played on the varsity tennis team, winning team conference and district titles as a sophomore and serving as team captain as a senior.

Gonzalez attended Harvard University's Harvard College from 1977 to 1981, graduating in June 1981 with an A.B. in biology. During his freshman year, Gonzalez lived at Holworthy Hall and during his sophomore year he lived at South House in the Radcliffe Quadrangle (Harvard). For his final two years, he lived at Leverett House. Gonzalez developed a special bond with the Master of Leverett House Kenneth R. Andrews, who was also a professor of business strategy at Harvard Business School, based on their shared connection to Champaign-Urbana, Illinois. Gonzalez concentrated in biology during college but had a secondary in folklore and mythology. Gonzalez's father Walter Gonzalez Gonzalez died from pancreatic cancer on October 17, 1979, during the first semester of his junior year of college. This reinforced Gonzalez's determination to pursue a career in medicine.

Gonzalez attended the School of Medicine at Northwestern University in Chicago, Illinois from 1981 to 1985.At medical school, Gonzalez was mentored by Dr. John T. Grayhack, a "world-renowned physician surgeon, researcher and scholar." Gonzalez has been quoted as saying that "I was able to learn from him and admire him--not just as a teacher but as a doctor--and just as a wonderful human being. He really opened my eyes as someone I could aspire to be."

== Medical residency ==
Gonzalez was a medical resident at the New York University Medical Center from 1985-1991. From 1985-1987 he was a resident in general surgery; from 1987-1991 he was a resident in urology. His training included work at Bellevue Hospital and the Memorial Sloan Kettering Cancer Center. Published accounts reference a couple of noteworthy examples of patients expressing their gratitude for care they received from Gonzalez. In one case, a Nobel laureate gifts to Gonzalez an autographed copy of his most well-known book dedicated to Gonzalez; in another case, the grateful patient is a Bolivian immigrant who owns a restaurant in Queens and refuses to take payment from Gonzalez for a meal after he recognizes him as his medical doctor.

== Career ==
Gonzalez was a keynote speaker at the V Congress of the American Confederation of Urology ("Confederacion Americana de Urologia") held at La Paz, Bolivia on March 18-20, 1999. He demonstrated for his Bolivian and Latin American colleagues advanced surgical techniques, especially with respect to brachytherapy for prostate cancer. Gonzalez was licensed to practice medicine in Illinois, Indiana and New Mexico. Gonzalez is a peer reviewer for articles on surgery and urology for the Journal of the National Hispanic Medical Association. Gonzalez is a member Fellow of the Royal Society of Medicine, headquartered in London, England. Gonzalez has been a benefactor to the Ryan AbilityLab in Chicago, the Carle Foundation Hospital in Urbana, Illinois, and Solidarity Bridge, Inc., an Illinois not-for-profit that provides free surgical care and training to underserved communities in Bolivia and Paraguay.

== Advocacy ==
Gonzalez has been an advocate for the international recognition of the Bolivian-born violin virtuoso Jaime Laredo. In January 2026, he authored a commentary in the Bolivian newspaper El Diario (La Paz) describing Laredo as a "most excellent cultural ambassador of the Bolivia Brand," and calling for the Bolivian foreign ministry to launch a diplomatic initiative to support the nomination of Laredo for the 2026 Princess of Asturias Prize in the Arts. On December 24, 2025, Gonzalez visited Laredo in the green room of Carnegie Hall following Laredo's farewell concert of Mozart compositions.

Gonzalez, together with his brother Javier, supported the campaign to obtain international recognition for the Club de Tenis La Paz (La Paz, Bolivia) on its centenary (1925–2025).

Gonzalez has a long-standing relationship with The National Geographic Society, being a member of the Grosvenor Council. On June 16–18, 2026, Gonzalez was a guest of honor of the National Geographic Society for the unveiling of its new Museum of Exploration.

Gonzalez is also a benefactor of the "Premio a la Excelencia Academica Ing. Walter Gonzalez" at the Universidad Mayor de San Andres and the Colegio La Salle, La Paz, Bolivia.

== Personal life ==
Gonzalez's godson is Rhodes Scholar and Stanford-educated mathematician and statistician Xavier Gonzalez Smith, who works in the field of Artificial Intelligence in Silicon Valley.

Gonzalez is a naturalized US citizen, who has expressed his gratitude to, and admiration for, the United States of America in connection with the Sesquicentennial in 2026. He has native fluency in English and Spanish, and he studied German in high school. A Roman Catholic, he is also a member of the Order of Saint Sharbel (Saint Charbel Makhlouf)..

== Family tradition in medicine ==
Fernando Gonzalez-Sfeir comes from a family with a history in medicine. His mother's great grandfather was Dr. Salvador Cabero Rollano (Tiquipaya), one of the founders of the first general hospital in Cochabamba, Bolivia, the Hospital Clinico Viedma (1880-1884). A maternal uncle was Dr. Jorge Cavero Ugarte, a founding member of the Bolivian American Medical Society. In the early 1990s, the Bolivian American Medical Society received the Order of the Condor of the Andes award from the then president of Bolivia Jaime Paz Zamora. Gonzalez's older brother, Walter Ramiro Gonzalez Sfeir, educated at the University of Seville (Spain), was an intensivist.
