= Kichwa Hatari =

Kichwa-language radio station in the U.S.

- Type: Radio network
- Country: United States
- Availability: Online
- Launch date: 2014
- Official website: kichwahatari.org

Kichwa Hatari is the first Kichwa-language radio station in the United States, broadcasting in a variation of the Quechua language spoken by indigenous Ecuadorean Kichwas.

== History ==
Kichwa Hatari was founded in 2014 in New York, to broadcast from New York City in Kichwa. The Kichwa language is a regional variation of the Quechua language, and has been listed by UNESCO as an endangered language. Hosts Charlie Uruchima, Segundo Angamarca, and Fabian Muenala use radio as a platform to connect the Ecuadorean diaspora with indigenous language, culture, and local news. A language segment of the show helps children of Kichwa-speaking immigrants learn their parents language. The hosts report that they have seen increased pride in indigenous culture as a result of their work to raise awareness through radio.

The station broadcasts online as well as on Radio El Tambo Stereo.

== Community activism ==
Kichwa Hatari hopes to combat language isolation by Kichwa-speakers in the United States. In addition to radio broadcasting, Kichwa Hatari works within the Kichwa diaspora to help undocumented immigrants, by translating legal information from Spanish into the Kichwa language and helping to share it in the community.

In 2017 Kichwa Hatari received the Quechua Award for Lifetime Achievement by The Quechua Alliance
