= Nelly Sfeir Gonzalez =

Librarian and bibliographer

Nelly Sfeir de Gonzalez (July 1, 1930 – November 29, 2020) was a Bolivian and American librarian and bibliographer at the University of Illinois. She was a two-time winner of the Jose Toribio Medina International Prize for Latin American bibliographies (for her scholarship about Gabriel Garcia Marquez), a president of Seminar on the Acquisition of Latin American Library Materials, and a founder of the Bolivian Studies Journal. In her country of birth, Bolivia, she was a university student leader, women's suffragist and licensed lawyer.

== Early life and education ==
Sfeir-Gonzalez was born on July 1, 1930, in Cochabamba, Bolivia. Her parents were Emilio Sfeir Sfeir and Maria Cabero Candia. Accordingly, Sfeir-Gonzalez's maiden name was Nelly Esther Sfeir Cabero. She had four siblings: Jorge, Jose, Blanca and Yolanda.

Her father was an immigrant from the Keserwan District of Mount Lebanon, at the time of his birth part of the Turkish Ottoman Empire. Portions of the Keserwan District had been granted to the Sfeir family by King Godfrey of Bouillon of the Crusader Kingdom of Jerusalem during the time of the First Crusade. To this day, the Keserwan District is known as "the castle of the Christians" and approximately 90% of its population is Christian, overwhelming Maronite Catholic.

In contrast, the family of Sfeir-Gonzalez's mother had deep roots in Cochabamba. Maria Cabero's grandfather Salvador Cabero Rollano, a medical doctor, was one of the founders of the Hospital Clinico Viedma, the first general hospital in Cochabamba; her grandmother Petronila Zeballos Terrazas owned a large landed estate, comprising several micro climates, each suitable for a specialized agricultural use, in Tiquipaya ("the place where there are many flowers" in the Quechua language) and Petronila's brother, Angel Maria Zeballos, was the bishop of Cochabamba (he is buried in the Cathedral of Cochabamba).

Sfeir-Gonzalez's lived her pre-school years in Jujuy, Argentina and her primary school years in the Bolivian altiplano mining town of Oruro, where her father owned a lamb leather tanning factory. Later the family moved to the capital and largest city La Paz, where Sfeir-Gonzalez and her siblings attended the American Institute (also known as the Instituto Americano), a school founded by Methodist missionaries from New York and Illinois. While most of her middle and secondary school studies were undertaken at the American Institute, Sfeir-Gonzalez spent her last years of high school, and graduated from, Colegio Santa Ana (La Paz) in 1947.

Following high school, Sfeir-Gonzalez studied law at night while working as a clerk at the Romecin department store during the day. Sfeir-Gonzalez studied law at the Higher University of San Andrés (Universidad Mayor de San Andres) in La Paz. She was one of only two women in the graduating class, the other being Graciela Lara de Peñaranda. During her time at UMSA, Sfeir-Gonzalez played an active role in the fight for women's suffrage in Bolivia, serving as the president of the Union Femenina Universitaria (Women’s Student Union) and organizing protest marches in 1952 to advocate for women to receive the right to vote in Bolivian national elections, which resulted in Bolivian women obtaining such right. She was also a co-founder of the University Student Theater at UMSA, helping to stage "Nuestra Natacha" by Alejandro Casona as the inaugural production.

She married civil engineer Walter Gonzalez Gonzalez in 1953 and they raised five sons together, including Dr. Walter Ramiro Gonzalez, business executive Mauricio Gonzalez Sfeir, corporate lawyer Javier Gonzalez Sfeir, Dr. Fernando Gonzalez Sfeir and CPA Sergio Antonio Gonzalez. Her father Emilio Sfeir was a hero of Bolivian counter-intelligence during the Guerra del Chaco against Paraguay (Chaco War). Her paternal uncle was the Most Reverend Pietro Sfair, Titular Archbishop of Nisibis (Nusaybin) of the Maronite Catholic Church of Antioch. Her older sister Blanca Filomena Sfeir Cabero, an economist who earned a Master's degree in business studies from the University of Iowa in 1950, was the first woman from Bolivia to receive a scholarship from the Institute of International Education (the predecessor to the Fulbright Scholarship) and served as chief procurement officer for Corporacion Minera de Bolivia—COMIBOL. First cousin Jose Antonio Teran Cabero (known as "El Soldado") is a two-time winner of the Bolivian national poetry prize. A nephew was entertainer Alejandro Hangano Cassab (el "Gran Sandy", famous for his summertime appearances at the Festival de Vina del Mar in Chile. One of her sons, Mauricio Gonzalez Sfeir served as Secretary of Energy of Bolivia. One of her grandsons was the first Bolivian-American to be awarded a Rhodes Scholarship.

== Career ==
Sfeir-Gonzalez graduated from the UMSA law school in 1953. From 1955 to 1959, she accompanied her husband to the University of Illinois at Urbana-Champaign, where he was a graduate student on a Fulbright Scholarship. Upon their return to Bolivia, Sfeir-Gonzalez served as a grade-school Spanish teacher at the American Cooperative School of La Paz starting in 1959. In 1967, Gonzalez and her family moved to Urbana, Illinois, where Sfeir-Gonzalez enrolled in the University of Illinois' Master of Library Science program, graduating with honors and inducted into the Beta Phi Mu honor society in 1973.

Thereafter, she embarked on a 30-year career at the University of Illinois library, beginning at the clerk level, receiving promotions all the way up to a tenured professorship in Library Administration, and culminating in her appointment as the Head of the Latin American and Caribbean Library in 1986. During her academic career Nelly Sfeir de Gonzalez authored or co-authored five books, including two annotated bibliographies of Nobel laureate Gabriel Garcia Marquez, each of which was awarded the Jose Toribio Medina international prize for best Latin American bibliography of the year in 1987 and 1995, respectively. She also authored 25 chapters in diverse books, 17 articles in journals, and presented 39 papers at academic conferences. Moreover, she obtained more than 40 research grants for the University of Illinois library. She became a naturalized citizen of the United States of America in the bicentennial year of 1976.

In 1991, Sfeir-Gonzalez served as a founding-editor of the Bolivian Studies Journal.

In 1994, Sfeir-Gonzalez served as the president of Seminar on the Acquisition of Latin American Library Materials.

Sfeir-Gonzalez died from COVID-19 at Carle Foundation Hospital in Urbana, Illinois, on November 29, 2020. She was 90 years old.

== Encounter with Che Guevara's Sleeper Spy in Bolivia ==
In January 1965, Nelly Sfeir Gonzalez read a classified note placed in a La Paz newspaper by Laura Gutierrez Bauer, a German-Argentine residing in Bolivia, offering private German lessons. Sfeir-Gonzalez hired Senorita Gutierrez Bauer for language classes for her two oldest sons. The instruction was given at the Gonzalez home in Calacoto, a southern residential district of the City of La Paz. Mrs. Gonzalez thought that Miss Gutierrez Bauer was a highly skilled teacher, who had the latest in miniature tape recording equipment. After each teaching session, she would politely request the use of the Gonzalez telephone to make a number of phone calls. So impressed was Sfeir- Gonzalez with Miss Gutierrez Bauer, and fearing that she might lose interest in teaching German to the Gonzalez children because of Miss Gutierrez Bauer's long commute from the city center to the southern district, Sfeir-Gonzalez recommended Miss Gutierrez Bauer to a neighbor who also had school-aged children, Colonel Edward Fox, the US Air Force attaché in Bolivia. After more than one year of giving German classes to the Gonzalez children, Miss Gutierrez Bauer notified Sfeir-Gonzalez that she would not be able to continue with the language instruction as she was about to embark on an extended trip to the Bolivian countryside to research Bolivian folk music. Only in September 1967 did Sfeir-Gonzalez learn that Miss Gutierrez Bauer was "Tania," a sleeper spy of the Che Guevara urban intelligence network in La Paz during Che's Bolivian Campaign. Tania was her nome de guerre. Her real name was Tamara Bunke. She died of gunfire on August 31, 1967 in an ambush as her guerrilla column attempted to ford a tributary of the Rio Grande river in eastern Bolivia. Subsequently, it was revealed that Colonel Edward Fox was the top CIA agent in Bolivia during the 1960s.

== Premio Ing. Walter Gonzalez a la Excelencia Academica ==
In 1994, in honor of her deceased husband, Nelly Sfeir Gonzalez established the Premio Ing. Walter Gonzalez a la Excelencia Académica for the top civil engineering student in the graduating class at the Universidad Mayor de San Andres. The prize has been awarded continuously for more than 25 years. It consists of a diploma, a medal of honor, and a monetary payment.

== Support for the Harvard Catholic Center ==
Nelly Sfeir Gonzalez has supported the Harvard Catholic Center by being one of the principal donors for the beautification of the Chapel of Women Doctor of the Church at St. Paul Church (Cambridge, Massachusetts). In particular, she sponsored the writing of the icon of St. Teresa of Avila, which she gifted to the Chapel in honor of her grandchildren and Harvard College undergraduate students Xavier Gonzalez, class of 2018, and Natasha Gonzalez, class of 2020.

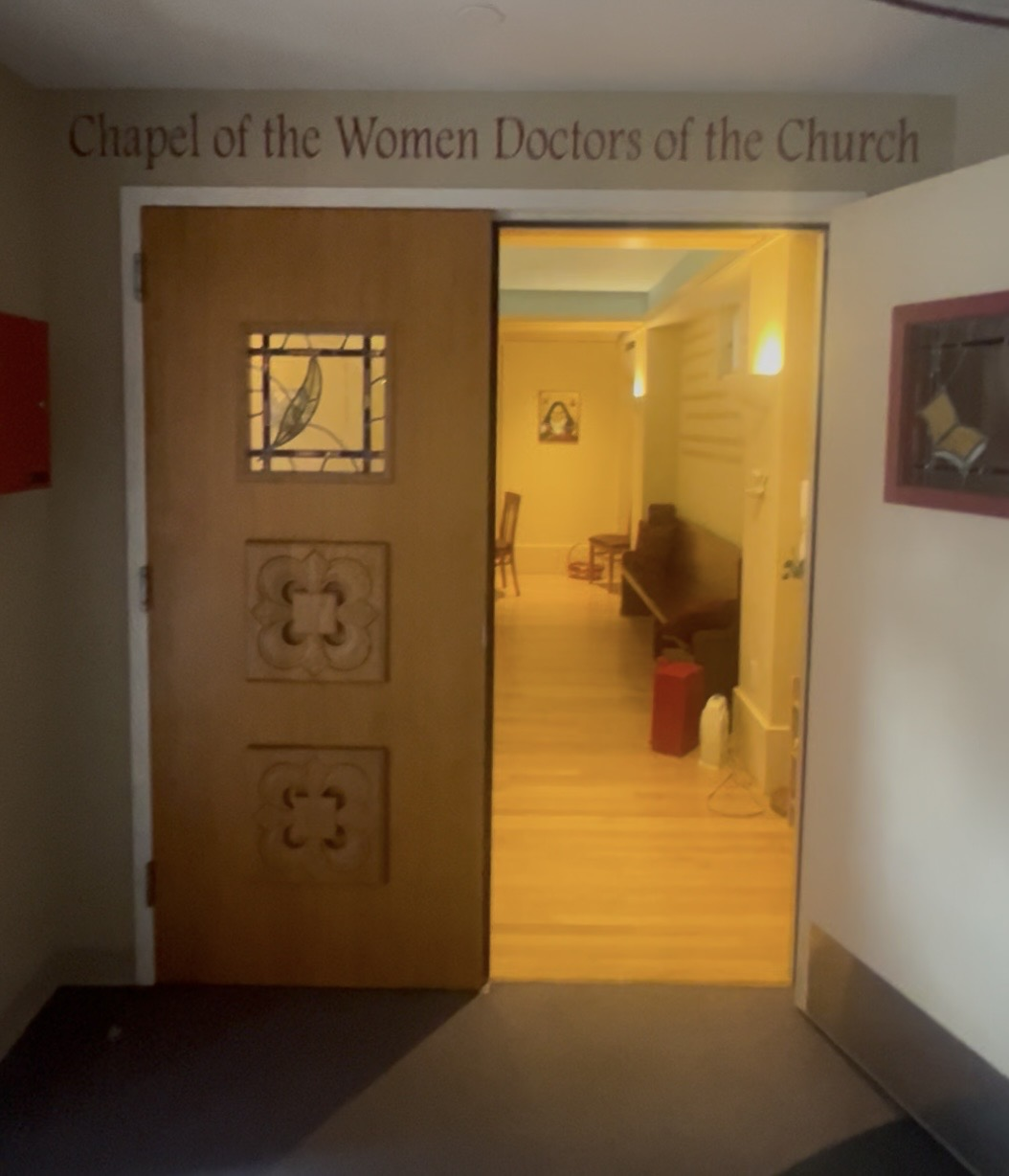
Entrance to the Chapel of the Women Doctors of the Church

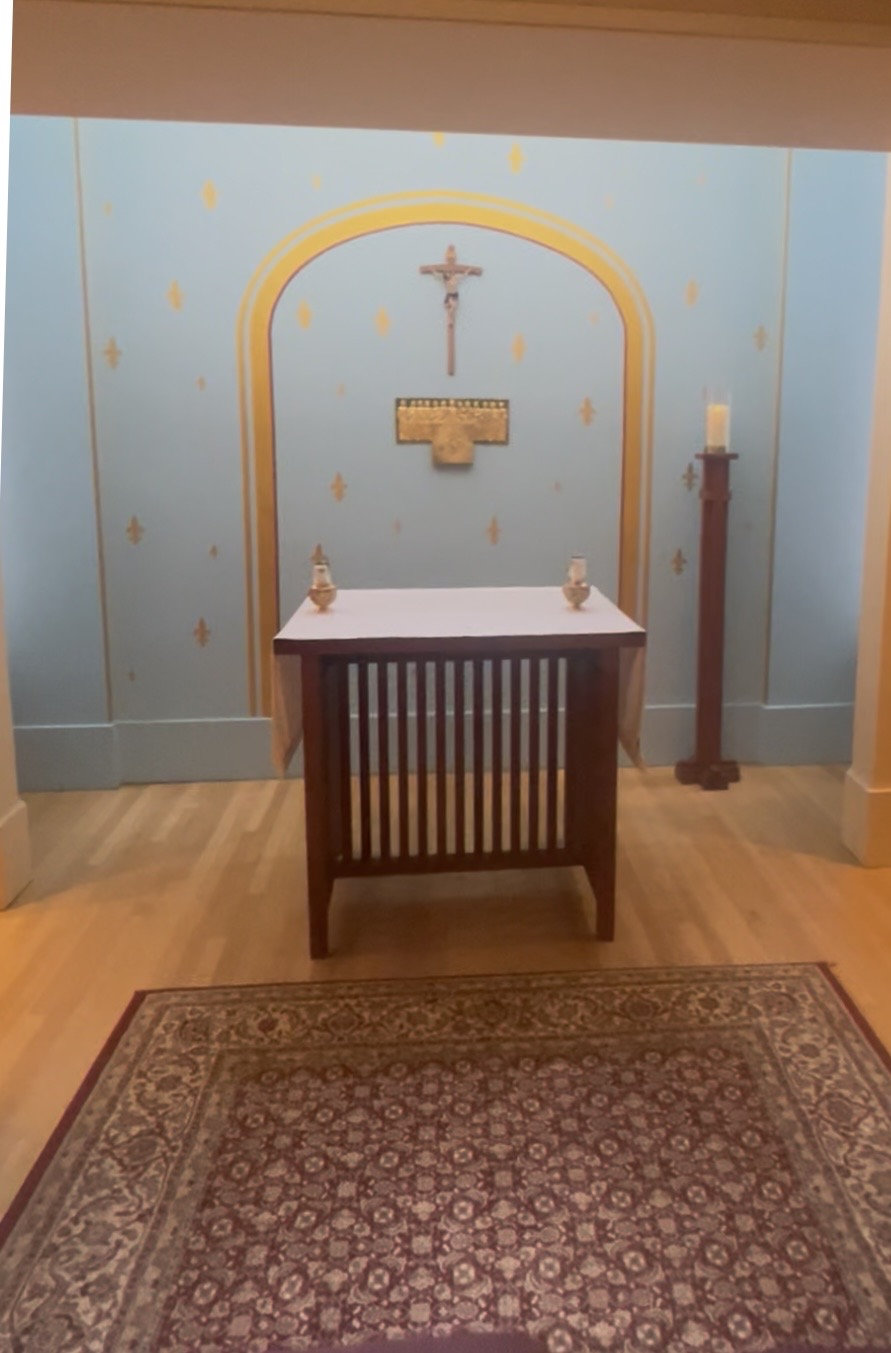
Altar of the Chapel of Women Doctors of the Church

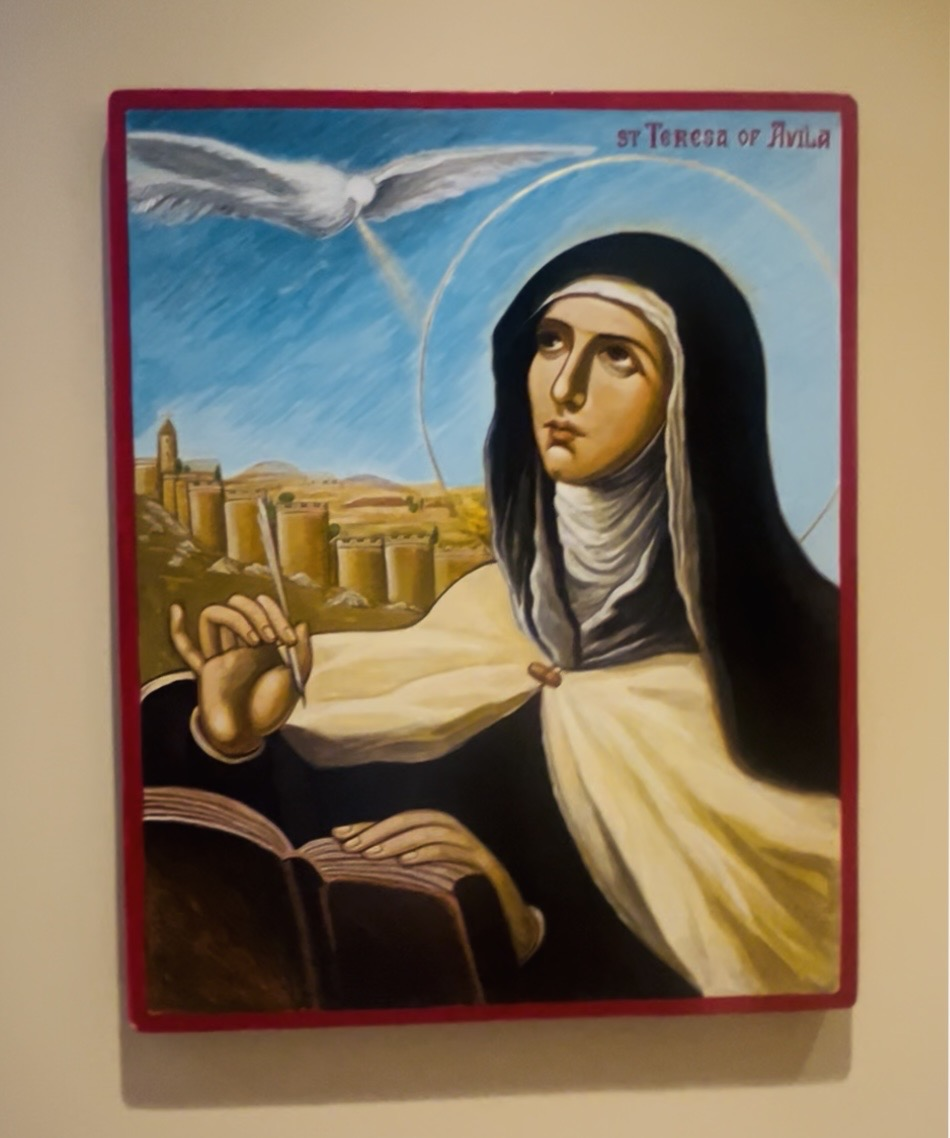
Icon of St. Teresa of Avila

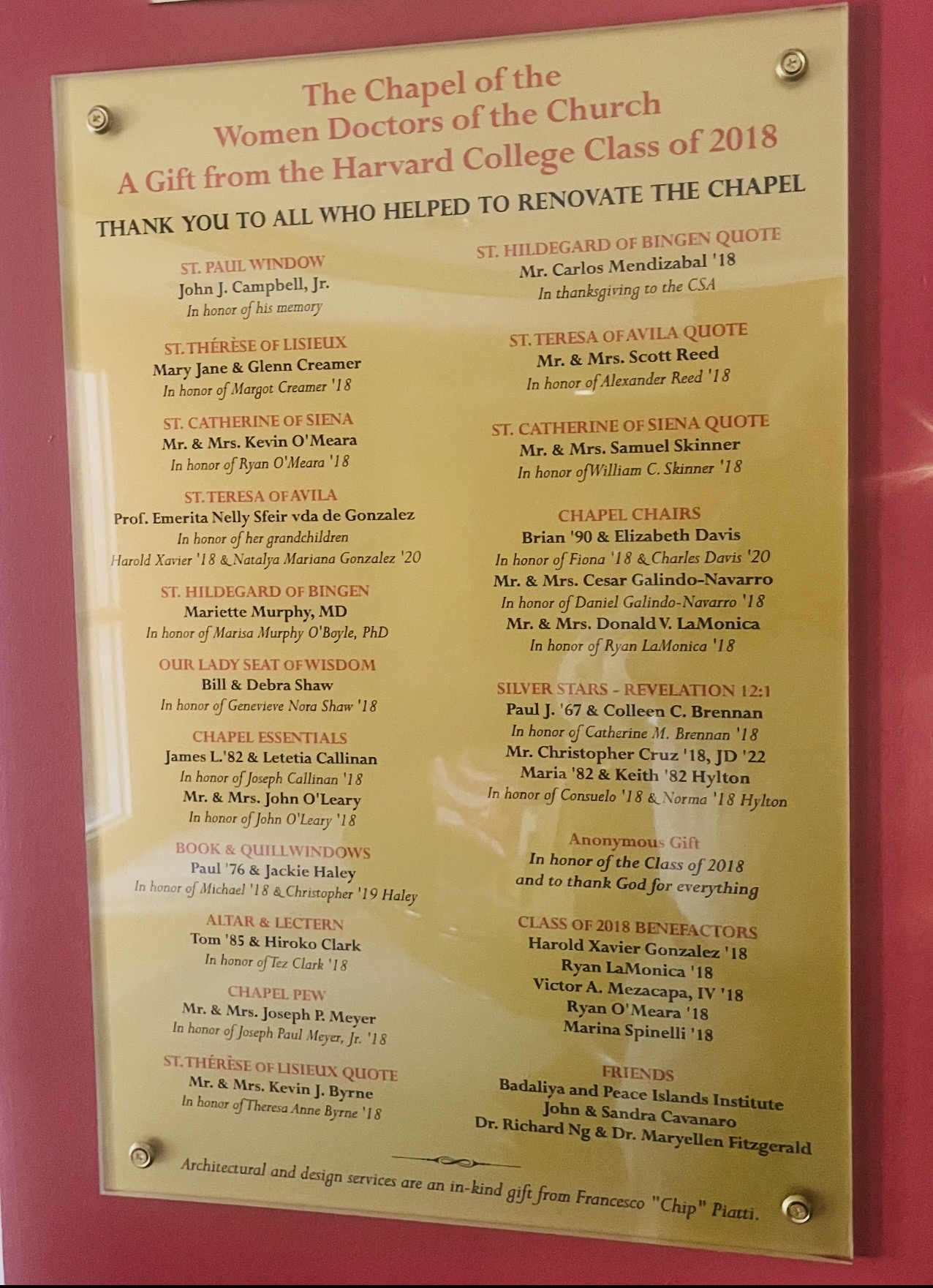
Plaque of benefactors of the Chapel of Women Doctors of the Church

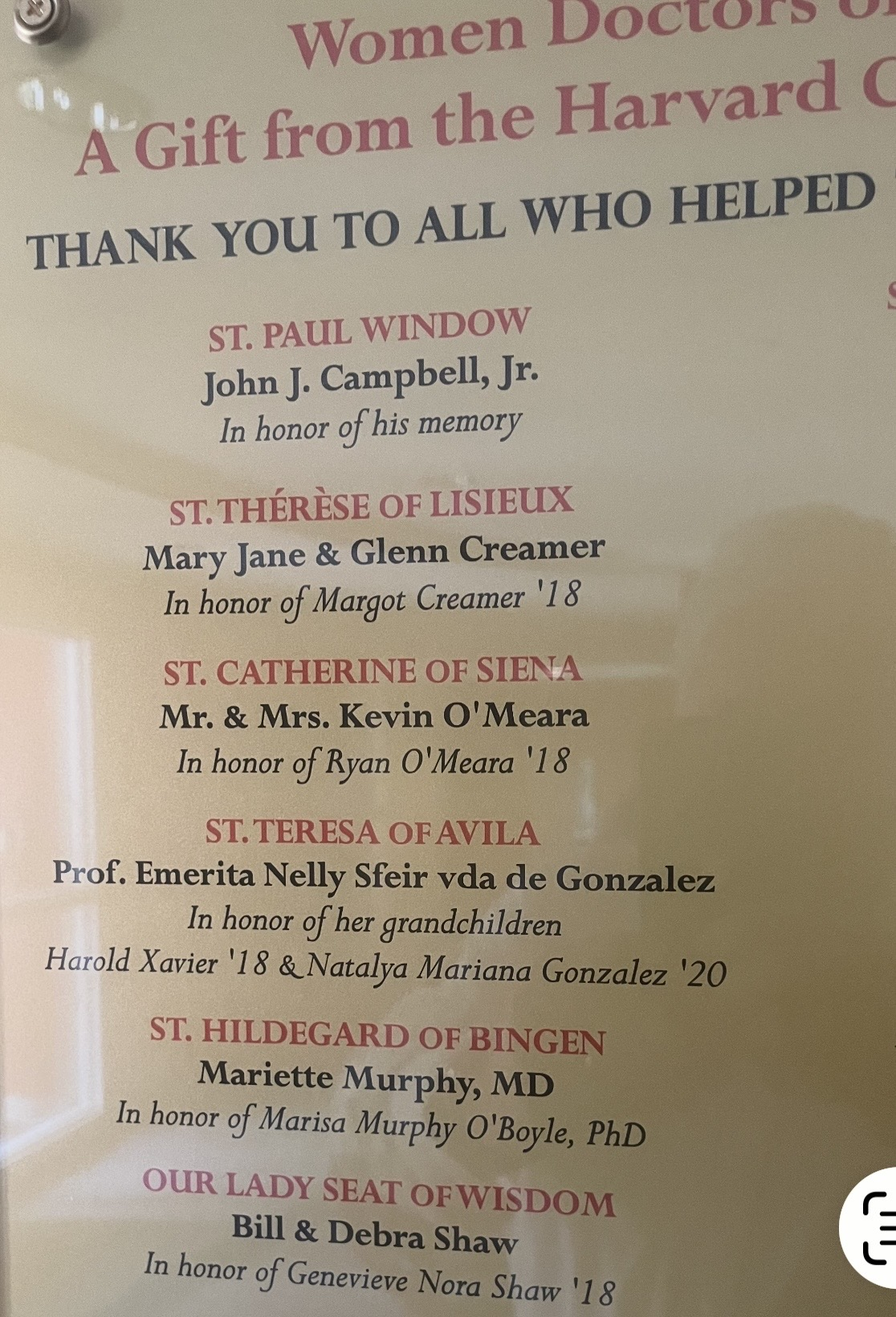
Nelly Sfeir Gonzalez named on plaque in reference to icon of St. Teresa of Avila

== Selected publications ==
- Gonzalez, Nelly Sfeir de, ed. (1986). Bibliographic guide to Gabriel García Márquez. 1986/92 / comp. by Nelly Sfeir de González. Bibliographies and indexes in world literature. ISBN 978-0-313-28832-6.

== Honors and awards ==
Sfeir-Gonzalez has twice received the José Toribio Medina Award from the Seminar on the Acquisition of Latin American Library Materials, first in 1987 and a second time in 1995 for her work on Gabriel García Márquez.

Sfeir-Gonzalez also received the following professional recognition:

- Special Guest Librarian at the Guadalajara International Book Fair (1994)
- Award of Merit from the Hispanic American Periodicals Index (2001)
- Invited U.S. librarian at the Buenos Aires International Book Fair (2003)

In 2009, the Seminar on the Acquisition of Latin American Library Materials awarded her with an honorary lifetime membership in recognition of career achievement. The same year, the Hispanic American Periodicals Index gratefully recognized her for 30 years of volunteer service to HAPI.
