= Jacqueline Sfeir =

Childhood education expert (1956–2013)

Academic background
- Education: University of Northern Colorado
- Thesis: Development and validation of the school entrance exam for the West-Bank of Jordan (1984)

Jacqueline Sfeir (16 April 1956 – 5 April 2013) was a Palestinian expert in early childhood education.

== Education ==
Sfeir was a student in the first class when Bethlehem University started taking students in 1973. Her doctoral work centered on pre-schooling and education.

== Career ==
In 1985 Sfeir was a founder of the Early Childhood Resource Centre in Jerusalem; the goal of the group was to improve education for pre-school children. She worked with teachers and parents to change the conditions under which children were educated.

In 1989 Sfeir spoke of how drawings by Palestinian children reflected their upbringing during times of regional conflict. In 2005, her presentation in British Columbia was questioned given her opposition to cooperation with Israel.

In 2001, she was appointed to a five-year term as a member of the Pontifical Council for the Laity. In 2005, she founded MaDad, an independent company that uses and develops the Holistic Integrated Approach, also referred to as holistic education, in its work with both local and regional actors who deal and interact daily with children.

In 2007 Sfeir was elected to receive a fellowship from the non-profit organization Ashoka.

She died of cancer on 5 April 2013, at the age of 56.

== Publications ==
- Sfeir, Jacqueline (1984). Development and Validation of the School Entrance Exam for the West-Bank of Jordan. University of Northern Colorado, Department of Early Childhood Education.
- Sfeir, Jacqueline (November 2005). "Education in Bethlehem". This Week in Palestine. No. 91. Archived from the original on 2012-03-18.
- Sfeir, Jacqueline; Gilkes, Julia (2006). Challenges and Initiatives in Early Childhood Education. Arab Resource Collective.
- Sfeir, Jacqueline (2006). النوع الاجتماعي والنظام التربوي الفلسطيني في المرحلة الأساسية: تقرير الدراسة التجريبية لفحص جدوى آلية بحث كمية نوعية للتحليل [Gender and the Palestinian educational system in the basic stage: Report of a pilot study to examine the feasibility of the amount of quality search mechanism for analysis] (in Arabic).
- Sfeir, Jacqueline (October 2006). "The impact of the Israeli occupation on the education of Palestinian children – a young Palestinian teacher's profile". This Week in Palestine. No. 102. Archived from the original on 2007-02-11.
- Adults and children learning, 2001:Pilot study to validate a qualitative/quantitative method to gender analysis of the Palestinian system of basic education (GAPSBE)
- النوع الاجتماعي والنظام التربوي الفلسطيني في المرحلة الأساسية : تقرير الدراسة التجريبية لفحص جدوى آلية بحث كمية نوعية للتحليل (Gender and the Palestinian educational system in the basic stage: Report of the pilot study to examine the feasibility of a qualitative and quantitative research mechanism for analysis)
