= Mauricio González Sfeir =

Bolivian executive (born 1956)

- Born: 1956 (age 69–70)
- Education: Yale University A.B. Economics; Harvard Business School M.B.A.
- Occupations: Petroleum company executive and president of the Bolivian professional football teams The Strongest and La Paz F.C.
- Known for: former Secretary of Energy of Bolivia with responsibility for building the Bolivia to Brazil gas pipeline

Mauricio González Sfeir (born 1956) is a former Secretary of Energy of Bolivia, former petroleum company executive and former president of the Bolivian professional football teams The Strongest and La Paz F.C. Gonzalez served as president of YPFB (Yacimientos Petroliferos Fiscales Bolivianos) and Secretary of Energy of Bolivia in the mid-1990s. He is a co-author of the Baker Institute's "Americas Project." He has also been involved in philanthropic activities with educational institutions, both in the United States and in Bolivia.

== Early life and education ==
Gonzalez was born in 1956. His father was civil engineer, university dean and Amazon explorer Walter Gonzalez Gonzalez and his mother was librarian, bibliographer and academic journal editor Nelly Sfeir Gonzalez. He is the second of five brothers. Medical doctor and surgeon Fernando Gonzalez Sfeir is one of his brothers.

Gonzalez attended primary school in La Paz, Bolivia at the American Cooperative School of La Paz. One of his classmates was Eduardo Gamarra. During 1965-66, Tamara Bunke, also known as Tania the Guerrillera and a comrade in arms of Che Guevara, came to his home in the Zona Sur of La Paz to give him and his older brother Walter Ramiro private German language lessons. His family emigrated to the United States in 1967 during a time of political instability in Bolivia. He attended middle school and high school in Urbana, Illinois, graduating from Urbana High School (Illinois) in 1973. He was a three-year letterman in varsity tennis and team captain his senior year. He was also in the marching band and wrote for the school newspaper's sports page.

Gonzalez studied economics at DePaul University and Yale University and finance & management at Harvard Business School. He pursued post-graduate studies at Oxford University, while on a Marshall Scholarship.

Gonzalez represented Bolivia in Junior Davis Cup tennis competition at the South American level, taught tennis at the Welby Van Horn Tennis Camp, and played on the varsity tennis teams of DePaul University under coach George Lott and Oxford University, where he earned two varsity Blue (university sport). Together with Geoff Tabin, he initiated the Oxford tradition of tennis spring break trips to Spain.

== Career ==
After graduating from Harvard Business School, Gonzalez worked as an international management consultant in the London office of The Boston Consulting Group.

Gonzalez served as Secretary of Energy of Bolivia and Executive President of Yacimientos Petroliferos Fiscales Bolivianos under first administration of President Gonzalo Sanchez de Lozada.

He is a past president of The Strongest football club, a past president of the La Paz Football Association and a past vice-president of the Bolivian Football Federation (Federación Boliviana de Fútbol). Gonzalez has promoted Bolivian football (soccer), including junior and women's divisions. He has advocated for the proposition that the Bolivia national team and Bolivian club teams should be allowed to play-official international matches—including World Cup qualifying games—in the high-altitude cities of La Paz, Oruro, and Potosi. He is a leading member of an ad hoc committee of prominent Bolivians formed to design a strategy to campaign against the FIFA altitude ban.

González is based in Bolivia and the United States.

In La Paz, Bolivia, on 14 October 2024, celebrating the centenary of the birth of Walter Gonzalez Gonzalez, Gonzalez was the keynote speaker at the XXXIst Awards Ceremony for the Premio Ing. Walter Gonzalez a la Excelencia Academica at the UMSA (Universidad Mayor de San Andres).

== Personal life ==
Gonzalez has three children, two daughters and one son. His eldest daughter is a medical doctor and his son is an MBA graduate of Harvard Business School.
