= Quechua Alliance =

Andean culture community organisation

The Quechua Alliance
- Type: Community organization
- Purpose: Language rights
- Region served: United States
- Method: Education
- Website: www.thequechua.org

The Quechua Alliance is a community organization that promotes and celebrates Andean culture in the United States.

== Annual meetings ==
Since 2015, the Quechua Alliance has held annual meetings where students, activists, academics, and the interested public participate to learn about innovative projects in the different varieties of Quechua, as well as to raise awareness about the relevance of the Indigenous languages of the Americas. For each edition, about one-hundred people from across the US participate.

The first editions were held at the University of Pennsylvania, in Philadelphia (2015, 2016, 2018) and also has been hosted at New York University in New York City (2017), at Ohio State University in Columbus (2019), at the University of California, Berkeley (2020 - virtual), and at Harvard University (2023) in the Boston area.

== Quechua Award for Lifetime Achievement ==
The Quechua Alliance yearly acknowledges persons who have dedicated their lives to the promotion of Quechua languages and Andean culture. The awardees include: Clodoaldo Soto Ruiz (2015), Julia García (2016), Kichwa Hatari (2017), Elva Ambía (2018), Luis Morato (2019) and Yarina (2023).

== Awards on Quechua Digital Activism ==
Since 2020, in collaboration with the Quechua programs at the universities of Pennsylvania, Illinois, and Peru's Ministry of Culture, those awards were created with the aim of raising awareness of the importance of language rights for Indigenous Languages speakers and to recognize the work of educators using digital platforms in Quechua.
