= Antoine Sfeir =

Franco-Lebanese journalist

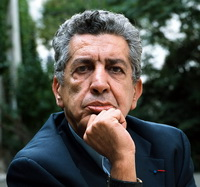
- Antoine Sfeir in 2006
- Born: 25 November 1948; Beirut, Lebanon
- Died: 1 October 2018 (aged 69); 15th arrondissement of Paris, France (or simply Paris)
- Resting place: Montparnasse Cemetery
- Education: Université de Paris; Collège Notre-Dame de Jamhour; Université Saint-Joseph de Beyrouth
- Occupations: Journalist, Political scientist, Writer, Lecturer
- Employers: La Croix * L’Orient-Le Jour * Université de Paris
- Organization: Grande Loge de France (since 1997)
- Known for: President of the Institut libre d’étude des relations internationales (2014–2018); Director of Les Cahiers de l’Orient
- Awards: List of awards: (To be detailed if available)

Antoine Sfeir (November 25, 1948, Beirut, Lebanon - October 1, 2018, Paris, France) was a journalist and political scientist and author of numerous works on subjects related to the Middle East and the Muslim world.

Founder of Les Cahiers de l'Orient (Notebooks from the East), he chaired the Center for Studies and Reflection on the Near East (Cerpo) and the Free Institute for the Study of International Relations (ILERI), and taught international relations at the CELSA Sorbonne University.

== Biography ==
=== Early life ===
Antoine Sfeir was born on November 25, 1948 in Beirut, Lebanon, in a family of Maronite Christians. At one and a half years old, he contracted polio. From this illness, he kept a slight lip defect (facial paralysis) for the rest of his life.

He studied at the Collège Notre-Dame de Jamhour then at the Saint Joseph University of Beirut, and began studying medicine.

=== Career ===
Sfeir was the editor of the French journal, Les Cahiers de l'Orient (Notebooks from the East), a quarterly publication devoted to the Arab and Muslim world, and the president of the CERPO (Study and Research Center on the Middle East). A former professor of international relations at the CELSA (Paris-Sorbonne University) school, he was also president of the ILERI international relations school (Institut Libre d'Etude des Relations Internationales).

On 13 June 1976, he was kidnapped by pro-Syrian militiamen from the Popular Front for the Liberation of Palestine. He was held captive for seven days, during which he was tortured (bayonet in the back, blows with the butt on the fingers and in the jaw, torn nails). This episode pushed him to leave Lebanon to take refuge in France, where he arrived on 3 September 1976. His knowledge of Arab countries and the Muslim world means that he quickly becomes an expert solicited by French media to decipher current events in the Middle East.

A recognized expert on Islam, Sfeir warned against the dangers of radicalism as soon as in the 2000s : "...foreign imams often found an all too willing audience in France's rundown immigrant suburbs. The kids there already watch Arab stations on satellite TV, with their bloodthirsty slogans and anti-western propaganda. They've already been totally radicalized."

Sfeir wrote numerous books about Islam and the Middle East; one of which was The Columbia World Dictionary of Islamism, translated by John King (Columbia University Press). He was often interviewed about international affairs on television talkshows, newspapers, and Administration commissions.

In his book Tunisie, terre de paradoxes published in 2006, he was accused of supporting the regime of Ben Ali in particular by denying its police and authoritarian character. Sfeir replied that he always considered "the Tunisian people as an example for the whole region" in terms of education, modernization and regional integration, as well as in the fight against religious fundamentalism". But in February 2011, Sfeir admitted that he was "heavily mistaken" on Tunisia and the Ben Ali regime.

Sfeir was made an Officer of the Legion of Honour in 2009. He died on 1 October 2018.

=== Family ===
Antoine Sfeir is the father of three daughters, the eldest of whom, Marie-José, Les Cahiers de l'Orient.

== Honours ==
- Legion of Honour – Knight (2000)
- Legion of Honour – Officer (2009)
- National Order of Merit – Knight (1995)
- National Order of Merit – Officer (2004)

== Works ==
- Sfeir, Antoine (1992). L'Argent des Arabes. Hermé.
- Sfeir, Antoine (1993). L'Atlas des religions (Republished 1999 ed.). Perrin.
- Sfeir, Antoine (1997). Les Réseaux d'Allah (Republished 2011 ed.). Plon.
- Sfeir, Antoine (2002). Dictionnaire mondial de l'islamisme. Plon.
- Sfeir, Antoine; Andrau, René (2005). Liberté, égalité, islam. Tallandier.
- Sfeir, Antoine; Montenay, Yves (2005). La langue française face à la mondialisation. Les Belles Lettres.
- Sfeir, Antoine (2006). L'islam en 50 clés. Bayard.
- Sfeir, Antoine (2006). Vers l'Orient compliqué. Grasset.
- Sfeir, Antoine (2006). Tunisie, Terre de paradoxes. L'Archipel.
- Sfeir, Antoine; Bacharan, Nicole (2006). Américains-arabes.
- Sfeir, Antoine (2007). Brève histoire de l'islam à l'usage de tous. Bayard.
- Sfeir, Antoine (2007). Les Islamismes d'hier à aujourd'hui. Lignes de repères.
- Sfeir, Antoine (2007). Al-Qaïda menace la France. Le Cherche midi.
- Sfeir, Antoine; Klein, Théo (2008). Israël survivra-t-il ?. L'Archipel.
- Sfeir, Antoine (2008). Vers l'Orient compliqué (Pocket edition: Paris, Le Livre de Poche ed.). Grasset.
- Sfeir, Antoine; Bencheikh, Ghaleb (2008). Lettre ouverte aux islamistes. Bayard.
- Sfeir, Antoine (2009). Chrétiens d'Orient. Bayard.
- Sfeir, Antoine (2009). Dictionnaire géopolitique de l'islamisme. Bayard.
- Sfeir, Antoine; Chesnot, Christian (2009). Orient-Occident. Calmann-Lévy. p. 304. ISBN 978-2-7021-3970-7. OCLC 41414367.
- Sfeir, Antoine (2009). Brève histoire de l'islam à l'usage de tous. Bayard.
- Sfeir, Antoine (2011). Dictionnaire du Moyen-Orient. Bayard.
- Sfeir, Antoine (2012). L'Islam contre l'islam, l'interminable guerre des chiites et des sunnites. Paris: Grasset. ISBN 978-2-246-76401-4. OCLC 435147763.
