= Gran Sandy =

Bolivian-Argentine comedian (1937–2005)

El Gran Sandy
- Born: Alejandro Hangano Cassab; October 23, 1937; Santa Cruz de la Sierra, Bolivia
- Died: April 23, 2005 (aged 67); Buenos Aires, Argentina
- Other name: Sandy

Alejandro Hangano Cassab (October 23, 1937 – April 23, 2005), known by his stage name El Gran Sandy, was a Bolivian-Argentine comedian recognized for his mastery of light humor ("humor blanco"), for his skill as a polyglot and for his musical abilities. When he was 21 years old, he emigrated to Argentina, where he resided for almost five decades. He lived for many years in Puerto Madryn, Chubut, Argentina, before moving to Buenos Aires. He was much loved in Chile, where he performed on four occasions at the Viña del Mar International Song Festival, being honoured with the prized silver seagull "la Gaviota de Plata" in 2000 and the silver torch "la Antorcha de Plata" in 2004. In Bolivia, however, he was less well known. El Gran Sandy married twice. His first wife was Argentine and they had a son by the name of Arturo Alejandro, born in 1962. His second wife, Antonia Villalba, was Paraguayan. Argentine president Carlos Menem was godfather to el Gran Sandy's daughter, born in 1997.

== Early life and education ==
Sandy was born in Santa Cruz de la Sierra, Bolivia to a Romanian father (Alexandre Hangano), who was a fine arts painter and a Lebanese mother (Leila Cassab) who’s maternal uncle was (Archbishop Pietro Sfair). The doctor who assisted with the birth of el Gran Sandy was Melchor Pinto. Despite having ten children together, the marriage ended in divorce. Sandy's father moved to Chile. His mother made her life in Santa Cruz de la Sierra, Bolivia. The family was of limited financial means.

Sandy's great uncle was Emilio Sfeir, hero of Bolivian counter espionage during the Chaco War and friend to Hernan Siles Zuazo, whom he met when both were political prisoners in 1949 on the Isla de la Luna on Lake Titicaca.

Sandy went to high school at the Colegio Don Bosco (Salesian teaching order) in La Paz, Bolivia. Sandy's parents desired that Sandy pursue a career in engineering and architecture at the UMSA university in La Paz, but he did not have such vocation. He once said that he "looked around and saw that the city already had roads, bridges and buildings" and he wanted to do something that had not been done before.

== Career ==
Sandy was nearly 6 foot 4 inches tall and had an athletic build, personal characteristics that helped him get his first job, at age 19, as a personal body guard and motorcycle escort for Hernan Siles Zuazo, Bolivian president from 1956 to 1960.

Sandy's show business career began in 1957, first as a musician and singer, next as a ventriloquist, and finally as a master of ceremonies and comedian. In 1958 he performed for the first time outside of Bolivia, in Corumba, Brazil. He moved to Argentina in 1958. His greatest successes as a comedian did not come until the 1990s, when he presented his act in various countries in Latin America and in Miami, attaining his greatest success and public admiration in Chile.

Sandy's repertoire included a number of jokes involving Gallicians (immigrants from Spain), Mexicans, Cubans, Chileans, Jews, Germans, Italians, Levantines ("turcos"), Japanese, Russians, Brazilians, Argentines and Paraguayans. In these jokes, Sandy expertly imitated the accents and manner of speech of each group. However, he did not make any jokes about Bolivians. Other jokes he told had as protagonists Catholic priests and some of those jokes were told to him by the Salesian priests of his high school Colegio Don Bosco. In addition, Sandy was known for his jokes involving stutterers and people with speech impediments (two examples: his classic joke about "la jañaña" set in a pharmacy and his joke about visiting the White House looking for President Bill Clinton)--with the passage of time these jokes fell out of favour and, today, they would be considered politically incorrect. His most famous joke, which has aged well, is about the Latin American tourist who meets a Spanish taxi driver in Helsinki, Finland. Another routine that Sandy had was his ability to sing popular songs famous in Cuba, Mexico, Brazil, Chile, Spain, Italy, the USA and Israel in their respective languages. He won the affection of the Chilean public at Viña del Mar by playing on the harmonica the iconic song "si vas para Chile" ("should you travel to Chile")

In February 2004, Sandy performed for the fourth and final time at the Viña del Mar International Song Festival, where he was honored for his lifetime achievement with the coveted Silver Torch or "Antorcha de Plata". One of Sandy's last performances was in his native Santa Cruz de la Sierra, at the XXIX Feria Exposición de Santa Cruz ("Expocruz") on September 22, 2004. On such occasion, Sandy said "to Santa Cruz I offer as a gift my wholeheartedness and my joy; when people laugh, that gives me joy and motivation to continue striving, it is a kind of personal nourishment for me."

Luis Slimming paid homage to Sandy in his act at Viña del Mar in February 2024.

== Health ==
The diabetes that he inherited from his mother began complicating his life and health to the point that both of his legs had to be amputated.

At his nadir, Sandy was discovered by an astonished Chilean photographer looking forlorn and selling small items on the streets of Buenos Aires. He was emaciated and his legs had been amputated. As a consequence, in February 2004, the Chilean morning TV show of Canal 13, Viva la mañana, began a fund raising campaign for him that resulted in an outpouring of assistance from show business personalities and also from his friends Cecilia Bolocco and Carlos Menem. This outpouring of love and support motivated Sandy to express his desire to move his residence from Buenos Aires to Chile and to request Chilean citizenship.

He died on April 23, 2005, from a heart attack caused by complications of advanced diabetes at his residence in the Balvanera neighbourhood of Buenos Aires.

== Prizes and honours ==
- Gaviota de Plata, 2000
- Antorcha de Plata, 2004
