= Clodualdo del Mundo =

Clodualdo del Mundo may refer to:

- Clodualdo del Mundo, Sr. (1911-1977), Filipino writer of literature and popular books and comics
- Clodualdo del Mundo, Jr. (born 1948), Filipino film director, producer and screenwriter
