= Annelise Barron =

American bioengineer scientist

Annelise Barron (born 1968) is an American scientist of Bolivian heritage, currently an associate professor of bioengineering at Stanford University who focuses on the study of the human body's innate immune defenses against pathogens. In 2007 she was named the W. M. Keck Associate Professor of Bioengineering.

== Early life ==
Barron was born in 1968 in Milwaukee to a Wisconsin woman of Swedish and English heritage and a Bolivian immigrant father who had come to the United States at age 21. Her parents divorced when Barron was 2 and her mother remarried. When she was 5 years old, the family moved to Fairbanks, Alaska. Her stepfather worked on the Alaskan pipeline. She has nine siblings. Her high school chemistry teacher in Bellevue, Washington, inspired her to pursue a career in chemical engineering. Neither of her parents had attended college.

== Education ==
Barron graduated cum laude in chemical engineering from the University of Washington in 1990. She earned a Ph.D. in 1995 at the University of California, Berkeley, in Chemical engineering.

== Career ==
Prior to her appointment as an Associate Professor of Bioengineering at Stanford University, Barron was an Assistant Professor of Chemical Engineering at Northwestern University, where she blended chemistry and biophysics to create synthetic molecules for practical applications in biotechnology and medicine, including DNA sequencing.

== Research ==
Barron's research includes an investigation into the use of Cannabis (drug) to reduce addiction to heroin, and developing a method to make an artificial Surfactant that could benefit people whose lungs have been damaged.

== Awards and honors ==
In 1999 Barron was awarded a Presidential Early Career Award for Scientists and Engineers (PECASE).

== Selected publications ==
- Kirshenbaum, Kent; Barron, Annelise E.; Goldsmith, Richard A.; Armand, Philippe; Bradley, Erin K.; Truong, Kiet T. V.; Dill, Ken A.; Cohen, Fred E.; Zuckermann, Ronald N. (1998-04-14). "Sequence-specific polypeptoids: A diverse family of heteropolymers with stable secondary structure". Proceedings of the National Academy of Sciences. 95 (8): 4303–4308. doi:10.1073/pnas.95.8.4303. ISSN 0027-8424. PMC 22484. PMID 9539732.
- Chongsiriwatana, Nathaniel P.; Patch, James A.; Czyzewski, Ann M.; Dohm, Michelle T.; Ivankin, Andrey; Gidalevitz, David; Zuckermann, Ronald N.; Barron, Annelise E. (2008-02-26). "Peptoids that mimic the structure, function, and mechanism of helical antimicrobial peptides". Proceedings of the National Academy of Sciences. 105 (8): 2794–2799. doi:10.1073/pnas.0708254105. ISSN 0027-8424. PMC 2268539. PMID 18287037.
