= Chris Syler =

- Born: August 29, 1986 (age 39); Brenham, Texas
- Origin: Bolivia
- Genres: Pop, Latin pop
- Instrument(s): Vocals, Acoustic guitar
- Years active: 2007-Present
- Labels: La Soga Records, Imperio Music

Christopher Sean Syler (born August 29, 1986) is an American-born singer-songwriter, composer and television personality. He began writing his original music since 2007.

== Life and career ==
Syler was born in Brenham, Texas to an American father and a Bolivian mother. Chris moved to Santa Cruz, Bolivia in his early years. His parents enrolled him in a singing group. At age 15, Chris chose the guitar as his favorite instrument. Later he forms his first group in the punk-rock style. Shortly, the band broke up, which allowed Syler to pursue a solo career. In September 2007, Chris moved to Miami Beach and continued his work as a composer, working with many other composers in the Latin market such as: Erika Ender, Wise (composer), Juan Carlos Perez Soto, Samo (Camila), Sebastian de Peyrecave, Yasmil Marrufo, Mauricio Gasca, Rafael Esparza, among others; Chris manages to increase his catalog as a composer reaching close to 500 songs until 2022.

Syler is also a member of SESAC LATINA.

Currently, Chris is signed to La Soga Records and Imperio Music. His musical influences ranges from John Mayer, Dashboard Confessional and Juanes, Camila. Syler is also a judge on the Bolivian version of The X Factor. His music is available on Spotify.

== Discography ==
- Real - 2010
- Que No Se Quede Atrás, Vol. 1 - 2011
- Que No Se Quede Atrás, Vol. 2 - 2011
- Sesion - 2014
- Soy (Reloaded) - 2014
- Pequeño Show en la Gran Ciudad - 2014
- El Año Perdido - 2014
- Orgánico - 2015
- El Fantasma de Algo Bello - 2015
- La Hora - 2017
