= Markita del Carpio Landry =

Bolivian-American chemist

Markita Landry
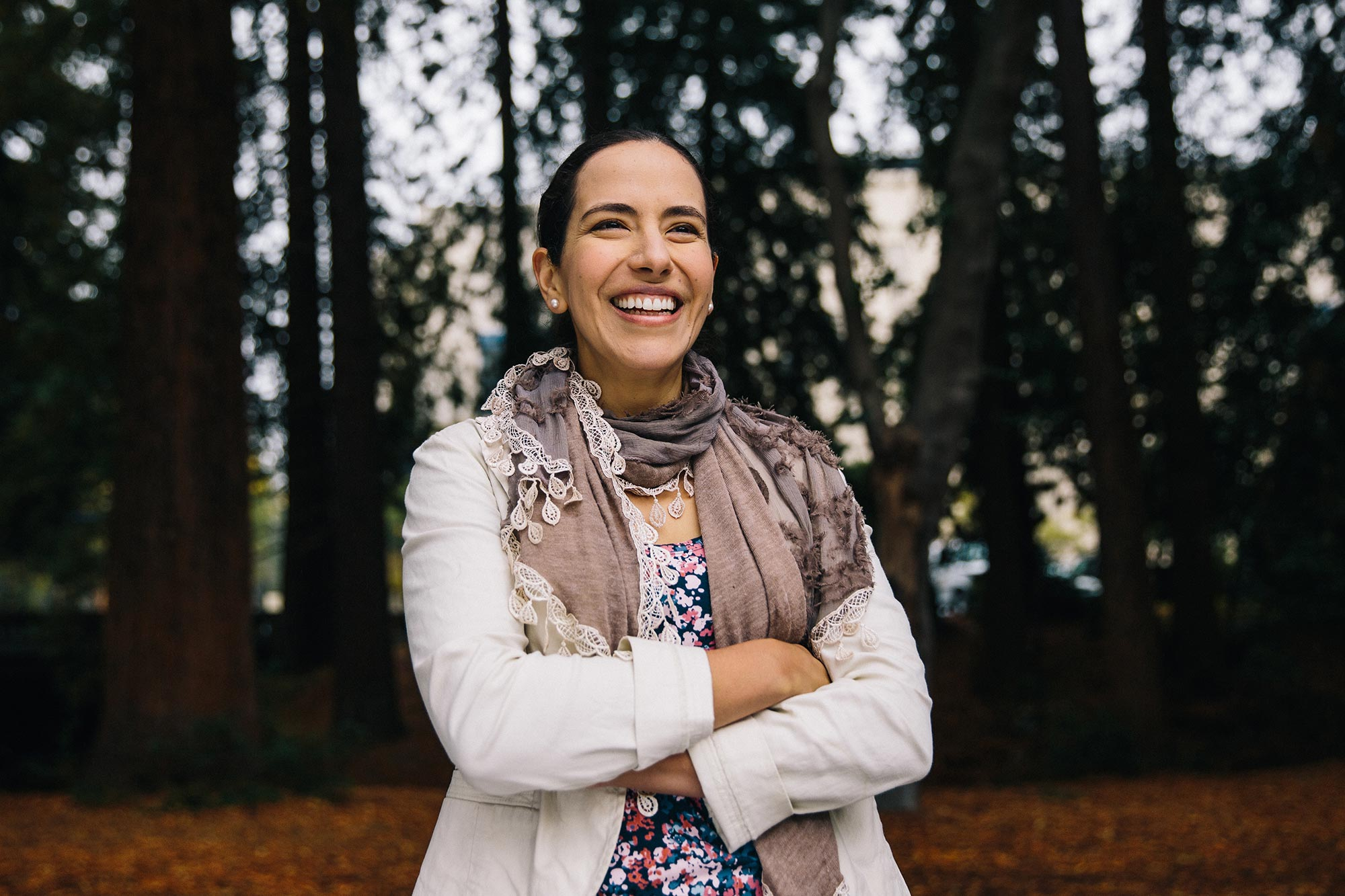
- Education: University of North Carolina at Chapel Hill; University of Illinois at Urbana-Champaign
- Scientific career
- Workplaces: Massachusetts Institute of Technology; Osaka University; Duke University; University of North Carolina at Chapel Hill
- Thesis: Single-molecule methods for an improved understanding of biophysical interactions: from fundamental biology to applied nanotechnology. (2012)
- Website: Landry Lab

Markita del Carpio Landry is a Bolivian-American chemist who is an associate professor in the department of chemical engineering at the University of California, Berkeley. Her research considers nanomaterials for brain imaging and the development of sustainable crops. She was a recipient of the 2022 Vilcek prize for creative promise. del Carpio Landry's work has been featured on NPR, popular mechanics, the San Francisco Chronicle, and C&E News.

== Early life and education ==
Del Carpio Landry's parents are both teachers, and she has said that her early training was in curiosity-based science. Landry earned her bachelor's degrees at the University of North Carolina at Chapel Hill, where she majored in both chemistry and physics. She moved to the University of Illinois Urbana-Champaign for doctoral studies and earned a Ph.D. in chemical physics. Her research considered the development of single-molecule spectroscopies for investigating DNA polymer oxidative damage. del Carpio Landry was a National Science Foundation postdoctoral scholar at the Massachusetts Institute of Technology. She performed research at both the Technical University of Munich and Osaka University. del Carpio Landry is a fluent speaker of French, English, and Spanish.

== Research and career ==
In July 2016, del Carpio Landry was appointed to the faculty at Berkeley, where she started to explore nanotechnology-based approaches to image neuromodulation in the brain using synthetic nanoparticle-polymer conjugates. Such materials are incredibly versatile, with tunable chemical and physical properties. They can be processed using low cost fabrication techniques, permitting the creation of biomimetic structures. She uses functionalized carbon nanotubes to detect the neurotransmitters dopamine and norepinephrine with high spatial and temporal resolution. She simultaneously develops near-infrared fluorescent probes to explore fundamental biological processes.

Del Carpio Landry has also demonstrated that carbon nanotubes can be used to deliver DNA into plant cells with applications in plant genome editing. Delivering DNA to plants is complicated due to the rigid, multi-layer cell walls, yet del Carpio Landry has also demonstrated that nanoparticles can be used to deliver RNA into plants. During the COVID-19 pandemic, del Carpio Landry started to explore nanosensors for detecting the spike proteins of severe acute respiratory syndrome coronavirus 2 (SARS-CoV-2) and to increase the sensitivity of RT-qPCR detection of SARS-CoV-2 infections.

== Awards and honors ==
- 2017 Frontiers of Engineering Symposium
- 2017 Chan-Zuckerberg Biohub
- 2018 International Union of Pure and Applied Chemistry World Leading Chemist
- 2018 Howard Hughes Medical Institute Gilliam Fellowship
- 2018 Sloan Research Fellowship
- 2018 Burroughs Wellcome Fund
- 2019 Frontiers of Science Alumni
- 2019 Chemical & Engineering News Talented 12
- 2019 Prytanean Faculty Award
- 2019 DARPA Young Investigator Award
- 2020 University of Illinois Urbana-Champaign Young Alumni Award
- 2020 Emerging Leader in Molecular Spectroscopy Award
- 2020 Cell Press 100 Most Inspiring Hispanic/Latinx Scientists in America
- 2021 Nature Estée Lauder Research Awards for Inspiring Women in Science
- 2021 National Science Foundation CAREER Award
- 2021 Dreyfus Foundation Teacher Scholar Award
- 2022 Vilcek Prize for Creative Promise in Biomedical Science
- 2022 Chan-Zuckerberg Biohub
- 2023 Schmidt Science Polymath Awardee
- 2025 Guggenheim Fellowship Awardee

== Selected publications ==
- Ouassil, N.*, Pinals, R.L.*, O'Donnell, J.T.D., Wang, J., Landry, M.P.‡ Supervised Learning Model to Predict Protein Adsorption to Nanoparticles. Science Advances (2022)
- Zhang, H.*, Goh, N.S.*, Wang, J., Demirer, G.S., Butrus, S., Park, S-J, Landry, M.P.‡ Nanoparticle Cellular Internalization is Not Required for RNA Delivery to Mature Plant Leaves. Nature Nanotechnology (2021)
- Demirer, G.S., Zhang, H., Goh, N.S., Chang, R., Landry, M.P.‡ Carbon nanocarriers deliver siRNA to intact plant cells for efficient gene knockdown. Science Advances (2020). 6 (26)
- Jeong, S., Yang, D., Beyene, A.G., O'Donnell, J.T.D., Gest, A. M., Navarro, N., Sun, X., Landry, M.P.‡ High Throughput Evolution of Near Infrared Serotonin Nanosensors. Science Advances (2019). 5 (12), 1-12
- Beyene, A. G., Delevich, K., O'Donnell, J.T.D., Piekarski, D.J., Lin, W.C., Thomas, A.W., Yang, S.J., Kosillo, P., Yang, D., Wilbrecht, L., Landry, M.P.‡ Imaging Striatal Dopamine Release Using a Non-Genetically Encoded Near-Infrared Fluorescent Catecholamine Nanosensor. Science Advances (2019). 5 (7), 1-11
- Demirer, G.S., Zhang, H., Matos, J., Goh, N., Cunningham, F.J., Sung, Y., Chang, R., Aditham, A.J., Chio, L., Cho, M.J., Staskawicz, B., Landry, M.P.‡ High Aspect Ratio Nanomaterials Enable Delivery of Functional Genetic Material Without DNA Integration in Mature Plants. Nature Nanotechnology (2019). 14, 456-464
- Zhang, H.*, Demirer, G.S.*, Zhang, H., Ye, T., Goh, N.S., Aditham, A.J., Cunningham, F.J., Fan, C., Landry, M.P.‡ Low-dimensional DNA Nanostructures Coordinate Gene Silencing in Mature Plants. PNAS (2019). 116 (15), 7543-7548
