= Luis Morato =

Bolivian Quechua scholar

Luis Morató
- Born: Cochabamba, Bolivia
- Occupations: Scholar, writer
- Writing career
- Language: Quechua, Spanish
- Years active: 1980–present
- Genre: Linguistics
- Notable work: Quechua qosqo-qollaw (1995)
- Notable awards: Quechua Award for Lifetime Achievement

Luis Morató is a Bolivian scholar, author and former Quechua professor at Cornell University.

== Education and career ==
Morató was born in Cochabamba, Bolivia. He studied Law, Linguistics, and Journalism at the University of San Simón. While living in his hometown he was a pioneer on broadcasting Quechua programs at radio stations. He founded the "Instituto de Idiomas Tawantinsuyu", which taught Bolivian and Peruvian Quechua, Aymara and Spanish.

For many decades Morató dedicated his time to the research and teaching of Quechua and Spanish. In Bolivia and Perú he was a professor of Quechua and Andean Culture at his alma mater, Maryknoll Language Program, French Alliance, Centro Pedagógico Portales, the South Andean Pastoral Institute (Cuzco, Peru).

In the United States Morató taught at the University of Illinois at Urbana-Champaign, the University of Chicago, the University of Texas at Austin, and for many years at Cornell University. In 2016 he retired from teaching Spanish and Quechua at Ohio State University in Columbus.

== Awards and honors ==
Professor Morató received the Quechua Award for Lifetime Achievement by The Quechua Alliance in 2019.

== Works ==
- Guía médica trilingüe : queshwa-english-castellano (1994)
- Quechua qosqo-qollaw (1995), trilingual Quechua textbook
- Cóndores de amor y muerte (2000)
