= Eduardo Gamarra =

Eduardo Gamarra is an American political scientist of Bolivian heritage who focuses his research, teaching and public outreach on the politics of the Hispanic population in the United States and the politics of Bolivia, Cuba, Haiti and Venezuela.

== Early life and education ==
Gamarra was born in 1957 and grew up in La Paz, Bolivia where he attended the American Cooperative School of La Paz. He obtained his B.A. degree in 1979 and his M.A. degree in 1980, both from the University of Arkansas. He obtained his PhD in Political Science in 1987 from the University of Pittsburgh, where his mentor was Andean expert James M. Malloy.

== Career ==
Gamarra is a tenured full professor of political science at Florida International University Steven J. Green School of International and Public Affairs, where he is an expert on Latino vote in the United States and appears frequently on television in the United States as an expert on the politics of Bolivia, Cuba, Haiti and Venezuela. Gamarra has also testified before the US Senate Foreign Affairs Committee. Gamarra also serves on the Board of Directors of the Bolivian-American Chamber of Commerce.

Gamarra served as the director from 1994 to 2007 of the Latin American and Caribbean Center at Florida International University, where Gamarra co-founded and edited "Hemisphere." a magazine dedicateed to regional affairs.

== Key publications ==
- "Revolution and Reaction: Bolivia 1964-1985 (co-authored with James M. Malloy)
- "Latin American Political Economy in the Age of Neoliberal Reform"
- "Democracy, Markets, and Structural Reform in Latin America"
- "Strategic Culture in the Americas" (co-authored with Brian Fonseca)
