= Walter Gonzalez (engineer) =

Bolivian civil and structural engineer (1924–1979)

- Born: 1 June 1924; Cochabamba, Bolivia
- Died: October 17, 1979 (aged 55); Urbana, Illinois, U.S.
- Education: Universidad Mayor de San Andrés; University of Illinois at Urbana-Champaign
- Occupations: Civil engineer, professor
- Spouse: Nelly Esther Sfeir de Gonzalez
- Children: Walter Ramiro Gonzalez Sfeir, MD; Jorge Mauricio Gonzalez Sfeir, MBA; Jose Javier Gonzalez Sfeir, JD; Luis Fernando Gonzalez Sfeir, MD; Sergio Antonio Gonzalez Sfeir, CPA
- Awards: Premio Vicente Burgaleta; Orquesta Sinfonica Nacional de Bolivia; Fulbright Scholar; Premio Ingeniero Walter Gonzalez a la Excelencia Académica

Walter González González (June 1, 1924 – October 17, 1979) was a Bolivian civil and structural engineer. He was the first Fulbright Scholar from Bolivia. He was president of the Society of Bolivian Engineers (Sociedad de Ingenieros de Bolivia), a Dean of the school of civil engineering at the Universidad Mayor de San Andres in La Paz, Bolivia, and Chief of the Alto Beni Development Project. The National Geographic Society has honored him with membership in its Cartographer's Circle in recognition of his work in the Amazon basin.

== Early life in Bolivia ==
Walter González González (sometimes rendered Walter Gonzales Gonzales) was born in Cochabamba, Bolivia, on June 1, 1924, the oldest of five children of Walter Gonzales Mendez and Mercedes Gonzales. Gonzalez's siblings were Antonia (a school teacher), Ruben (a medical doctor), Juan and Jorge (the latter two civil engineers). Gonzalez's father was a pianist, ensemble leader and music teacher. He was also a folk artist. Gonzalez's mother's family owned a landed estate in Lobo Rancho, Cochabamba prior to the Bolivian National Revolution of 1952, which promulgated the expropriation of landed estates. As a young boy during summer vacations at the estate, Gonzalez learned Quechua from the children of the local peasant farmers. As an adult, Gonzalez always expressed support for the land reform enacted by the Bolivian National Revolution even though such reform had diminished the family's net worth.

Walter Gonzalez attended Colegio Bolivar, a public school, in his hometown of Cochabamba. A childhood friend who was an important role model for Gonzalez was Renato Cespedes (father of Colombian electrical engineer Renato Cespedes Gandarillas), who first planted the idea of becoming an engineer. At a society party one evening, where the two teenagers were performing as musicians in the orchestra (Gonzalez on violin and Cespedes on accordion), Cespedes pointed out Alfredo Galindo Quiroga, a distinguished gentleman, and indicated "he is an engineer and is working on the construction of the reservoir dam at La Angostura--I want to be like him." During one high school summer vacation, Gonzalez and a friend went on a camping/bicycling trip across the Bolivian altiplano from Cochabamba to Tiwanaku to visit the archaeological site and admire the megalithic stonework--this was a prelude to a career as a structural engineer. To their amazement, along the way they encountered the elusive "jucumari" or Andean spectacled bear.

From an early age, Gonzalez's father taught him to play the violin. He attended the local Conservatory for additional instruction. Gonzalez's father was a friend of Eduardo Laredo, father of violinist Jaime Laredo. In 1952, Gonzalez performed with the Bolivian National Youth Symphony Orchestra conducted by Jaime Mendoza-Nava. As a young man, Walter Gonzalez was offered a scholarship to the Juilliard School, which he declined, preferring instead to study civil engineering at the Universidad Mayor de San Andres (UMSA) in La Paz, Bolivia. During his university days in La Paz, Gonzalez was able to support himself (room and board, clothing, academic books and supplies) from his earnings from playing the violin in carnaval season orchestras. Gonzalez's father had also taught him to draw and paint as a child. These skills would prove to be beneficial to Gonzalez in university coursework requiring draftsmanship and, later, in building a photo library of his experiences in the Alto Beni.

At UMSA, classmates Jorge Arevalo Gapnor, Oscar Rios, Jose Luis Ossio, Oscar Tapias, and Armando Murillo (father of ophthalmologist Gonzalo Murillo Azcarraga) became friends for life. Gonzalez received his Civil Engineer degree on December 31, 1952. His diploma was signed by Dr. Victor Paz Estenssoro, the president of Bolivia. As the top student in his graduating class, Walter Gonzalez was awarded, on August 29, 1952, the inaugural Premio Vicente Burgaleta, named after the Spanish-born founder and first dean of the Universidad Mayor de San Andres (UMSA) school of engineering. The award was poignant for two additional reasons: (1) Burgaleta had been Gonzalez's mentor during his university days, and (2) Burgaleta had died earlier in 1952. The master of ceremonies for awarding the prize was the dean of the school of engineering, Hugo Mancilla Romero, who would have a close professional relationship with Gonzalez during two decades.

Gonzalez performed his military service in the Bolivian Army's La Paz General Headquarters from 1953 to 1955, being discharged with the rank of Honorary Second Lieutenant. His military service included basic training as a rifleman; however, his primary military duties were to teach civil engineering at the Escuela Militar de Ingenieria. One of his most distinguished students at EMI was Juan Jose Torres, a future general and president of Bolivia.

In 1954, Gonzalez received a faculty appointment as the professor of Projective Geometry at the Universidad Mayor de San Andres school of engineering. Concurrent with his academic and military duties, Gonzalez also worked at the Empresa Constructora Rafael Gisbert construction company from 1950 to 1955, being responsible for the calculations for reinforced concrete in the building projects.

In 1955, Walter Gonzalez was awarded a Fulbright Scholarship to study at the University of Illinois at Urbana-Champaign. He earned a M.S. in Civil Engineering on August 13, 1956 and thereafter pursued advanced coursework in structural engineering. In September 1958, Gonzalez represented the Society of Bolivian Engineers as a delegate to the Pan American Federation of Engineering Societies held in Montreal, Canada. From December 1956 to June 1959, Gonzalez worked part time at the engineering firm Clark, Dietz & Associates in Urbana, Illinois.

Gonzalez returned to Bolivia in 1959, just in time to witness the euphoric and multitudinary homecoming that Jaime Laredo received in La Paz for winning the Queen Elisabeth Competition musical prize. In 1960, Gonzalez received a faculty appointment as the professor of Structures and Pre-stressed Concrete at the Universidad Mayor de San Andres school of engineering. In August 1963 Gonzalez was appointed Deputy Dean of the School of Civil Engineering, continuing a fruitful collaboration with Dean Hugo Mancilla Romero. In 1966, Gonzalez was appointed Dean of the Institute of Basic Sciences of the Universidad Mayor de San Andres. He continued teaching at UMSA until 1967. In his opinion, as recorded in a personal notebook, his most outstanding students were Hugo Belmonte, Julio Ponce, Andres Petricevic, Fily Estrada, Orestes Rosuce, Jose Luis Vega, Miguel Catacora, Jaime del Llano, Mariano Quispe, Alcides Reguerin, Edgar Pozo, and Abdon Calderon. Gonzalez was a just but demanding professor, earning the nickname among students of "el Tigre" (the Tiger).

Except for the period 1966-1967, Gonzalez's employment at UMSA was on a part time basis. Parallel to his academic activities, Gonzalez was working full time at the Corporacion Boliviana de Fomento from 1959 to 1965. It was an intense time for Gonzalez. He would spend many weekends during the academic year, and whole weeks during academic recesses, traveling to inspect infrastructure projects in Santa Cruz, Cochabamba, and—most notably—Alto Beni.

== Marriage and family ==
Walter Gonzalez married Nelly Esther Sfeir Cabero in January 1953 at La Paz, Bolivia. At the civil wedding ceremony, Hugo Mancilla Romero, Dean of the UMSA school of engineering, was one of his witnesses. One witness for his wife was Manuel Barrau Pelaez, a future Foreign Minister and Bolivian ambassador to the United Kingdom and the United States (see Embassy of Bolivia, Washington, D.C.). The Roman Catholic religious wedding ceremony was held at the Chapel of Colegio La Salle on Loayza Street in La Paz.

The couple had five sons. Two were medical doctors, one an MBA, one a lawyer, and one a CPA. The family emigrated to the United States in 1967, making their home in Urbana, Illinois. His wife Nelly Sfeir Gonzalez was a university librarian, award-winning bibliographer, president of the Seminar on the Acquisition of Latin American Library Materials, and founding editor of the Bolivian Studies Journal. Son Mauricio Gonzalez Sfeir, a graduate of Harvard Business School, served as Secretary of Energy of Bolivia. Son Javier Gonzalez-Sfeir, a graduate of Harvard Law School, served on the Board of Directors of the Bolivian American Chamber of Commerce. Granddaughter Dr. Andrea Gonzalez-Karpovics was honored as the "2021 Resident of the Year" by the Hispanic National Medical Association. Grandson Xavier Gonzalez, a mathematician and computational neuroscientist, was the first Bolivian American Rhodes Scholar.

In middle age, Walter Gonzalez resumed playing the violin in public. His signature piece was Mozart's "Eine Kleine Nachtmusik." Gonzalez was first violinist for the Champaign-Urbana Civic Symphony Orchestra in the 1970s. Also in middle age, he took up bicycling again, first to accompany his youngest son on charity bike rides and later to try to salvage his failing health.

== Career highlights ==
In 1959, upon his return from post graduate studies in the United States, Gonzalez was hired as chief engineer by the Corporacion Boliviana de Fomento. Among his primary projects from 1959 to 1961 were the asphalting of the road from Cochabamba to Santa Cruz, building of irrigation infrastructure at Villamontes, construction of roads to the north of Santa Cruz, and the building of the roads from Licoma to Canhamina and from Caranavi to Santa Ana. From 1961 to 1963, Gonzalez served as the Chief of the Alto Beni Development Project (a joint venture between the Alliance for Progress and the Corporacion Boliviana de Fomento), leading a team that built the first roads that connected Bolivia's capital city of La Paz to the sparsely populated tropical plains of the Alto Beni region (for example, the roads from Caranavi to Santa Ana de Mosetenes and from Santa Ana to Mayaya and Santa Ana to Covendo). These roads cut through thick virgin forest and the initial trail blazing was conducted on muleback by Gonzalez, with the assistance of local rancher Federico Elena (father of cardiologist Federico Elena Lenz) and Bolivian army lieutenant Julio Trigo and his platoon of machete-wielding conscripts. For some of the way they uncovered what remained of the long-abandoned Jesuit cattle path from the 18th century. During their trek, they had to be wary of boa constrictors and jaguars on land and caimans and piranha fish in the rivers. The biggest annoyance, however, came from the air—mosquitoes.

In a letter dated August 1, 1961 to the Clark, Daily & Dietz firm of consulting engineers in Urbana, Illinois, Adolfo Linares Arraya, president of the Corporacion Boliviana de Fomento, described Gonzalez's duties as follows:

Mr. Gonzalez is directing and supervising the work for the integral development of the Alto Beni Valley. This work can be fundamentally described as the migration of colonists from the densely populated Bolivian highlands of the Altiplano to the tropical areas which are now becoming available for colonization. Mr. Gonzalez's responsibilities in this project embrace all aspects with the planning, management, and execution of such works as road design and construction of penetration and access roads, camp construction, urban and rural site location, sanitation, selection of prospective settlers, pre-colonization, etc.

Fulfilling his duties for the Alto Beni Development Project, Gonzalez also directed the construction of the staging encampment, the Caranavi Hospital, the airplane landing strip at Santa Ana, numerous schools and clinics and other infrastructure. The Second Battalion of Military Engineers of the Bolivian Armed Forces was enlisted in these projects. Furthermore, Gonzalez was responsible for promoting the colonization of the area with several thousand settlers from the altiplano and establishing centers for agricultural production and the fishery at Piquendo. Under his responsibility, he enlisted the assistance of USAID and Major Lavern "Gerry" Borg, a US Army public health specialist, to eradicate the "mal de pinto" (Pinta (disease), a venereal disease that causes the skin of those infected to turn blue) affecting one group of local tribesmen. The cure was accomplished by injecting a high dose of penicillin. In another anecdote, reported by National Geographic magazine, the planned route for a road in the Alto Beni came upon a very large and majestic mahogany tree—Gonzalez ordered the road to be re-routed so as to preserve the tree. In October 1963, Gonzalez was promoted to Chief of Engineering for the Colonization Project of the Corporacion Boliviana de Fomento working jointly with the Banco Interamericano de Desarrollo (Interamerican Development Bank). Once during these times, Gonzalez was accused of being a Communist by a USAID civilian administrator, which charge was refuted categorically by Colonel Edward Fox, the US Air Force Attaché in Bolivia and a neighbor, who stated: "I see him in church every Sunday morning with his family." On June 18, 2026, as part of the festivities celebrating the inauguration of its new Museum of Exploration, The National Geographic Society gave posthumous recognition to Gonzalez for his pioneering work in the Bolivian Alto Beni by including him in its Cartographer's Circle, "honoring the National Geographic Society's iconic legacy of geography and mapmaking, in celebration of the opening of the Museum of Exploration."

By letter dated October 13, 1964, Gonzalez received a formal joint invitation from Ramiro Paz Cerruto, son of President Victor Paz Estenssoro, Hugo Antezana and Eduardo Monrroy-Block to join the Movimiento Nacionalista Revolucionario (MNR) political party; Gonzalez politely declined preferring to remain an apolitical technocrat. In contrast, the president of the Corporacion Boliviana de Fomento, Adolfo Linares Arraya accepted the invitation to become an MNR party member and promptly joined the cabinet of President Victor Paz Estenssoro. Only three weeks later, however, President Victor Paz Estenssoro was deposed in a coup d'etat by his own vice president, General Rene Barrientos--1964 Bolivian coup d'état. In August 1965, Gonzalez represented Bolivia at the Meeting of Latin American Governments Members of the Congreso Interamericano de Migraciones Internas in Montevideo, Uruguay. This meeting dealt with issues of human migration.

In 1965, Gonzalez's employment with the Corporacion Boliviana de Fomento came to an end when the work of the CBF/IDB Colonization Project was restructured and absorbed into the Instituto Nacional de Colonizacion y Desarrollo de Comunidades Rurales pursuant to Supreme Decree No. 7226 dated 28 June 1965. During his years at the Corporacion Boliviana de Fomento, Gonzalez forged strong friendships with Adolfo Linares Arraya (later, the founder and first president of the CAF—Corporacion Andina de Fomento, a Latin American development bank), and Colonel Julio Sanjines Goytia (architect of transforming the Escuela Militar de Ingenieria into an open- access engineering university in 1980 and successor to Linares as president of the CAF). In addition, Gonzalez developed excellent professional mentoring relationships with several young members of his team, including Oscar Arze Quintanilla (project sociologist for the Alto Beni project, later the Director of the Instituto Indigenista Interamericano and Bolivian ambassador to Mexico) and Hernan Zeballos Hurtado, an economist specializing in agronomy. On the social front, in 1965 Gonzalez and his wife hired a young Carlos Palenque, then part of the troubadour duo "Los Dos Caminantes," to perform at a going-away party for Major Borg.

Walter Gonzalez served as president of the Society of Bolivian Engineers (Sociedad de Ingenieros de Bolivia) in 1965–1966. In July 1966, Gonzalez served as an electoral court judge for the 1966 Bolivian general election, which was won by the Rene Barrientos/Luis Adolfo Siles ticket. Following the election, Gonzalez was offered a subcabinet appointment in the Ministry of Transportation. He declined, preferring academia to politics. From 1966 to 1967, Gonzalez served as Dean of the School of Engineering at the Universidad Mayor de San Andres. During this time, he was a close ally and supporter of Hugo Mancilla Romero, now the Rector of the Universidad Mayor de San Andres. Gonzalez also taught civil engineering at the Escuela Militar de Ingenieria (Bolivian military engineering school).

== Encounter with Tania, Che Guevara's Sleeper Spy in Bolivia ==
During his graduate studies at the University of Illinois at Urbana-Champaign in 1956-1959, Gonzalez was advised to study German in order to attain proficiency sufficient to read the scientific literature in that language. He struggled mightily learning German. Consequently, he vowed to make sure that his children would be instructed in German for possible future careers in science (a personal project he advanced in 1970 by enrolling his three oldest sons in an intensive summer German language program at the Institut auf dem Rosenberg in St. Gallen, Switzerland).

Thus, when his wife Nelly Sfeir Gonzalez read a note in the classified section of a La Paz newspaper in early 1965 advertising private German lessons, he welcomed the opportunity. He gave his wife approval to hire Senorita Laura Gutierrez Bauer, who presented herself as a German-Argentine, for German language classes for their two oldest sons. The instruction was given at the Gonzalez home in Calacoto, a southern residential district of the City of La Paz. Mrs. Gonzalez thought that Miss Gutierrez Bauer was a charismatic and highly skilled teacher, who had the latest in miniature tape recording equipment and educational materials, such as the Kinderduden picture books. After each teaching session, she would politely request the use of the Gonzalez telephone to make a number of phone calls. So impressed was Mrs. Gonzalez with Miss Gutierrez Bauer, and fearing that she might lose interest in teaching German to the Gonzalez children because of Miss Gutierrez Bauer's long commute from the city center to the southern district, Mrs. Gonzalez recommended Miss Gutierrez Bauer to a neighbor who also had school-aged children, Colonel Edward Fox, the US Air Force attaché in Bolivia. After more than one year of giving German classes to the Gonzalez children, Miss Gutierrez Bauer notified Mrs. Gonzalez that she would not be able to continue with the language instruction as she was about to embark on an extended trip to the Bolivian country side to research Bolivian folk music. Only in September 1967 did Gonzalez and his wife learn that Miss Gutierrez Bauer was "Tania," a sleeper spy of the Che Guevara urban intelligence network in La Paz during Che's Bolivian Campaign. Tania was her nome de guerre. Her real name was Tamara Bunke. She died of gunfire on August 31, 1967 in an ambush as her guerrilla column attempted to ford a tributary of the Rio Grande river in eastern Bolivia. Subsequently, it was revealed that Colonel Edward Fox was the top CIA agent in Bolivia during the 1960s.

== Return to the United States ==
In 1967, disenchanted with the military takeover of most Bolivian government agencies that began in June 1965 with the co-presidency of General Alfredo Ovando Candia, Gonzalez decided to return to the United States. With heavy heart, Gonzalez turned down an invitation from Adolfo Linares to join his engineering construction firm. This was a fateful decision, as the City of La Paz was on the cusp of a 1970s boom in the construction of high-rise buildings.

On July 2, 1968, Gonzalez became a Registered Structural Engineer under the laws of the State of Illinois. He worked as a senior structural engineer at Clark, Dietz & Associates in Urbana, Illinois from 1967 to 1979. Included among his many projects in Illinois was the 1975 structural investigation of the Gallatin County Courthouse Building in Shawneetown, Illinois. Early in 1969, Luis Adolfo Siles Salinas, vice-president of Bolivia, visited Gonzalez in Urbana, Illinois, presumably to discuss the scheduled 1970 Bolivian general election. In April 1969, Siles became president of Bolivia following the death of President Barrientos in a helicopter crash. Siles, himself, was deposed by General Alfredo Ovando Candia in a coup d'état in September 1969. General Ovando Candia cancelled the 1970 general election and ruled as a military dictator.

In 1970, on a tour of Europe with his three oldest sons, while in Rome Gonzalez visited the Maronite Catholic Titular Archbishop of Nisibis the Most Reverend Pietro Sfair, older brother of Gonzalez's father-in-law Emilio Sfeir. In 1974, ever nostalgic for his homeland, Gonzalez took a short leave of absence from Clark, Dietz & Associates to work with the engineering consulting firm Prudencio Claros in La Paz, Bolivia. Ultimately, Gonzalez chose to return to the United States, postponing plans to return to Bolivia until he could reach early retirement age in the US.

Walter Gonzalez died from pancreatic cancer, on October 17, 1979. He was 55 years old. He is buried at the Woodlawn Cemetery in Urbana, Illinois next to his wife Nelly and oldest son Walter Ramiro. One of Gonzalez's greatest joys was attending the college graduation of his son Mauricio at Yale University in 1978 and knowing that he had received an academic scholarship to study at Oxford University.

== Premio Ing. Walter Gonzalez a la Excelencia Academica ==
In 1994, in honor of her deceased husband, Nelly Sfeir Gonzalez established the Premio Ing. Walter Gonzalez a la Excelencia Académica for the top civil engineering student in the graduating at the Universidad Mayor de San Andres. The prize has been awarded continuously for more than 25 years. It consists of a diploma, a medal of honor, and a monetary payment.

Presenters of the prize have included Nelly Sfeir Gonzalez, Walter Ramiro Gonzalez, Mauricio Gonzalez, Fernando Gonzalez, Javier Gonzalez, Ing. Oscar Rios Castro, Mauricio Gonzalez-Karpovics, Dr. Fernando Murillo Lopez, and Omar Soria Carrion, among others.

The graduate with the highest career cumulative grade point average is Arpad Luis Gonzales Tomanyi (2001). Two brothers have won the prize: Angel Rodrigo Angulo Calderon (2014) and Juan Pablo Angulo Calderon (2018). Five women have won the prize, the first being Lucy Rufina Quispe Yampasi (1995). Two graduates engaged to each other have won the prize: Daniela Libertad Chalco Bustamante (2021) and Bryan Dilan Laura Carrillo (2022). The subspecialty that has won most often is Structures, although in recent years Sanitation and Hydrology have had strong showings. Winners have been educated both at private high schools (Amerinst, Domingo Savio, La Salle, San Calixo, etc.) as well as public high schools.

Table showing the year, first and last names, high school, subspecialty, and post-graduate studies of past winners of the Premio Ing. Walter Gonzalez a la Excelencia Academica.
Year	First Name	Last Name	Colegio Secundario / High School	Subspecialty	Post graduate studies	
1994	Marcelo Gonzalo	Delgadillo Zurita	Instituto Americano ("Amerinst"), La Paz	Structures		*
1995	Lucy Rufina	Quispe Yampasi	Colegio Marien Garten, La Paz	Structures		*
1996	Federico Guillermo	Krings Arcienaga	Colegio Britanico, Santa Cruz	Structures	Freiburg, Germany	*
1997	Carlos Horacio	Tapia Lopez		Structures	Belgium	*
1998	Reynaldo Juan	Quisbert Ucharico	Heroes del Boqueron, El Alto	Structures		*
1999	Edwin	Condori Coronel	Mariscal Jose Ballivian, Viacha	Sanitation & Waterways		*
2000	Jaime Luis Rony	Guerra Navarro	La Salle, La Paz	Structures & Hydrology		*
2001	Arpad Luis	Gonzales Tomanyi	San Calixto, La Paz	Structures	Netherlands	*
2002	Eleanor Juana	Sillerico Mayta	Unidad Educativa Parroquial San Jose, La Paz	Structures		*
2003	Freddy Angel	Soria Cespedes				*
2004	Roberto Carlos	Ortiz Meriles				*
2005	Fedor Omar	Perez Arteaga		Structures		*
2006	Roberto Andres	Rios Cordero		Sanitation		*
2007	Jose Luis	Chambi Chuquichambi		Structures		*
2008	Juan Gabriel	Salazar Romero		Structures		*
2009	Omar Hernan	Castillo Lopez		Hydrology		*
2010	David	Villalobos Huanca		Structures		*
2011	Freddy Alfredo	Mamani Choque		Structures		*
2012	Jaime	Garcia Tenorio		Structures		*
2013	Abel Joaquin	Cabrera Zapana		Sanitation		*
2014	Angel Rodrigo	Angulo Calderon		Strucutures		*
2014	Julio Cesar	Copana Paucara		Structures		*
2015	Hector Alejandro	Paredes Arevalo		Structures		*
2016	Gracia Esther	Sillerico Herrera		Sanitation		*
2017	Leydi Lourdys	Quispe Mamani		Structures		*
2018	Juan Pablo	Angulo Calderon		Hydrology		*
2019	Jorge Rodrigo	Chipana Perez		Roads & Transportation		*
2020	Pablo Alejandro	Bustillos Santander	Instituo Americano ("Amerinst")	Structures		*
2021	Daniela Libertad	Chalco Bustamante	Colegio Marien Garten, La Paz	Sanitation		*
2022	Bryan Dilan	Laura Carrillo	Colegio Hugo Davila La Paz	Hydrology		*
2023	Rodrigo Edson	Andrade Vasquez	Colegio Domingo Savio, Calacoto	Hydrology		*
2024	Osmar Alejandro	Mendoza Arteaga	Instituto Americano ("Amerinst") La Paz	Hydrology		*
2025	Veronica	Honorio Viracocha	Colegio Boliviano Holandes	Sanitation		*
2026						*
2027						*
2028						*
2029						
