= Clodoaldo Soto Ruiz =

Peruvian Quechua scholar

- Born: Huanta, Ayacucho
- Occupations: Scholar, writer
- Writing career
- Language: Quechua, Spanish
- Years active: 1976–present
- Genre: Linguistics
- Notable work: Manual de Enseñanza Quechua (1979)
- Notable awards: Quechua Award for Lifetime Achievement

Clodoaldo Soto Ruiz is a Peruvian scholar, author and former Quechua professor at the University of Illinois at Urbana–Champaign.

== Education and career ==
He taught Quechua for more than 25 years at the University of Illinois. He published dictionaries, a grammar book on Ayacucho Quechua, articles, and his pedagogical Quechua manual which is widely used by many students and teachers around the world.

During his time at the University of Illinois he also published Correo de Lingüística Andina, an annual newsletter on Quechua instruction.

== Awards and honors ==
In 2015 Soto Ruiz received the Quechua Award for Lifetime Achievement by The Quechua Alliance.

== Works ==
- 1976: Diccionario quechua, Ayacucho-Chanca. Ministerio de Educación, Instituto de Estudios Peruanos, Lima, 1976. 183 pages.
- 1976: Gramática quechua, Ayacucho-Chanca. Ministerio de Educación, Instituto de Estudios Peruanos, Lima, 1976. 182 pages.
- 1979: Quechua: manual de enseñanza. Lima, Instituto de Estudios Peruanos (IEP). 444 pages.
- 1988: Quechua: Tres o cinco vocales. Editorial Universidad Nacional de San Cristóbal de Huamanga (UNSCH), Ayacucho.
- 1990: Los contenidos de un alfabeto Quechua. In: Rodolfo Cerrón Palomino, Gustavo Solís Fonseca (eds.): Temas de lingüística amerindia. CONYTEC/GTZ, Lima, pp. 197–211.
- 1995: Cuzco Quechua Grammar. Material to Complement the Teaching of Quechua as a Second Language, April 18, 1995. Center for Latin American and Caribbean Studies, University of Illinois. 133 pages.
- 1995: Cuzco Quechua Teaching Materials. Center for Latin American and Caribbean Studies, University of Illinois.
- 1993: Quechua: manual de enseñanza. Lima, Instituto de Estudios Peruanos (IEP). 442 pages, ISBN 9788489303249, 848930324X.
- 2006: Quechua: manual de enseñanza. Lima, Instituto de Estudios Peruanos (IEP). 442 pages, ISBN 9789972511615, 9972511618.
- 2013: Cuaderno de ejercicios y evaluaciones – Quechua: manual de enseñanza. Lima, Instituto de Estudios Peruanos (IEP). 243 pages, ISBN 9789972514371, 9972514374.
- 2016: ¿Chaymantaqá? ¿Y después? Quechua avanzado. Quechua: manual de enseñanza. Lima, Instituto de Estudios Peruanos (IEP), ISBN 9789972511615, 9972511618

=== With other authors ===
- Zonia Cueto Gálvez, Clodoaldo Soto Ruiz: Briznas andinas. Movimiento de Adolescentes y Niños Trabajadores Hijos de Obreros Cristianos, Lima 1990. 250 pages.
- Clodoaldo Soto Ruiz, Esteban Quiroz Cisneros, 2012: Quechua-Spanish-English functional dictionary Ayacucho-chanka (Runasimi-kastillanu-inlis llamkaymanaq qullqa Ayakuchu-chanka). San Isidro (Lima), Lluvia Editores. 326 pages, ISBN 9786124095054, 612409505X.
