= Pietro Sfair =

Maronite Catholic Archbishop

- Title: Archbishop and Ordinarius for the Maronite faithful of Rome

Personal life
- Born: Boutros Javad Sfeir; February 10, 1888 Kleiat, Keserwan, Lebanon
- Died: May 18, 1974 (aged 86) Rome, Italy

Religious life
- Religion: Christianity
- Church: Maronite Church
- Ordination: March 8, 1913
- Consecration: May 24, 1953

Pietro Sfair (10 February 1888 - 18 May 1974 ) was a Lebanese Catholic prelate who was the Diocesan Bishop of the Maronite Catholic Church of Antioch in Rome, Italy, where he also served as Rector of the Maronite College. Pope John XXIII appointed Sfair as the titular Archbishop of Nisibis. Sfair was a Council Father (and the most senior Maronite cleric) at all four sessions of the Second Vatican Council.

Sfair's ministry at the Roman discotheque Piper Club while he was a cardinal drew reporters.
