= Marwood Apartments =

- U.S. National Register of Historic Places
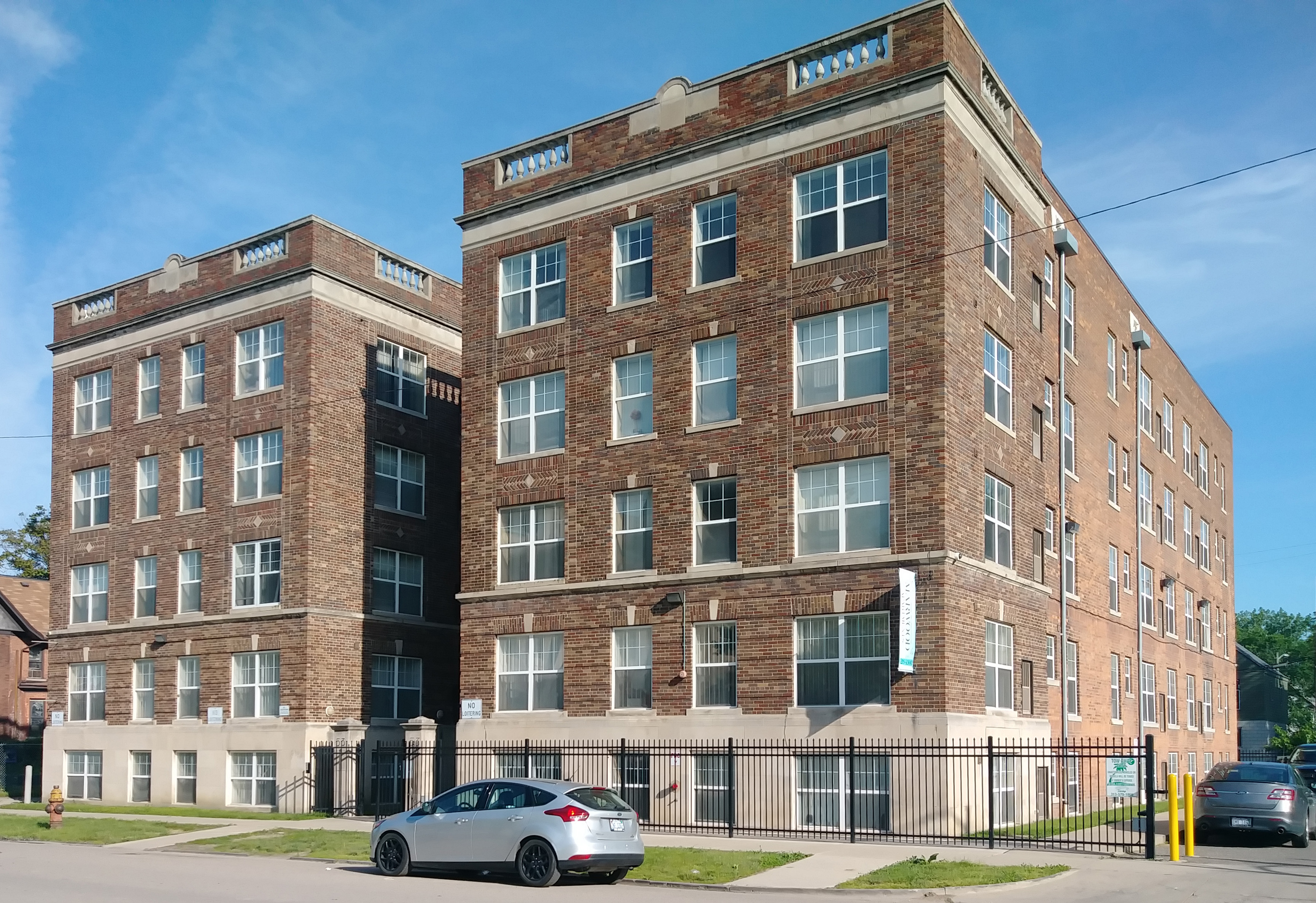
- Interactive map
- Location: 53 Marston St. Detroit, Michigan
- Coordinates: 42.37554°N 83.0755°W
- Area: less than one acre
- Built: 1925
- Architect: Harvey J. Haughey
- Architectural style: Neoclassical
- NRHP reference No.: 100003937
- Added to NRHP: May 16, 2019

The Marwood Apartments is an apartment building located at 53 Marston Street in Detroit, Michigan. It was listed on the National Register of Historic Places in 2019.

== History ==
Detroit expanded greatly in the 1910s and 1920s, creating a boom in housing construction of all types, notably including the construction of large apartment buildings. In 1925, developer Emil C. Pokorny of Pokorny & Company hired local architect Harvey J. Haughey to design this building, one of five Porknoy developed in Detroit. Construction began late that year, and was finished in mid-1925. The apartments were rented as fully furnished units. The apartments were marketed to professionals and white-collar workers, and residents included a number of teachers as well as an embalmer, nurses, stenographers, a solicitor, an accountant, and bookkeepers. Notable early residents at the Marwood included boxing promoter manager Al Werbe, silent film start Allan Forrest, and organist F. Dudleigh Vernor, who composed the song Sweetheart of Sigma Chi.

In 2016, the Marwood Apartments was acquired by Develop Detroit, a nonprofit dedicated to preserving affordable housing. The group plans to renovate the 53 existing apartments, and construct a similarly sized building on an adjacent lot, which will add up to 60 new apartment units.

== Description ==
The Marwood Apartments is a U-shaped four-and-a-half-story, Neoclassical multi-tone red brick building. It has a flat roof and a raised basement. The U shape creates a narrow courtyard in the center, which leads to the building entrance at the back of the courtyard. The entrance is located in a projecting, one-story pavilion, and consists of a door with surrounding sidelight and transom. Flanking the entrance are tall arched opening on the first floor, containing double-hung windows. Five windows double-hung are on each floor above. The front of the courtyard is decorated with limestone piers.

The ends of the "U" make up the front facade. Each end has a tall limestone basement level, with window sills that are just above ground level. The brick walls above contain projecting stretcher courses at regular intervals, creating a rusticated look. Every floor has four window openings with limestone lintels below and limestone keystones above. A limestone entablature and a stone balustrade within a limestone frame tops the building. Other walls have similar window openings.
