= Edward Mason Eggleston =

American artist and illustrator (1882–1941)

- Edward M. Eggleston in 1937, painting an Image used for the Great Lakes Exposition posters and pamphlets.
- Born: November 22, 1882; Ashtabula, Ohio
- Died: January 14, 1941 (aged 58); New York City
- Education: Columbus Art School
- Known for: Storytelling images, fashion and fantasy images, portraits, calendar and advertising illustrations
- Movement: Art Deco, Genre painting, Fantasy art

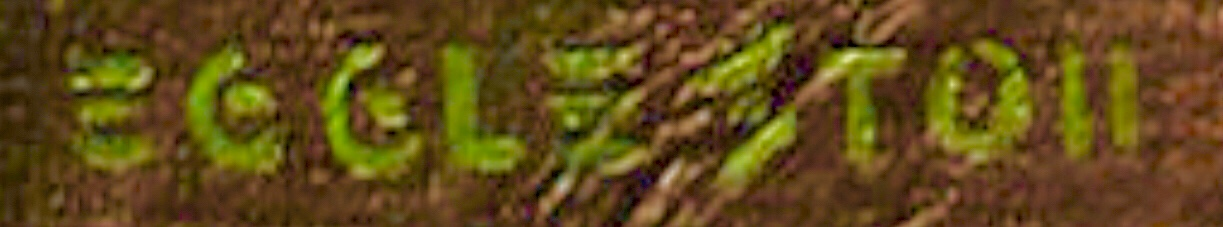
Edward Mason Eggleston, signature from artwork, 1919

Art Deco examples

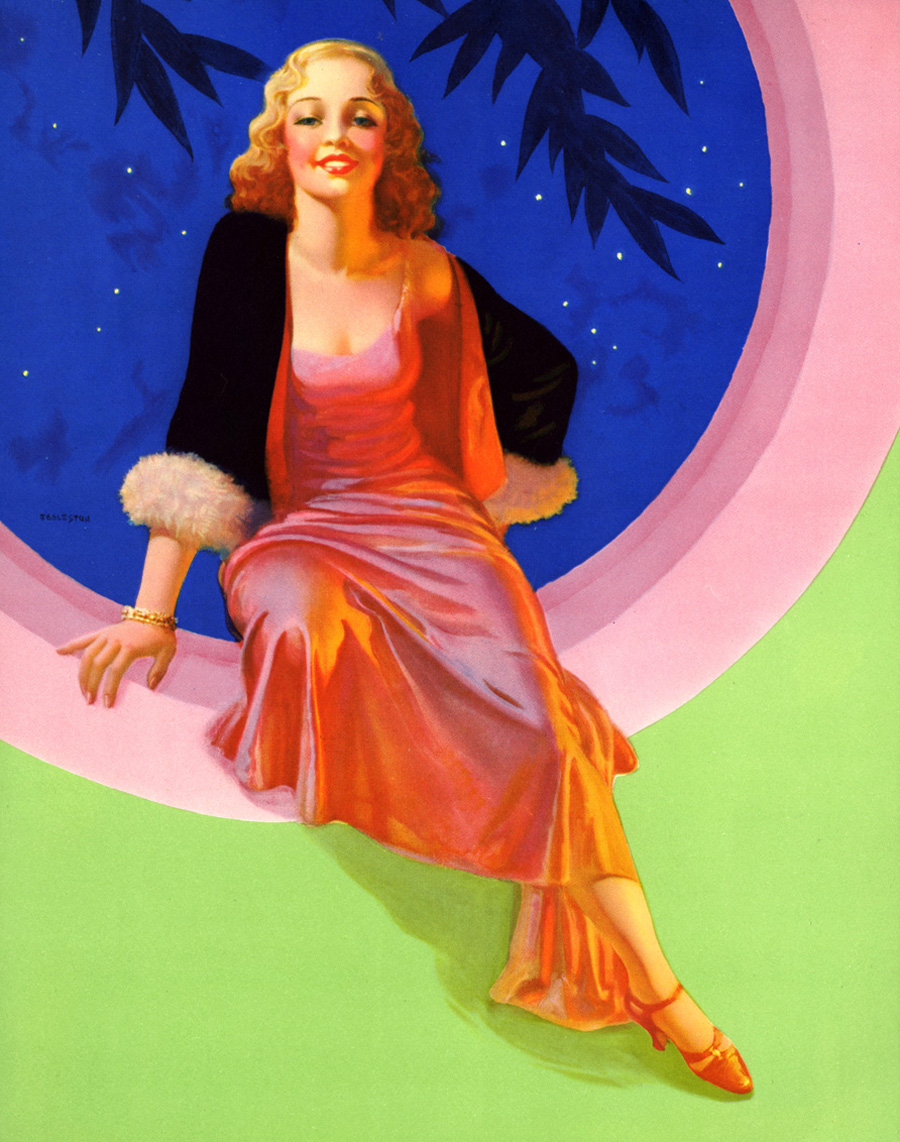
Although not all of Eggleston’s may be considered Art Deco, he did create pieces with elements of the genre, including bright colors, abstracted florals, clean lines, sweeping curves and geometric shapes.

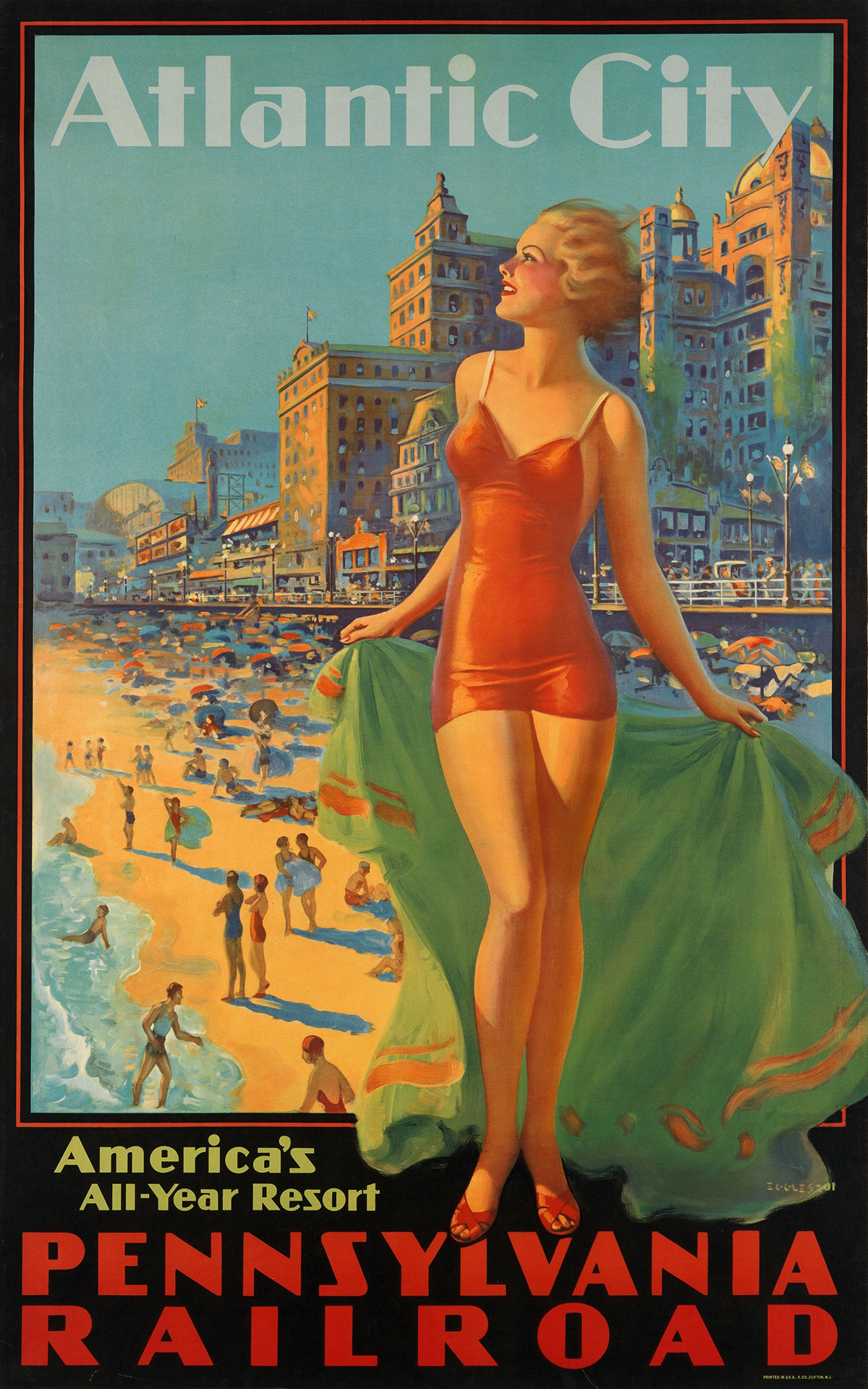
Art Deco depicts the modern. Here, modern living, modern choice of clothes, solid buildings with geometric shapes and clean lines.

Edward Mason Eggleston (22 November 1882 – 14 January 1941) was an American painter who specialized in calendar portraits of women, fashionable and fantastic. He was also a well known commercial illustrator doing work for companies such as the Fisk Tire Company, the Pennsylvania Railroad, and the Great Lakes Exposition.

He attended the Columbus Art School in Columbus, Ohio and moved to New York about 1915, where he worked to illustrate magazine covers, travel posters, advertisements and calendars. He worked primarily with oil paints on canvas, and also with pastels, water colors, and gouache.

Eggleston tapped into an American trend toward escapist fantasy during the Great Depression years of the 1930s. Described as "storytelling," his calendar works focused on women in stylish and fashionable dresses and hats, swimwear, or costumed as Native-American women, "Egyptian goddesses," pirate girls, and women in the character of Peter Pan.

== Style and the Golden Age of Illustration ==
Eggleston painted to create illustrations. He was a successful illustrator during the 1920s and 1930s, a period included in the Golden Age of Illustration.

The work of artists, Eggleston included, was influenced by what would sell to the American public. While boundaries were pushed with some images, such as in areas of nudity and sexuality, publishers sought images that would sell. One aspect of Modernism (of which Art Deco is part) was that artists were resisting a status quo. It meant an artist deciding for himself or herself what standards he would aspire to achieve. By the very nature of illustration, art in which a publisher or editor has a say, the artist's deciding for himself the standards he will meet is limited.

== Early life and education ==
Eggleston was born in Ashtabula, Ohio. By his late teens, he was living in Columbus, and was counted there in US Census in 1900.

He attended the Columbus Art School.

He was married in Montgomery, Ohio in 1907 to Ethel Grace Leland. Around 1908, they moved to Rochester, New York, where he was listed as a "designer" in the 1909 and 1910 city directory.

By 1918, Eggleston established his own business in Brooklyn, describing himself as a commercial illustrator in his registration for the draft.

== Commercial ==
Painter versus illustrator, color palette

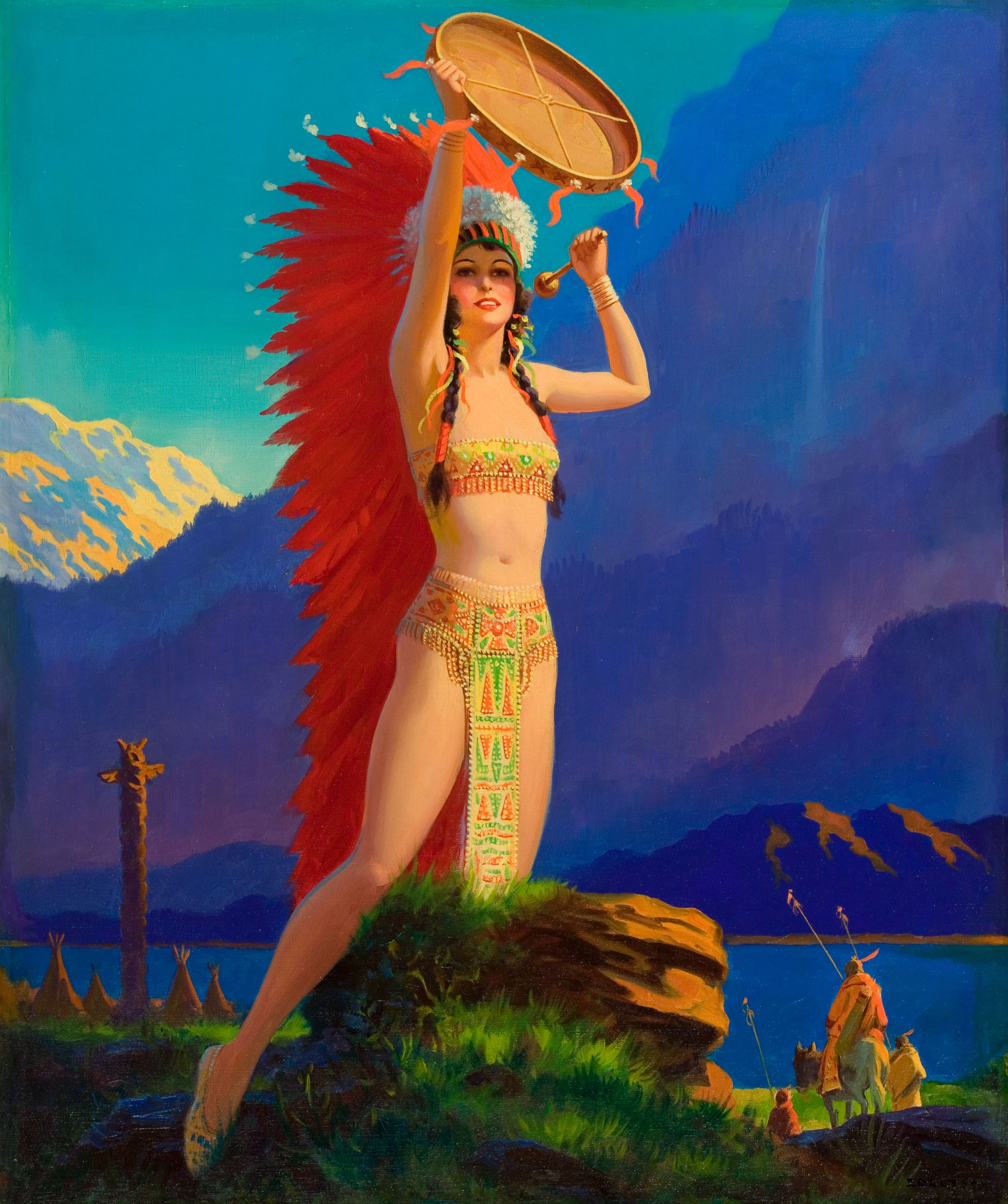
As a 20th-century illustrator, Eggleston may have had to think about the final printing process when choosing colors, because the printing process changes them.

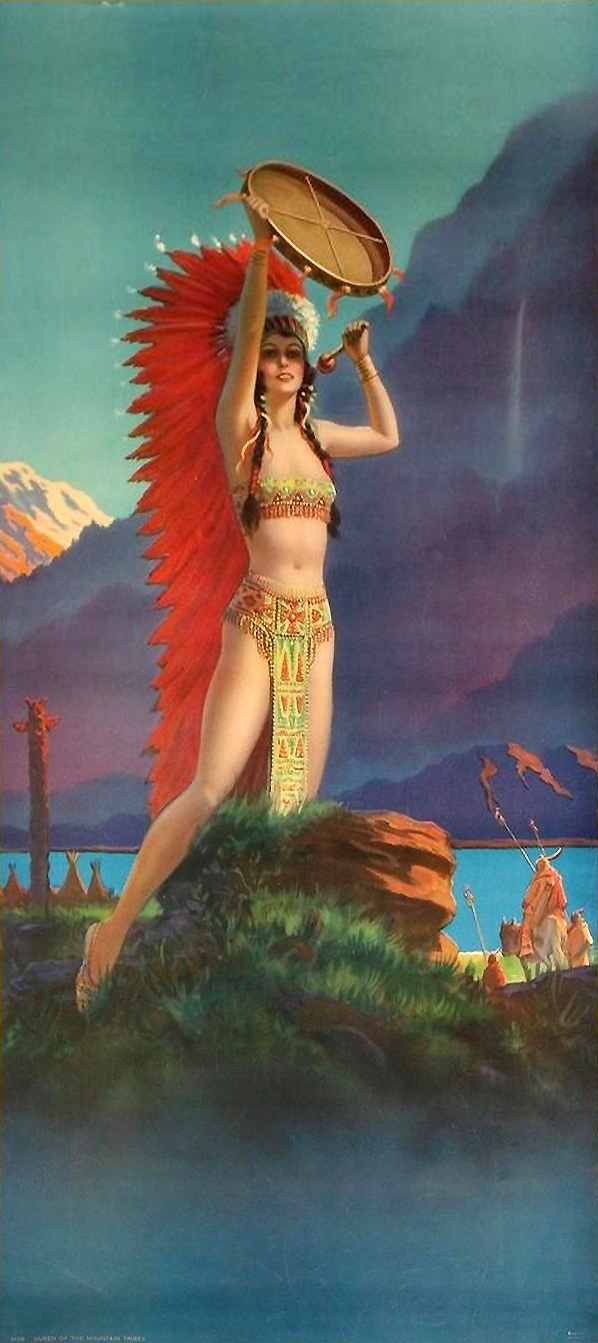
When his painting was printed, the colors were muted.

For a painter, the painting is the final product. An illustrator's painting might be only one stage of image creation.

Eggleston created artwork for use in magazines. The work can be broadly categorized as illustrations for stories and advertisements.

His work for Chase Velmo upholstery, used for car seats, showed women (and a few men) admiring or luxuriating in the upholstery of the automobile. He created artwork for Willys-Knight, Gardner, Cadillac, Kissel, Studebaker, and Buick, showing the luxury of the car interiors and exteriors.

=== Better known works ===
In 1916, Eggleston created an iconic painting for the Fisk Tire Company, one of a number of illustrations the company used to show its advertising icon, a boy with a tire. Eggleston's painting was printed, the print varnished to resemble a painting, and hung in Fisk tire stores. He also created the art for a Great Lakes Exposition advertisement in 1937, used on "millions of posters and booklets." He also did an Art Deco series of paintings featuring railroad destinations for the Pennsylvania Railroad.

He produced art for calendar makers. His images were also used for jigsaw puzzles.

== List of works ==
Variations of Flame of the Mesa
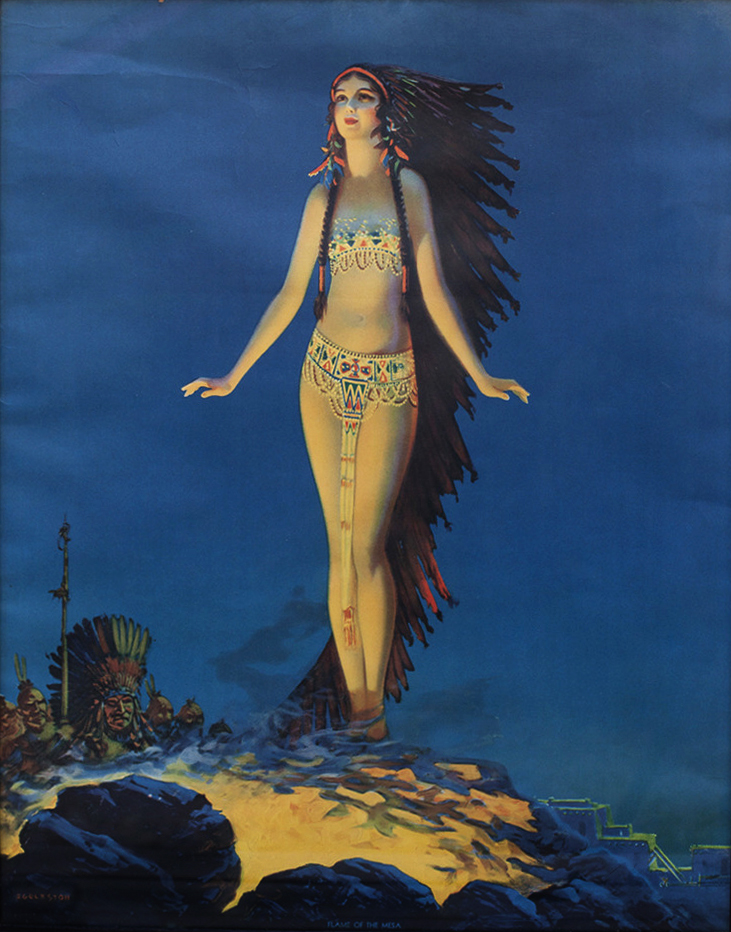
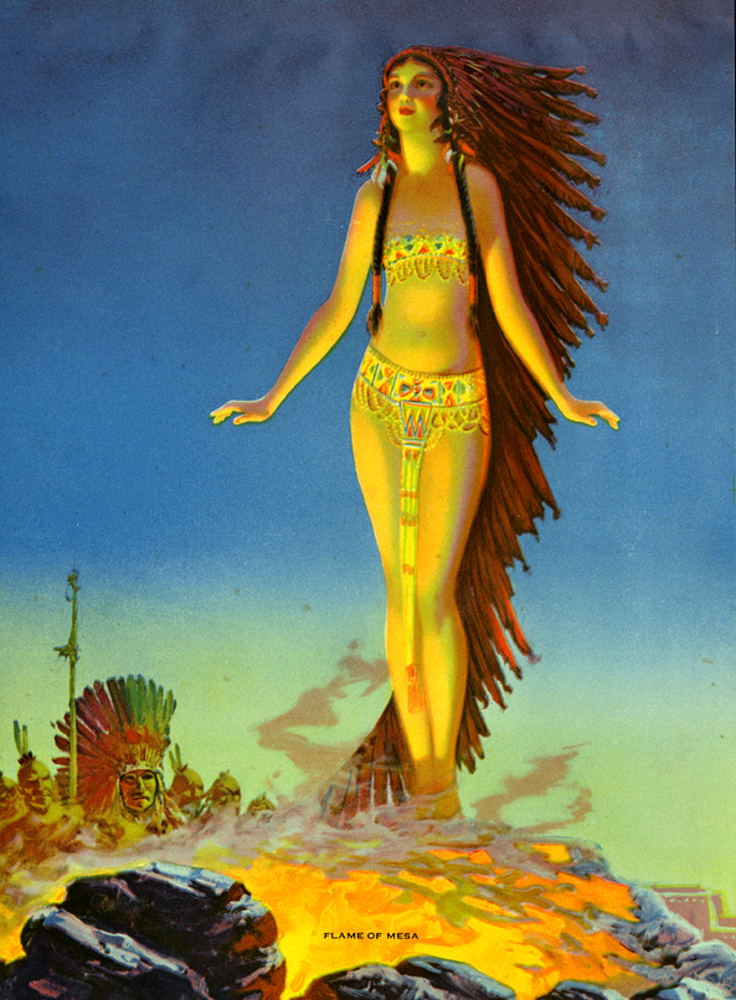
The printing process allowed different versions to be made from one painting.

=== Fashionable ===
- 1914, girl with fishing pole
- 1916 woman with skis
- 1916 woman with iceskates
- 1919 "The Sweetheart of Sigma Chi" or 1920 "Dixie"
- 1925 Portrait, jewelry catalog
- 1926 "The Opera Queen"
- 1927 "Hello" or "Night and the stars are calling"
- 1928 "Moonlight and You"
- 1928 "The Valentine Girl"
- 1928 "Wonderful One"
- 1929 "Memories"
- 1929 "Golden Glory"
- 1929 "Sunshine"
- 1930 "Going Up"
- 1930 "Here I Am"
- 1930 "Vacation Days" woman in a red swimsuit calendar photo
- 1932 "A Day in June", girl and butterfly
- 1931"Top 'O the World", Woman with horse, '30s
- 1932 girl picking flowers under blue sky
- 1933 "A-milking we will go"
- 1933 "Found"
- 1934 "On Time"
- 1934 "Girl in Red Gown"
- 1934 "Moonlight and Roses"
- 1937 "Lantern Glow"
- 1937 "Tambourine Dancer"
- 1938 "A Bonnie Lassie"
- 1938 "Orchids"
- 1939 "Riding High" woman on horseback in front of red cliff
- "The Beauty"
Fantasy Theme, Peter Pan

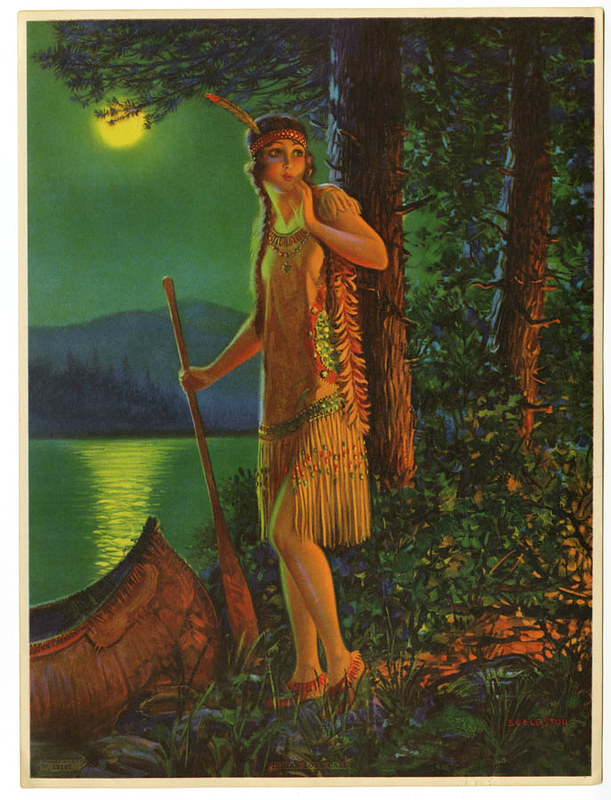
Indian maidens feature in at least seven works.

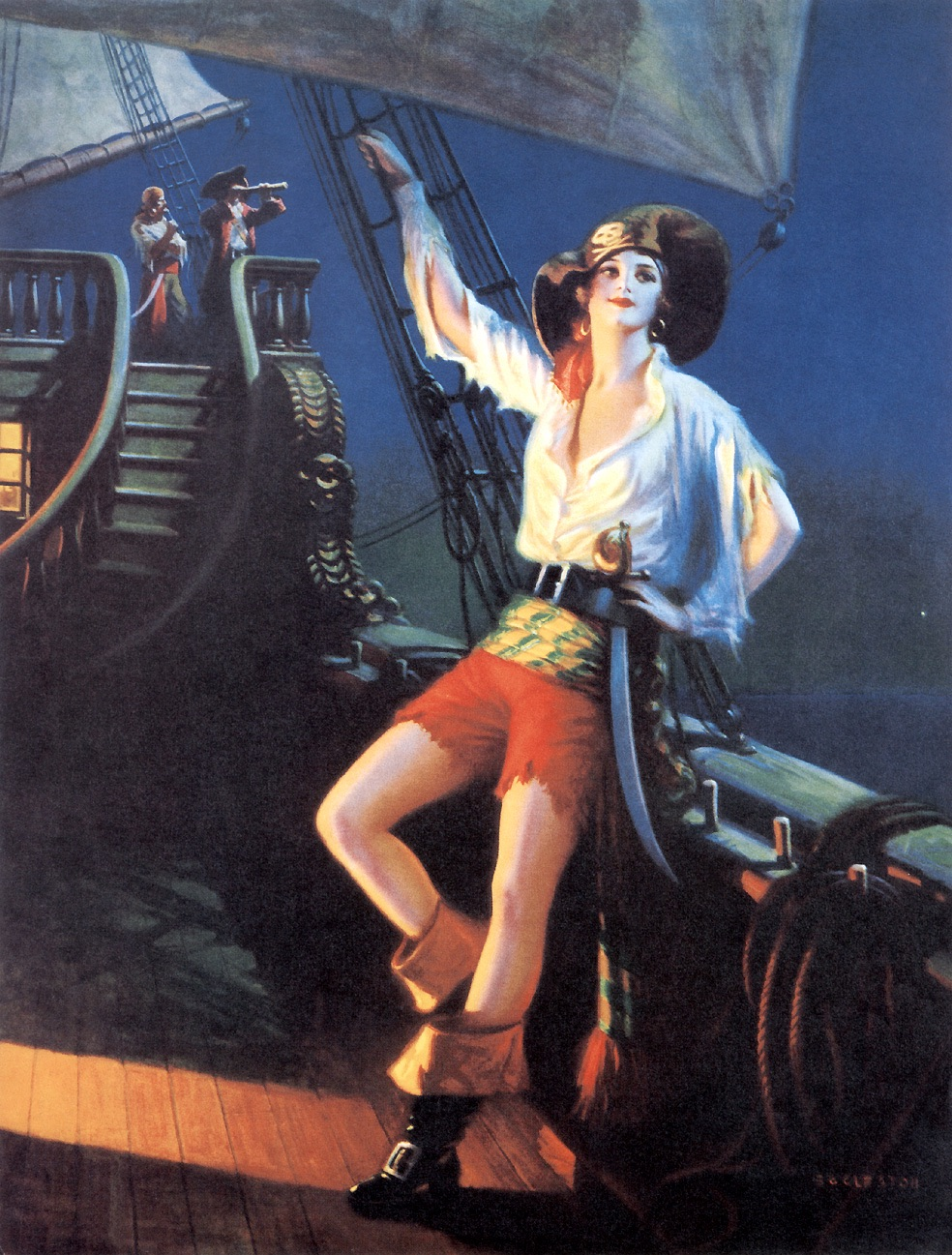
Pirates are shown in four paintings.

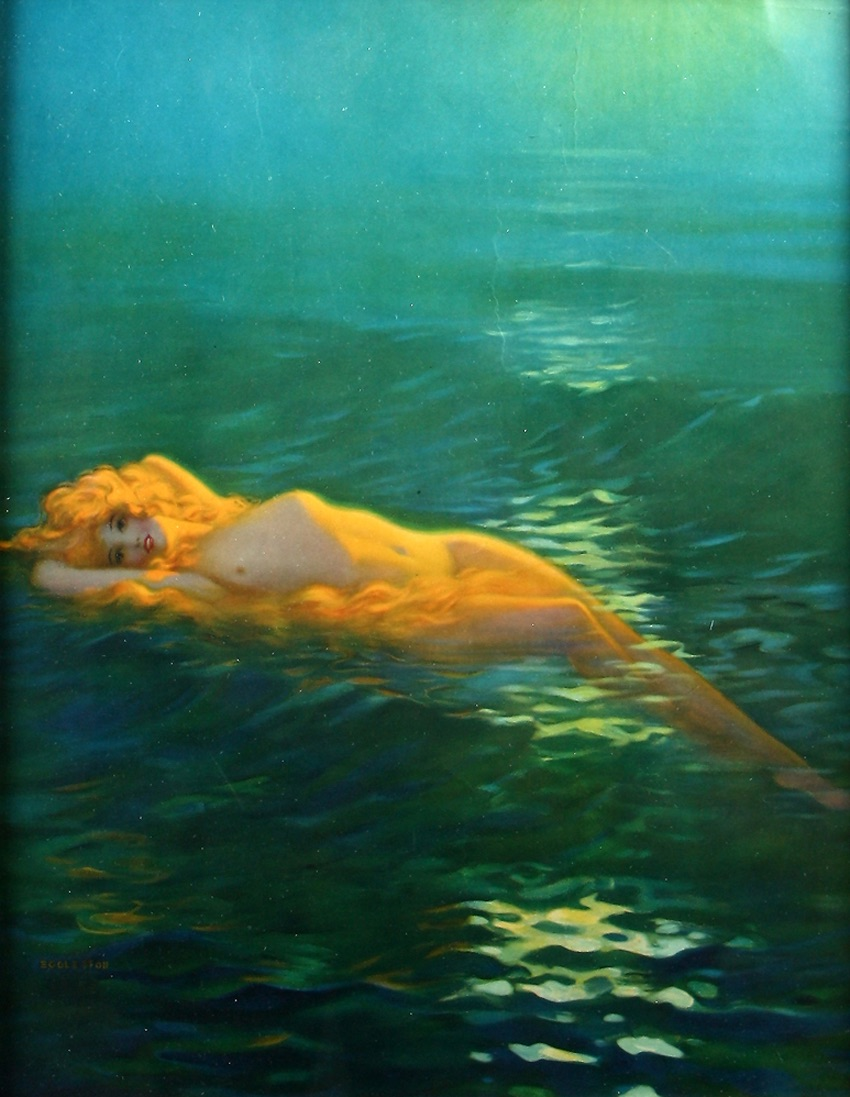
A girl in the ocean like a mermaid

Along with Peter Pan, Eggleston illustrated characters that are similar to those in the book, although all are female. Only Peter Pan is named.

=== Fantasy ===
- c. 1925 "Isle of Dreamy Melodies"
- 1927 "Indian Love Call"
- 1929 "Pirate Queen of the Deck"
- 1929 "Starlight"
- 1929 "Bringing Home the Treasure"
- 1930 "Pipes of Pan" or "Melody"
- 1930 "Princess of the Treasure Isle"
- 1931 "Evening Star"
- 1931 "Nymph and Frog" or "Enchantment"
- Couple sits looking at images in distance
- 1931 "Peter Pan" standing on rock
- 1931 "Queen of the Waves"
- 1932 Fantasy castle landscape
- 1932/33 "Flame of the Mesa"
- 1932 "Red Wing"
- 1932 "The Treasure Princess"
- 1933 "Mariquita" or "Spanish Dancer"
- 1933 "Softly play the Pipes of Pan"
- 1933 "The Proposal" or "Hearts Unmasked", c 1933
- 1933 "Midnight Ride of Paul Revere, 1933
- 1933 "Reaching for the Moon"
- 1934 "The Paradise of Peter Pan" 1934 calendar with baby birds
- 1934 "Cleopatra"
- 1935 "Peter Pan" with seagulls
- 1935 "Queen of the Mountain Tribes"
- 1936 "Flaming Arrow"
- 1936 "Playmates of Peter Pan"
- 1937 "Found"
- 1937 "Who, Who's There?" 1939 pinup
- 1938 "Lady of Mystery"
- "Gypsy Love Call"
- Dream Castle" or "Daydreams"

=== Still life or landscape ===
- 1932 Pillared terrace overlooks a fantasy castle across the water
- 1940s Lake Waterfall Cabin Salesman Sample Calendar Print

=== Travel posters and advertisements ===
- 1916 Fisk Tires Sleepy Boy
- 1935 Pennsylvania Railroad, Atlantic City, America's Great All Year Resort
- 1935 Pennsylvania Railroad, Atlantic City, America's All Year Resort
- 1935 Pennsylvania Railroad, Atlantic City, America's Greatest Seashore Resort
- 1935 Pennsylvania Railroad, Washington, The City Beautiful
- 1937 Billy Rose's Aquacade, Great Lakes Exposition
- 1937 Great Lakes Exposition

=== Puzzles ===
- Bessie Nowell, "Bringing Home the Treasure"
- Buckingham Jig Picture Puzzle, "Princess of the Treasure Isle"
- Detroit Gasket and Manufacturing Company, Dee-Gee puzzles, "Flame of the Mesa"
- Detroit Gasket and Manufacturing Company, Dee-Gee puzzles, "Isle of Dreamy Melodies"
- Detroit Gasket and Manufacturing Company, Dee-Gee puzzles, "Starlight
- Detroit Gasket and Manufacturing Company, Dee-Gee puzzles, "Treasure Princess
- Einson-Freeman Company, "The Proposal"
- Harter Jiggety Jig, "Princess of Treasure Isle"
- Jumble Jig Saw Puzzles, "Princess of the Treasure Isle"
- Louis F. Dow Company Jig Zag puzzle, "Evening Star"
- Parker Brothers, "Paradise of Peter Pan"
- Madmar Quality Company, Inc, "Indian Love Call"
- Royal Picture Puzzle, "Gypsy Love Call"
- Tuco Workshops, Inc., Tuco puzzle, "Cleopatra"
- Tuco Workshops, Inc., Tuco puzzle, "Paul Revere's Ride"
- Unknown maker, "Queen of the Dock"

== Gallery ==
See: Edward Mason Eggleston at Wikimedia Commons for more complete gallery

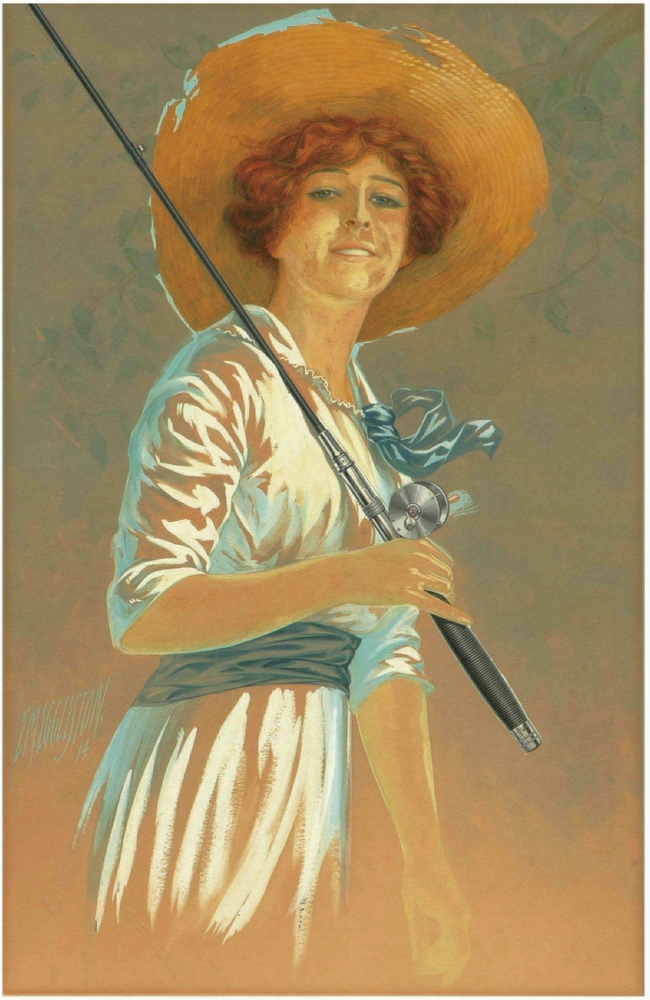
1914, girl with fishing pole

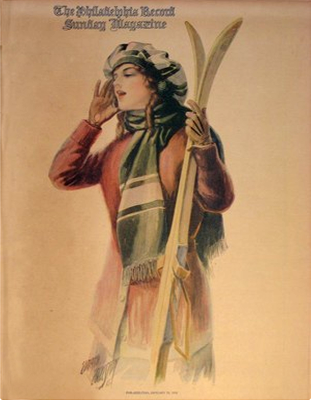
Philadelphia Record Sunday Magazine, January 23, 1916

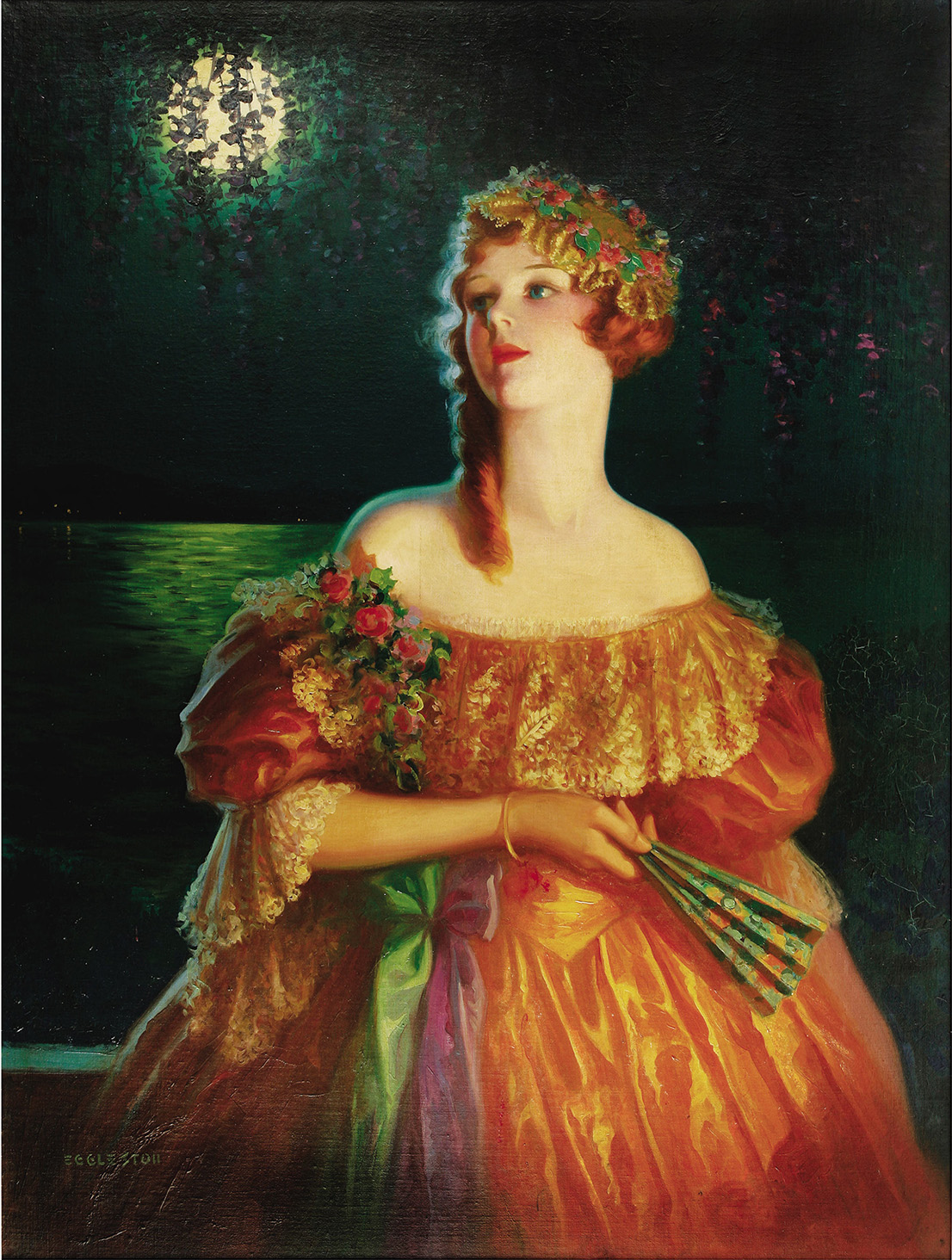
1919 The Sweetheart of Sigma Chi was modified in 1929 and called "Dixie."

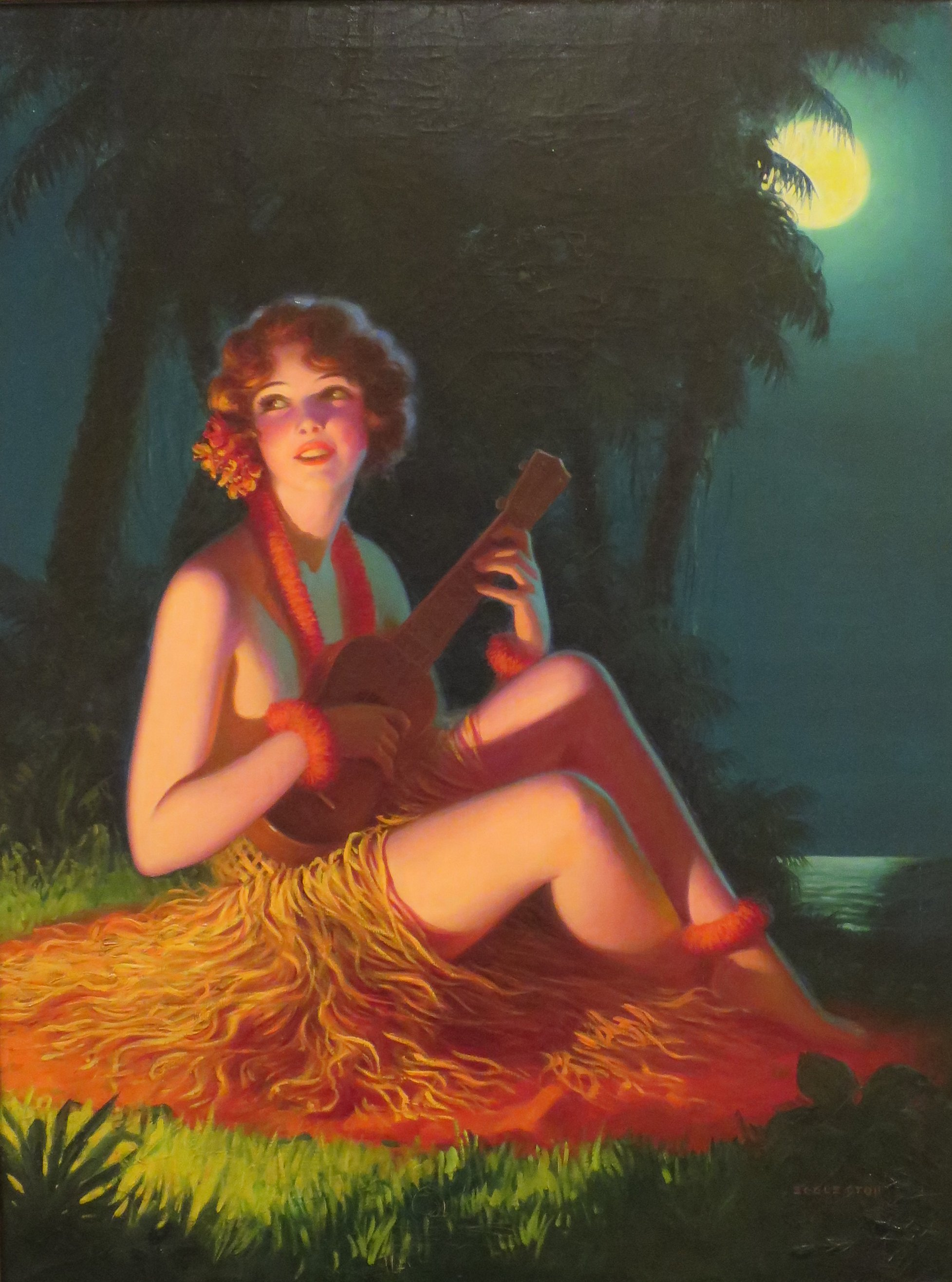
c. 1925 "Isle of Dreamy Melodies," girl in moonlight with a ukulele

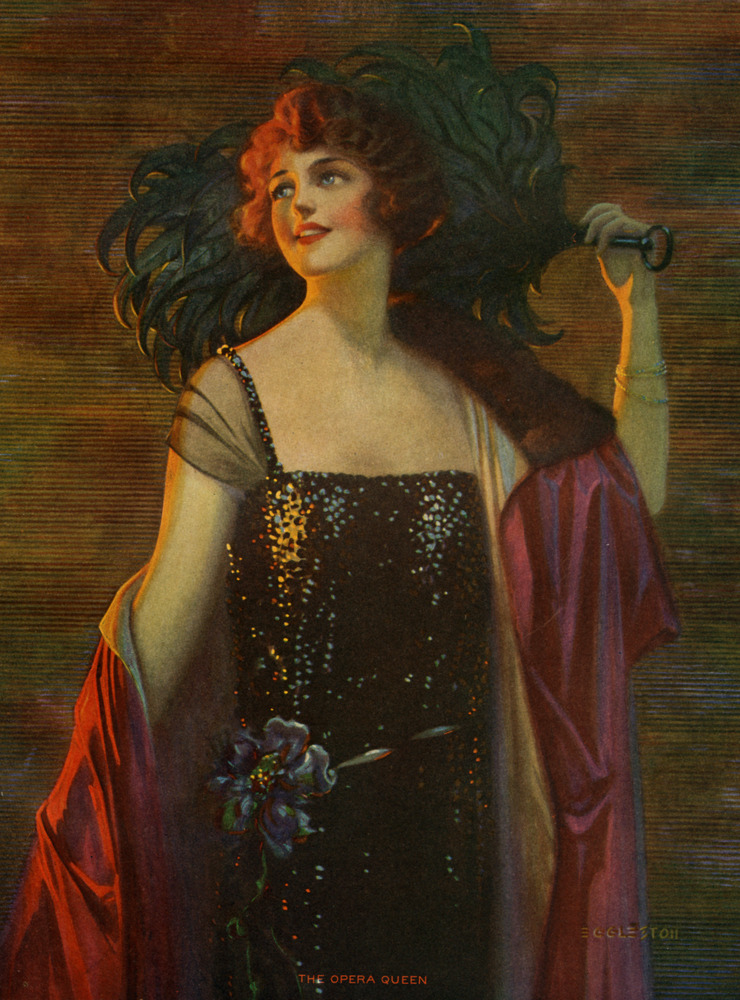
1926 “The Opera Queen”

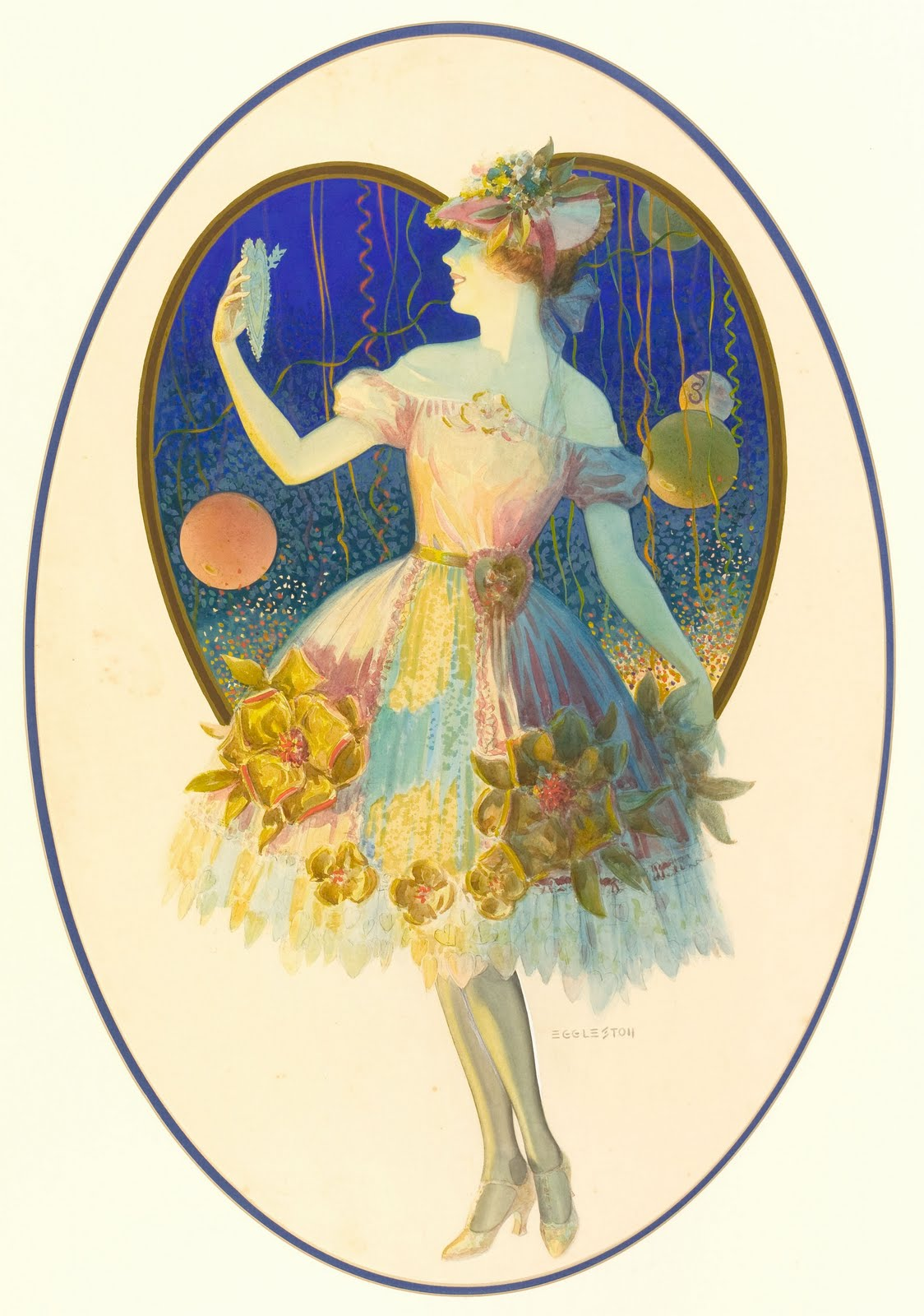
1928 "Valentine Girl" used on cover of Dennison's Party Magazine, January/February 1928

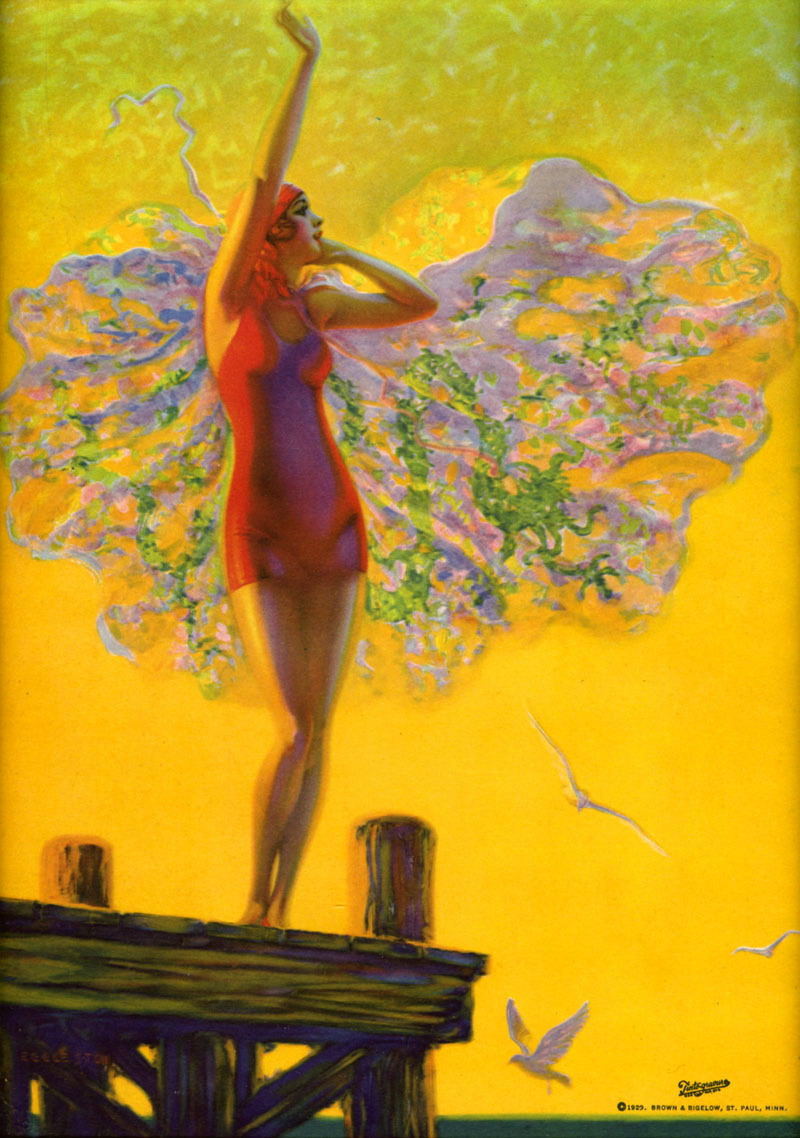
1929 "Golden Glory"

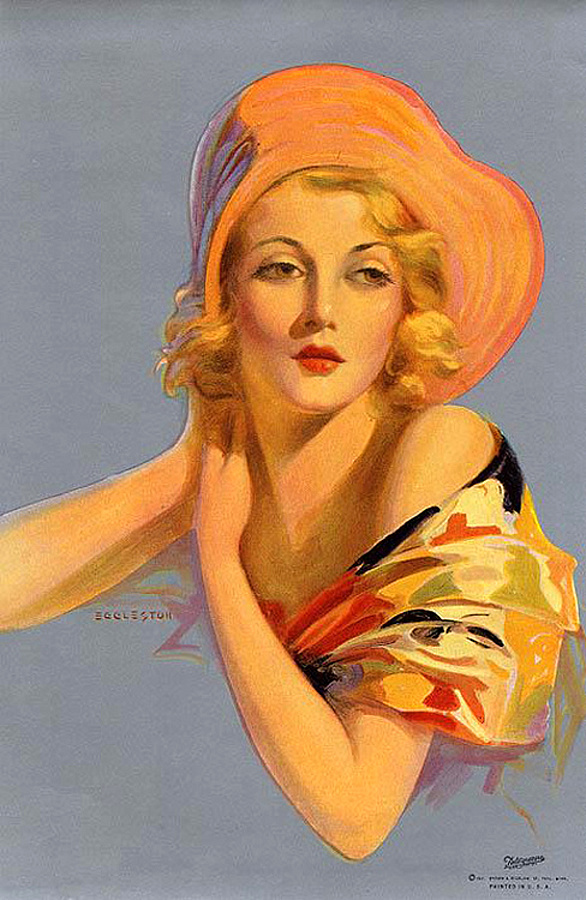
1929 "Memories"

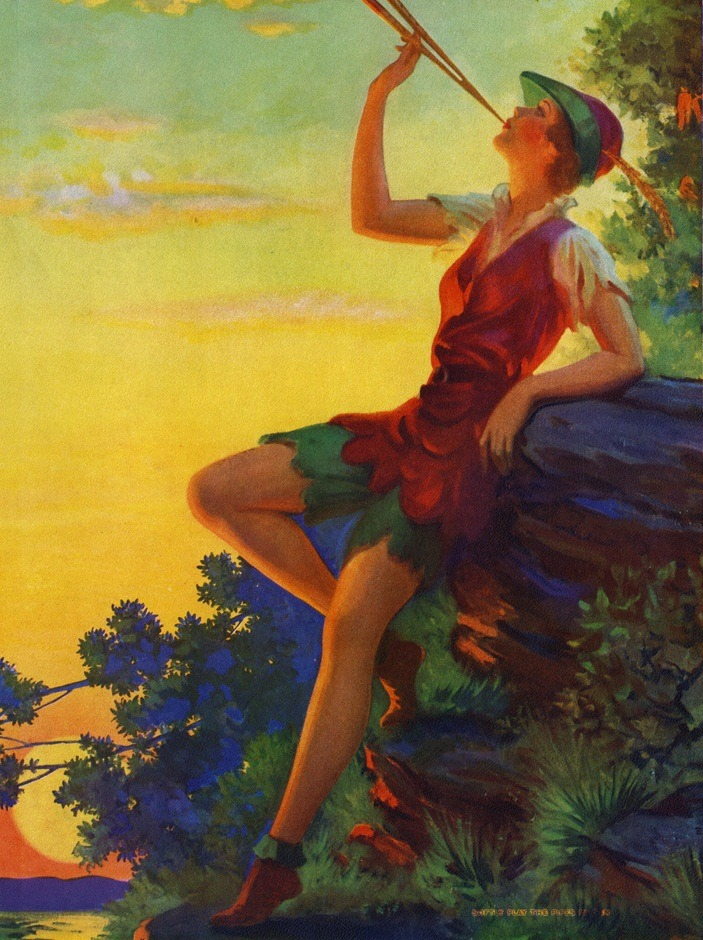
1933, "Softly Play the Pipes of Pan"

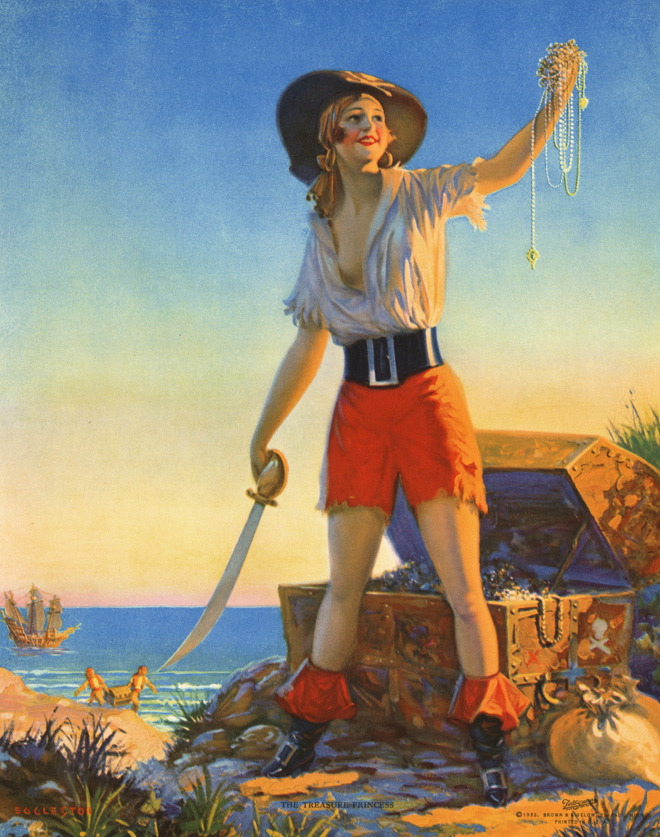
1931 “The Treasure Princess”

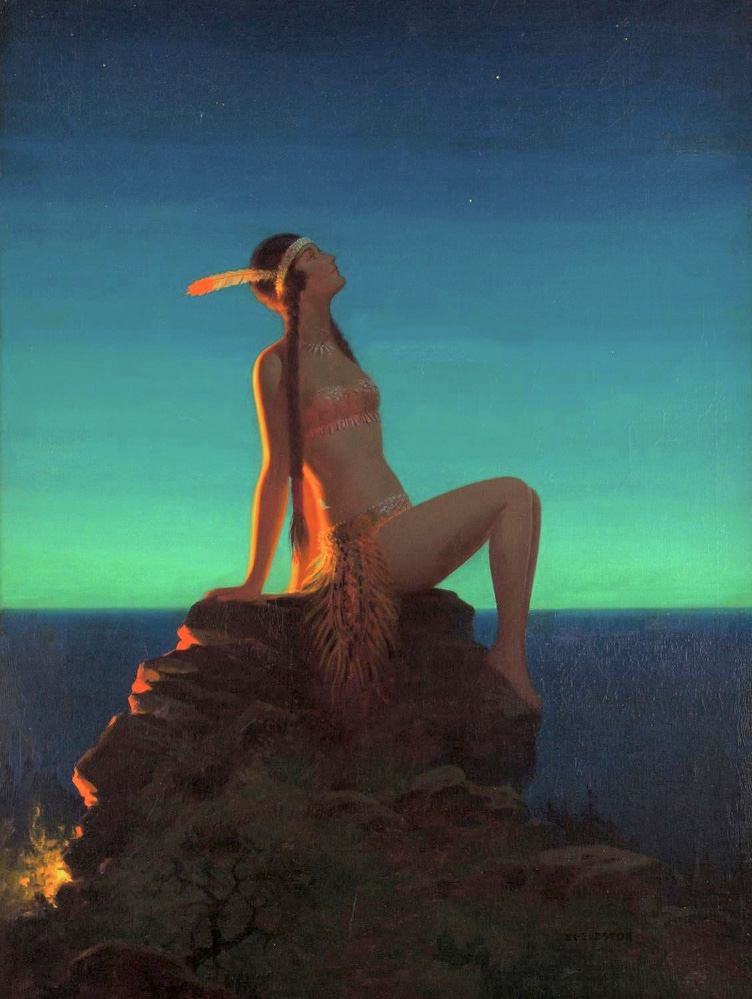
1931 "Evening Star"

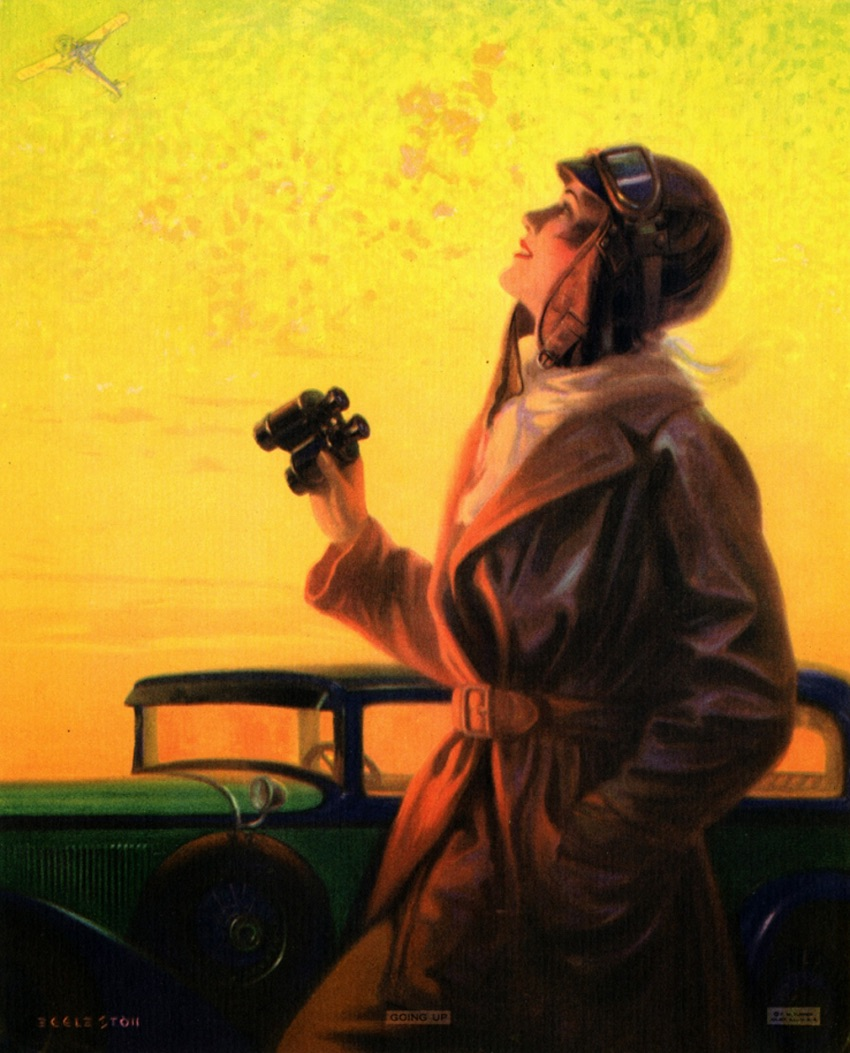
1931 "Going Up"

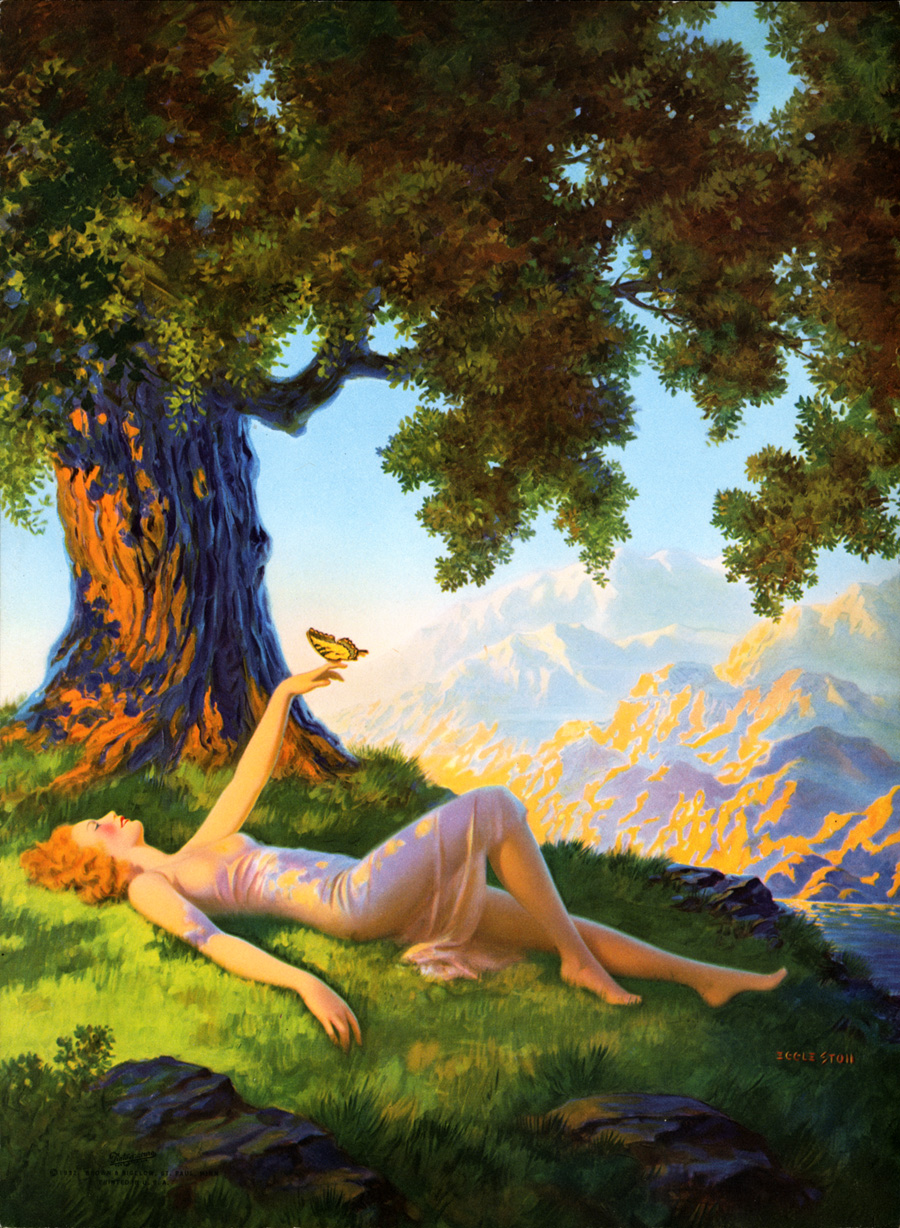
1932, A Day in June

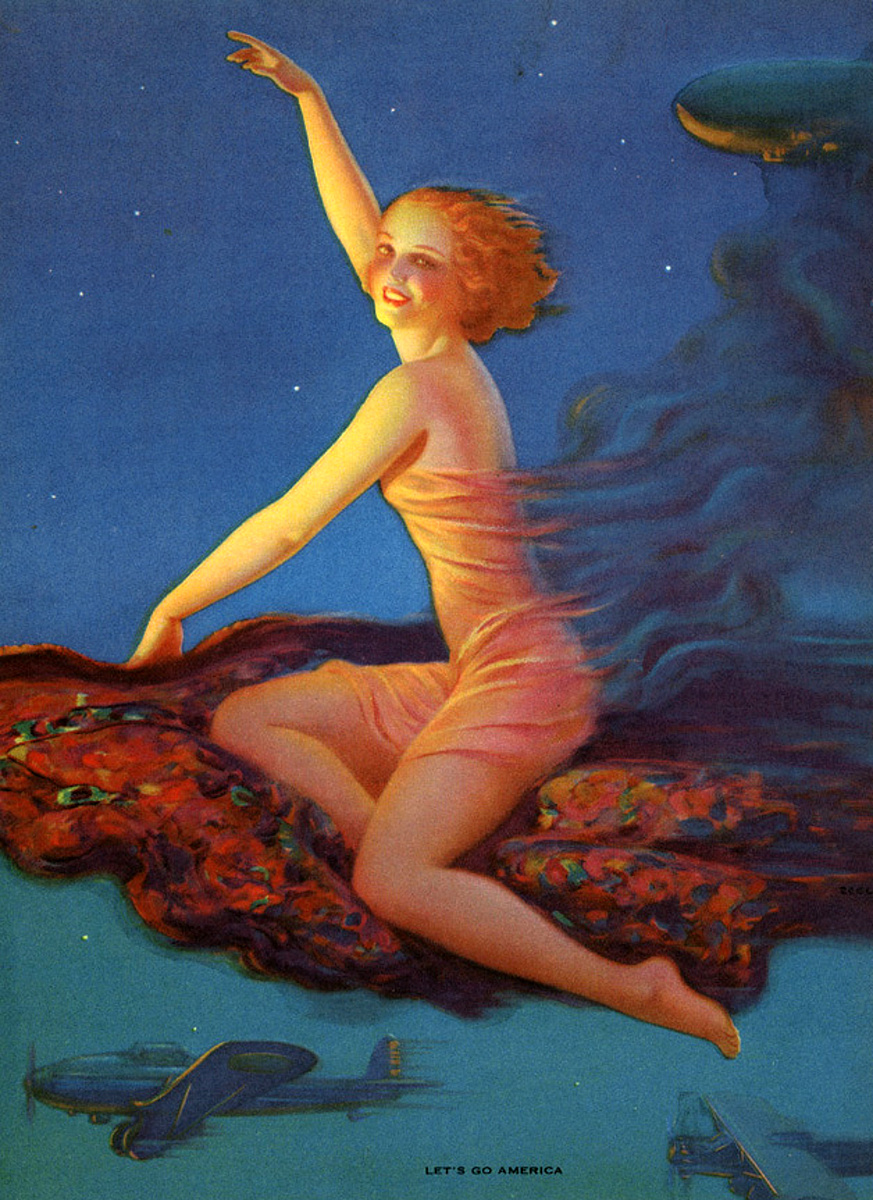
1932, Let's Go America

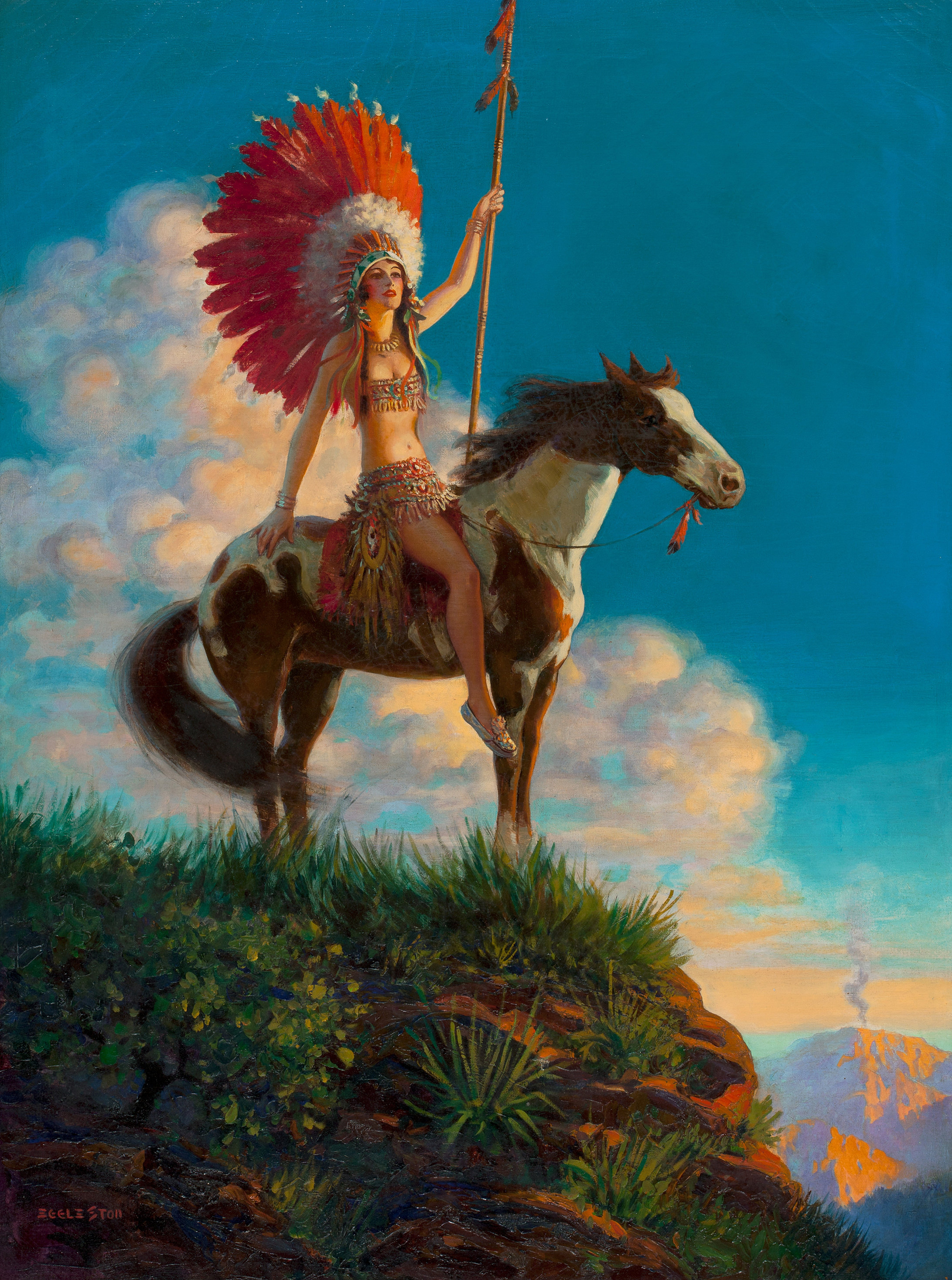
1932, Red Wing

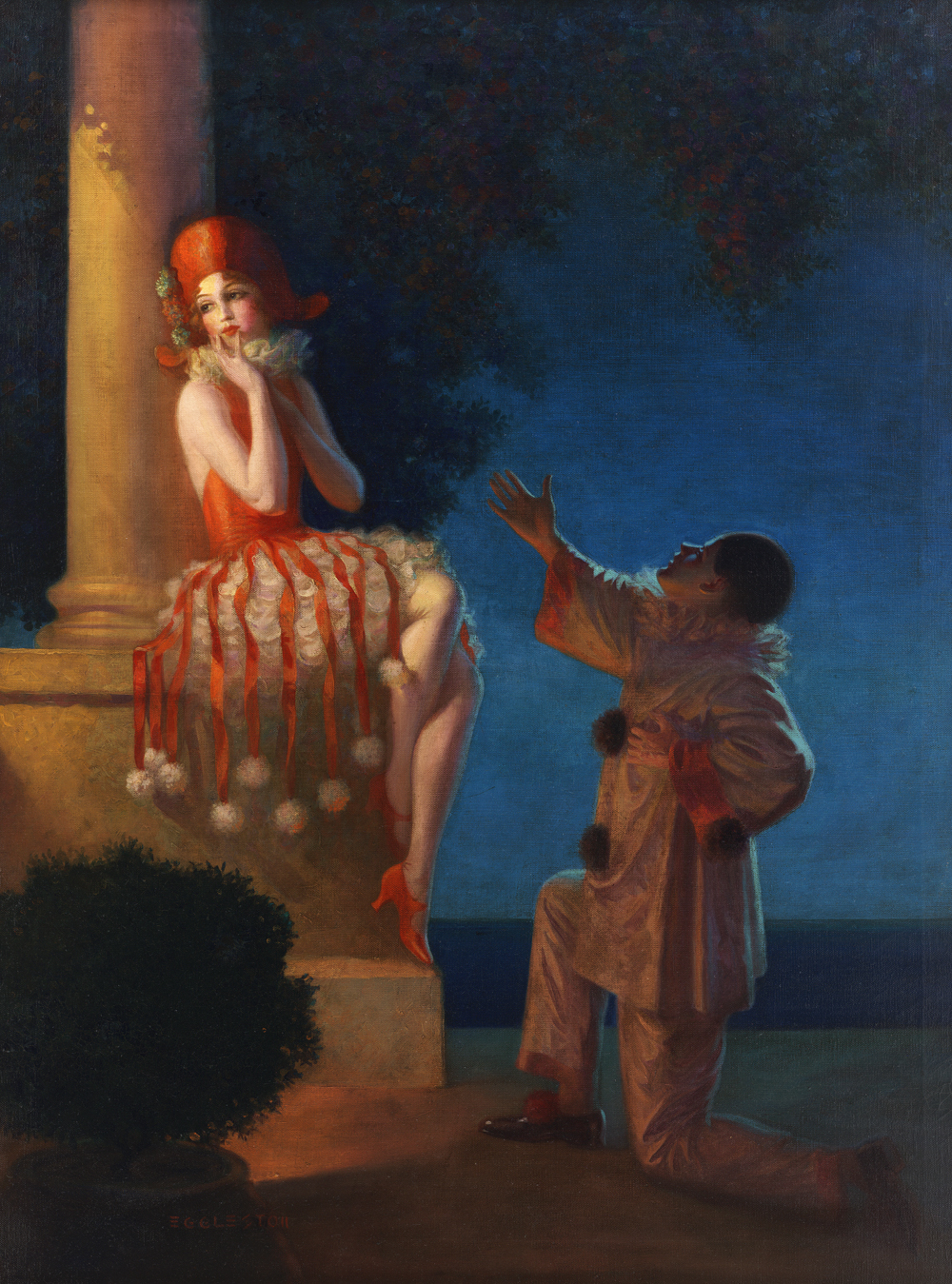
1933 "The Proposal" or "Hearts Unmasked"

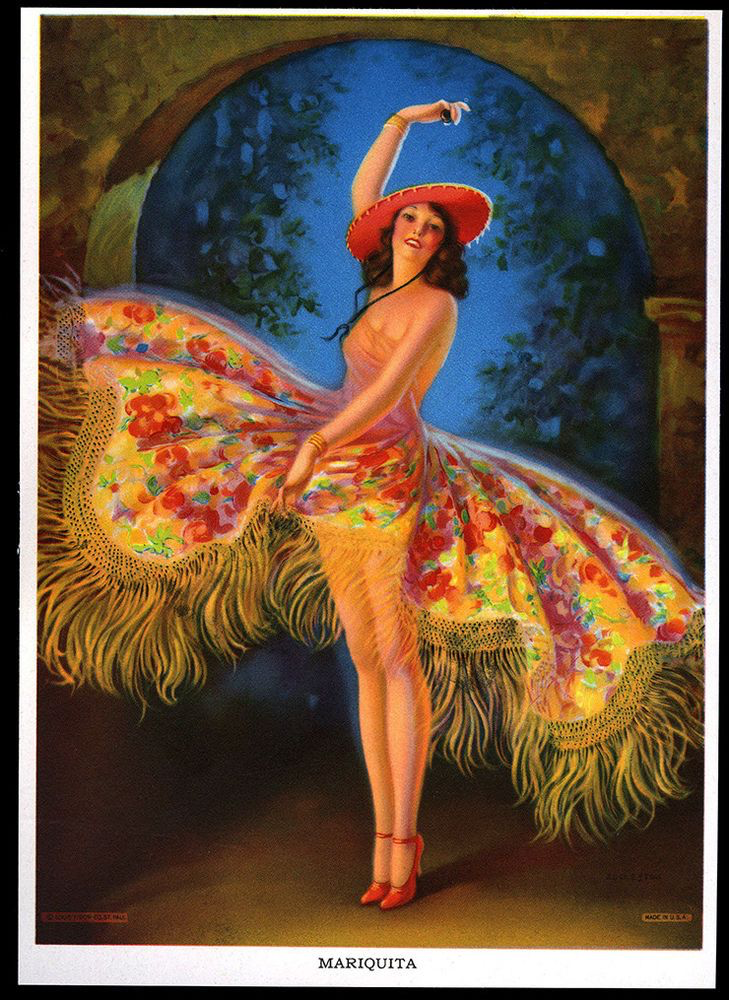
1933 "Mariquita" or "Spanish Dancer"

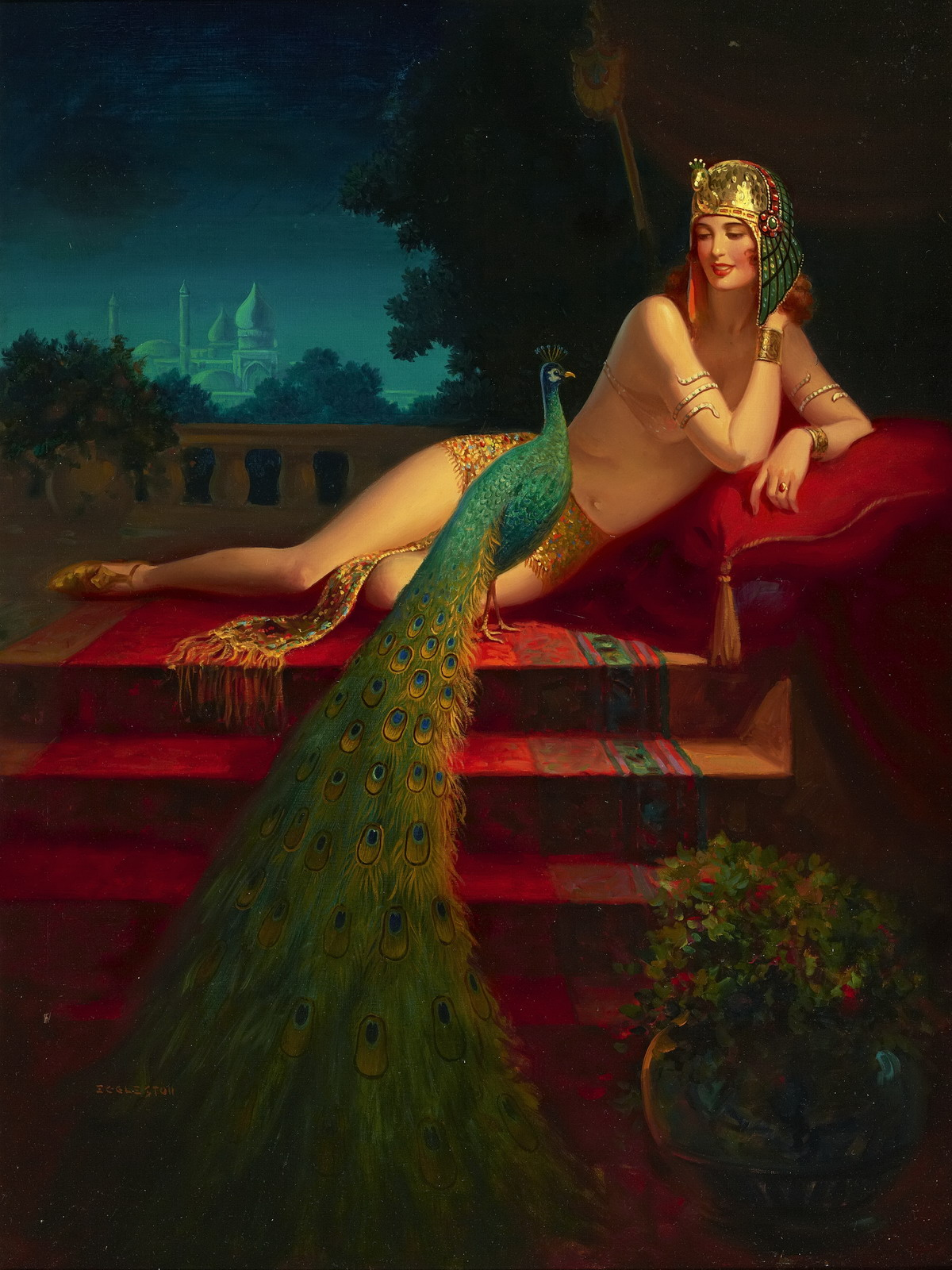
1934 "Cleopatra"

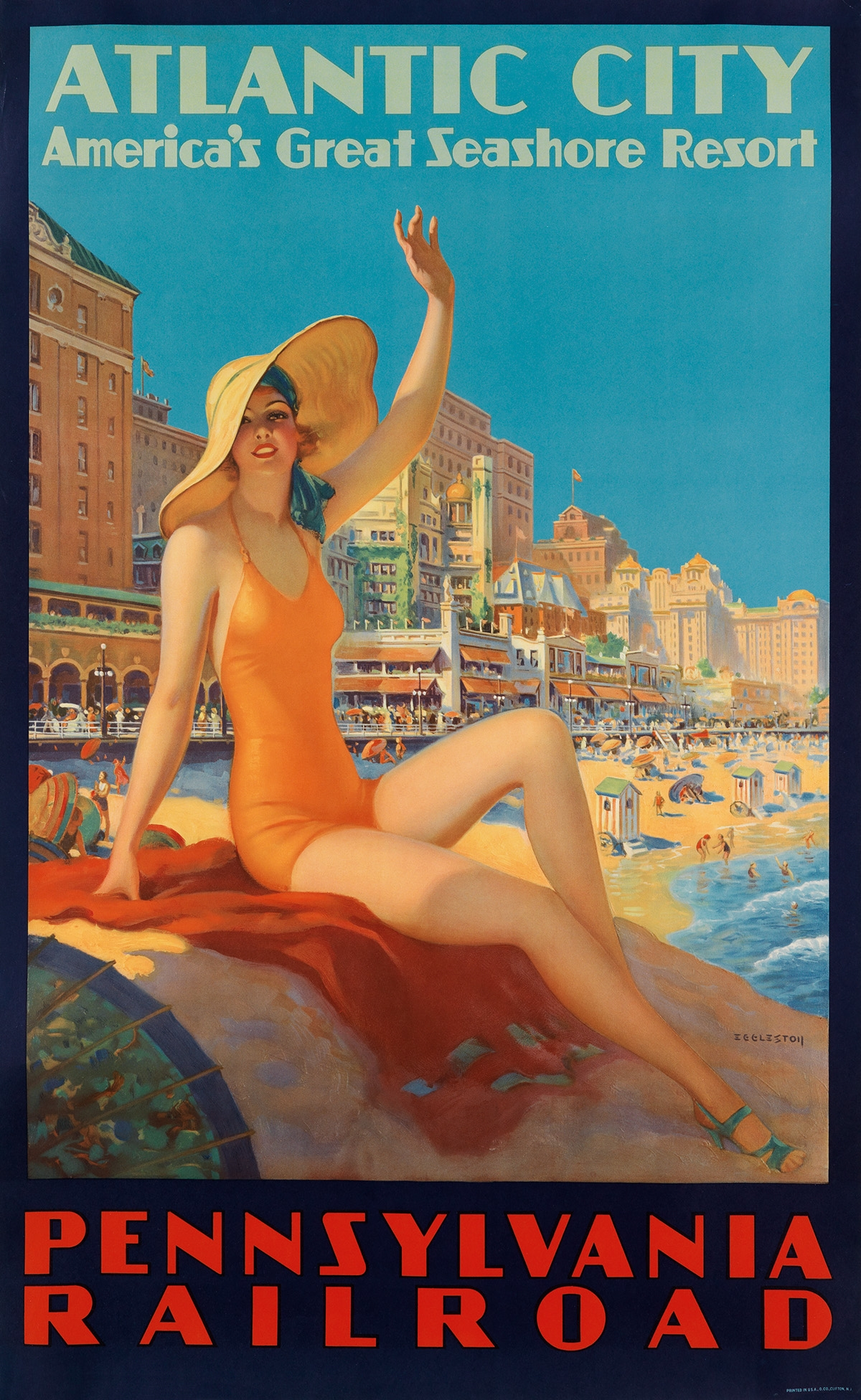
1935 poster for Atlantic City and the Pennsylvania Railroad

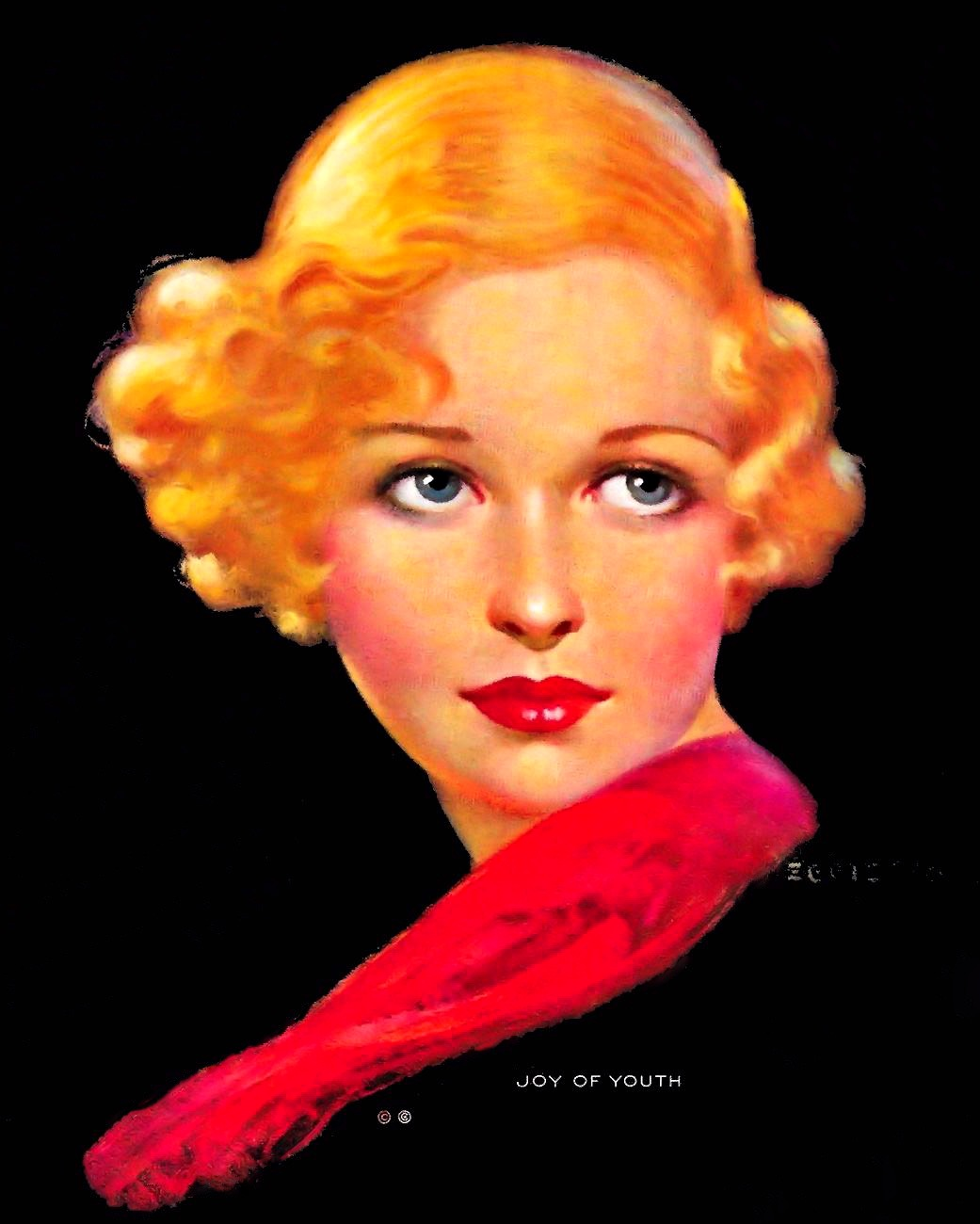
1936 "Joy of Youth"

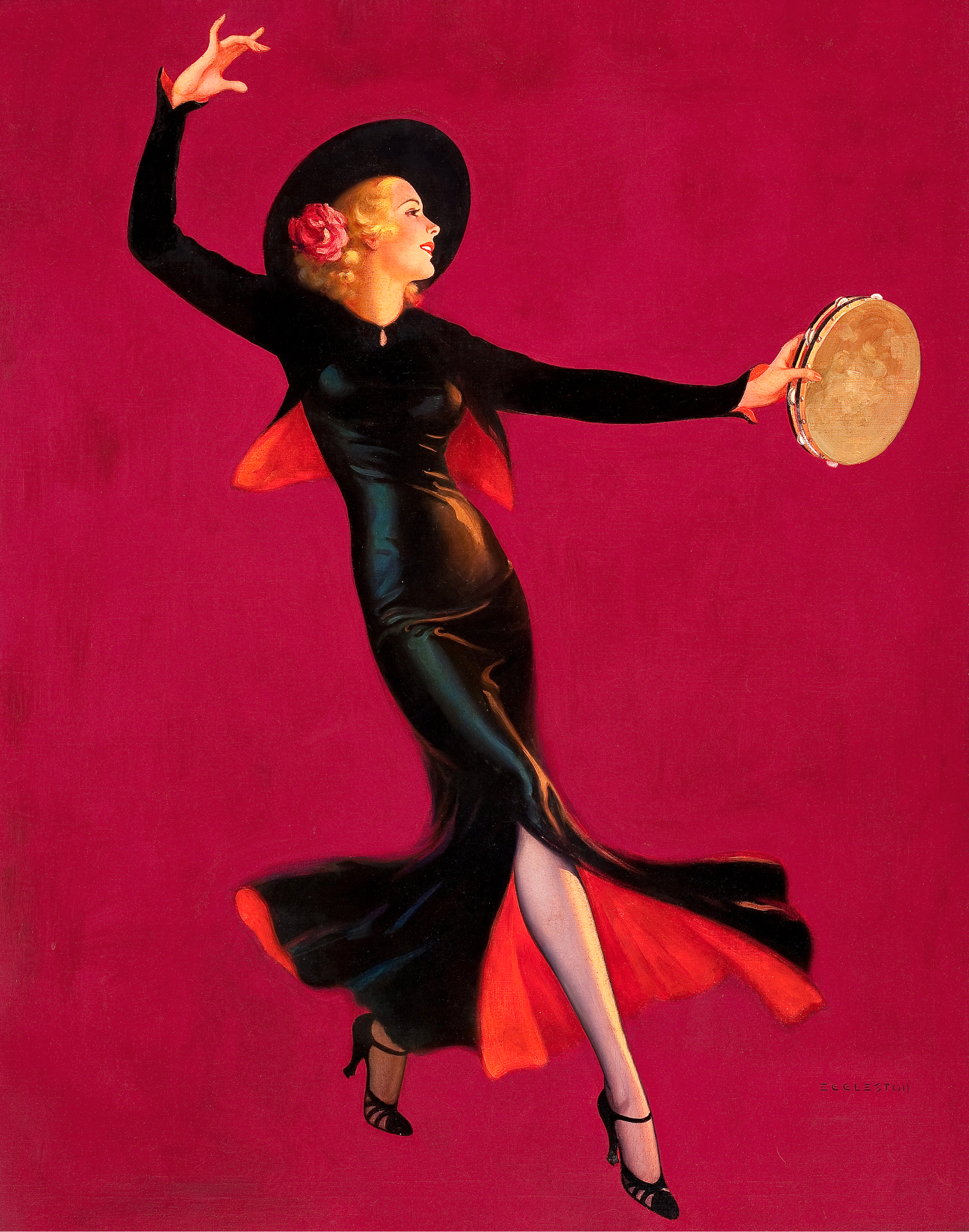
1937 "In the Spotlight"

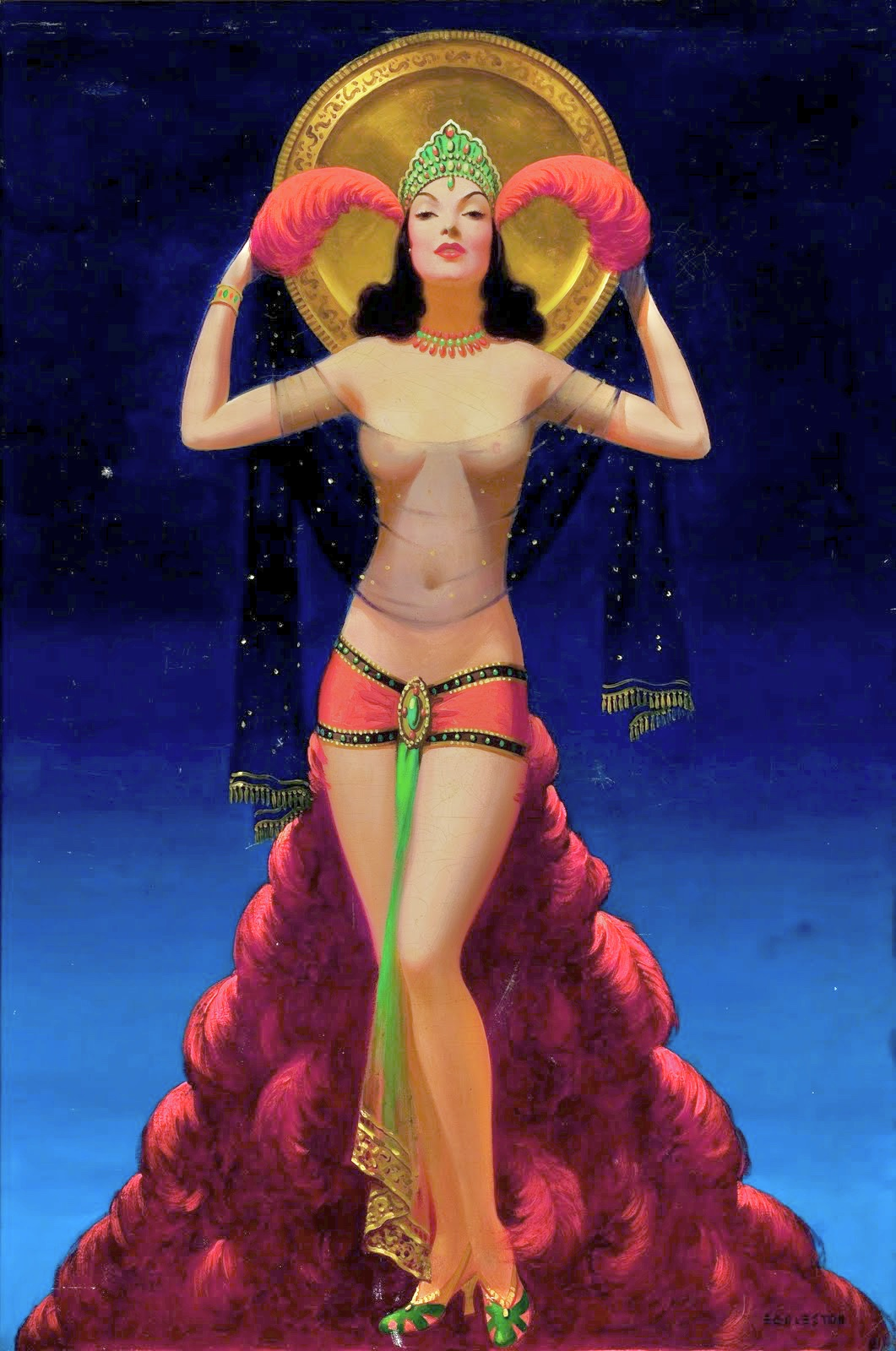
1939 "Lady of Mystery"

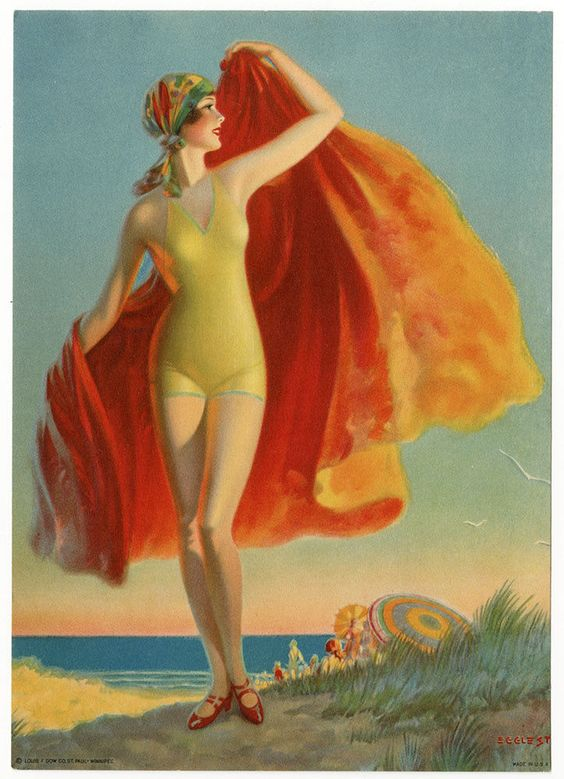
"Sunshine" 1929

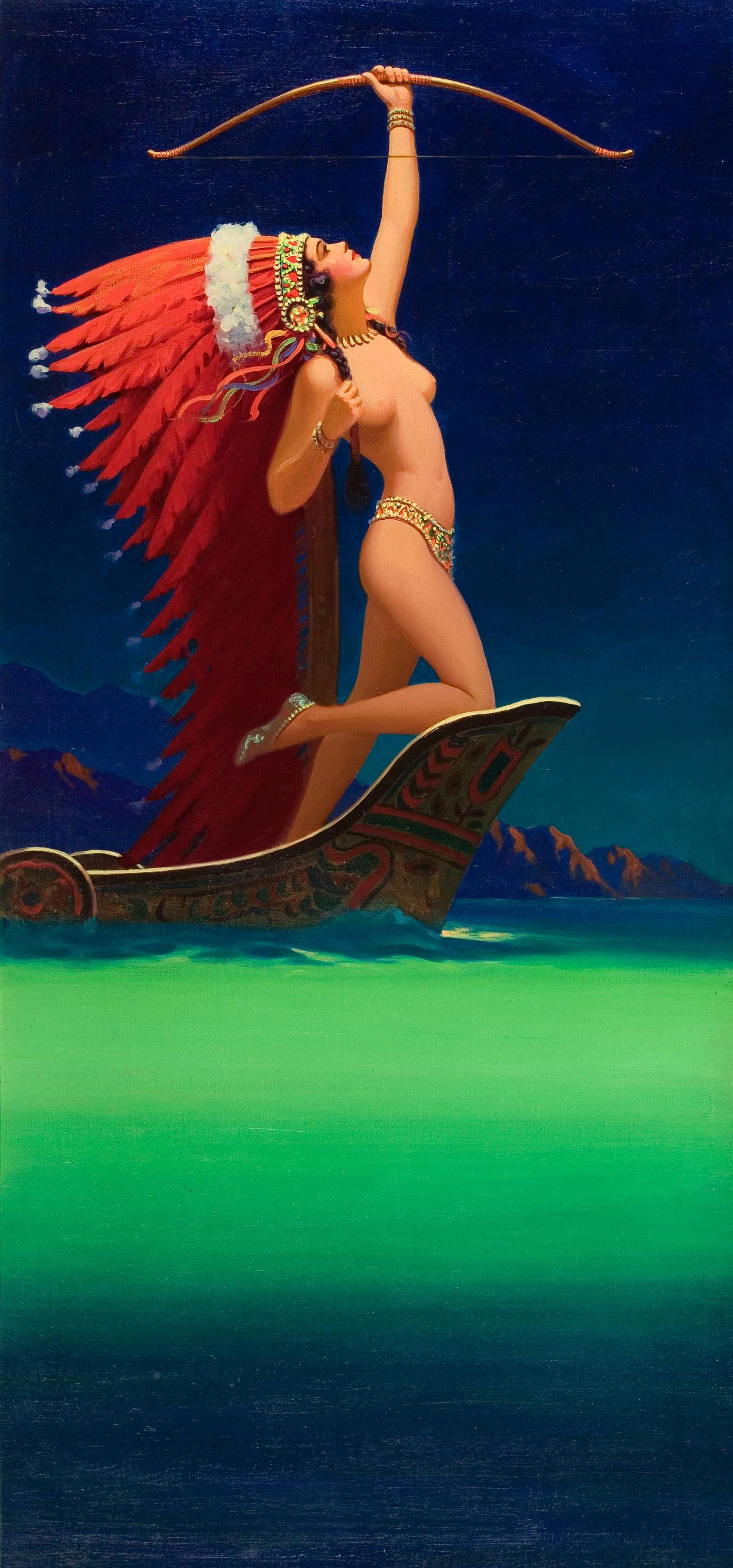
"Flaming Arrow" 1936

== Citations ==
=== General sources ===
- Publication: Artists in Ohio, 1787-1900, a biographical dictionary, Author: Mary Sayre Haverstock Edition/Format: Article: Biography: State or province government publication: English, OCLC Number: 139306892
- Author: Mantle Fielding Edition/Format: Article: Biography: English Publication: Mantle Fielding's Dictionary of American painters, sculptors & engravers. OCLC Number: 70172637
- Lady of Mystery: A Collector's Guide to Edward Eggleston by Norman I. Platnick. The author passed away and his son put this book online for free. He asks a donation to his memory from those that find it useful.
