= Sweetheart of Sigma Chi =

College fraternity song

The cover of a set of sheet music from 1924

Often called the most beloved and popular of college fraternity songs, "The Sweetheart of Sigma Chi" was written in 1911 by Byron D. Stokes (Albion Class of 1913) and F. Dudleigh Vernor (Albion Class of 1914). Stokes had written the words while in class one June day that year, and presented them that afternoon to Vernor, who was practicing the piano in a local house, and composed the music at that time. The song has since become a favorite among ballroom orchestras and was used in two movie musicals of the same name, in 1933 and 1946. When asked about the song's inspiration, Stokes replied, "The 'Sweetheart' is the symbol for the spiritual ingredient in brotherhood. It was the Sigma Chi fraternity itself that inspired the song. I wrote the words not long after my initiation, and the magic of our Ritual with its poetic overtones and undertones was, I suppose, the source of my inspiration". The manuscript of the song remained on campus until 2007 when it was lost and not recovered.

The song was first sung by Harry Clifford (Albion '11), who later drew the cover for the original sheet music published by Vernor's brother Harry Vernor (Albion '13). The song became a big band hit, has been performed in film and television, and continues to be recognized around the world. Through the years, many people have tried to pin the title of "original sweetheart" on many women; however, the two most likely candidates are Elsie Munro (Vernor's girlfriend) and Helen Beall Russell, who lived next to the old chapter house. Either way, since then the concept of the Sweetheart of Sigma Chi has gained popularity all across the world, with the adoption of sweethearts at every chapter and even an international sweetheart.

== Performers ==
- Whitey Kaufman's Original Pennsylvania Serenaders (1925) "The Sweetheart of Sigma Chi" Victor Talking Machine Company 19115-A
- Bernie Schultz and his Crescent Orchestra recorded in Chicago July 19, 1927 for Gennett Records. Released as Gennett 6216 and later as Champion 15323, Challenge 759 and Bell 599
- Ted Lewis and His Band (1927) "The Sweetheart of Sigma Chi" Columbia Records 1296-D
- Gene Austin (1925-1936), "Voice of the Southland"
- Bing Crosby, recorded June 14, 1941 with John Scott Trotter and His Orchestra.
- Dean Martin (1946)
- The Crew Cuts – The Crew Cuts on the Campus (1956)
- Fred Waring and The Pennsylvanians (1956), "College Memories" Decca Records DL 8222
- Burt Bales – On the Waterfront (1959)
- Muzzy Marcellino (?)
- Charles Kullman (c. 1959?), Philips 45 rpm, 'Musical Gems' series, SBF 286
- Ben Webster – The Warm Moods (1960)
- The Kirby Stone Four – Get That Ball (1962)
- Tiny Tim (1968) on "Radio Unnameable"
- Mormon Tabernacle Choir – Stars and Stripes Forever; March Favorites and College Songs (1973, 1978)
- Classic Collection - A Barbershop Album, vol 1 (1982)
- SIGnificant (2007), downloadable from SigmaChi.org

== Lyrics ==
The Sweetheart of Sigma Chi Words by Byron D. Stokes, Albion 1913

When the world goes wrong, as it's bound to do

And you've broken Dan Cupid's bow

And you long for the girl you used to love

the maid of the long ago

Why, light your pipe, bid sorrow avaunt,

Blow the smoke from your altar of dreams

And wreathe the face of your dream-girl there

The love that is just what it seems.

The girl of my dreams is the sweetest girl

Of all the girls I know

Each sweet co-ed, like a rainbow trail

Fades in the after glow

The blue of her eyes and the gold of her hair

Are a blend of the western sky

And the moonlight beams

On the girl of my dreams

She's the Sweetheart of Sigma Chi.

== Movies ==
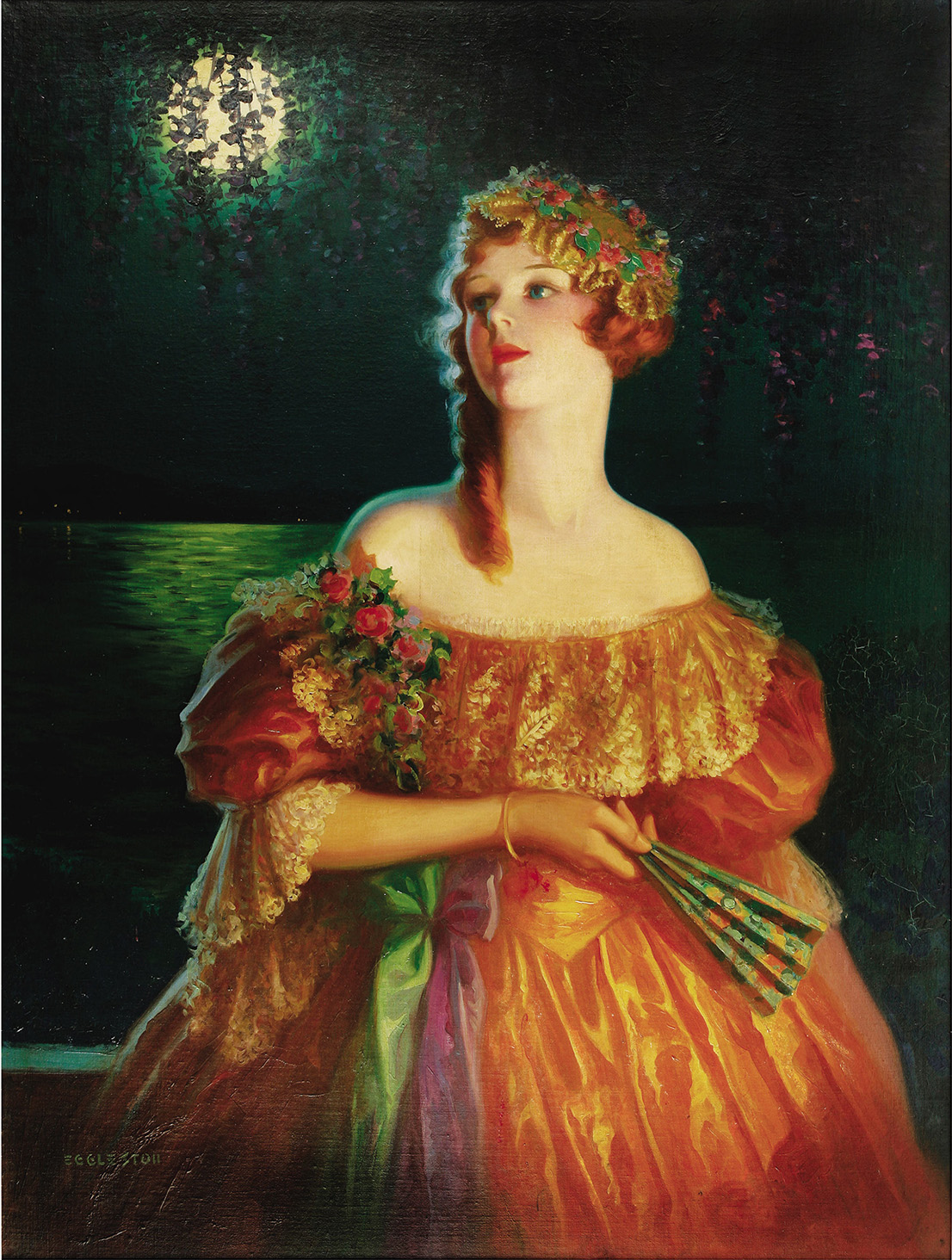
The song may also have inspired the 1919 calendar painting Sweetheart of Sigma Chi by Edward Mason Eggleston.

- The Sweetheart of Sigma Chi (1933)
- Sweetheart of Sigma Chi (1946)
- Deranged (1974) - Ezra Cobb (based on Ed Gein) sings this song as he drives his mother's exhumed corpse home from the cemetery.
- Ghost Story (1981)

== Television ==
- Who's the Boss: Mona (Katherine Helmond) Gets Pinned; Episode 4, Season 1; First aired: Tuesday October 30, 1984; Production Code: 0107 Sung by Dean Butler appearing as Jason and other "Fraternity Brothers"
- Murder, She Wrote: The last half of the song is sung "a capella" at the very beginning of the show by Jessica when she returns to her old Sorority house, along with the House Mother, played by Dinah Shore, who has remained a close friend to Jessica. One of her favorite Professors, and that of many others, is accused of murdering a member of the Sorority (an apparent "piece of work"). Episode 15, Season 5; First aired: March 12, 1989.
