= Television and film in New Jersey =

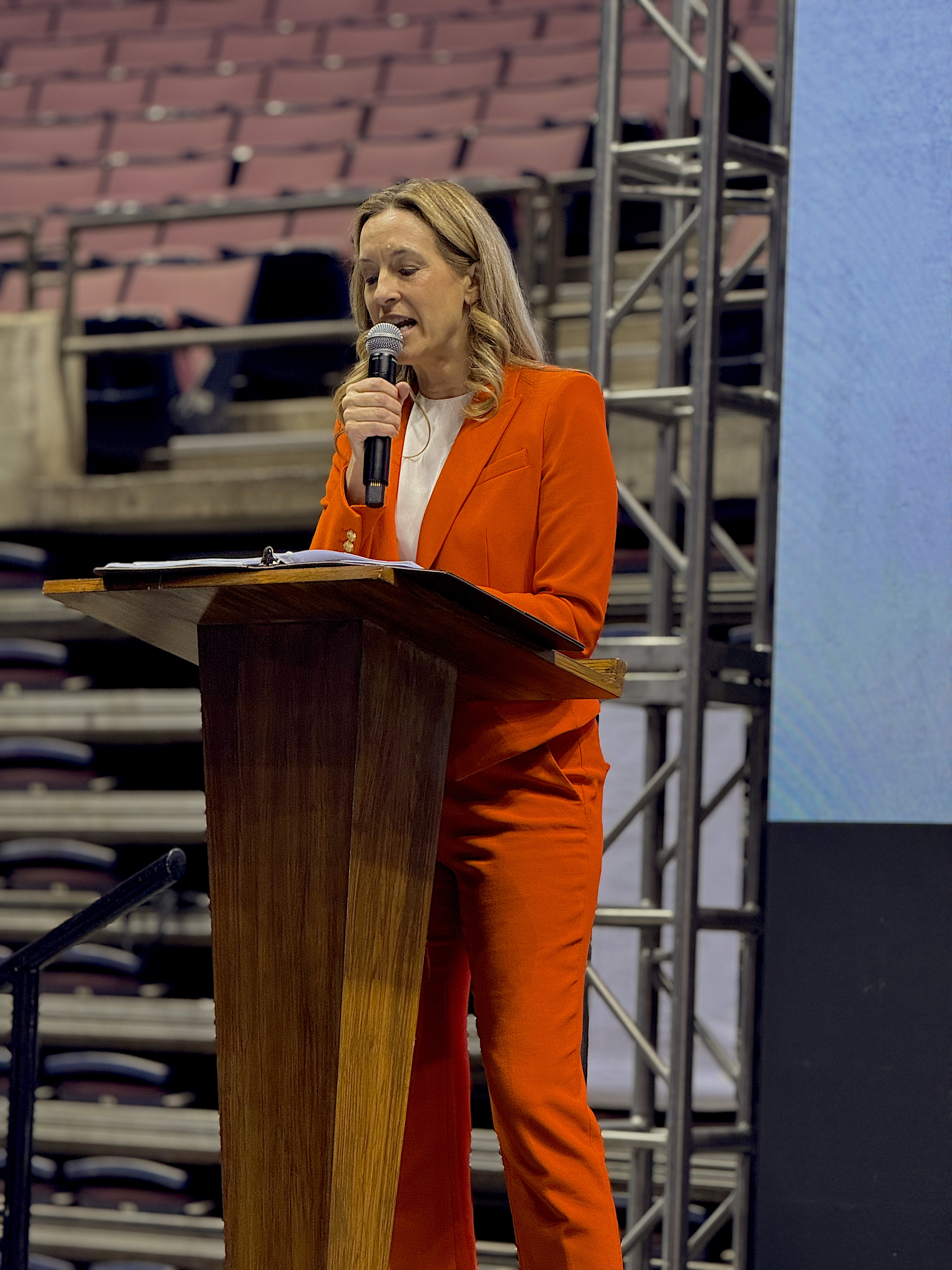
Governor Mikie Sherrill at the 2026 New Jersey Film Expo

There is a long history of television and film in New Jersey, which is considered the birthplace of the American movie picture industry. The first film studio was Black Maria, erected by Thomas Edison in 1893 in West Orange, New Jersey. The second-oldest surviving U.S. motion picture to be copyrighted Fred Ott's Sneeze was filmed there. Edison filmed parts of The Great Train Robbery (1903 film) in New Jersey. In 1907, the first independent motion picture production company in the United States, the Centaur Film Company, was founded in Bayonne, New Jersey. The first drive-in theater was opened in Airport Circle Pennsauken, New Jersey in 1933. One of the first television broadcasts in the United States came from Passaic, New Jersey, in 1928, known as the 1928 DeForest Broadcasts, which were documented in the 1951 film Passaic: Birthplace of Television and the DuMont Story.

Starting with the 2014–15 NBA season, Secaucus, New Jersey, became the official review headquarters of the NBA. All reviews of controversial calls and plays take place in the replay center. Eileen, Marty Supreme, and Happy Gilmore 2 were shot in New Jersey between 2021 and 2025. In 2024, New Jersey accounted for 556 productions filmed in the state, with in-state production reaching 833 million and the hiring of over 30,000 crew members. Netflix is building a massive studio in New Jersey on a 289-acre parcel, to be called Netflix Studios Fort Monmouth, spanning Eatontown, New Jersey and Oceanport, New Jersey. It will be the second-largest production complex owned by Netflix, with a planned opening as early as 2028.

== Film and television "firsts" ==
The roots of the industry started in Newark with Hannibal Goodwin's patent of nitrocellulose film in 1887. Motion picture technology was invented by Thomas Edison, with early work done at his laboratory in West Orange. Edison's Black Maria, the world's first movie studio, is where the first motion picture to be copyrighted in the United States, Fred Ott's Sneeze, was shot.

The Centaur Film Company of Bayonne was the first independent movie studio in the USA. America's first motion picture industry started in 1907 in Fort Lee and the first studio was constructed there in 1909. Alice Guy-Blaché, widely considered to be the world's first female film director, worked in the borough. Oscar Micheaux's film The Exile, the first African-American sound film, was filmed in Fort Lee along with many other Micheaux films.

Fred Wesley Wentworth was commissioned in 1914 by Jacob Fabian to build the Regent in Paterson, one of the first theaters built exclusively for the exhibition of moving pictures. The nation's first drive-in theater opened at Airport Circle in 1933.

DuMont Laboratories in Passaic, developed early sets and made the first broadcast to the private home, documented in Passaic: Birthplace of Television and the DuMont Story (1951).

== New Jersey Motion Picture and Television Commission ==
The New Jersey Motion Picture & Television Commission was established in 1976.

Many television shows and motion picture films have been filmed in New Jersey, with incentives offered by the state.

When Governor Phil Murphy took office in 2018 he reinstated the New Jersey Film & Digital Media Tax Credit Program, which had been suspended by the previous administration. It was expanded in 2020. The benefits include a 30% tax credit on film projects and a 40% subsidy for studio developments. Murphy signed legislation in January 2023 increasing the state's digital media content production tax credit to 35% of qualified expenses purchased through vendors in South Jersey and Mercer County. In addition, the bill increased the cumulative annual limitation on digital media content production tax credits from $10 million to $30 million. Beginning in fiscal year 2025, the bill also allows an additional $100 million in tax credits for New Jersey film-lease partners from tax credits authorized under other incentive programs.

New Jersey launched its Film Ready Program in 2023, which encourages municipalities and counties to be "film ready", to incentivize film and television producers to film in those towns. Municipalities and counties undertake a certification process to become "film ready". As of August 2025, there are 43 film ready communities.

== Studio complexes ==
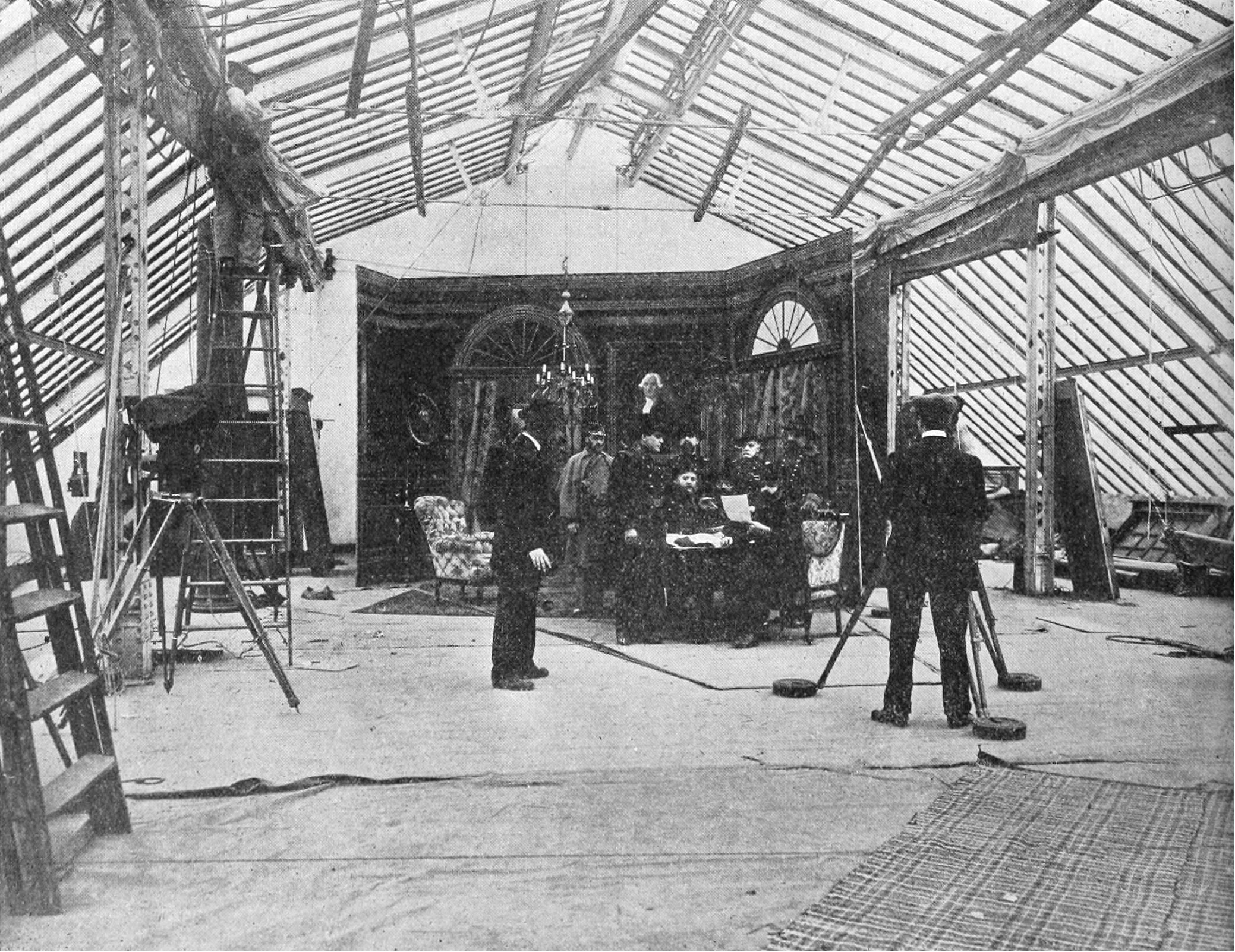
Filming at the Pathé American studio in Jersey City Heights (1912)

Fort Lee is home to America's first motion picture industry. A large number of early films, many silent, were shot at studios and on location in and around the town. With the first constructed in 1909, there were 11 major studios in Fort Lee by 1918.

The floor space and height of the Jersey City Armory has led to its use as a temporary studio for many projects, including Robert De Niro's A Bronx Tale, the Faye Dunaway thriller Eyes Of Laura Mars and Laura Brannigan's music video "Self-Control". The expansive floor and high ceilings of the Teaneck Armory has been used for numerous film shoots, including Sweet and Lowdown, You've Got Mail, Bogus, and Stonewall.

In 2010, a new Studio City New Jersey was opened in Trenton, and in 2011, the Ironbound Film and Television Studio was opened in Newark.

After the closure of the Meadowlands Arena as a sports and entertainment venue, NBC leased the space and converted it to a major film studio in 2019.

Criterion Group converted a warehouse in Jersey City to the state's largest film studio named Caven Point Studio; it has with three soundstages. In February 2021, Palisade Stages opened its 23,000 square feet studio in Kearny. Supor Studio City in Harrison was converted from seven existing buildings into studios. Another studio opened on Kearny Point in 2022, 10 Basin Studios.

In October 2021, Netflix announced its intention to bid for a redevelopment of a 289-acre parcel at Fort Monmouth to turn it into Netflix's second-largest production complex. Netflix was the top bidder and the plan for the Netflix Studios Fort Monmouth was approved in 2024 with the expected closing date in 2027 and the campus was planned to be completed between 2034 and 2037.

In March 2022, Township of West Orange announced a partnership with, a studio design and development company, MBS Group, to redevelop properties adjacent to Thomas Edison's Laboratory to build up to eight sound studios. In April 2024, West Orange officially approved the studio, which will consist of three to six production stages spanning 20,000 to 30,000 square feet each, as well as office and support spaces, and a large parking facility.

Construction of a major studio at Bergen Point is a planned project in Bayonne. Called 1888 Studios, it will be the largest in New Jersey and the largest ground-up movie studio complex in North America.

In 2022, the city of Newark announced that a major new film and television production studio to be called "Lionsgate Newark Studios," would open in 2024 on the 15-acre former Seth Boyden Terrace housing project site at 101 Center Terrace in the Dayton section in the city's South Ward. Lionsgate Newark will partner on public relations and community affairs with the New Jersey Performing Arts Center. With this project, Lionsgate became the first to be designated as a state's studio partner which would allow the company to capture additional tax benefits up to $100 million set aside for up to three studio partners.

In 2023, ACX1 Studios announced that it planned to convert the 550,000-square-foot Playground Pier in Atlantic City into a live entertainment and production studio with several ready-to-shoot movie sets.

In 2024, New Jersey Economic Development Authority awarded $9.5 million grants to local municipalities for road, power transmission, and water infrastructure to support developments of new sound stages and production facilities. Those projects included the 1.2 million-square-foot Carteret Stages in Carteret, a 280,000-square-foot studio facility in Jersey City developed by Mana Contemporary, an expansion of Caven Point Studio with three new sound stages in Jersey City, a development of 185,000 square feet sound stages by Atlantic Picture Motion Studios in Egg Harbor City, and a television studio in East Brunswick.

In 2026, Alan Mruvka announced plans for Filmology Labs to open at the Padded Wagon Building in the historic silk mill complex at 61 State Street in Paterson.

== New Jersey Film Expo ==
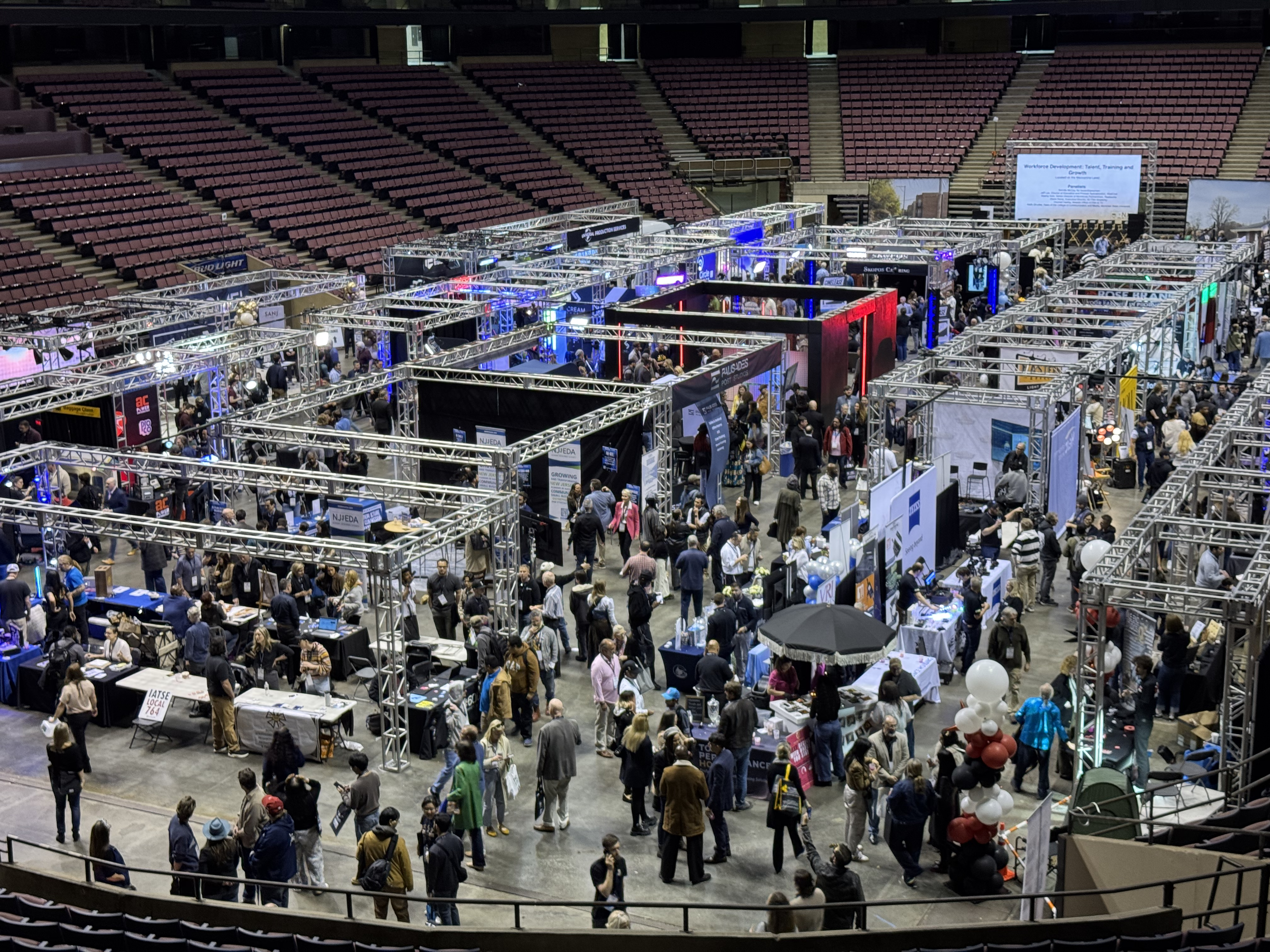
Exhibition Space of the 2026 New Jersey Film Expo

The New Jersey Film Expo is an annual event hosted by the Screen Alliance of New Jersey (SANJ). The event takes place at the Meadowlands Arena. The first film expo was held on May 1, 2025, and the event drew over 3,000 people and hosted over 80 vendors. Some of the vendors included Arri, Zeiss, Eastern Effects, Palisades Post Productions, and the IATSE. The purpose of the expo is to promote film and television production in New Jersey. Various lectures throughout the day highlighted the economic incentives for filmmakers, promoting tax credits and increased revenue for local entrepreneurs. The expo was motivated by the 556 productions filmed in New Jersey in 2024, with in-state production reaching $833 million and the hiring of over 30,000 crew members.

The second expo was hosted on April 30, 2026. The exposition had 4500 visitors and 90 vendors featuring a keynote address by the Governor of New Jersey Mikie Sherrill. A key sponsor for the event was Jon Crowley, the executive director of the New Jersey Motion Picture and Television Commission. Throughout the day, the event featured panels from the commission titled Powering Production from Script to Scene. Other panel subjects included workforce development, tips for filming in New Jersey, unions, sustainability, and technology. The Coalition for American Productions featured a panel on national tax incentives. A major vendor in 2026 was Netflix, promoting their new massive studio, which is under construction in Fort Monmouth, New Jersey.

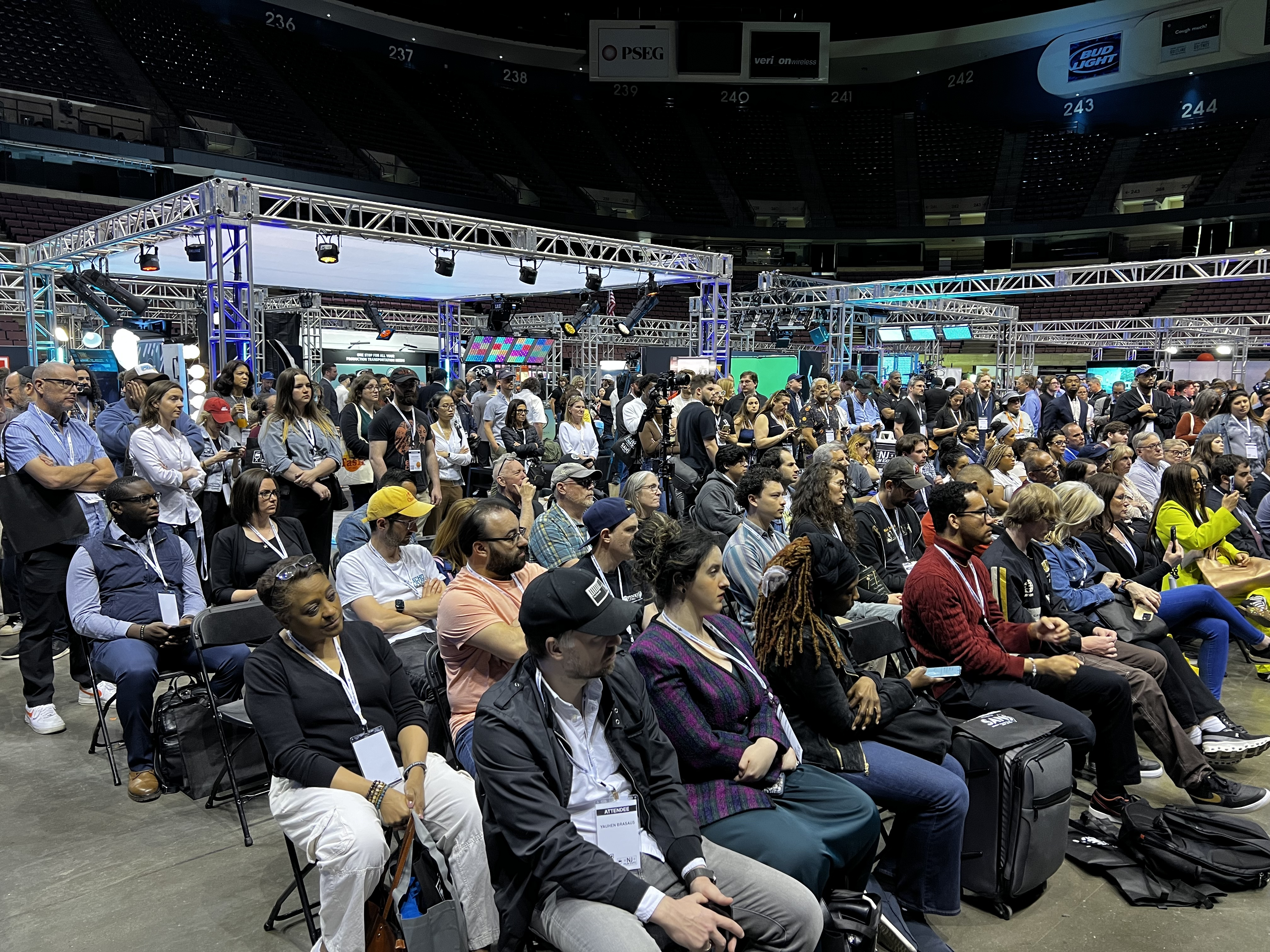
Panel Audience at the 2025 New Jersey Film Expo

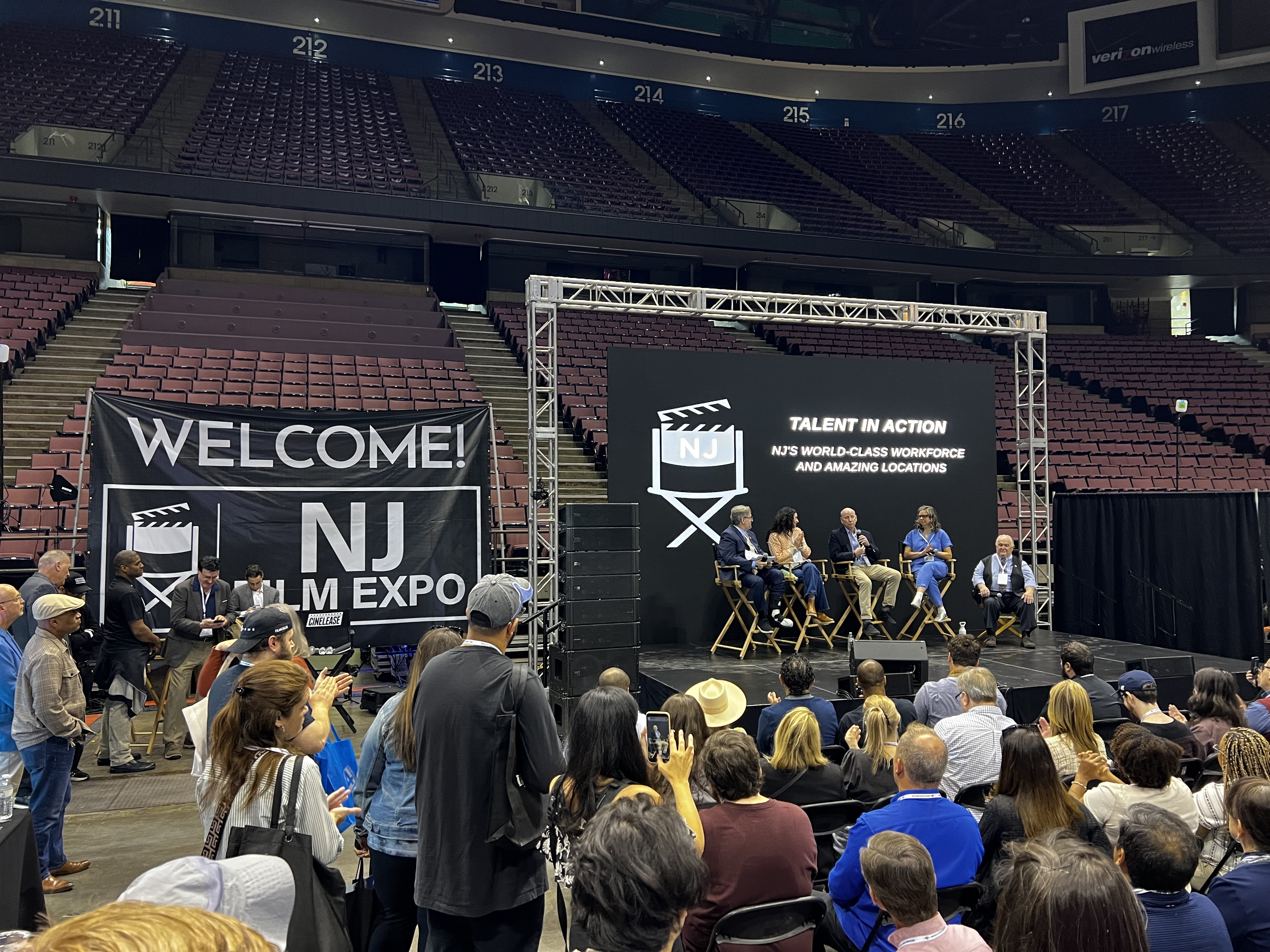
Panel at 2025 NJ Film Expo

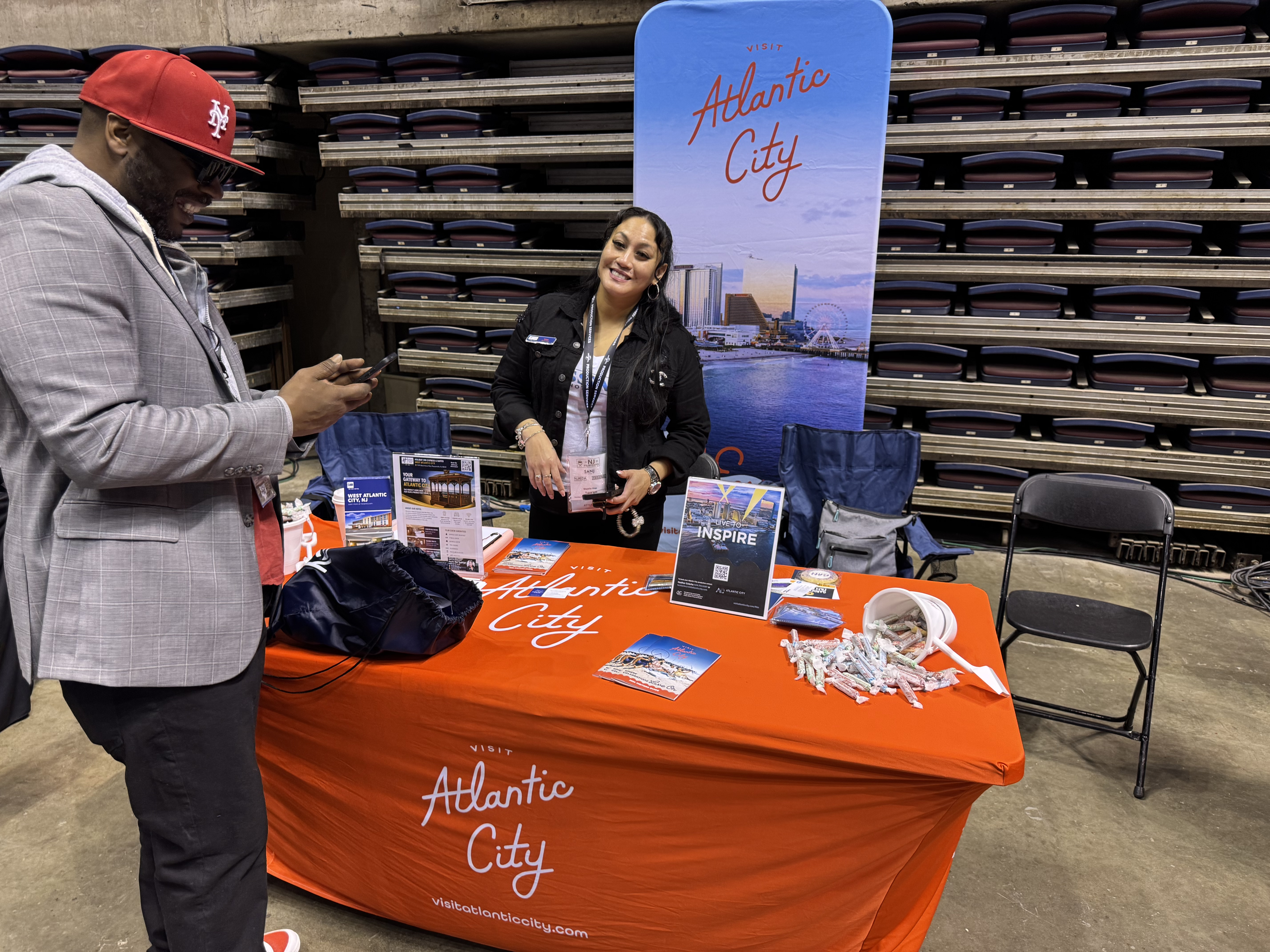
Atlantic City representative at the 2026 New Jersey Film Expo

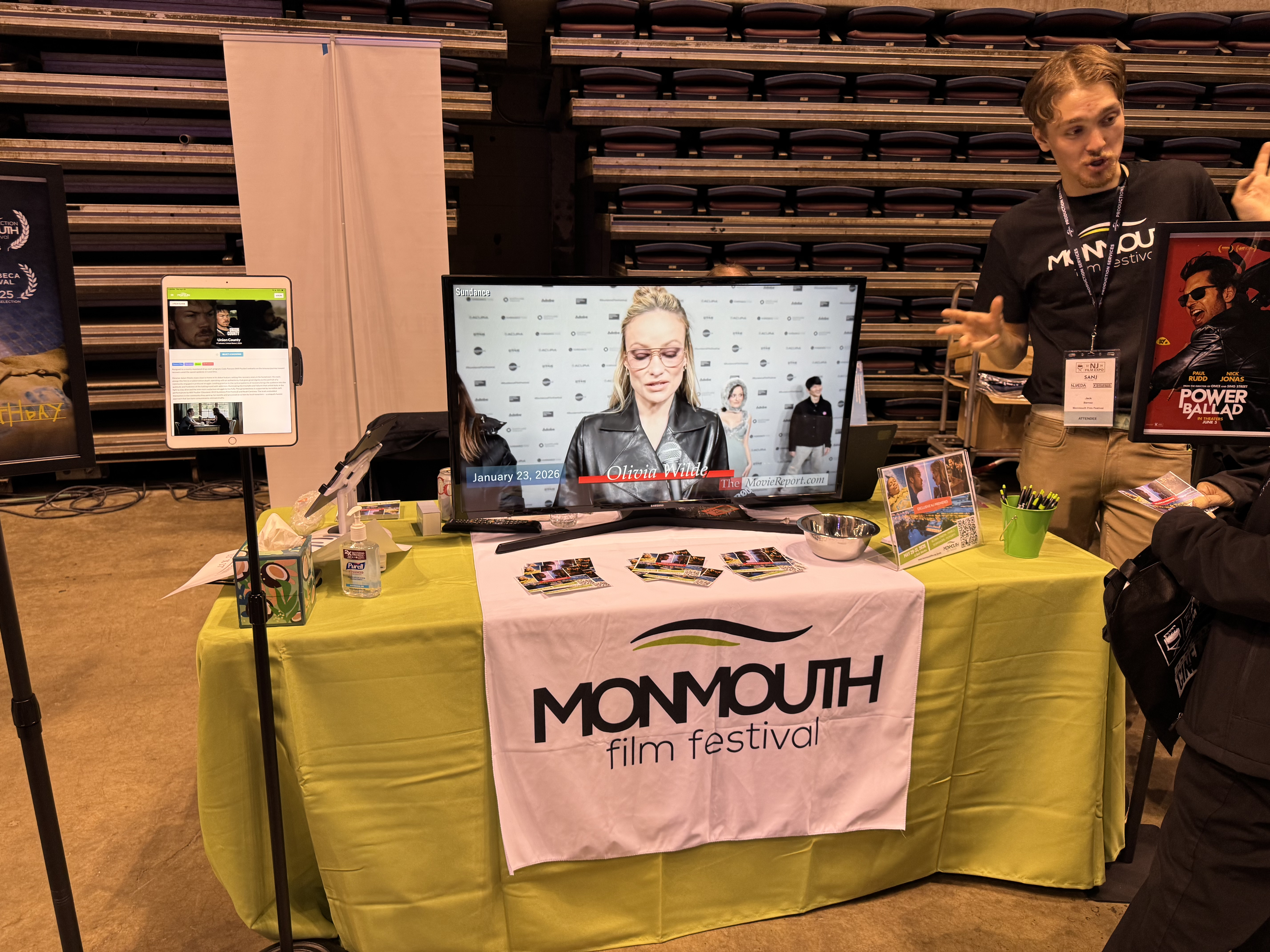
Monmouth Film Festival at the 2026 New Jersey Film Expo

== Labor unions and entertainment guilds ==
A large swath of the state is within the "thirty-mile zone" around Columbus Circle in New York, allowing productions to save on travel cost obligations because a shoot is in the same zone as personnel's residences. Entertainment industry labor unions use the studio zone to determine per diem rates, work rules, and workers' compensation for union workers. Portions of Hudson, Essex, and Bergen counties are in the 8-mile SAG-AFTRA zone running from same location.

== Filmmaking programs ==
Rutgers University established the Rutgers Filmmaking Center in New Brunswick in 2011. Though it is a relatively new program, the program has been ranked highly among the nation's film schools. Variety named it “one of the top programs in the United States."

== Networks based in New Jersey ==
- NJ PBS (known as NJTV until 2021) is a statewide public television network owned by the New Jersey Public Broadcasting Authority and operated by Montclair State University
  - The New Jersey Network (NJN) operated public television until June 30, 2011, when it ended operations and its television stations were transferred to WNET until 2026.
- Cable network CNBC originates most of its in-studio programming from Englewood Cliffs. Sister news network MSNBC broadcast from studios in Secaucus from 1997 until late 2007, when the network moved to Rockefeller Center's GE Building in a cost-cutting measure by parent company NBC Universal.
- The MLB Network moved into the former MSNBC studios in Secaucus in 2009.
- MyNetworkTV flagship station WWOR-TV (Channel 9) is licensed to and broadcasts from Secaucus; former owner RKO General moved the New York-based station across the Hudson in 1983 in an unsuccessful attempt to retain the station's license.
- WNET is licensed to Newark

Cable and Satellite

- CNBC
- MLB Network
- NBA TV
- News 12 New Jersey
- NHL Network

VHF stations (digital)

- Channel 8: WNJB - (PBS) "NJ PBS"
- Channel 9: WWOR-TV - (My Network TV) - Secaucus
- Channel 13: WNET - (PBS) - Newark

UHF stations (digital)

- Channel 33: WJLP - (MeTV) - Middletown Township (transmits on channel 3, but mapped to channel 33 on FCC order)
- Channel 34: WPXO-LD (low power) - (América Tevé) - East Orange
- Channel 39: WDVB-CA - (Independent) - Edison
- Channel 41: WXTV-DT - (Univision) - Paterson
- Channel 47: WNJU - (Telemundo) - Linden
- Channel 50: WNJN - (PBS) "NJ PBS"
- Channel 58: WNJB - (PBS) "NJ PBS"
- Channel 63: WMBC-TV - (Independent) - Newton
- Channel 68: WFUT-DT - (UniMás) - Newark

== Television shows filmed in New Jersey ==
- The Street "The first television series to be shot entirely in New Jersey..."
- Bar Karma
- The opening of the NBC comedy Ed was filmed in Hillsdale and Westfield, New Jersey.
- The Bravo TV series Real Housewives of New Jersey is a reality show based on the daily lives of five New Jersey women living in Franklin Lakes.
- The television drama The Sopranos depicts the life of a New Jersey organized crime family and is filmed on location at various places throughout the state. Series creator and writer-director David Chase grew up in Clifton and North Caldwell.
- The HBO series Boardwalk Empire, a historical drama set during the prohibition era, takes place in Atlantic City, New Jersey, with a few scenes filmed in the state
- The HBO prison drama Oz was filmed in an old warehouse in Bayonne, with much of the series filmed around the now-defunct Military Ocean Terminal Base.
- The NBC drama Law and Order: Special Victims Unit filmed police station and courtroom scenes at NBC's Central Archives building in North Bergen, and filmed other scenes throughout the county, such as a 2010 episode filmed at the Meadowlands Parkway in Secaucus.
- The television medical drama House is set in New Jersey and takes place at the fictional Princeton Plainsboro Teaching Hospital. Overhead images of the building are actually the Frist Campus Center at Princeton University.
- In his comedy special What Am I Doing in New Jersey?, filmed at the Park Theater, George Carlin comments that he believes New Jersey deserves the title "Toll Booth Capital of the United States of America". He also suggests changing the state nickname from "The Garden State" to "The Toll Booth State".
- The NBC show Ed was based in the fictional town of Stuckeyville, Ohio, but filmed in various locations in New Jersey. Stuckeybowl, one of the main settings of the show and where they also had numerous sets, was located in Northvale, New Jersey before it was demolished in 2006.
- The Adventures of Pete & Pete, set in the fictional town of Wellesville in an unnamed state, was filmed in New Jersey. Originally, the school scenes were shot in Bayonne and the neighborhood scenes in South Orange, and Leonia. For the third season, production took place in Cranford. The occasional New Jersey Transit Bus or other such object in a shot would occasionally give this fact away.
- NBC's medical drama Mercy is set in the fictional Mercy Hospital in Jersey City. The short-lived hospital drama was filmed at a warehouse in Secaucus, a private residence in Weehawken and a public school in Jersey City.
- The MTV reality show Jersey Shore (TV series) takes place in Seaside Heights, New Jersey as well as other South Jersey locales during seasons 1 and 3.
- Cake Boss
- The CW action-thriller television series Nikita is set in and around New Jersey.
- Wake Up with Marci on CBS owned WLNY-TV 10/55 talk show empowering women
- Severance filmed in Bell Works in Holmdel, which served as Lumon HQ in the show. Filming also occurred in Middletown and Alpine.

== Motion pictures filmed in New Jersey ==
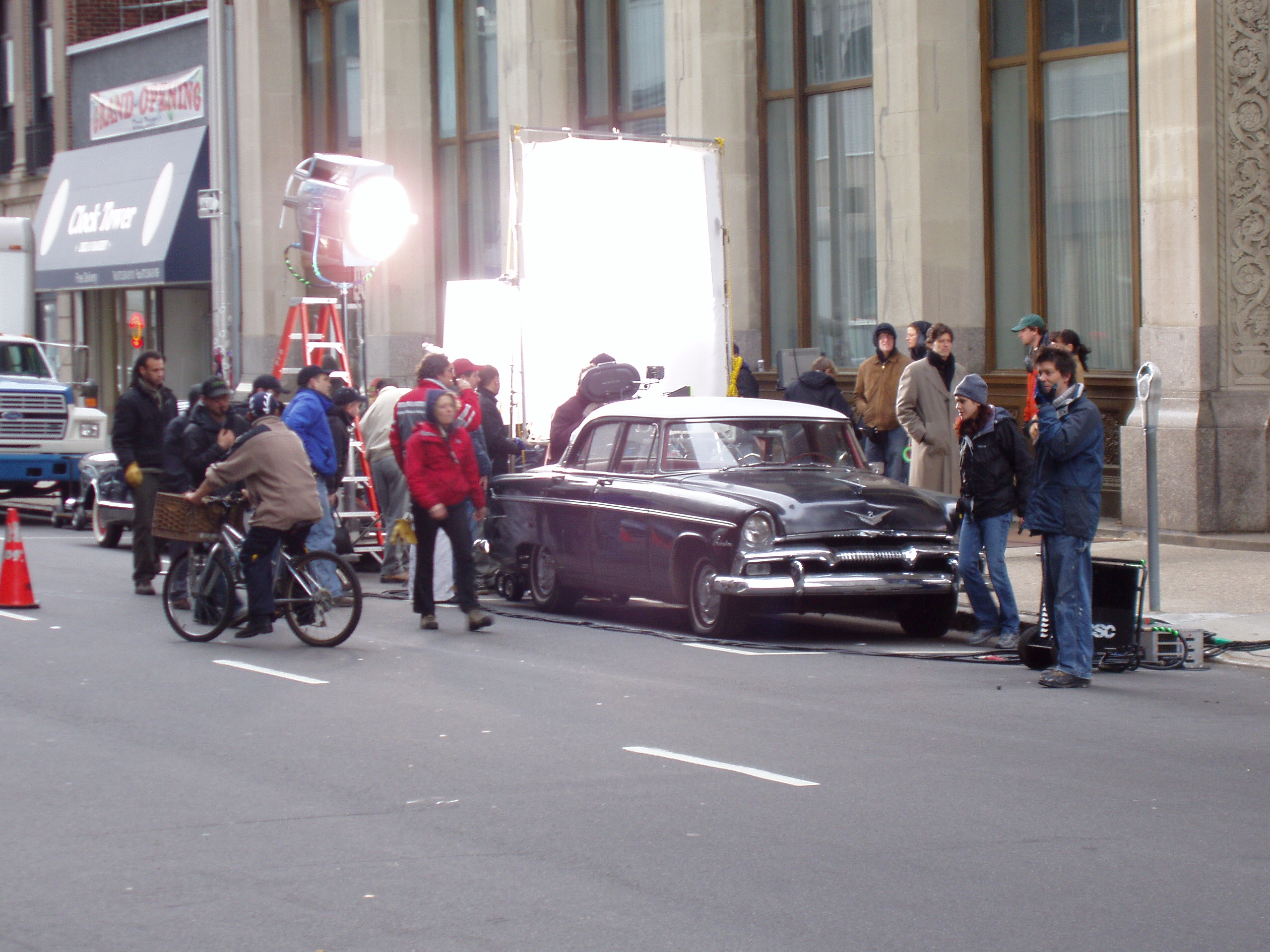
On location in Newark, 2004

=== Locations ===
- Coyote Ugly was filmed in South Amboy, NJ.
- The Family Stone starring Diane Keaton, Sarah Jessica Parker, Amy Adams, Luke Wilson and Craig T. Nelson was filmed on location in Madison, NJ.
- The Great Train Robbery, 1903
- The 1979 film The Amityville Horror was filmed in Toms River and the scene in the church was filmed in Point Pleasant Beach.
- The original Friday the 13th horror movie was filmed at Camp NoBeBoSco in Blairstown as the setting for Camp Crystal Lake.
- The Family Man, starring Nicolas Cage, was filmed in Teaneck in 2000.
- In the 1996 science fiction film Independence Day the scene in which Jeff Goldblum and Judd Hirsch are playing chess was filmed in West New York.
- The title character in The Toxic Avenger is often touted as the first superhero from New Jersey.
- In the 2005 film adaptation of War of the Worlds, the beginning of the movie is set in New Jersey, an homage to the 1938 radio broadcast.
- The film World Trade Center, starring Nicolas Cage, had numerous scenes shot in Glen Rock, New Jersey
- The 2004 film Garden State was set and filmed in New Jersey. It was written, directed and starred in by Zach Braff, who grew up in New Jersey. The film's title refers to the state's nickname.
- Director Kevin Smith's movies have a recurring set of characters (most famously Jay and Silent Bob) who nearly all of come from New Jersey (primarily the "tri-town" area of Atlantic Highlands, Leonardo, and Red Bank). The state appears in all of Smith's films, and his first three films, Clerks, Mallrats and Chasing Amy, were dubbed the "New Jersey Trilogy." The short-lived animated spinoff spawned by Clerks also took place in the same locations as the movie. Smith's subsequent efforts, Dogma, Jersey Girl, Jay and Silent Bob Strike Back, and Clerks II all had scenes taking place in various New Jersey locales.
- The Ron Howard film Cinderella Man and the Elia Kazan film On the Waterfront both take place in the old Hudson County docks.
- Although not credited, at least one scene from The Godfather (1972) was filmed in New Jersey. The scene in which Clemenza states the famous line, "Leave the gun. Take the cannolis," was filmed in the marsh along the Hudson River in Jersey City, just west of the Statue of Liberty, in what is now Liberty State Park.
- Sorcerer (1977), directed by William Friedkin, Stars: Roy Scheider, Bruno Cremer and Francisco Rabal, The beginning scenes of the movie were filmed in Elizabeth, NJ.
- Daddy Warbucks' mansion from the 1982 movie Annie was built in 1929 by Hubert Parson, the president of F.W. Woolworth. He called it Shadow Lawn. Now it is Woodrow Wilson Hall, owned by Monmouth University at West Long Branch, NJ.
- Also in Annie, the raised bridge that Rooster chases Annie up is located in East Newark, NJ.
- The 1982 film The World According to Garp includes a scene that was shot around characters in two cars on the Rutgers main campus in New Brunswick even though the film is set in New England.
- The 1983 film Eddie and the Cruisers was filmed mostly in Somers Point and Ocean City.
- The Adventures of Buckaroo Banzai Across the 8th Dimension (1984) was set in New Brunswick, and includes a scene set in "Greasy Tony's"—a real Rutgers-area eatery.
- The 1988 comedy film Big starring Tom Hanks, was filmed in Cliffside Park.
- The 1989 film Lean on Me took place in Paterson, New Jersey
- Goodfellas, the 1990 Martin Scorsese film about the mob, had some scenes filmed on location in Fort Lee.
- The 1993 film Coneheads was set and filmed in Paramus.
- The 1994 film I.Q., about Albert Einstein's attempt to play matchmaker for his niece, was filmed in Princeton, Lawrenceville, Cranbury, and Rocky Hill.
- Although depicting Newark's notorious car theft rate, the 1995 film New Jersey Drive was shot in East Orange, Elizabeth, and Paterson, as well as Brooklyn, Harlem, and Queens, New York.
- The 1997 film Big Night was shot in the bayshore towns of Keyport and Keansburg.
- The film Cop Land (1997) was filmed in Fort Lee, Cliffside Park, Teaneck and Edgewater.
- The 1998 film One True Thing, starring Meryl Streep, Renée Zellweger, and William Hurt, was filmed in the towns of Maplewood, Morristown, and at Princeton University.
- 2001's A Beautiful Mind had several scenes shot at both Princeton University and Fairleigh Dickinson University (Madison campus). The movie is a biopic of the mathematician John Nash, who resided in Princeton, New Jersey until his death in 2015.
- Although supposedly set in New York City, the 2003 movie School of Rock was filmed primarily in Edison and Mahwah, perhaps due to the significance these towns have on rock music.
- The 2004 Sundance Film Festival favorite Garden State (starring Zach Braff and Natalie Portman) was shot on location in Maplewood and South Orange.
- The 2004 stoner film Harold & Kumar Go to White Castle took place in New Jersey. Several locations seen in the movie include Princeton University, Newark, New Brunswick, and a fictional White Castle in Cherry Hill.
- The movie War of the Worlds was filmed in many locations in New Jersey, including Bayonne, Howell Township and Newark. The infamous radio show broadcast starring Orson Welles, The War of the Worlds was set in Grover's Mill (a section of West Windsor Township) and other locations around New Jersey.
- The film The Wrestler took place in Elizabeth, New Jersey and was filmed throughout there and the rest of the state.
- The film The Wedding Singer starring Adam Sandler and Drew Barrymore takes place in Ridgefield, New Jersey. The Broadway Musical of the same title starring Stephen Lynch as Robbie Hart and Laura Benanti as Julia Sullivan also takes place in Ridgefield.
- The film The Station Agent was filmed and took place in Newfoundland, New Jersey.
- Be Kind Rewind took place in Passaic, New Jersey.
- The Hurricane (1999 film), various locations including East Jersey State Prison and Hudson County Courthouse
- The online web-series "EverymanHYBRID" is set and produced prominently in and around Hamilton and Princeton, NJ.
- At the beginning of the 2010 film Morning Glory, Rachel McAdams' character is the producer of fictional morning show Good Morning New Jersey, filmed at MediaMix Studios in Allendale, New Jersey.
- Tráfico: Every Body Has a Price, a TV series about human trafficking in the United States, is shot in Roselle, NJ.
- Radium Girls (2018)
- The short film Meet Me in the Ironbound was filmed on location at numerous Newark locations.
- Happy Gilmore 2 was filmed throughout the state
- The 2025 biographical comedy-drama film, Nonnas, was filmed in various locations in New Jersey, including Jersey City, Hoboken, Bayonne, Paterson, Linden, Elizabeth, and Edison.

== See also ==
- 1937 Fox vault fire
- List of movies based on location
- List of people from New Jersey
- View Askewniverse
