= Lionsgate Newark Studios =

Film and television production studio

Coordinates: 40.69551°N 74.20106°W

- Company type: Studio
- Industry: Entertainment
- Founded: 2022
- Founders: Great Point Studios
- Headquarters: 101 Center Terrace, Newark, New Jersey 07114
- Products: Motion pictures, television programs
- Parent: Lionsgate Studios
- Website: lionsgate.com

Lionsgate Newark Studios is a 350,000 square foot film and television production studio under construction in Newark, New Jersey. It is located in Dayton in the South Ward on 15 acres (6.1 ha) of land overlooking Weequahic Golf Course west of Newark Liberty International Airport.

Lionsgate is to be the key tenant with naming rights, and the project is being built by Great Point Studios.

The studio is billed as the first purpose-built studio in New Jersey to be constructed for TV and film production using tax credits. It includes five soundstages ranging from 20,000 to 30,000 square feet and additional space for on-site production support services such as catering, offices, and prop handling.

== Development ==
In 2022, the city of Newark, New Jersey announced that a major new film and television production studio would open in 2024 on the 15-acre former Seth Boyden housing projects site (along New Jersey Route 27) in the Dayton section of the city. It is adjacent to Weequahic Park and Weequahic Golf Course near Evergreen Cemetery and the airport. Governor Phil Murphy and Mayor Ras Baraka praised the project.

The venture is billed as likely to generate up to 600 jobs and up to $800 million in economic impact for Newark and the state.

In 2024, the Port Authority of New York and New Jersey announced that Newark Liberty International Airport rail station, which had been inaccessible to the neighborhood, would be opened to allow rail travel to and from the neighborhood from New York City and points west.

== See also ==
- 1888 Studios
- Caven Point Studio
- Netflix Studios Fort Monmouth
- Filmology Labs
- New Jersey Motion Picture and Television Commission
- America's first motion picture industry
- Television and film in New Jersey
- Newark Black Film Festival
