= Caven Point Studio =

Film studio and soundstage complex in New Jersey, United States

Coordinates: 40.7040232871895°N 74.07266824284716°W

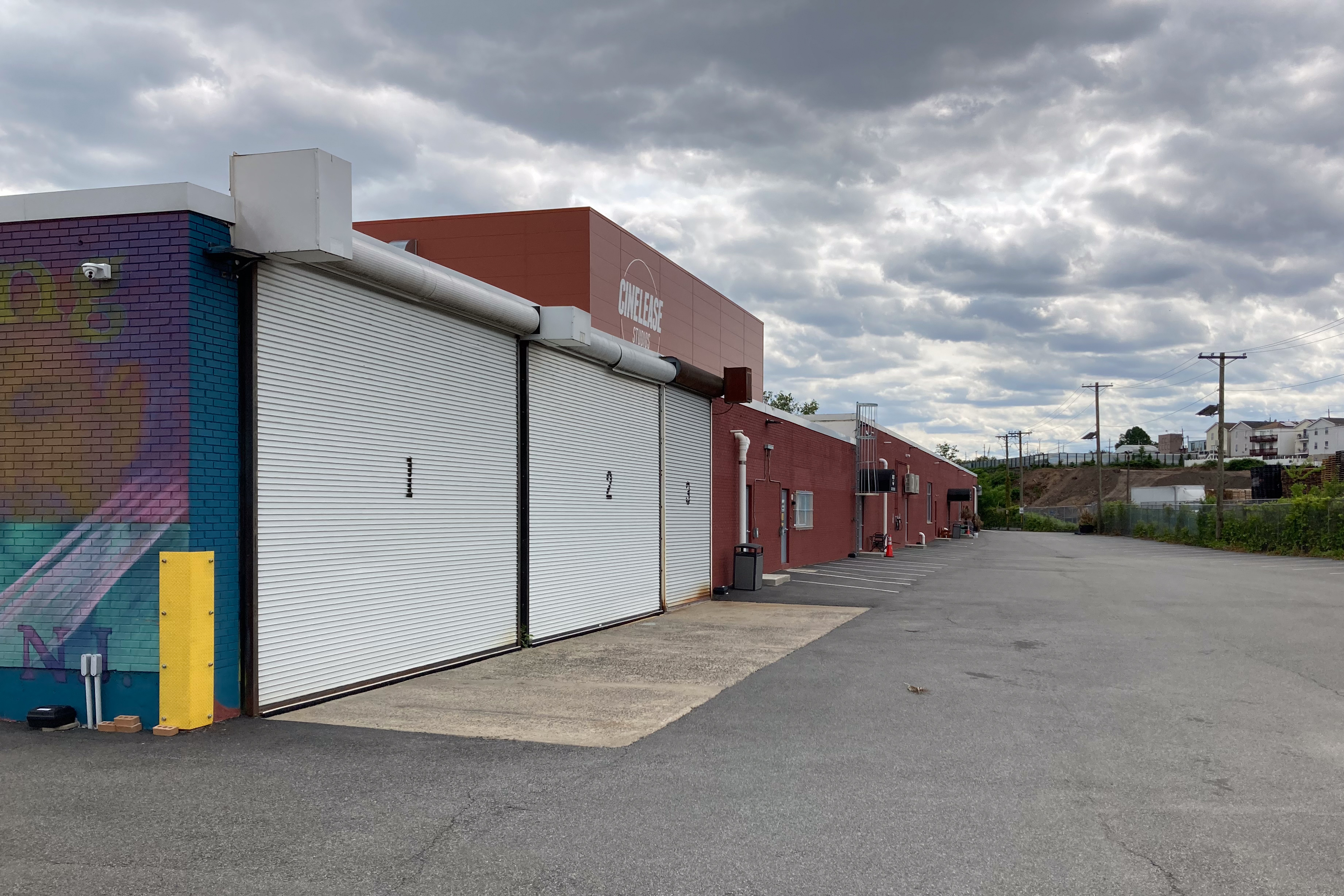
Cinelease Caven Point Studio

Cinelease Studios–Caven Point, or Caven Point Studio, is a film studio/soundstage complex in Jersey City, New Jersey and is one of largest film studios in New Jersey.

== Background ==
The building, located in the Greenville section of the city, had earlier been a 'last mile' warehouse-distribution center. It is east of Garfield Avenue and west of the Hudson County Extension of the New Jersey Turnpike at the southern end of the Canal Crossing redevelopment area.

In September 2019, the Criterion Group announced it would convert the warehouse complex into the what would be state's largest film studio named Caven Point Studio. In 2020, Criterion Group partnered with One Stop Properties to purchase two nearby warehouse properties to create three soundstages and an offsite “support space” called "Fold and Hold". The project received tax credits and other incentives offered by the state through the New Jersey Economic Development Authority and the New Jersey Motion Picture and Television Commission.

The complex opened in August 2021. It has three soundstages totaling 112,400 square feet (10,440 m^{2}) that are 40 feet (12 m) high to the grid and 50 feet (15 m) to the ceiling. In August 2023, it was announced that the complex would further expand, with three additional soundstages, adding 76,649 square feet of studio space. In December 2025, a 135,000-square-foot renovation of the former warehouse at 21 Caven Point Avenue was reportedly under construction as a film studio.

== See also ==
- Netflix Studios Fort Monmouth
- Lionsgate Newark Studios
- 1888 Studios
- America's first motion picture industry
- Television and film in New Jersey
