= 1888 Studios =

Proposed film and television studio

Coordinates: 40°38′51″N 74°08′29″W

1888 Studios is a proposed film and television studio planned to be built on a 70-acre (28 ha) site at Bergen Point in Bayonne, New Jersey. Its name is a nod to the year the movie camera was invented. At 1.5M million gross square feet, reports say it will be the largest ground-up movie studio complex in North America.

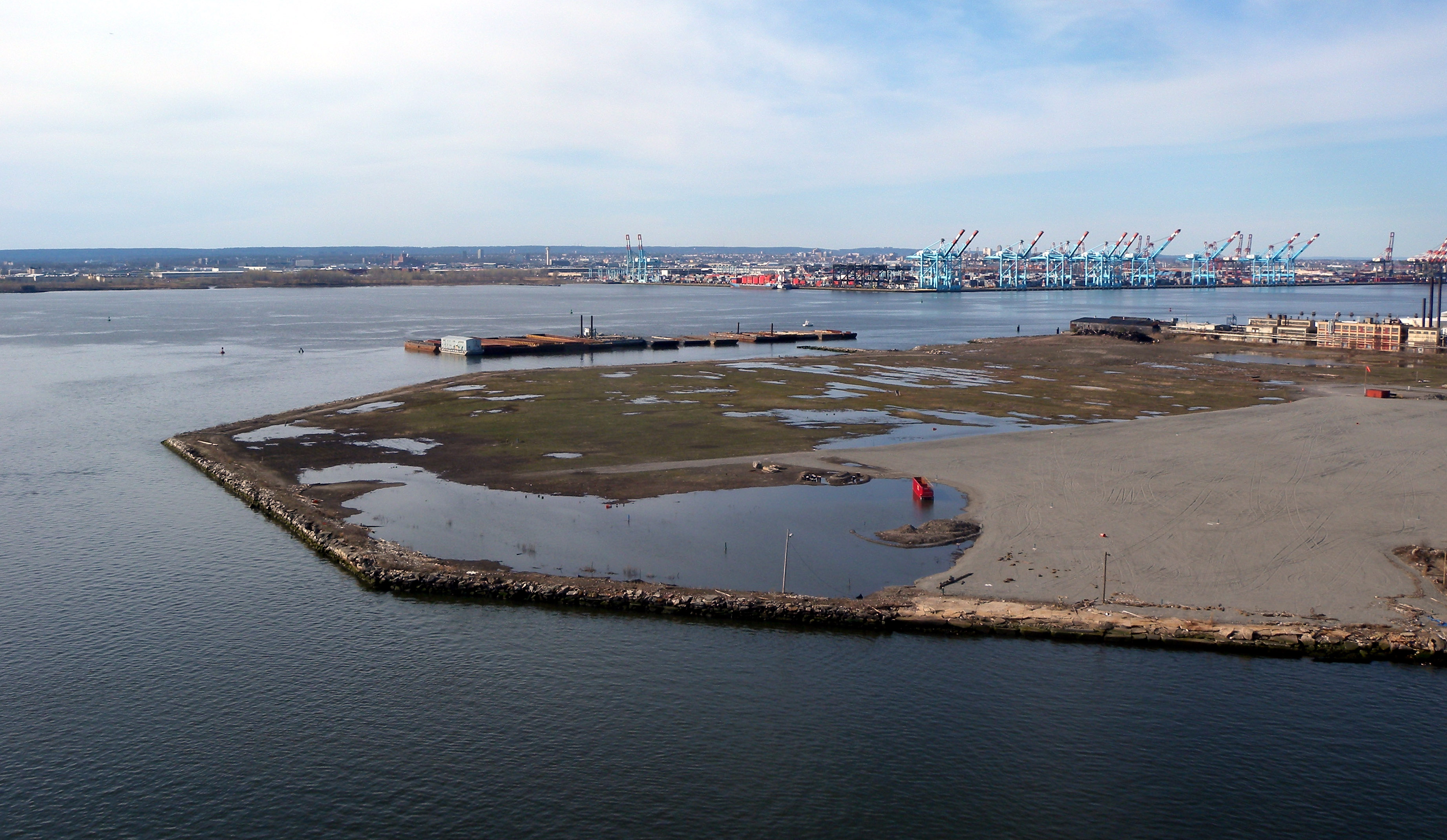
Bergen Point, site of proposed studio

The waterfront brownfield site on the Kill van Kull and Newark Bay was a former Texaco site rezoned in 2020 in a redevelopment plan to permit a film studio to be built. When completed, it will be New Jersey's largest film and television studio and will include a part of the Hackensack RiverWalk.

The project, which will include approximately 19 buildings, is estimated to cost $700 million in construction and $200 million in land development. The City of Bayonne floated a bond of $65 million to support the project. as well a PILOT agreement. Projected to cost over $1 billion, it is being spearheaded by Arpad Busson with incentives from the New Jersey Economic Development Authority.

The studio lot was designed by architectural firm Gensler. Construction was expected to start in 2024 and take 2 years.

In October 2025, Paramount Skydance announced that it had signed a minimum 10-year, 285,000-square-foot (26,500 m^{2}) lease at 1888 Studios. The groundbreaking took place on December 16, 2025.

== See also ==
- Netflix Studios Fort Monmouth
- Caven Point Studio
- Lionsgate Newark Studios
- America's first motion picture industry
- Television and film in New Jersey
- New Jersey Motion Picture and Television Commission
