= Newark Black Film Festival =

Annual Black film festival in New Jersey

- Date(s): Mid-July
- Frequency: Annual
- Venue: The Newark Museum of Art
- Location(s): Newark, New Jersey
- Founded: 1974
- Website: newarkblackfilmfestival.com

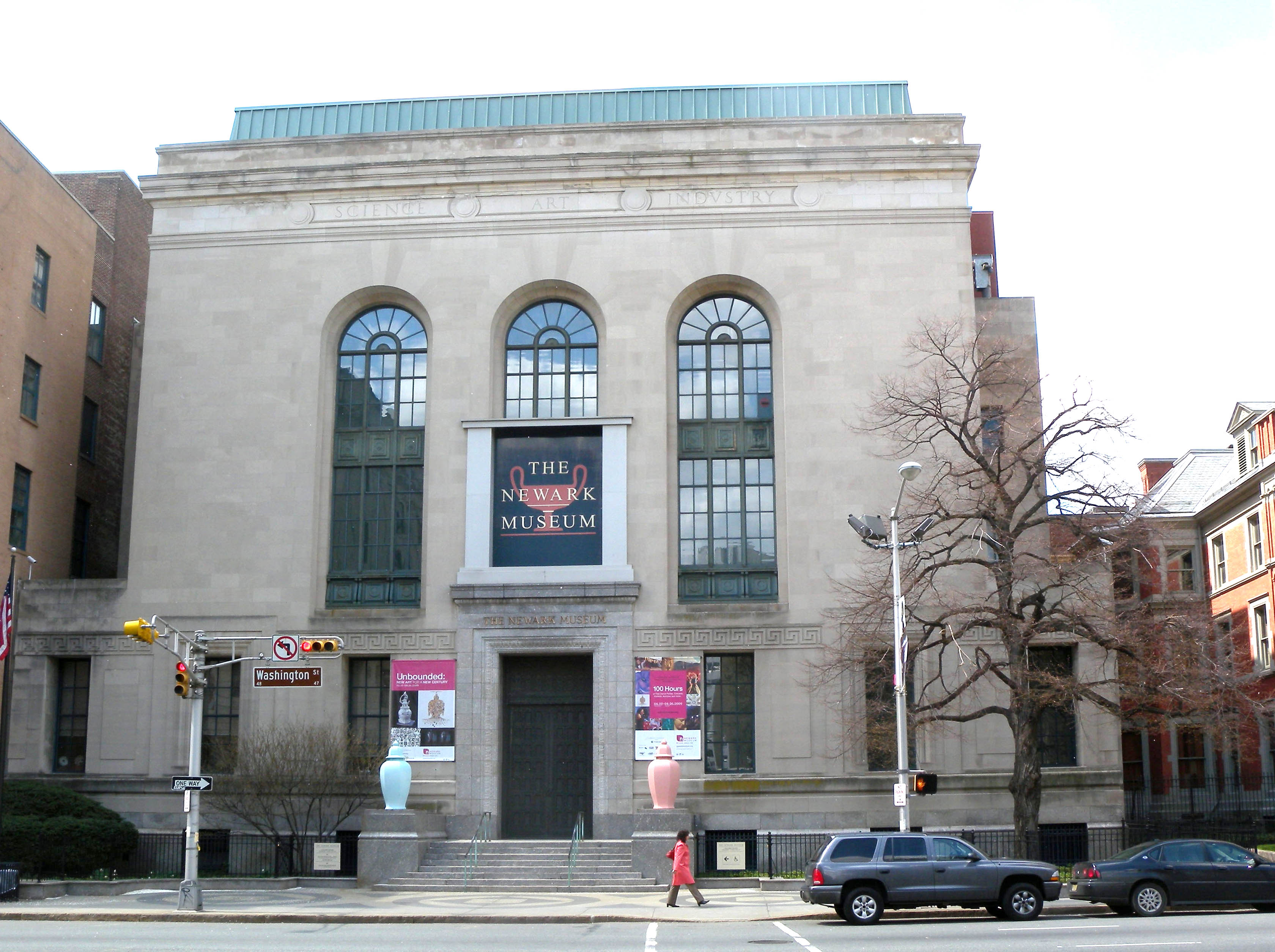
Every summer, the Newark Black Film Festival is held at The Newark Museum of Art

The New Jersey-born singer, actor and activist Paul Robeson in 1942. The Paul Robeson Awards are held biannually at the Newark Black Film Festival.

The Newark Black Film Festival (NBFF), is an annual film festival that has taken place since 1974 in Newark, New Jersey, and is the longest running Black film festival in the United States. It operates under the auspices of The Newark Museum of Art. The NBFF focuses on the work and history of African Americans and the African Diaspora. Screenings are typically followed by a Q&A session with the filmmakers and scholars.

The Newark Black Film Festival Paul Robeson Awards began as a biennial competition in 1985. The festival receives funding in the form of grants from various foundations and corporations and is free of charge to the public.

== History ==
The concept of the festival was originated by filmmaker Oliver Franklin in 1974 at the University of Pennsylvania Annenberg Center. Gus Heningburg, of the Greater Newark Urban Coalition, suggested that the Newark Museum host one of its traveling events, after which it became part of the museum's programming. As quoted in the Newark-based newspaper, The Star-Ledger, Rutgers University professor Clement Price (originally on the selection committee) said "The festival was started in the lean years of Newark history, following the disturbances of the summer of '67, The Newark Black Film Festival was one of the early and more credible efforts to address the trauma and civic dislocation and the concerns about the future of Newark. The enduring aspiration of the festival has been to show films that give a believable portrait of African-American and African diasporic life."

During its history, films have been shown at other venues in the city including the Newark Public Library, Newark Symphony Hall, Washington Park, Rutgers University–Newark, New Jersey Institute of Technology, and Cityplex12.

== See also ==
- List of film festivals in New Jersey
- Television and film in New Jersey
- New Jersey Motion Picture and Television Commission
- James Moody Jazz Festival
