= Passaic: Birthplace of Television and the DuMont Story =

- Genre: Television play
- Starring: Allen B. DuMont
- Country of origin: United States
- Original language: English

Production
- Running time: 15 minutes

Original release
- Network: DuMont
- Release: November 14, 1951

Passaic: Birthplace of Television and the DuMont Story is a television play which aired on the DuMont Television Network on November 14, 1951.

The short tele-play was broadcast live and was a drama about the rise of DuMont Laboratories and its founder Allen B. DuMont, who appears as himself at the end of the 15-minute broadcast. DuMont founded DuMont Laboratories in 1931, and the DuMont Television Network in 1946. Besides his work in television, DuMont is best known for his work in improving the cathode ray tube, and for his contributions to the development of radar.

== Preservation status ==
At least two archives have copies of the telecast, including the UCLA Film and Television Archive.

== See also ==
- List of programs broadcast by the DuMont Television Network
- List of surviving DuMont Television Network broadcasts
- Television and film in New Jersey

== Bibliography ==
- David Weinstein, The Forgotten Network: DuMont and the Birth of American Television (Philadelphia: Temple University Press, 2004) ISBN 1-59213-245-6
- Alex McNeil, Total Television, Fourth edition (New York: Penguin Books, 1980) ISBN 0-14-024916-8
- Tim Brooks and Earle Marsh, The Complete Directory to Prime Time Network TV Shows, Third edition (New York: Ballantine Books, 1964) ISBN 0-345-31864-1
