= Allen B. DuMont Laboratories =

American television equipment manufacturer & broadcasting company (1931–1960)

Allen B. DuMont Laboratories, Inc.
- Type: Private
- Industry: Television equipment manufacturer Broadcasting company
- Founded: 1931; 95 years ago Upper Montclair, New Jersey, United States
- Founder: Allen B. DuMont
- Defunct: 1960; 66 years ago
- Fate: Broadcast operations spun off into DuMont Broadcasting Corporation (1956); renamed to Metropolitan Broadcasting Corporation (1958), then Metromedia (1961), Metromedia television stations bought by News Corporation & used to form the nucleus of Fox Television Stations; TV set manufacturing operations sold to Emerson Radio (1958); Oscillograph & CRT manufacturing operations merged into Fairchild Camera and Instrument (1960); renamed Fairchild Weston Systems (1982), acquired by Loral Corporation & renamed Loral Fairchild Systems (1989), acquired by Lockheed Martin through purchase of Loral Corporation's defense electronics and system integration businesses, becoming Lockheed Fairchild Systems (1996), was grouped with Sanders Associates and Lockheed Martin Space Electronics & Communications under the Lockheed Martin Aerospace Electronic Systems division, division then acquired by BAE Systems (2000)
- Successor: Fox Television Stations (Broadcasting operations); Emerson Radio (TV manufacturing operations); BAE Systems (Oscillograph & cathode-ray tube manufacturing operations)
- Headquarters: Clifton, New Jersey, United States
- Products: DuMont Television Network; WABD (WNYW, FOX O&O); KCTY (defunct DuMont affiliate); W2XVT (experimental, defunct DuMont affiliate); KE2XDR (experimental, defunct DuMont affiliate); WDTV (KDKA-TV, CBS O&O); WTTG (FOX O&O); Cathode-ray tubes Magic eye tube
- Owner: Allen B. DuMuont (1931–1939); Allen B. DuMont (60%) (1939–1955); According to the FCC in 1953: Allen B. DuMont (1931–1953); Allen B. DuMont (minority) (1953–1956)
- Parent: Paramount Pictures Inc. (40%) (1939–1955); Paramount Pictures Inc. (1955–1956); According to the Federal Communications Commission in 1953: Paramount Pictures Inc. (majority) (1953–1956) (The FCC, in 1953, had ascertained that Paramount controlled DuMont Labs, even though Paramount only owned 40% of the company)

Allen B. DuMont Laboratories, Inc. (printed on products as Allen B. Du Mont Laboratories, Inc., referred to as DuMont Laboratories or DuMont Labs, and DuMont on company documents) was an American television equipment manufacturer and broadcasting company. At one point it owned TV stations WABD (WNYW, FOX O&O), KCTY (defunct DuMont affiliate), W2XVT (experimental, defunct DuMont affiliate), KE2XDR (experimental, defunct DuMont affiliate), & WDTV (KDKA-TV, CBS O&O), as well as WTTG (FOX O&O), all former affiliates of its DuMont Television Network.

The company was founded in 1931 in Upper Montclair, NJ, by inventor Allen B. DuMont, with its headquarters in nearby Clifton NJ. Among the company's developments were durable cathode-ray tubes (CRTs) that would be used for TV and its magic eye tube.

== History ==
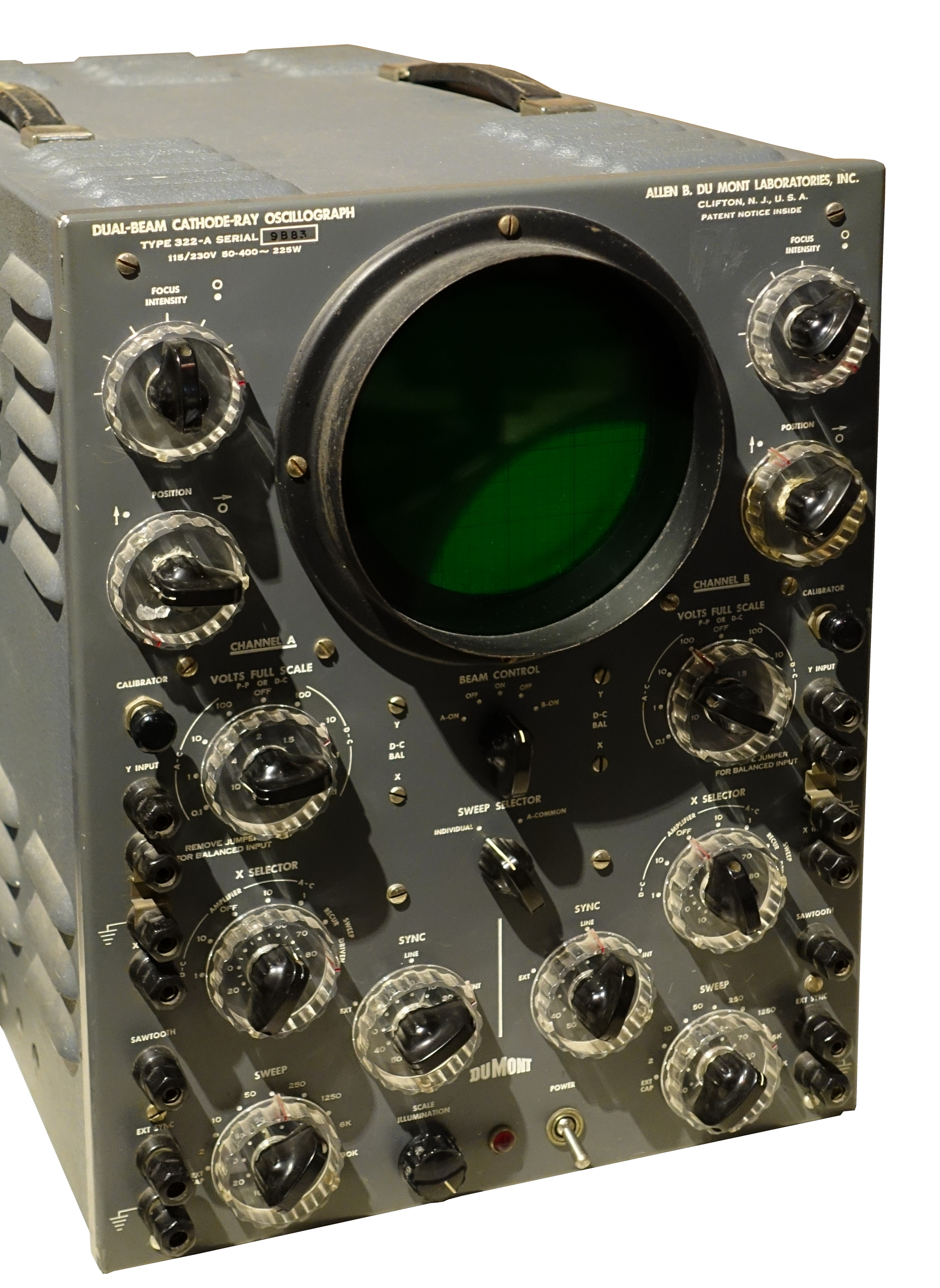
Dual-beam cathode ray oscilloscope type 322-A, Du Mont Laboratories, early 1950s

In 1938, DuMont Labs began manufacturing televisions at a factory in nearby Passaic, New Jersey. To sell TVs, it began the DuMont Television Network in 1942, one of the earliest TV networks. Later, they manufactured cameras and transmitters for TV. DuMont equipment was known for its high quality. The main CRT factory was in Clifton, New Jersey. It made black and white TV tubes as well as instrumentation and military fire control tubes in the early 1950s.

In 1956, under the ownership of Paramount, DuMont Labs shuttered the network and spun off WABD & WTTG to "DuMont Broadcasting Corporation". Eventually, the company was renamed "Metropolitan Broadcasting Company" in order to distance itself from the DuMont branding, which was seen as a failure. In 1958, John Kluge bought Paramount's stake in Metropolitan Broadcasting, renaming it to Metromedia. DuMont's partner, Thomas T. Goldsmith, remained on Metromedia's board of directors until the stations were sold to the Fox Television Stations Group. Nearly every original DuMont television program is considered lost, and presumed destroyed. Only roughly 100 recordings of any DuMont series have been recovered.

DuMont Labs eventually sold its TV manufacturing division to Emerson Radio in 1958. The remainder of the company merged into Fairchild Camera in 1960. Fairchild later developed semiconductor microchips. Robert Noyce, founder of Intel, originally worked for DuMont Labs as an engineer.

DuMont Labs TVs outside the US were assembled under license in Montreal, Quebec, Canada by Canadian Aviation Electronics, currently a manufacturer of flight simulator and pilot training equipment.

=== Name ownership ===
On April 18, 2012, a US federal trademark registration was filed for "Allen B. DuMont Laboratories, Inc." by Alan Levin of Cabin John, Maryland. The description provided to the United States Patent and Trademark Office for it is "Antennas for radio, for television; Electrical and optical cables; Electronic and optical communications instruments and components".

However, by June 5, 2020, the trademark registration for "Allen B. DuMont Laboratories, Inc." by Mr. Levin had lapsed, with the status having changed to "CONTINUED USE NOT FILED WITHIN GRACE PERIOD, UN-REVIVABLE", resulting in the trademark no longer being active, with a search on the United States Patent and Trademark Office website for the "Allen B. DuMont Laboratories, Inc." trademark confirming the trademark's status as "DEAD".

== See also ==
- Metromedia
- Passaic: Birthplace of Television and the DuMont Story
