= Allen B. DuMont =

American electronics engineer and inventor (1901–1965)

- DuMont with first 21-inch color TV picture tube (1954)
- Born: Allen Balcom DuMont; January 29, 1901; New York City, U.S.
- Died: November 14, 1965 (aged 64); Montclair, New Jersey, U.S.
- Education: Rensselaer Polytechnic Institute
- Known for: Cathode-ray tube radar founded DuMont Television Network
- Awards: First recipient of the Westinghouse Award (later the Intel Science Talent Search, then the Regeneron Science Talent Search)
- Scientific career
- Fields: Electronics engineer
- Workplaces: Westinghouse Lamp Company de Forest Radio Telephone & Telegraph Company; Allen B. DuMont Laboratories

Allen Balcom DuMont (/ˈduːmɒnt/; January 29, 1901 – November 14, 1965) was an American electronics engineer, scientist, and inventor who improved the cathode-ray tube in 1931 for use in television receivers. Seven years later he manufactured and sold the first commercially practical television set to the public. In June 1938, his Model 180 television receiver was the first all-electronic television set sold to the public, a few months prior to RCA's first TV set in April 1939. In 1946, DuMont founded the first television network to be licensed, the DuMont Television Network, by linking station WABD (named for DuMont, later becoming WNEW and then WNYW) in New York City to station W3XWT, which later became WTTG, in Washington, D.C. WTTG was named for Thomas T. Goldsmith, DuMont's Vice President of Research, and his best friend. DuMont's successes in television picture tubes, TV sets and components and his involvement in commercial TV broadcasting made him the first millionaire in the business.

== Biography ==
=== Early life ===
DuMont was born in Brooklyn, New York City, the son of Lillian Felton (Balcom) and William Henry Beaman DuMont. At the age of 10, he was stricken with polio and was quarantined at his family's Eastern Parkway apartment for nearly a year. During his quarantine, his father brought home books and magazines for the young DuMont to read while bedridden. DuMont developed an interest in science, wireless radio communication, and taught himself Morse code.

His father bought him a crystal radio receiver which he assembled, took apart, reassembled and rebuilt several times. He improved his set each time he rebuilt it and later built a transmitter, while his father obtained the landlord's permission to erect a 30-foot-high (9.1 m) transceiving antenna on the roof.

While recuperating from polio, DuMont was advised to swim to regain the use of his legs. In 1914, the family moved to Montclair, New Jersey, where there was an indoor year-round pool available at the local YMCA. He graduated from Montclair High School in 1919, and went to Rensselaer Polytechnic Institute in Troy, New York, where he was part of the Alpha chapter of the Theta Xi fraternity.

=== Radio and early interest in television ===
In 1915, DuMont became the youngest American to obtain a first class commercial radio operator's license at age 14. The following summer, he worked as a radio operator aboard a coastal steamer making runs from New York to Providence, Rhode Island. As the summers went by, he made his way to the Caribbean, South America and, after World War I, to Europe, where, during the summer of 1922, he was stuck in Copenhagen for months because of a dock workers' strike.

After graduating from Rensselaer in 1924, DuMont worked at the Westinghouse Lamp Company in Bloomfield, New Jersey, in charge of radio tube production. There he increased production from 500 tubes per day to an astounding 50,000 tubes per day. Management gave him a $500 bonus, a small raise, and devised the "Westinghouse Award" to recognize his accomplishments. The Westinghouse Award was later presented as a scholarship award to high school seniors showing promise in a field of science (later the Intel Science Talent Search) and continues to this day as the Regeneron Science Talent Search.

By 1928, DuMont was searching for new opportunities and was wooed by Lee de Forest, a radio pioneer who developed the audion tube, the original voice amplifier for radio reception. De Forest had had a checkered career as an inventor and several failed business ventures. DuMont was hired by the de Forest Radio Telephone & Telegraph Company as vice president and production manager for radio tubes. He revamped the factory with newly designed machinery: "a high speed sealing machine, automatic grid winding and welding machine, base branding machine, basing and wire cutting machine, high-frequency bombarder and numerous tube-characteristic test sets and life racks." Factory capacity was increased to 30,000 tubes per day.

When De Forest took over the mechanical television system of C. Francis Jenkins, DuMont turned his attention to television. He was involved in the first television transmissions from W2XCD in Passaic. But DuMont realized that clear images would need the development of scanning in a cathode-ray tube. DuMont worked to improve television transmission and reception and implored De Forest for funds to build a long-lasting cathode-ray tube for television reception. De Forest denied DuMont's request because De Forest's investors were demanding better returns. DuMont subsequently resigned at the same time that De Forest sold his radio manufacturing business to David Sarnoff at RCA.

=== Cathode-ray tube and oscillograph ===
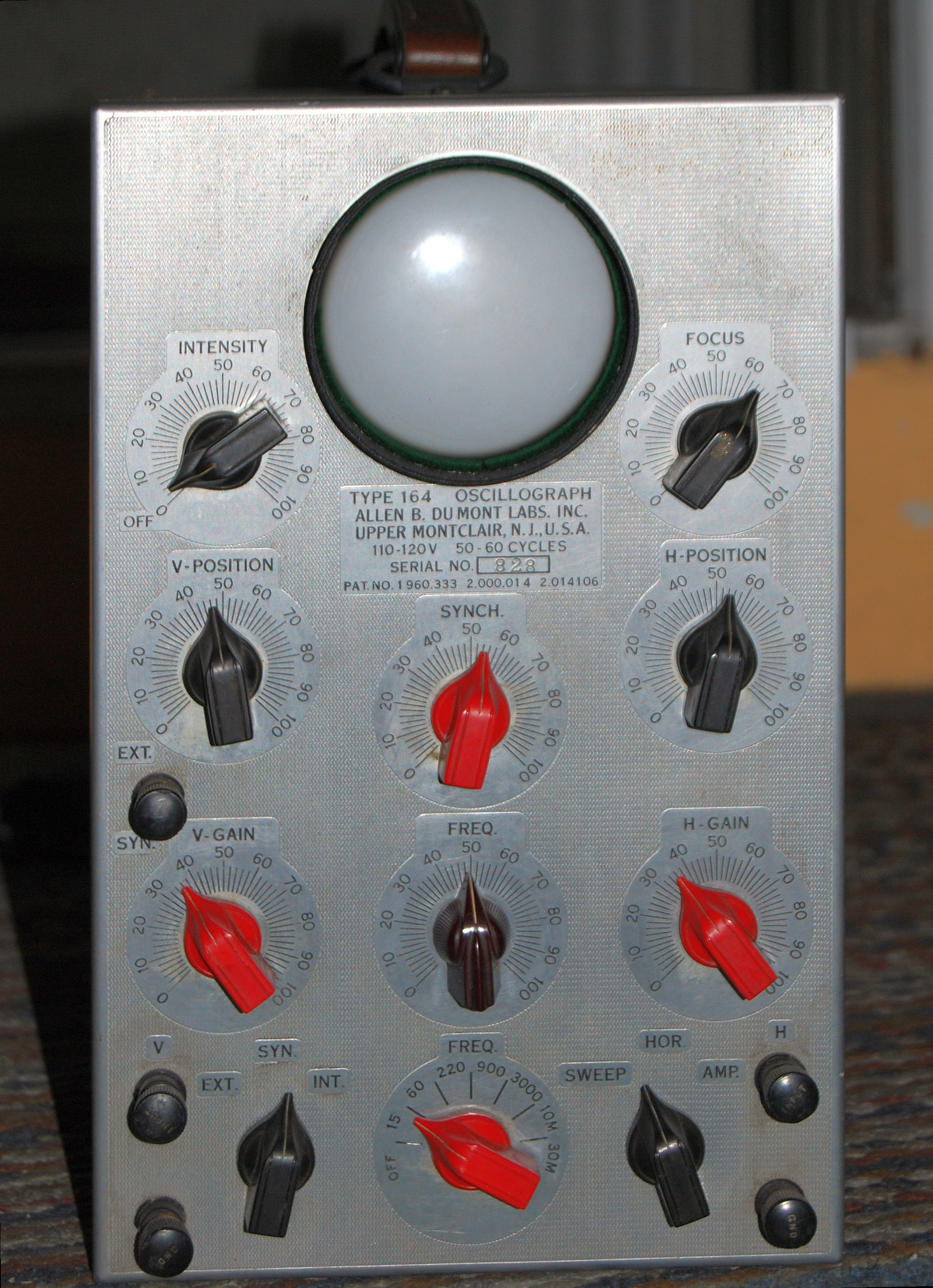
DuMont 164 Oscillograph (1939-40), an early general purpose oscilloscope

DuMont had developed an improved version of the cathode-ray tube which was both cheaper to produce and longer-lasting than the typical German tubes in use– the imported tubes had a life of 25 to 30 hours. DuMont's invention of the first long-lasting cathode-ray tube made television commercially viable. He started his own company, Allen B. DuMont Laboratories, in the basement of his Upper Montclair, NJ home, building long-lasting cathode-ray tubes. In 1931, he sold two tubes to two college science laboratories for $35 each.

Since DuMont was a leader in cathode-ray tube (CRT) design and manufacturing, it was a natural step to use the CRT as a visual measuring instrument or oscilloscope. The production of CRT's and oscilloscopes was part of DuMont Laboratories in Upper Montclair. Needing more space he moved to a larger location in Passaic, NJ in 1934. Although not the inventor of the oscilloscope, DuMont designed and mass-produced practical oscilloscopes (which he called oscillographs) for all types of laboratory, automotive/equipment servicing and manufacturing applications. By the 1940s DuMont was the leader in the oscilloscope equipment market. DuMont was one of the earliest designers of the triggered sweep oscilloscope using a gas thyratron vacuum tube (forerunner to the silicon controlled rectifier or SCR). This allowed the oscilloscope to display a visual trace at a preset input signal level. In addition the sweep (trace across the CRT screen) could be regulated by the sweep speed or sweep frequency. This design allowed the oscilloscope to provide better visual detail of the signal being studied. The trigger was a frequency synchronizing type which provided viewing stability.

The profits from the oscillographs helped DuMont invest in television design and his DuMont TV Network. Unfortunately the time spent on his TV ventures cannibalized his profitable oscillograph business. In 1947, a young equipment manufacturer called Tektronix produced the model 511 Time Base Trigger and Sweep Oscilloscope for $795. The use of time instead of frequency to measure a sweep across the CRT was Tektronix's big selling point. Time measurements make it easier to interpret pulses and complex waveforms. It has been mentioned informally that Allen DuMont saw the model 511 demonstrated at an electronics show. He tried it and was impressed, but commented to Howard Vollum and Jack Murdock, co-founders of Tektronix, that it was too expensive and that they would be lucky to sell any. Tektronix's time base trigger and time sweep generator design would become the standard in the 1950s and into the 21st century. Tektronix would replace DuMont Oscillographs as the leading selling oscilloscope brand.

When Fairchild Camera and Instrument acquired DuMont Laboratories in 1960, oscilloscopes were still being made with the DuMont name brand. Allen DuMont became Group General Manager of the DuMont Division, and remained in this position until his death in 1965. All DuMont oscilloscopes in the late 1950s and after the Fairchild acquisition were using the time base trigger and time sweep generator method introduced by Tektronix. The DuMont line of oscilloscopes continued to be produced into the 1980s.

During the early years of World War II, DuMont received special government contracts to provide large 36 inches (91 cm) wide cathode-ray tubes. These tubes allowed scientists working on the Manhattan Project to study the action of accelerated electrons.

=== Other achievements ===
In 1932, DuMont proposed a "ship finder" device to the United States Army Signal Corps at Fort Monmouth, New Jersey, that used radio wave distortions to locate objects on a cathode-ray tube screen, a type of radar. The military asked him, however, not to take out a patent because they wanted to maintain secrecy, so he is seldom mentioned among those responsible for radar.

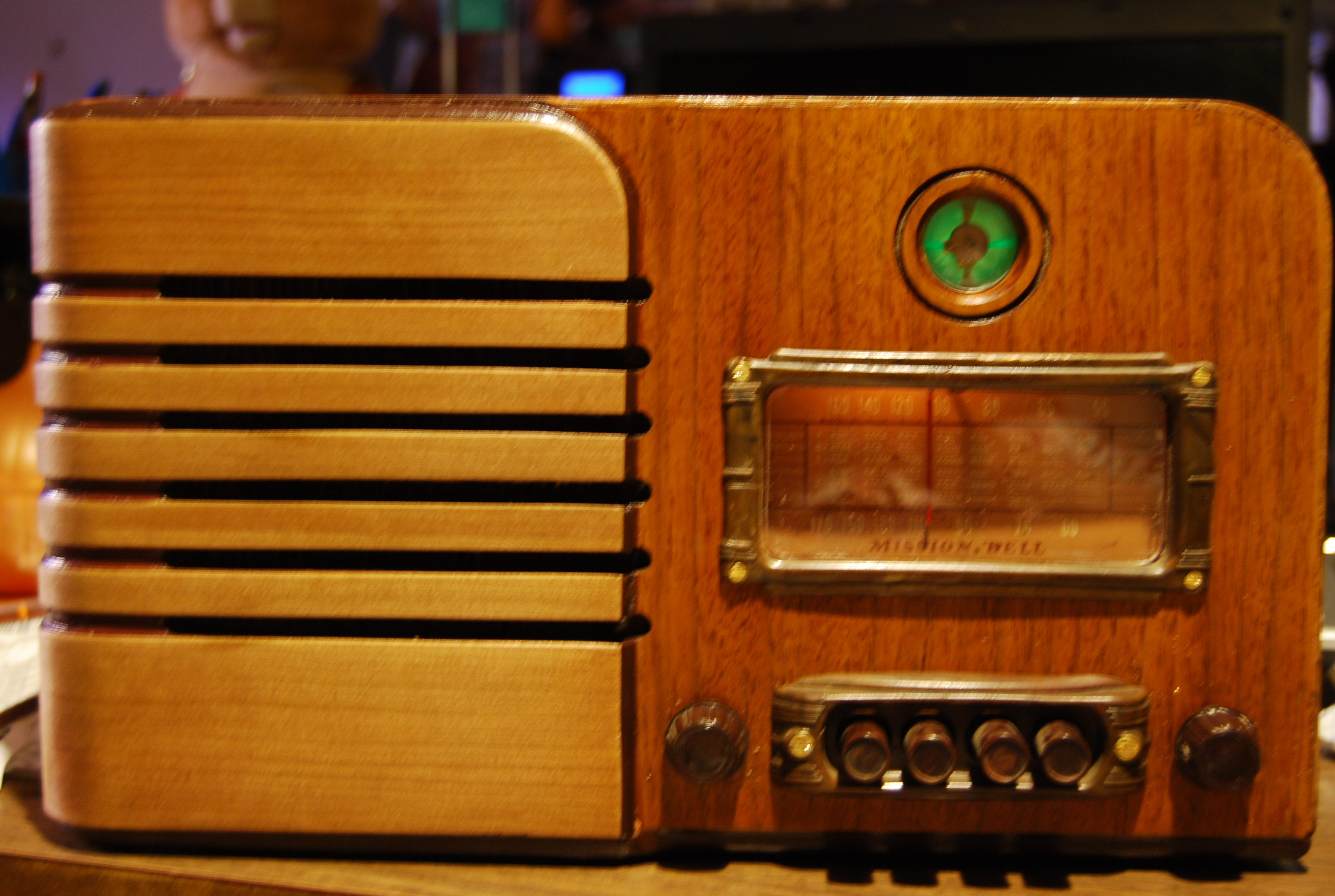
Magic Eye tube used for tuning in a 1939 Mission Bell Model 410 radio. (green glow)

In 1932, DuMont invented the magic eye tube, or Electron Ray Tube, used as a tuning accessory in radios and as a level meter in mono and stereo home reel-to-reel tape recorders. In the 1930s the manufacture of mechanical panel meters was labor-intensive and expensive. Magic eye tubes provided radio designers with a less expensive and more profitable way to add a feature usually found in higher priced equipment. The general public reception was a success, as customers liked the green glow and the seemingly magical way it worked. He released details on his invention the following year. He sold the patent rights to RCA for $20,000 to help fund his other projects.

DuMont produced black and white televisions in the late 1930s, 1940s and 1950s that were generally regarded as offering highest quality and durability. Many of these premium sets included a built in AM/FM radio and record player.

DuMont sold his television manufacturing division to Emerson Radio in 1958, and sold the remainder of the company to Fairchild Camera in 1960. Fairchild later developed semiconductor microchips. Robert Noyce, a co-founder of Intel, originally worked for DuMont as an engineer.

== DuMont Television Network ==
The DuMont Television Network was not an unqualified success, being faced with the major problem of how to make a profit without the benefit of an already established radio network as a base. After ten years, DuMont shuttered the network and sold what remained of his television operations to John Kluge in 1956, which Kluge renamed Metromedia. DuMont's partner, Thomas T. Goldsmith (for whom the Washington, D.C. station WTTG was named), remained on Metromedia's board of directors from this time all the way until Kluge sold the stations to the Fox Television Stations Group in 1986, when the Fox network was formed.

== Awards, family and later life ==
DuMont was the first to provide funding for educational television broadcasting. He was the recipient of numerous honorary degrees and awards, among them the Cross of Knight awarded by the French Government, the Horatio Alger Award, the Westinghouse Award, and the DeForest Medal. He is also a holder of over 30 patents in cathode-ray tubes and other television equipment.

DuMont enjoyed sailing. He owned a cruiser, the Hurricane III. He would participate in boat races and compete in navigation skills competition, winning three national championships. He died in 1965 and is buried in Mount Hebron Cemetery in Montclair, New Jersey. He was survived by his wife Ethel and their two children, Allen Jr. and Yvonne. The television center at Montclair State University bears his name and produces programs for the NJTV system (formerly New Jersey Network, now NJ PBS).
