= Bergen Point =

Area in Hudson County, New Jersey

- Unincorporated community
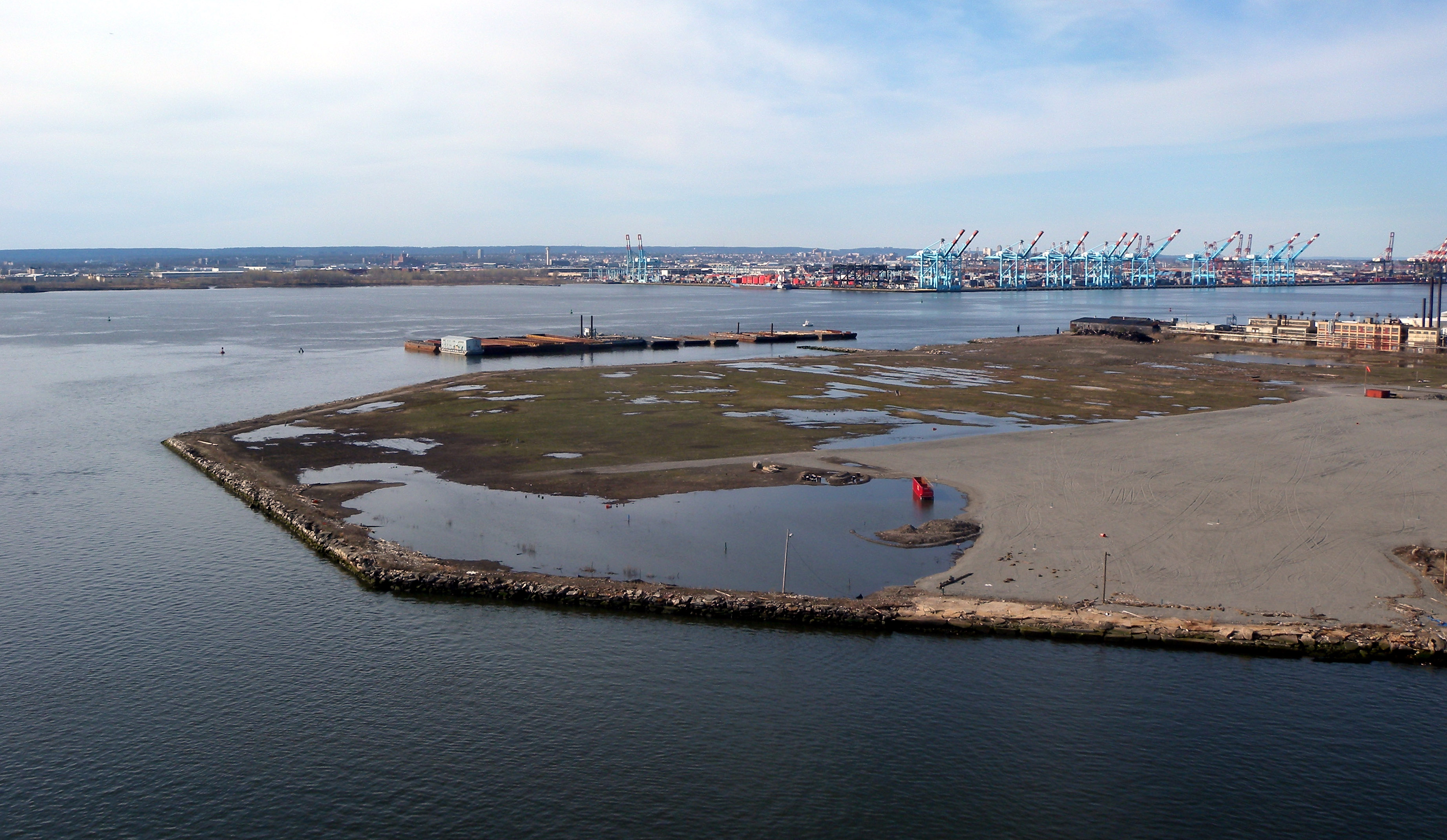
- Southwestern tip of Bergen Point

- Bergen Point in Hudson County in New Jersey
- Coordinates: 40°38′51″N 74°08′29″W
- Country: United States
- State: New Jersey
- County: Hudson
- City: Bayonne
- Elevation: 7 ft (2.1 m)
- Area code: 201
- GNIS feature ID: 874681

Bergen Point is a point of land that lends its name to the adjacent neighborhood in Bayonne in Hudson County, in the U.S. state of New Jersey. The point is located on the north side of Kill van Kull at Newark Bay. It is the section of the city closest to the Bayonne Bridge. Historically the term has been used more broadly as synonymous with Constable Hook, from which it is geographically separated at Port Johnson.

== History ==
The area was connected to Staten Island with a ferry as early as the late 17th century, and was later developed as a resort. In the late 18th century it became more prominent as a ferry landing for travelers between New York City and Philadelphia. An 1837 US government coastal survey map identifies it as Vanhorn Point, reflecting the name of a Dutch family that occupied the area just to the north called Pamrapo (among many other spellings, roughly today's Curries Woods neighborhood in Greenville) from the mid-17th century. The Bergen Point Lighthouse, built offshore in 1849, was demolished and replaced with a skeletal tower in the mid 20th century. A charter was granted for the construction of The Jersey City and Bergen Point Plank Road in 1851.

Governor of New Jersey Jon Corzine announced on May 6, 2006, that funding was in place to extend the Hudson-Bergen Light Rail system to Eighth Street. Work was completed and the station opened in January 2011.

A large portion of the point was once site of a Texaco plant, which was cleared and is slated to become a residential and recreational area along Newark Bay and Kill Van Kull. Other former industrial sites are slated for mixed-use development. In 2022, the construction of a major studio at was announced. Called 1888 Studios, it will be the largest in New Jersey.

The renovated Collins Park and walkways along the new developments are part of the Hackensack RiverWalk.

1888 Studios is a planned movie studio being built on the southern tip of Bergen Point.

== Gallery ==
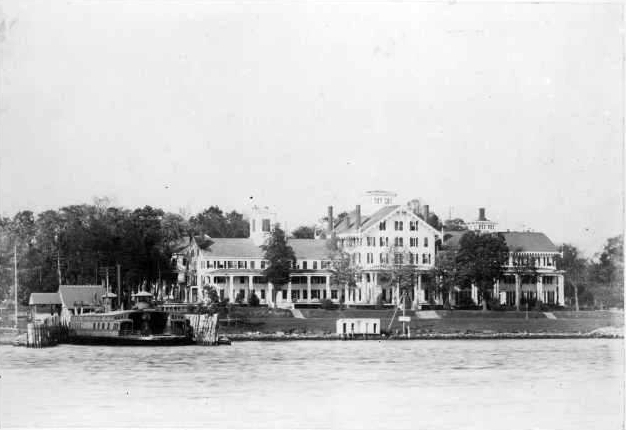
The Latourette House in Bergen Point was the birthplace of Samuel Francis Du Pont

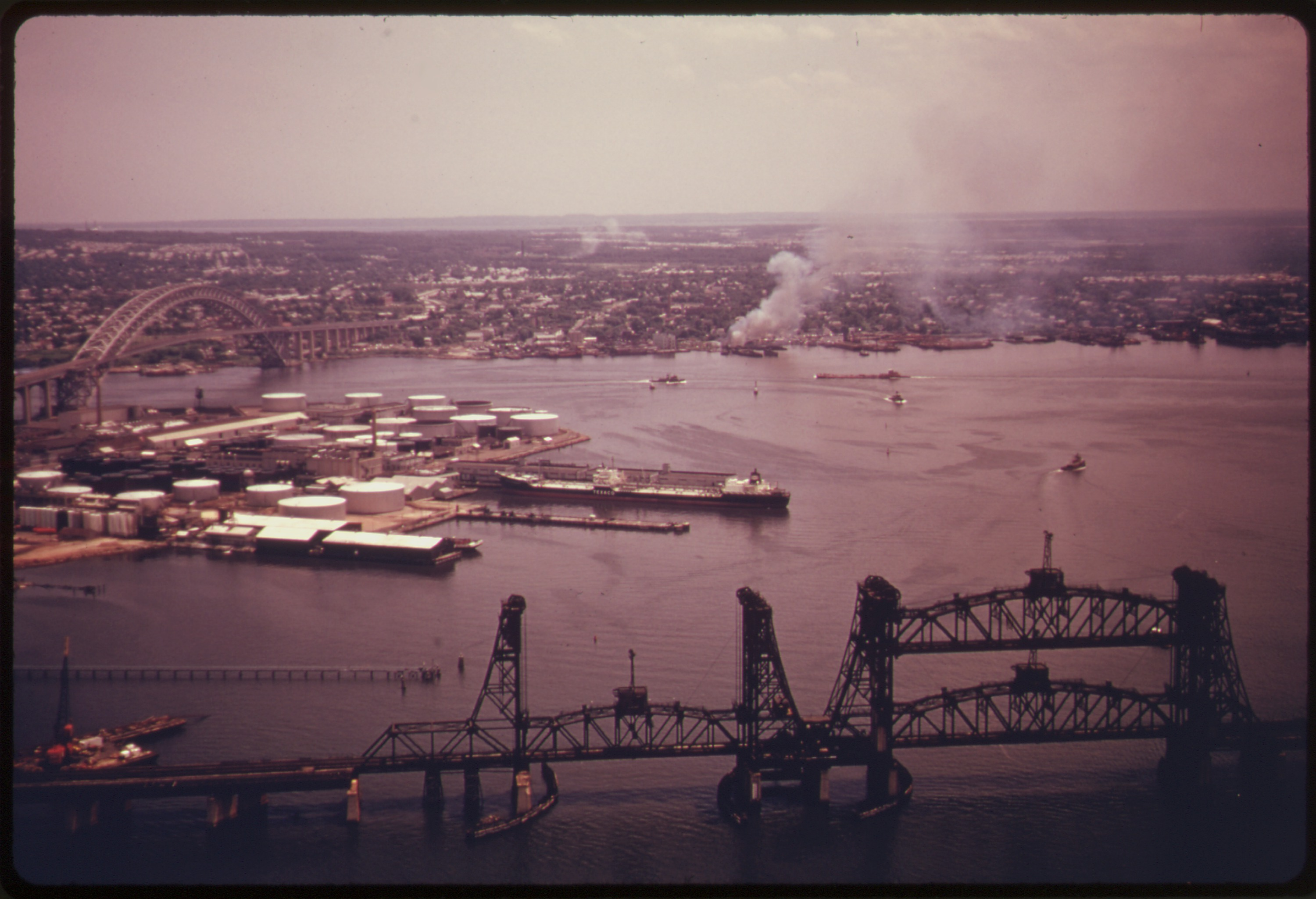
Bergen Point, 1974

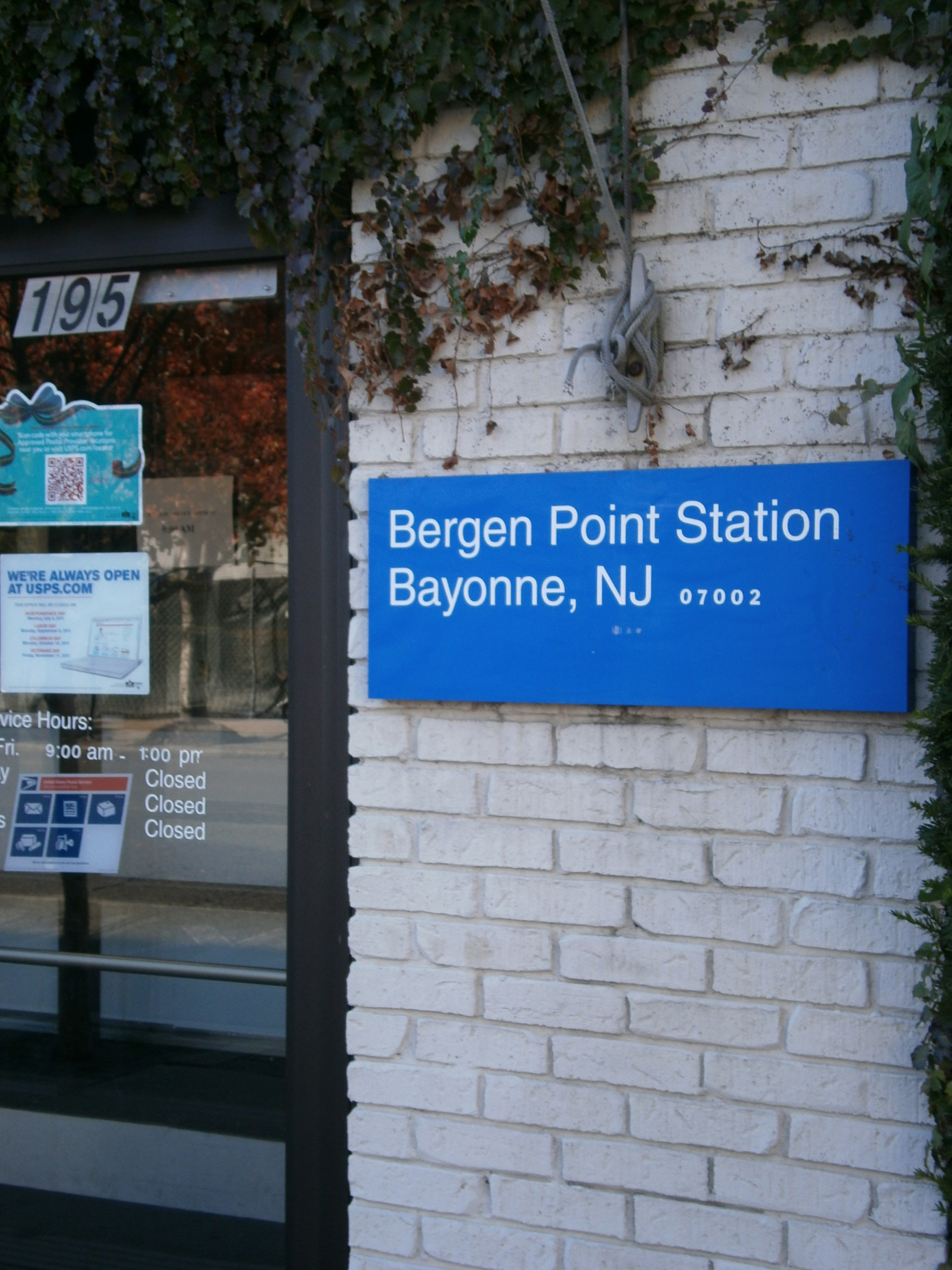
The point lends its name to the neighborhood

== See also ==
- Bergen Neck
- Hackensack RiverWalk
- Geography of New York–New Jersey Harbor Estuary
- Port of New York and New Jersey
