= Magic eye tube =

Visual indicator of the amplitude of an electronic signal

EM34 tuning eye

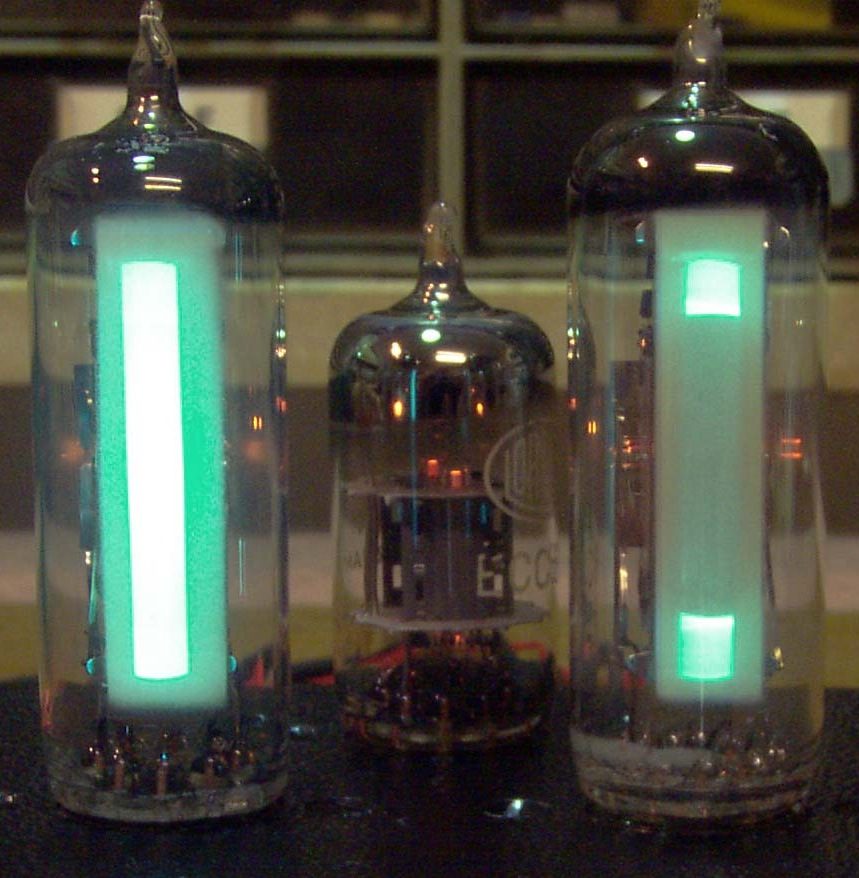
EM84 tuning indicator

A magic eye tube or tuning indicator, in technical literature called an electron-ray indicator tube, is a vacuum tube which gives a visual indication of the amplitude of an electronic signal, such as an audio output, radio-frequency signal strength, or other functions. The magic eye (also called a cat's eye, or tuning eye in North America) is a specific type of such a tube with a circular display similar to the EM34 illustrated. Its first broad application was as a tuning indicator in radio receivers, to give an indication of the relative strength of the received radio signal, to show when a radio station was properly tuned in.

The magic eye tube was the first in a line of development of cathode ray type tuning indicators developed as a cheaper alternative to needle movement meters. It was not until the 1960s that needle meters were made inexpensively enough in Japan to displace indicator tubes. Tuning indicator tubes were used in vacuum tube receivers from around 1936 to 1980, before vacuum tubes were replaced by transistors in radios. An earlier tuning aid which the magic eye replaced was the "tuneon" neon lamp.

== History ==
The magic eye tube (or valve) for tuning radio receivers was invented in 1932 by Allen B. DuMont (who spent most of the 1930s improving the lifetime of cathode ray tubes, and ultimately formed the DuMont Television Network).

The RCA 6E5 from 1935 was the first commercial tube.

The earlier types were end-viewed (EM34), usually with an octal or side-contact base. Later developments featured a smaller side-viewed noval B9A based all-glass type with either a fan type display or a band display (EM84). The end-viewed version had a round cone-shaped fluorescent screen together with the black cap that shielded the red light from the cathode/heater assembly. This design prompted the contemporary advertisers to coin the term magic eye, a term still used.

There was also a sub-miniature version with wire ends (Mullard DM70/DM71, Mazda 1M1/1M3, GEC/Marconi Y25) intended for battery operation, used in one Ever Ready AM/FM battery receiver with push-pull output, as well as a small number of AM/FM mains receivers, which lit the valve from the 6.3 V heater supply via a 220 ohm resistor or from the audio output valve's cathode bias. Some reel-to-reel tape recorders also used the DM70/DM71 to indicate recording level, including a transistorized model with the valve lit from the bias-oscillator voltage.

The function of a magic eye can be achieved with modern semiconductor circuitry and optoelectronic displays. The high voltages (100 volts or more) required by these tubes are no longer in modern devices, so the magic eye tube is obsolete.

== Method of operation ==
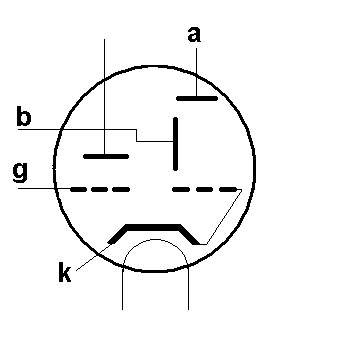
Schematic diagram of a magic eye indicator tube: a = anode, k = cathode, g = grid, b = deflection

A magic eye tube is a miniature cathode ray tube, usually with a built-in triode signal amplifier. It usually glows bright green, (occasionally yellow in some very old types, e.g., EM4) and the glowing ends grow to meet in the middle as the voltage on a control grid increases. It is used in a circuit that drives the grid with a voltage that changes with signal strength; as the tuning knob is turned, the gap in the eye becomes narrowest when a station is tuned in correctly.

Internally, the device is a vacuum tube consisting of two plate electrode assemblies, one creating a triode amplifier and the other a display section consisting of a conical-shaped target anode coated with zinc silicate or similar material. The display section's anode is usually directly connected to the receiver's full positive high tension (HT) voltage, whilst the triode-anode is usually (internally) connected to a control electrode mounted between the cathode and the target-anode, and externally connected to positive HT via a high-value resistor, typically 1 megaohm.

When the receiver is switched on but not tuned to a station, the target-anode glows green due to electrons striking it, with the exception of the area by the internal control-electrode. This electrode is typically 150–200 V negative with respect to the target-anode, repelling electrons from the target in this region, causing a dark sector to appear on the display.

The control-grid of the triode-amplifier section is connected to a point where a negative control voltage dependent on signal strength is available, e.g. the automatic gain control (AGC) line in an AM superheterodyne receiver, or the limiter stage or FM detector in an FM receiver. As a station is tuned in the triode-grid becomes more negative with respect to the common cathode.

== Use in radios ==
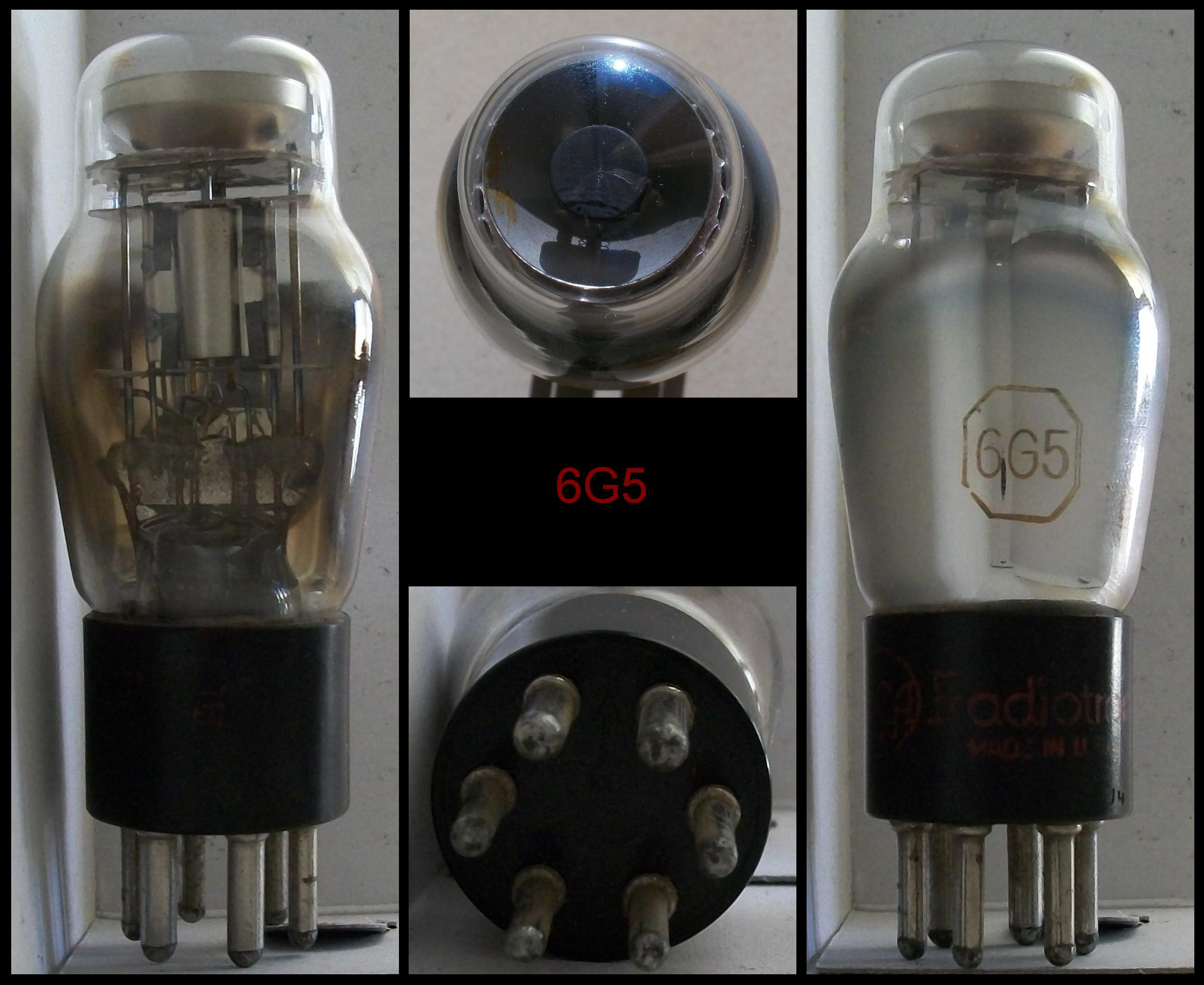
6G5 Magic eye tube

The purpose of magic eye tubes in radio sets is to help with accurate tuning to a station; the tube makes peaks in signal strength more obvious by producing a visual indication, which is better than using the ear alone. The eye is especially useful because the AGC action tends to increase the audio volume of a mistuned station, so the volume varies relatively little as the tuning knob is turned. The tuning eye was driven by the AGC voltage rather than the audio signal.

When, in the early 1950s, FM radio sets were made available on the UK market, there were many different types of magic eye tubes with differing displays, but they all worked the same way. Some had a separate small display to light up indicating a stereo signal on FM.

The British Leak company used an EM84 indicator as a very precise tuning-indicator in their Troughline FM tuner series, by mixing the AGC voltages from the two limiter valve grids at the indicator sensing-grid. By this means accurate tuning was indicated by a fully open sharp shadow, whilst off-tune the indicator produced a partially closed shadow.

== Common types ==
In U.S. made radios, the first type issued was the type 6E5 single pie shaped image, introduced by RCA and used in their 1936 line of radios. Other radio makers used the 6E5 as well until, soon after, the less sensitive type 6G5 was introduced. Also, a type 6AB5 aka 6N5 tube with lower plate voltage was introduced for series filament radios. Type number 6U5 was similar to the 6G5 but had a straight glass envelope. Zenith Radio used a type 6T5 in their 1938 model year radios with "Target tuning" indicator (resembling a camera iris), but was abandoned after a year, with Ken-Rad manufacturing a replacement type. All these types use a 6-pin base with two larger pins for filament connection.

Several other "eye tubes" were introduced in U.S. radios and also used in test equipment and audio gear, including the octal-based types 6AF6GT, 6AD6GT and 1629. The latter was an industrial type with 12 volt filament looking identical to type 6E5. Later U.S. made audio gear used European tubes like EM80 (equivalent to 6BR5), EM81 (6DA5), EM84 (6FG6), EM85 (6DG7) or EM87 (6HU6).

== Other applications ==
Magic eye tubes were used as the recording level indicator for tape recorders (for example in the Echolette), and it is also possible to use them (in a specially adapted circuit) as a means of rough frequency comparison as a simpler alternative to Lissajous figures.

A magic eye tube acts as an inexpensive uncalibrated (and not necessarily linear) voltage indicator, and can be used wherever an indication of voltage is needed, saving the cost of a more accurate calibrated meter.

At least one design of capacitance bridge uses this type of tube to indicate that the bridge is balanced.

The magic eye tube appears on the cover of My Morning Jacket's 2011 album Circuital. The tube is shown almost fully lit.

== See also ==
- S meter
- VU meter
- List of vacuum tubes
