= Seth Boyden Terrace =

Former public housing complex in Newark, New Jersey

- Interactive map of the Seth Boyden Terrace area

General information
- Location: 124 Seth Boyden Ter, Newark, NJ 07114
- Coordinates: 40.69551°N 74.20106°W
- Year built: 1938–1941
- Opened: 1941
- Closed: 2015
- Demolished: 2022
- Owner: Newark Housing Authority

The Seth Boyden Terrace, named after Seth Boyden, was a former public housing complex in the South Ward of Newark, New Jersey.

== Inception ==
The project, one of the City of Newark's first attempts at providing public housing, was built between 1938 and 1941, opening in late 1941. The three-story buildings, located at Frelinghuysen Avenue, Center Terrace, Dayton Street, and Seth Boyden Terrace, contained 530 apartments.

In 1942, the 530 families who lived in the project, including an estimated 1000 children, were put under quarantine when three children were stricken with paralysis. It was believed that the polio virus was the cause.

There is currently Seth Boyden Elderly housing still in use through the Newark Housing Authority. The Seth Boyden Terrace housing project in Newark was abandoned in 2015 after years of neglect and was demolished in 2022.

== Future ==
In 2022, it was announced the site of the housing project would be turned into television and film studios, soundstages, and Foley rooms as part of Lionsgate Newark Studios.
