= Reinhardt Mills =

- U.S. National Register of Historic Places
- New Jersey Register of Historic Places
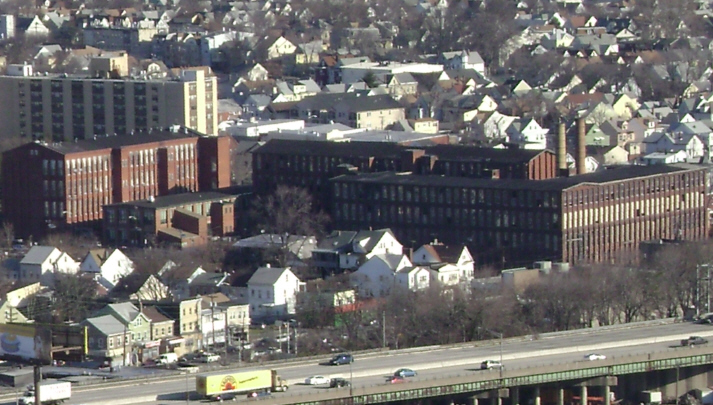
- The red brick Reinhardt Mills industrial complex is seen from Garret Mountain Reservation on First Watchung Mountain in late December, 2011.

- Location within Passaic County, New Jersey Location within New Jersey Location within the United States
- Location: 283–297 21st Avenue, 122–136 20th Avenue, 46–72 Gray Street, 45–67 State Street, Paterson, New Jersey
- Coordinates: 40°54′28″N 74°9′43″W
- Area: 1.8 acres (0.73 ha)
- Architectural style: Early Commercial
- NRHP reference No.: 03000393
- NJRHP No.: 4145

Significant dates
- Added to NRHP: May 9, 2003
- Designated NJRHP: March 24, 2003

Reinhardt Mills, later Boris Kroll Mills, is a historic silk mill complex located in Paterson, Passaic County, New Jersey, United States. The building was added to the National Register of Historic Places on May 9, 2003.

== Film studio ==
In 2026, Alan Mruvka announced plans for Filmology Labs to open at the Padded Wagon Building in the complex at 61 State Street.

== Other redevelopment ==
Part of the complex has been redeveloped as the Paterson Commons apartments with future plans for additional redevelopment. The Philip's Academy Charter School opened a campus on the site in 2016.

== See also ==
- National Register of Historic Places listings in Passaic County, New Jersey
- Netflix Studios Fort Monmouth
