= New Jersey Motion Picture and Television Commission =

Government agency in New Jersey, United States

New Jersey Motion Picture & Television Commission

Agency overview
- Formed: 1976
- Jurisdiction: New Jersey
- Headquarters: One Gateway Center, Newark, New Jersey, US
- Agency executive: Michael Uslan, Chairman
- Parent agency: New Jersey Economic Development Authority (Evan Weiss, CEO)
- Website: https://nj.gov/njfilm/index.shtml

The New Jersey Motion Picture & Television Commission is a U.S. state government entity that promotes and facilitates film and television production in New Jersey. The state is anticipated to become the third largest state for film and television production activity in 2026, behind New York and Los Angeles.

== Background ==
As the birthplace of American cinema prior to Hollywood, New Jersey has long held an attraction for producers, both for its locations and the tax credits offered by the state, which are granted by its parent agency, the New Jersey Economic Development Authority. The film commission's offices are located in Newark.

The NJMPTC's chair is Batman film producer Michael Uslan, who was appointed in 2016. In 2024, Emmy award-winning showrunner, director and television producer Joe Crowley was appointed as the executive director.

== History ==
The film commission was created in 1976 by Governor of New Jersey Brendan Byrne. Its first chairman was Pulitzer Prize-winning playwright and screenwriter Sidney Kingsley.

=== Christie administration ===
Governor of New Jersey Chris Christie suspended filming-related credits in 2010, but in 2011 the New Jersey State Legislature approved the restoration and expansion of the tax credit program. The program offered 20 percent tax credits statewide and 22% in urban enterprise zone, to television and film productions that met the standards for hiring and local spending. The tax credit was lower than that of other states offering similar incentives. A controversy arose in 2011, when the governor threatened to veto the payment of tax rebates to the production company of Jersey Shore, a program he and others felt negatively portrayed New Jersey. Ultimately, Christie vetoed legislation for the program's renewal and it lapsed for several years.

== New Jersey Film & Digital Media Tax Credit Program ==
When Governor Phil Murphy took office, he instated the New Jersey Film & Digital Media Tax Credit Program in 2018 and expanded it in 2020 and 2023. The initial benefits in 2018, prior to expansion, included a 30% tax credit on film projects and a 40% subsidy for studio developments.

A number of new production studios, such as Netflix Studios Fort Monmouth and Lionsgate Newark Studios are under development.

=== South Jersey ===
Murphy signed legislation in January 2023 increasing the state's digital media content production tax credit to 35% of qualified expenses purchased through vendors in the southern part of the state (Atlantic, Burlington, Camden, Cape May, Cumberland, Gloucester, Mercer and Salem counties).

== Film Ready Program ==
In 2023, New Jersey launched its Film Ready Program, encouraging more municipalities to become "film ready." The program, overseen by the commission, is a five-step certification and marketing initiative that prepares towns to handle film and TV production more efficiently and safely as designated film-ready communities. The program aims to attract more production companies to the state, as filmmaking is said to have contributed significantly to the local economy in New Jersey, bringing in over $650 million in 2022 alone. By becoming a "film-ready"-certified community by the state, municipalities make it more likely to obtain increased local spend by visiting productions. The towns additionally are said to gain publicity for tourism and local businesses by appearing in movies and television shows.

=== Local film offices ===
In 2023, two South Jersey counties, Gloucester and Camden, founded the South Jersey Film Office Cooperative to work with the commission to facilitate filming and the resultant economic activity in the area. The Union County film board in North Jersey also facilitates local filming, and other counties and the city of Newark have similar offices.

== Awards ==
In 2025, the commission was awarded the LGMI award for Outstanding Film Commission by the Location Managers Guild International. In 2020, it was nominated for the same award.

== See also ==
- Television and film in New Jersey
- List of film festivals in New Jersey
- Barrymore Film Center
- Film studios and soundstages in New Jersey
- Rutgers Filmmaking Center at Rutgers University in New Brunswick, New Jersey
- New Jersey Theatre Alliance
