= Netflix Studios Fort Monmouth =

Planned film production complex on New Jersey, U.S.

- Type: Film production facility
- Industry: Film and television production
- Founded: 2022
- Founder: Netflix
- Headquarters: Oceanport and Eatontown, New Jersey, United States
- Area served: Worldwide
- Products: Film and television production
- Owner: Netflix
- Parent: Netflix
- Website: www.netflixnewjersey.com

Netflix Studios Fort Monmouth is a planned film and television production complex being developed by Netflix on a portion of the former Fort Monmouth military installation in Monmouth County, New Jersey. The studio campus occupies approximately 292 acres of the former military base in the boroughs of Oceanport and Eatontown. The studio is intended to serve as Netflix's primary East Coast production hub.

The site is approximately five miles (8.0 km) from the Atlantic Ocean and is located near Seven Presidents Oceanfront Park and the beaches of Long Branch. The campus is approximately a 55–80 minute drive from lower Manhattan and about a 25–30 minute drive from Asbury Park.

== History of Fort Monmouth ==
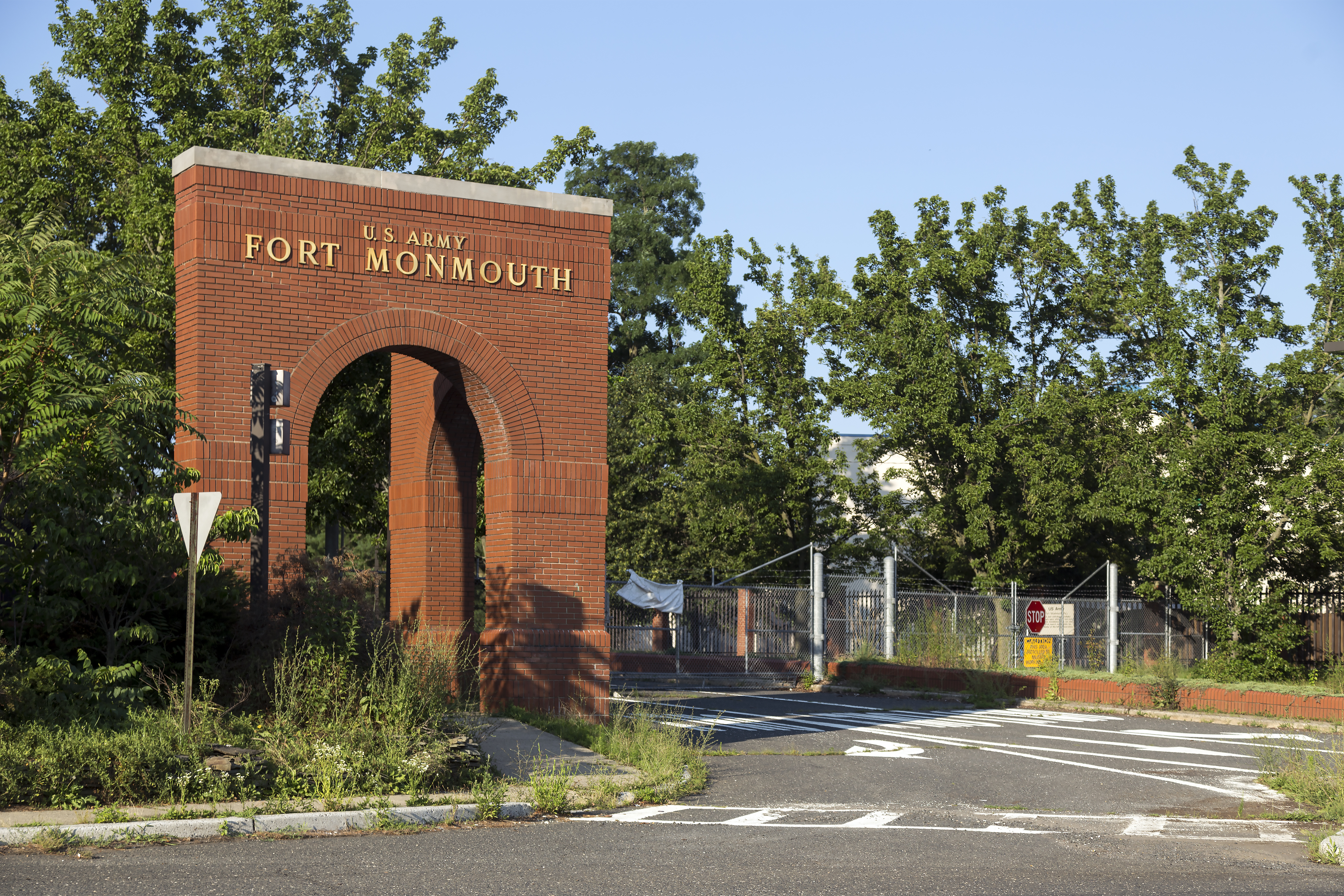
The main gate at Fort Monmouth, New Jersey, USA, after the base was closed and unmaintained

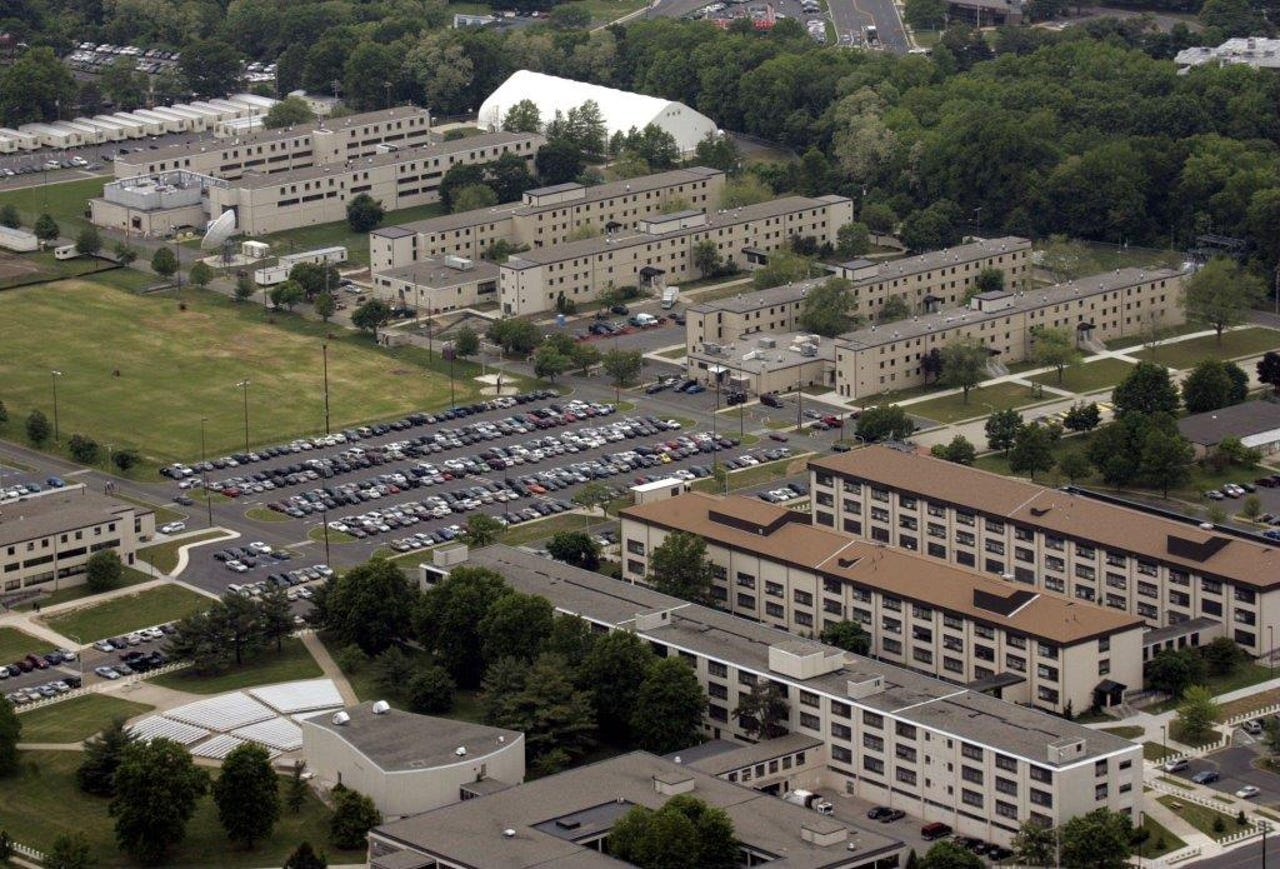
Aerial view of Fort Monmouth in 2008 prior to its closure

The studio campus is being developed on the former site of Fort Monmouth, a United States Army installation that operated from 1917 until its closure in 2011 following recommendations by the 2005 Base Realignment and Closure Commission.After the base closed, the Fort Monmouth Economic Revitalization Authority (FMERA) was established to oversee redevelopment of the 1,126-acre property.

== Development ==
Former Fort Monmouth Marina, now The Wharf at Oceanport, on a tributary of the Shrewsbury River

In October 2022, Netflix announced plans to acquire and redevelop the former Fort Monmouth Mega Parcel as a state-of-the-art film and television production campus.

The property was purchased for $55 million, with an initial projected investment of approximately $850 million in construction and infrastructure improvements. State officials estimated that the project would create approximately 1,500 permanent jobs and generate billions of dollars in economic activity for New Jersey.

On December 21, 2022, Governor Phil Murphy described the project as a "transformative investment" for New Jersey. Local officials in Oceanport and Eatontown also expressed support for the development, citing its anticipated economic and social benefits.

On February 21, 2024, the Fort Monmouth Economic Revitalization Authority unanimously approved zoning amendments necessary for the project to proceed.

On May 13, 2025, Netflix held a groundbreaking ceremony marking the start of construction. The company announced plans to invest approximately $1 billion in transforming the former military installation into a major production facility.

Demolition and site preparation began in 2025. The studio campus is projected to open in 2028.

== Facilities ==
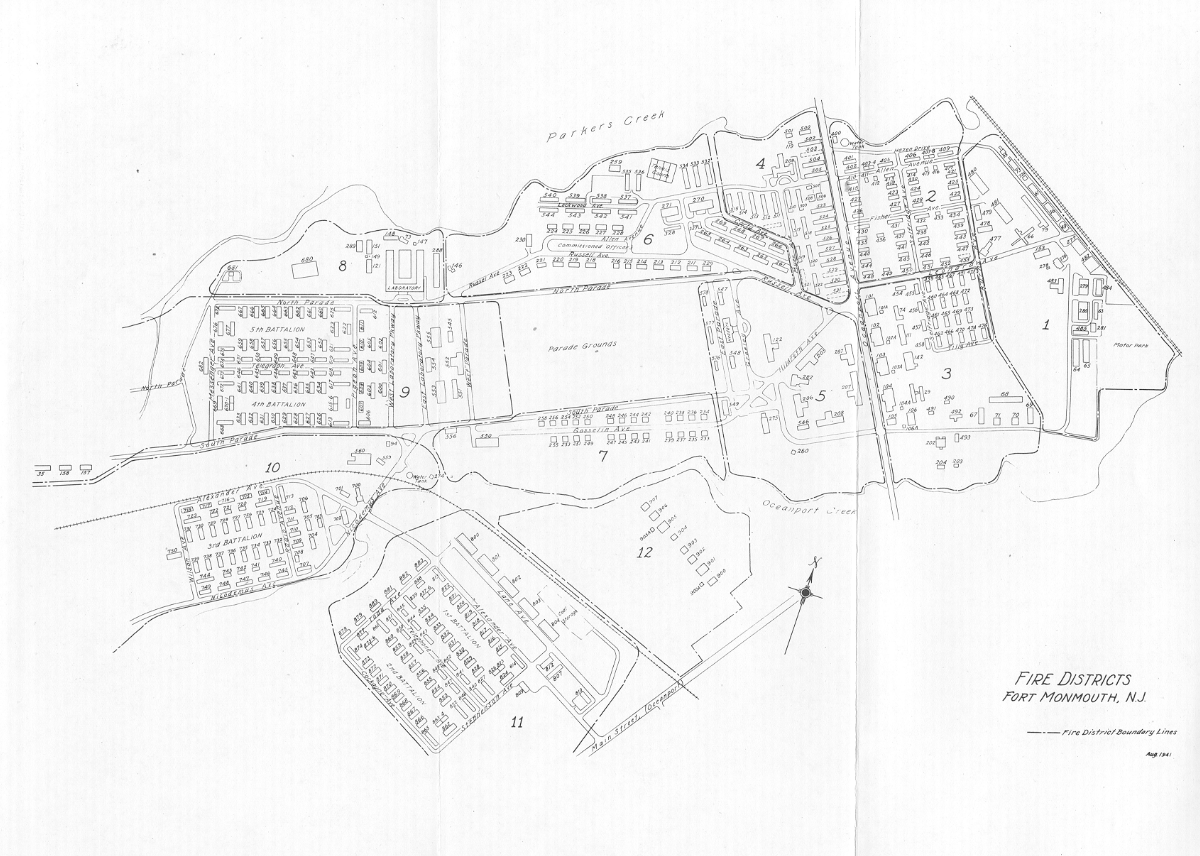
A map of Fort Monmouth in 1941.

The proposed studio campus will include:

- 12 sound stages
- Production support facilities
- Office buildings
- Post-production infrastructure
- Parking and transportation facilities

The sound stages are planned to total nearly 500,000 square feet of production space.

== Location, transportation and other features ==
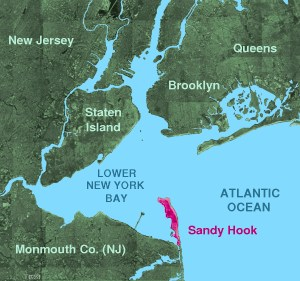
Sandy Hook, part of the Gateway National Recreation Area

The studio complex occupies a portion of the former Fort Monmouth property in Oceanport and Eatontown, New Jersey. The site is adjacent to major transportation routes including New Jersey Route 35, the Garden State Parkway, and nearby NJ Transit rail service.

Ferry service is additionally available from the area to and from New York City via NY Waterway and Seastreak companies.

The location is approximately five miles from the Atlantic coastline, south of the Sandy Hook peninsula at Gateway National Recreation Area.

The re-developed portions of the former installation are served by two school districts depending on their municipality: those in Eatontown attend Eatontown Public Schools for grades K-8 before continuing to Monmouth Regional High School in Tinton Falls, while those in Oceanport attend the Oceanport School District for grades K-8 before continuing to Shore Regional High School in West Long Branch.

St. Dorothea's Roman Catholic Church on Broad Street in Eatontown is located outside the former installation's main gate and part of the Diocese of Trenton under the Archdiocese of Newark. Residents of the redeveloped former installation are served by Brookdale Community College in Lincroft, the public community college for Monmouth County.

The Monmouth County Park System has operated the Fort Monmouth Recreation Center in the area since 2013. The campus is also located relatively near several New Jersey state parks, including Allaire State Park, Monmouth Battlefield State Park, Cheesequake State Park, and Island Beach State Park.

== Economic impact ==
The project is expected to create approximately 1,500 permanent jobs and generate significant economic activity for the surrounding region.

State redevelopment estimates projected that the facility could contribute up to $4.6 billion in economic activity over a twenty-year period.

== Other redevelopment at Fort Monmouth ==
Netflix Studios Fort Monmouth forms part of a broader redevelopment effort across the former military installation.

Other developments on the former Fort Monmouth property include:

- Redevelopment of the former commissary into a mixed-use destination featuring a microbrewery, specialty food businesses, and an entertainment venue offering dining, live music, virtual golf, and sports viewing.
- Development of a new medical campus by RWJBarnabas Health, including an ambulatory care pavilion and cancer center on the former Myer Center parcel
- In 2021, the former Fort Monmouth Marina, on a tributary of the Shrewsbury River, was purchased by restaurateurs at the site. It is now known as the Wharf at Oceanport.
- Development of Nicol NJ, by squash champion Peter Nicol, is a 20,000-square-foot racquet sports facility featuring padel, squash, and pickleball.
- Construction of 275 residential housing units, including affordable housing, on former military housing parcels in Eatontown.

== See also ==
- Television and film in New Jersey
- Film studios and soundstages in New Jersey
- Rutgers Filmmaking Center at Rutgers University in New Brunswick, New Jersey
- New Jersey Motion Picture and Television Commission
- Barrymore Film Center
- New Jersey live venues by capacity
- Count Basie Center for the Arts (performing arts center in nearby Red Bank, New Jersey)
- List of film festivals in New Jersey
- Bell Works (former Bell Labs complex with main structure by Eero Saarinen).
- Bruce Springsteen Center for American Music at Monmouth University
