= African Americans in New Jersey =

Ethnic group in New Jersey

Total population
- 1,519,770

Regions with significant populations
- North Jersey: Essex County (predominantly in Irvington and the Oranges, along with significant plurality communities in Maplewood, Montclair and Bloomfield); Newark (particularly in Weequahic, Vailsburg, Clinton Hill, Springfield/Belmont, West Side and Fairmount); Jersey City; Paterson; Bergen County (Teaneck, Hackensack and Englewood); Central Jersey: Union County (especially in Hillside, Roselle, Plainfield, Rahway, Linden, Union and Elizabeth); Trenton; Franklin; North Plainfield; North Brunswick; Piscataway; New Brunswick; South Jersey: Camden County (Lawnside, Camden, Winslow, Lindenwold, Pine Hill, Pennsauken, Gloucester and Collingswood); Burlington County (Willingboro, Burlington and Pemberton Township); Bridgeton; Salem; Jersey Shore: Asbury Park; Neptune; Pleasantville; Atlantic City; Somers Point; Hamilton

African American New Jerseyans are residents of the U.S. state of New Jersey who are of African American ancestry. As of the 2020 census, African Americans comprise approximately 15.4% of the state's population. The historical presence of African Americans in New Jersey can be traced back to the colonial era, during which enslaved Africans were transported to the state by Dutch and English settlers.

== History ==
The first European to encounter New Jersey was himself African, described at the time as mulatto. In 1525, while looking for the mythical Northwest Passage, Esteban Gomez, a Portuguese explorer for the Holy Roman Empire, sailed the Hudson River. In 1613, Jan Rodrigues, a Black man who sailed as a linguist for the Dutch, landed at Manhattan and learned the Lenape language, took a Native American wife, and decided to stay to live with and trade amongst the Munsee Lenape. Because the Lenape territory and the early Dutch fur trading networks spanned the broader Hudson River estuary, it is almost certain his travels and trading expeditions took him into the surrounding areas, including modern-day northeastern New Jersey, though no evidence has been found.

The arrival of the first African Americans in New Jersey can be traced back to the 17th century when Dutch settlers brought enslaved Africans to the region.

During the American Revolution, New Jersey became a battleground in the fight against British rule, with many joining the Continental Army and fighting for their own freedom. Notable figures such as Oliver Cromwell, an African American soldier, made significant contributions to the cause.

The early 19th century witnessed a gradual shift in the status of African Americans in New Jersey. The state passed laws that gradually abolished slavery, leading to the emancipation of enslaved individuals. However, racial discrimination and segregation persisted, limiting the opportunities available to African Americans.

The late 19th and early 20th centuries marked a period of significant migration for African Americans in New Jersey. Many individuals moved from the rural South to urban areas such as Newark and Camden in search of better economic prospects. This influx of African Americans contributed to the growth of vibrant communities and cultural institutions.

Notable figures such as Paul Robeson, a renowned actor, singer, and civil rights activist, emerged from the state, leaving a lasting impact on American culture.

== Population ==
In the 2020 Census, 1,219,770 New Jersey residents were identified as African American (of the total 9,288,994). In two of the state's 21 counties, African Americans make up more than 20% of the population: Essex (38.8%) and Union (20.4%). African Americans in the seven counties of Essex (335,047), Union (117,306), Camden (101,109), Middlesex (84,360), Hudson (79,498), Burlington (77,749), and Mercer (74,993) make up more than 71% of all African Americans in the state.

In northern New Jersey, the African American population is predominantly located in urban areas, specifically in the cities of Newark, Orange, East Orange, and Irvington and adjacent area of Essex County and Union County. Jersey City and Paterson are also home to significant African populations. In Bergen County, Engelwood, Teaneck and Hackensack have populations that are approximately 20% Black.

In Central Jersey, Trenton, Piscataway, Neptune, Long Branch and Asbury Park are home to significant African Americans populations.

South Jersey has a substantial African American population, primarily concentrated in Camden County, notably in Camden Willingboro, and Lawnside. Atlantic City has long had a concentration of African Americans. Salem has an African American population of over 50%.

== Notable people ==
=== Politics ===
- Cory Booker - Politician who served as the mayor of Newark from 2006 to 2013 and later became a United States Senator from New Jersey. Booker has been a vocal advocate for criminal justice reform and has championed various social issues.

=== Arts and entertainment ===
- Queen Latifah - An actress, singer, and rapper who has garnered critical acclaim for her versatile performances. She has received numerous accolades, including a Grammy Award and an Academy Award nomination.
- Lauryn Hill - A singer, songwriter, and rapper known for her soulful voice and thought-provoking lyrics. Hill achieved great success as a member of the hip-hop group Fugees and later as a solo artist.
- Paul Robeson - Entertainment industry figure, Robeson was a singer, actor, and civil rights activist. He gained international recognition for his powerful bass-baritone voice and his unwavering commitment to fighting racial injustice.

=== Sports ===
- Shaquille O'Neal - Basketball player who dominated the NBA for nearly two decades. O'Neal won multiple championships and earned numerous accolades, including being named an NBA Most Valuable Player.
- Carl Lewis - A track and field athlete who is widely regarded as one of the greatest Olympians of all time. Lewis won nine Olympic gold medals and set multiple world records during his illustrious career.
- Althea Gibson - Tennis player who became the first African American to win a Grand Slam title. Gibson's achievements paved the way for future generations of black athletes in the sport.

== See also ==
- Black history in Atlantic City, New Jersey
- African Americans in Georgia
- African Americans in South Carolina
- African Americans in Alabama
- African Americans in North Carolina
- African Americans in Virginia
- African Americans in New York City
- Delaware Moors
- Hispanics and Latinos in New Jersey
- History of slavery in New Jersey
- History of New Jersey
