= List of film festivals in New Jersey =

There are numerous film festivals in New Jersey. The municipalities of Asbury Park, Atlantic City, Newark, Jersey City, Princeton, Red Bank, and Teaneck each host a number of festivals throughout the year, as does Rutgers University in New Brunswick.

== A ==
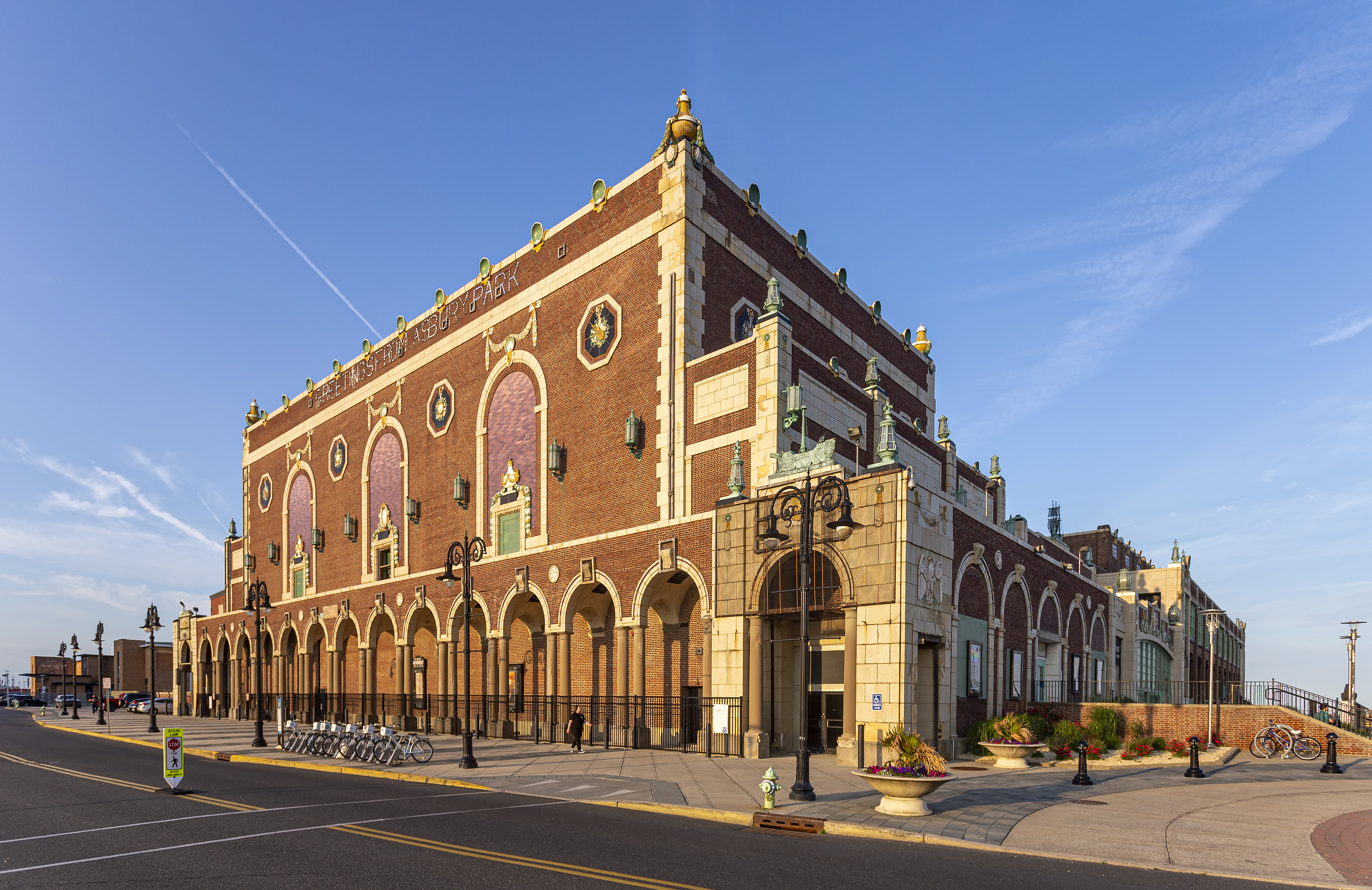
Paramount Theater in Asbury Park has featured numerous film festivals

- APin3 Film Challenge (Asbury Park) (timed filmmaking challenge)
- Arthouse Film Festival (established 1990) (South Orange)
- Asbury Park Music + Film Festival (established 2015) (Asbury Park)
- Atlantic City Cinefest / Downbeach Film Festival (established 2008) (Atlantic City)

== B ==
- B.E. (Black Excellence) Film Festival and Film Showcase (established 2021) (held during the larger Black Excellence Festival at The Showboat, Atlantic City)
- BFC Short Film Festival (established 2021) (Barrymore Film Center, Fort Lee)
- Bergen International Film Fest of New Jersey (established 2018) (Bergenfield)
- Boricua Film Festival (established 2025) (Rutherford) (Puerto Rican film)
- Bread and Roses Film Festival (established 2023) (ShowRoom Cinema, Asbury Park) (women's film festival)
- Brightside Film Festival (established 2014) (Jersey City)

== C ==
- Cherry Hill Jewish Film Festival (Cherry Hill)
- Colombian Film Festival (established 2013 in Manhattan) (Ritz Theater, Elizabeth touring location 2023)
- The Count Basie Center "BREAKTHROUGH" Film Festival (established ~2014) (Basie Center Cinemas, Red Bank) (young filmmakers)
- Cranford Film Festival (established 2021) (Cranford Theater, Cranford) (short film)

== E ==
- EB Indie Film Festival (established 2021) (East Brunswick)

== F ==
- FilmOneFest (established 2008) (outdoors at the Atlantic Highlands Marina, Atlantic Highlands) (short film)

== G ==
- Garden State Film Festival (established 1982) (Asbury Park and Cranford)
- Golden Door Film Festival (established 2011) (Jersey City)

== H ==
- Hang Onto Your Shorts Film Festival (established ~2012) (short film) (Asbury Park)
- Hoboken International Film Festival (established in 2006 in Hoboken, it relocated to Teaneck for a few seasons, and then to Orange County, New York in 2013.)

== I ==
- Indie Street Film Festival (established ~2015) (Two River Theater and others, Red Bank)
- Irish-American Comedy + Film Fleadh (established 2023) (Basie Center Cinemas, Red Bank)

== J ==
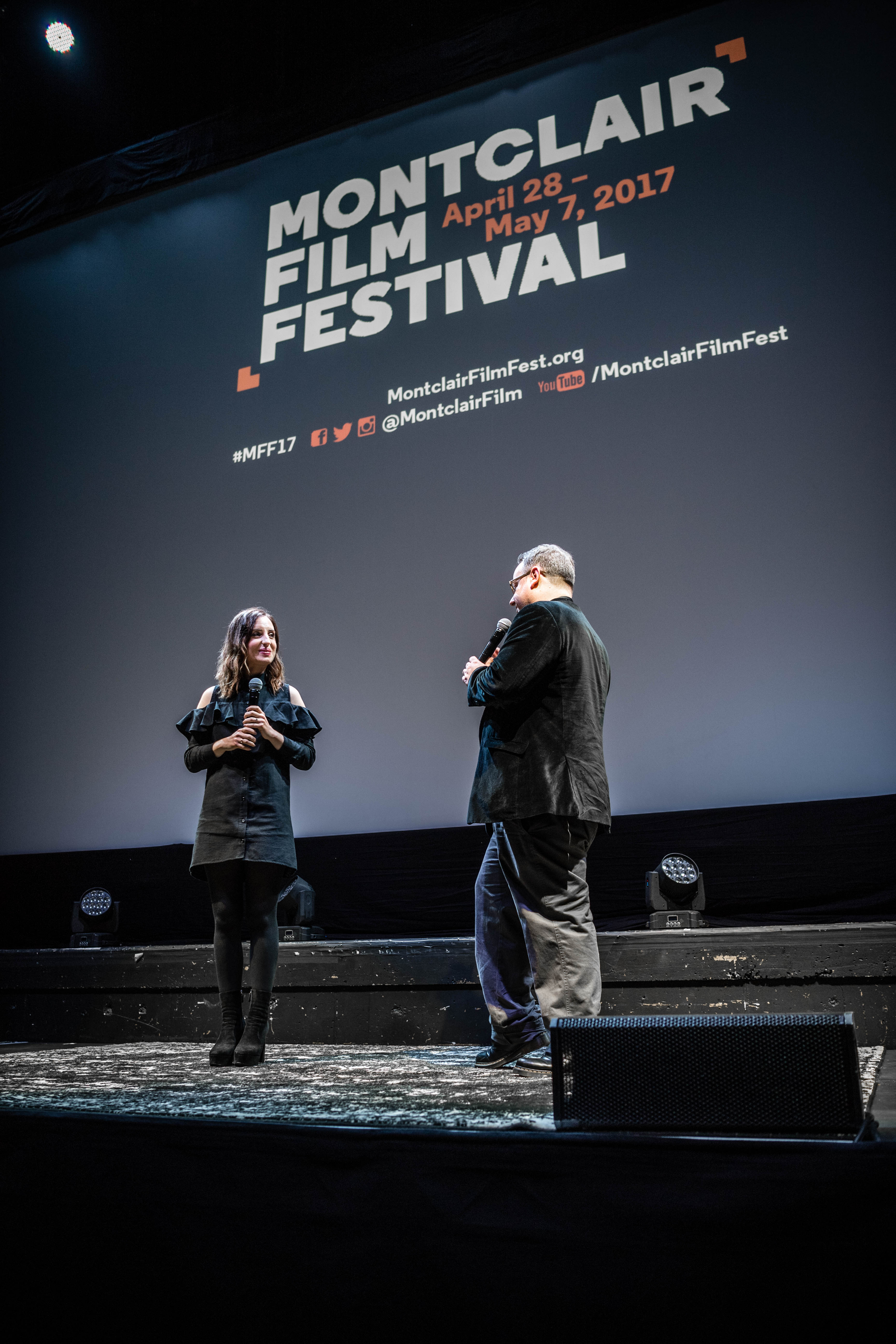
Montclair Film Festival 2017

- Jersey City Horror Film Festival (established ~2015) (Jersey City)
- Jersey Devil Film Festival (established ~2017) (Asbury Park) (folklore/cryptids/paranormal/horror)
- The Jersey Shore Film Festival (established 2006) (Deal, Long Branch, Asbury Park, Red Bank)
- Jewish Film Festival of Central New Jersey (The Cranford Theater, Cranford)

== K ==
- Krampus Film Festival (established ~2011) (Asbury Park) (horror/folklore/paranormal with a Yuletide focus)

== L ==
- Lambertville Halloween Film Festival (established 2022) (Lambertville)
- Lighthouse Film Festival (established 2009) (Long Beach Island)

== M ==
- Monmouth Film Festival (established 2016) (Bell Works, Holmdel)
- Montclair Film Festival (established 2012) (The Clairidge, Montclair)

== N ==
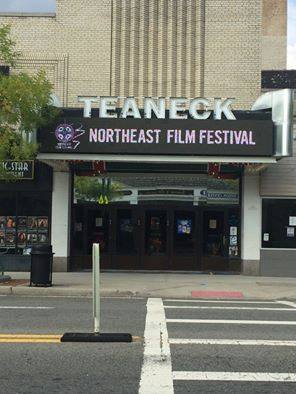
Northeast Film Festival, Teaneck

- Nassau Film Festival (established 2015) (Princeton Garden Theatre, Princeton)
- Newark Black Film Festival (established 1974) (Newark Museum of Art)
- Newark International Film Festival (established 2016) (held at North to Shore Festival, Newark)
- Newark LGBTQ Film Festival (established 2023) (Newark)
- Newark Short Film Festival (established ~2015) (New Jersey Institute of Technology, Newark)
- New Jersey Film Festival (established 1982) (Rutgers University–New Brunswick)
- New Jersey Horror Con and Film Festival (Atlantic City and Edison).
- New Jersey Independent Film Festival (established 2021) (Cranford Theater, Cranford)
- New Jersey Indian and International Film Festival (established 2018) https://njiiff.org (Regal Hadley Theater, South Plainfield; Oak Tree Road, Edison)
- New Jersey Jewish Film Festival (established 2000) (West Orange)
- New Jersey Young Filmmakers Festival (Thomas Edison National Historical Park, West Orange)
- New Lens Film Festival (Rutgers Filmmaking Center, Mason Gross School of the Arts at Rutgers University–New Brunswick)
- New York Asian Film Festival (Barrymore Film Center, Fort Lee served as one of the screening venues in 2023).
- Northeast Film Festival (established 2013) (Teaneck)

== P ==
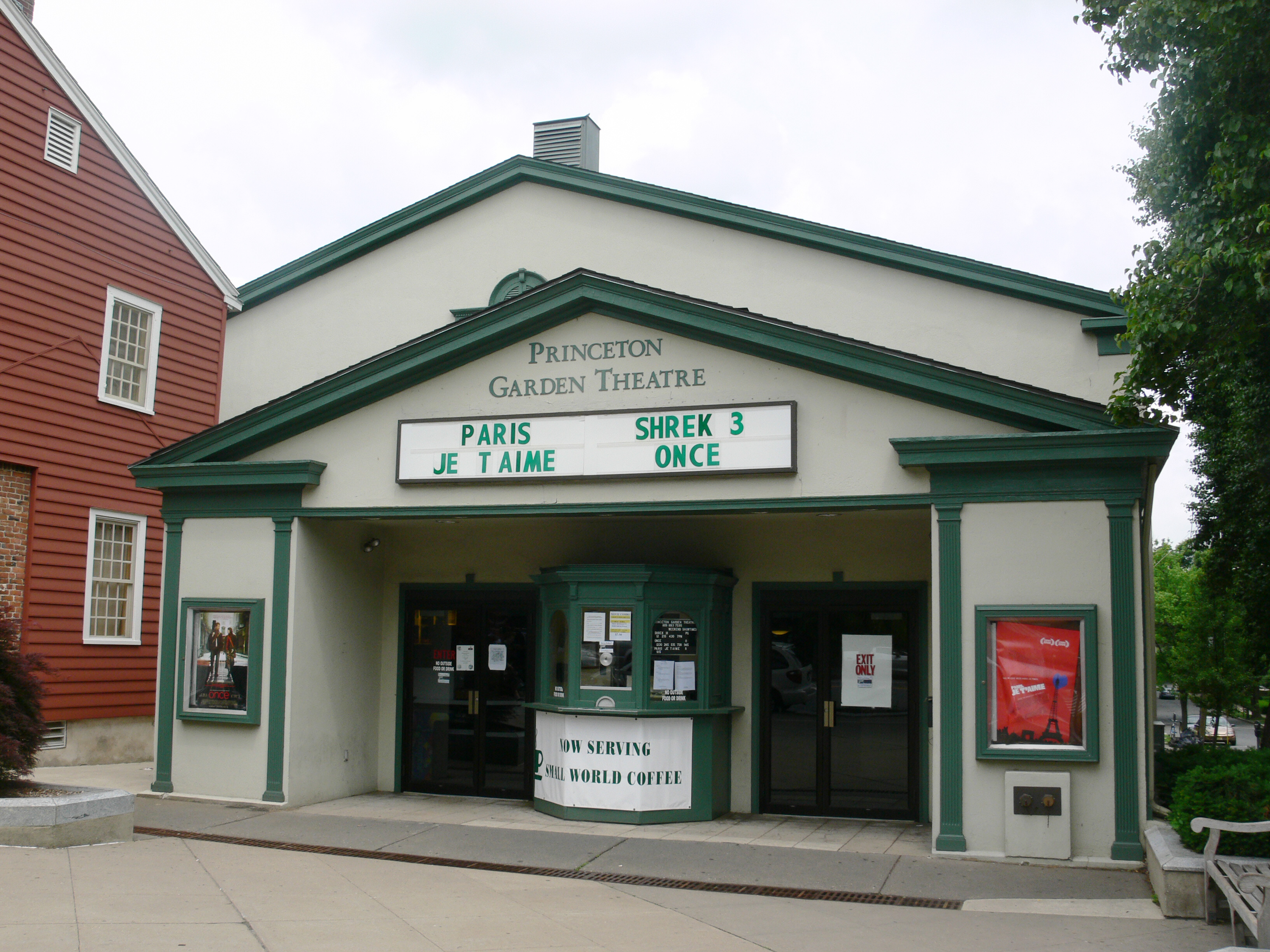
Princeton Garden Theatre hosts several festivals

- Princeton Environmental Film Festival (established 2007) (Princeton Public Library, Princeton)
- Princeton French Film Festival (established 2023) (Princeton University, Princeton)
- Princeton Student Film Festival (established 2003) (Princeton Public Library, Princeton)
- Princeton University Film Festival (Princeton University, Princeton)

== Q ==
- QFest New Jersey LGBTQ Film Festival (established ~2019) (Asbury Park)
- Queen City Film Festival (established 2018) (Plainfield) Annual three day film event founded by Lamar David Mackson, an American film and television executive, dedicated to providing underserved filmmakers of all experience levels with film screening events, audience development forums as well as career development and advancement opportunities. It generally takes place during the third weekend of October.

== R ==
- Ridgewood Guild International Film Festival (established ~2010) (Ridgewood)
- Rutgers Jewish Film Festival (established 1999) (Rutgers University–New Brunswick)

== S ==
- Smodcastle Film Festival (established 2022) (Kevin Smith's Smodcastle Cinemas, Atlantic Highlands)
- SOMA Film Festival (established ~2015) (South Orange and Maplewood)
- Student World Impact Film Festival, international festival based in New Jersey

== T ==
- Teaneck International Film Festival (established 2005) (Teaneck)
- Thomas Edison Film Festival (established 1981 as the Black Maria Film Festival to honor Edison's Black Maria at Kean Jersey City, then known as New Jersey City University) (traveling locations)
- Trenton Film Festival (established 2015) (Mill Hill, Trenton)

== U ==
- United States Super 8mm Film + Digital Video Festival (established ~1988) (Rutgers University-New Brunswick))
- UCPAC Film Festival (established 2024) (Rahway)

== See also ==
- List of film festivals in the United States
- Television and film in New Jersey
- North to Shore Festival
- List of festivals in New Jersey
- New Jersey Motion Picture & Television Commission
- Rutgers Filmmaking Center
