= Riverside Inn (Cranford, New Jersey) =

Dive bar in Cranford, New Jersey

The Riverside Inn
- Interactive map of The Riverside Inn
- Address: 56 North Avenue East
- Location: Cranford, New Jersey, U.S.
- Coordinates: 40.65641°N 74.300955°W
- Owner: Peter "Jake" Jacobs
- Type: Dive bar
- Public transit: Cranford station

The Riverside Inn, also known locally as "The Dive" or "The Riverdive," is a dive bar and restaurant in Cranford, New Jersey. Located along the Rahway River, the establishment is known as a neighborhood gathering place and for its long history in the community.

== Atmosphere ==
The bar's decor includes references to the Grateful Dead and other music-related memorabilia. Owner Peter "Jake" Jacobs is a longtime Deadhead, and Grateful Dead imagery is part of the bar's identity.

== History ==
The Riverside Inn received a post-Prohibition liquor license in the 1930s. The business changed ownership several times before being purchased in 1995 by Jacobs and his brother Jeffrey "Jocco" Jacobs. After Jeffrey Jacobs' death, Jacobs continued operating the bar.

== Recognition ==
The Riverside Inn has received recognition in New Jersey bar competitions and local publications.

In 2026, the Riverside Inn was named one of USA Today's Bars of the Year, recognizing bars selected by food journalists for their community connection and atmosphere.

In 2025, the Riverside Inn was named New Jersey's best "hole-in-the-wall" bar by Mashed. In 2024, the Riverside Inn was named New Jersey's best dive bar in a poll conducted by Tipsy Critic.

== See also ==
- WSOU
- The Aquarian Weekly
- Union County Performing Arts Center
- New Jersey music venues by capacity
- Crossroads (live music venue in neighboring Garwood)
- The Cranford Theater
- Georgies
