= Atlantic Shores Offshore Wind South =

American offshore wind energy project

Atlantic Shores South Project 1 and Project 2
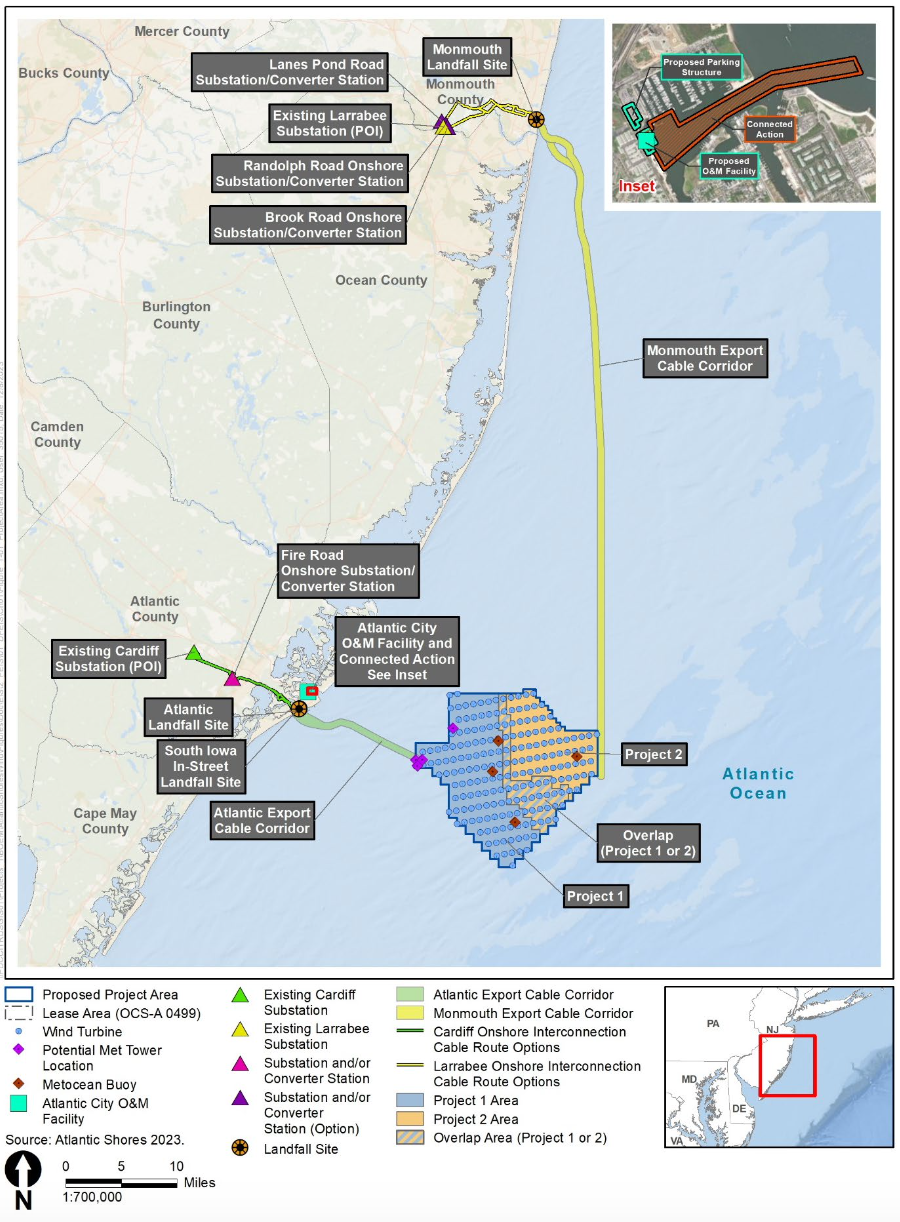
- Map of Interconnections for Atlantic Shores South
- Country: United States
- Location: Lease OCS-A 0499, off the coast of New Jersey
- Coordinates: 39°08′23″N 74°05′44″W
- Status: Approved For construction
- Owners: Atlantic Shores Offshore Wind, LLC

Wind farm
- Type: Offshore
- Distance from shore: 7.56 nautical miles (8.7 mi, 14 km)
- Hub height: 1047 ft (319 m)
- Rotor diameter: 919 ft (280 m)
- Site area: 183,353 acres (286 sq mi, 742 sq km)

Power generation
- Units operational: ~200
- Make and model: V236-15MW
- Units planned: 2,837 MW
- Nameplate capacity: Project 1: 1,510 MW; Project 2: 1,327 MW

External links
- Website: atlanticshoreswind.com/project1

Atlantic Shores Offshore Wind South, or Atlantic Shores South, is an offshore wind energy project located approximately 7.56 nautical miles (8.7 miles, 14 kilometers) off the coast of New Jersey between Atlantic City and Barnegat Light in the Atlantic Ocean. The project involves two phases: Atlantic Shores Offshore Wind Project 1 and Project 2, both of which are located within Lease OCS-A 0499. Together, the projects will include up to 200 Wind Turbine Generators (WTGs). Project 1 will make landfall in Atlantic City, New Jersey at the Atlantic Landfall Site and connect to the Cardiff substation located in Egg Harbor Township, New Jersey. Project 2 will make landfall in Sea Girt, New Jersey at the Monmouth Landfall Site and connect to the Larrabee substation located in Howell, New Jersey. The projects originally represented a 50:50 joint venture between Shell New Energies US, LLC and EDF-RE Offshore Development, LLC.

Atlantic Shores South's development process spans the last 10 years, from securing the lease in 2015 to obtaining approvals in 2024. During this period, the project encountered several challenges, such as community opposition and potential adverse impacts on marine mammals and fisheries. Despite these challenges, the Bureau of Ocean Energy Management (BOEM) approved the project's Construction and Operations Plan (COP) in October 2024, permitting construction to begin. Project 1 is approved to have between 105-136 WTGs, with a capacity of 1,510 megawatts (MW). Project 2 is expected to have between 64-95 WTGs. The capacity for Project 2 is not yet determined, but Atlantic Shores has a goal of 1,327 MW.

Atlantic Shores South was awarded a contract by the New Jersey Board of Public Utilities (BPU) following a solicitation for 1,200-2,400 MW of offshore wind generation in 2021. The project is expected to provide 30% of the energy needed to help New Jersey meet its offshore wind energy target of 11,000 MW by 2040, as ordered by Governor Phil Murphy's Executive Order No. 307 in late 2022. As of the beginning of 2025, the project has received all approvals necessary to begin construction. Construction was estimated to begin in late 2025, but in February 2025, the project faced significant uncertainty after Shell withdrew from the joint venture, citing increased competition, delays, and shifting federal policies under the Trump administration. The future of Atlantic Shores South was further complicated by the New Jersey BPU's decision not to award new offshore wind contracts in a planned Fourth Solicitation, which was influenced by Shell's departure and recent federal policy shifts. Following these decisions, EDF Renewables, the remaining partner, recorded a €934 million impairment (approximately $980 million) but reaffirmed its commitment to the project.

== Development timeline ==
The Atlantic Shores South Project 1 follows a four-phase development timeline: Early Development & Planning (2011–2022), Environmental Review & Permitting (2021–2024), Record of Decision & Approvals (2021–2024), and Construction & Installation (2025–2028). The project began with BOEM’s leasing process in 2011, progressing through environmental assessments and lease transfers, before forming a 50:50 joint venture between EDF Renewables and Shell New Energies US in 2019. Regulatory milestones include permit applications in 2021, a Draft EIS in 2023, and a Final Environmental Impact Statement (EIS) in 2024, culminating in BOEM’s approval of the Construction and Operations Plan (COP) in October 2024. However, in February 2025, Shell withdrew from the project, leaving EDF Renewables as the sole developer. Around the same time, New Jersey’s BPU rejected new offshore wind projects in its Fourth Solicitation, and President Donald Trump issued an executive order restricting new permits, casting uncertainty over whether construction—originally scheduled for late 2025—will proceed as planned.

Early development and planning:

- April 2011: Bureau of Ocean Energy Management (BOEM) releases Call for Information and Nominations to assess interest in Call Area, and BOEM designates the Wind Energy Area (WEA).
- February 2012: Environmental Assessment completed with Findings of No Significant Impact.
- November 2015: BOEM holds lease auction for Lease Area OSC-A 0499. RES America and U.S. Wind, Inc. win leases in the sale.
- December 2018: BOEM approves an application to assign 100 percent of Lease Area OCS-A 0499 to EDF Renewables Development, Inc.
- August 2019: BOEM approves an application to assign 100 percent of Lease Area OCS-A 0499 to Atlantic Shores Offshore Wind, LLC.
- April 2021: BOEM approves the Site Assessment Plan.
- April 2022: BOEM approves a partial assignment of the southern portion of Lease OCS-A 0499 to Atlantic Shores Offshore Wind Project 1, LLC. The northern portion of OCS-A 0499 is retained by Atlantic Shores Offshore Wind, LLC and given a new lease number (OCS-A 0549).

Environmental review and Permitting

- March 2021: Atlantic Shores submits initial Construction and Operations Plan.
- May 2023: BOEM releases Draft EIS.
- December 2023: United States Fish and Wildlife Service and National Marine Fisheries Service issue Biological Opinions for Endangered Species Act-listed species within their jurisdictions. NMFS designates the lease area as a critical habitat for the North Atlantic Right Whale.
- May 2024: BOEM releases Final EIS

Record of decision and approvals

- June 2021: The New Jersey Board of Public Utilities awards Atlantic Shores an Offshore Renewable Energy Credit.
- July 2024: BOEM and other federal agencies issue joint Record of Decision.
- October 2024: BOEM approves final COP and NOAA issues an Incidental Take Authorization.

Construction and installation

- February 2025: Shell New Energies US, LLC announces that it is ceasing development with the project.
- February 2025: EDF Renewables records a €934 million impairment related to the project.
- Late 2025: Anticipated start of construction.
- 2028: Anticipated completion of construction.

== Lease area ==
=== Location ===
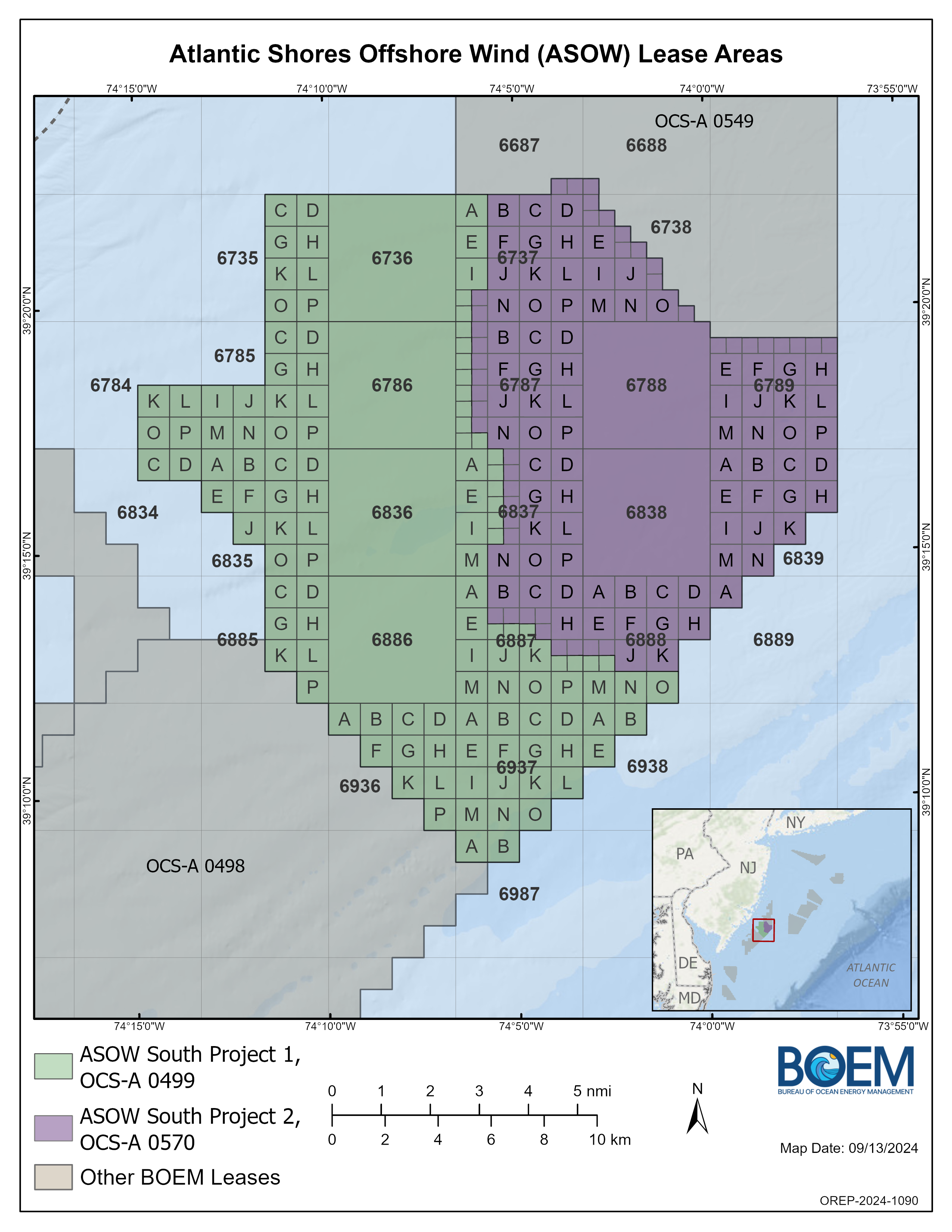
Atlantic Shores South Lease Area

Atlantic Shores South, which includes Project 1 and Project 2, is located on Commercial Lease OCS-A 0499. The leased area comprises 183,353 acres (286 sq mi, 742 sq km). The project is situated within the southern portion of Lease Area OCS-A 0499. Projects 1 and 2 will be located in a 102,124 acre Wind Turbine Area (WTA) section of the lease area. Project 1 occupies the western 54,175 acres of the WTA. Project 2 is located in the eastern 31,847 acres of the WTA. There is a 16,102 acre overlap area that can be used for either Project 1 or Project 2. The WTA's closest point is approximately 7.56 nautical miles (8.7 mi, 14 km) from the New Jersey shoreline between Atlantic City and Barnegat Light.

=== History of lease area ===
In 2009, the Bureau of Ocean Energy Management (BOEM) initiated the renewable energy program (authorized under the Energy Policy Act of 2005), which provides a structure for regional planning and analysis, lease issuance, site assessment, and construction and operations. Also in 2009, BOEM formed the BOEM/New Jersey Renewable Energy Task Force for coordination among affected federal agencies, as well as state, local, and tribal governments, throughout the leasing process. In 2012, BOEM published a Final Environmental Assessment (EA) and Finding of No Significant Impact (FONSI) for commercial wind lease issuance and site assessment activities on the Atlantic Outer Continental Shelf (OCS) offshore New Jersey, Delaware, Maryland, and Virginia. In 2014, BOEM published a Proposed Sale Notice (PSN) for the area of the continental shelf that includes Lease OCS-A-0499 and Lease OCS-A 0498. Then, in September 2015, BOEM published a Final Sale Notice for the commercial lease sale of the Wind Energy Area (WEA) offshore New Jersey.

On November 9, 2015, BOEM held a competitive lease sale for the WEA offshore New Jersey, auctioning two separate lease areas (OCS-A 0498 and OCS-A 0499). The auction received a total of $1,866,955 in high bids across both areas over seven rounds. US Wind Inc. submitted the highest live bid of $1,006,240, specifically for the North Lease Area (OCS-A 0499), and was awarded the lease. Lease OCS-A 0499 became effective on March 1, 2016. BOEM approved requests to extend the preliminary term on June 10, 2016, and February 14, 2018. The lease then changed hands multiple times. In 2018, US Wind Inc. sold their leasing rights to EDF Renewables for $215 million, plus a deferred variable payment. EDF Renewables is a subsidiary of the French utility EDF group, who develops and finances the construction of renewable energy facilities. In 2019, BOEM approved a new assignment of the lease area to Atlantic Shores Offshore Wind, LLC. A 50:50 joint venture with Shell New Energies was created to share financial responsibilities while developing the project, but Shell dropped its involvement in February 2025. Following the sale to Atlantic Shores, the initial lease area—OCS-A 0499—was then divided into two separate lease areas in 2021. Atlantic Shores assigned the southern portion of the lease area to Atlantic Shores Offshore Wind Project 1, LLC and Atlantic Shores Offshore Wind Project 2, LLC. Each project has a 50 percent interest to better manage the development and operations of the wind facilities, aligning with New Jersey BPU's goals for the project. The northern section of the original lease area received a new lease number—OCS-A 0549—and was assigned as "Atlantic Shores North." The lease operations term for OCS-A 0499 extends 25 years from the approval of the Construction and Operations Plan (COP), which was granted in 2024, meaning the lease is valid until 2049. The yearly rent for the lease area is $550,059.

== Regulatory and permitting process ==
Three critical parts of the regulatory and permitting process are the Construction and Operations Plan (COP), the Site Assessment Plan (SAP), and the Environmental Impact Statement (EIS). The SAP was approved by BOEM in April 2021, allowing for the installation of two meteorological buoys to collect data. Atlantic Shores South's COP was submitted to BOEM in March 2021. The most recent update was provided in June 2024, and it was approved in October 2024, enabling construction to begin on the project. A Notice of Availability (NOA) for the final EIS was published in May 2024. A significant gap exists between the final EIS and previous work in 2021, partly because the National Marine Fisheries Service (NMFS) designated the lease area as a critical habitat for the North Atlantic Right Whale, a species protected under the Endangered Species Act. In response, the National Oceanic and Atmospheric Administration (NOAA) issued final regulations in October 2024 governing the incidental harassment of marine mammals during construction. The associated Letter of Authorization (LOA), effective from January 1, 2025 through December 31, 2029, permits Atlantic Shores Offshore Wind Project 1, LLC to incidentally take marine mammals (whales, dolphins, seals) during construction and operations.

=== Site assessment plan ===
In December 2019, Atlantic Shores Offshore Wind submitted a site assessment plan (SAP) for the installation, operation, and decommissioning of two floating light detection and ranging (FLiDAR) buoys. Following a series of revisions from February to November 2020, the plan received final approval in 2021. The SAP details the technical specifications of the SEAWATCH buoys, their mooring systems, power supply, and instrumentation for measuring wind speed, ocean currents, and atmospheric conditions. The buoys are intended to collect meteorological data and oceanographic conditions in the lease area, which will be used to support offshore wind energy development in the region.

The SAP also describes the project’s compliance with BOEM regulations, environmental assessments, and necessary federal and state permits. It highlights compliance with the Marine Mammal Protection Act, Endangered Species Act, and other federal regulations. The document also details mitigation strategies for environmental impacts. For example, a 50-meter avoidance buffer around potential cultural sites and guidelines is suggested to prevent vessel strikes on marine mammals and sea turtles. The SAP further outlines regular maintenance schedules, reporting requirements, and decommissioning procedures to ensure long-term sustainability while adhering to national renewable energy goals.

=== Environmental impact statement ===
The environmental impact statement (EIS) process evaluates the potential impacts of the Atlantic Shores Offshore Wind South Project on physical, biological, socioeconomic, and cultural resources. BOEM prepares the EIS in accordance with the National Environmental Policy Act (NEPA). The process involves a public scoping period to gather input on significant resources, impact-producing factors, reasonable alternatives, and potential mitigation measures. Creating the EIS is a long process that often costs millions of dollars. The estimated lead agency costs associated with developing the Final EIS for Atlantic Shores South is $3,771,160. Although BOEM oversees the process, the project developer (Atlantic Shores Offshore Wind, LLC) is responsible for covering the costs of environmental review. BOEM then uses the EIS to inform its decision on whether to approve, approve with modifications, or disapprove a project's COP. Other agencies, such as the U.S. Army Corps of Engineers (USACE) and NMFS may adopt the EIS to support their decision-making. The Final EIS was published in May 2024 and includes five detailed alternatives to Atlantic Shores South's Proposed Action.

- Alternative A (No Action): BOEM does not approve the COP, meaning the project would not proceed. As a result, construction, installation, operation, maintenance, and decommissioning would not take place.
- Alternative B (Proposed Action): BOEM approves the COP, allowing Atlantic Shores Offshore Wind, LLC to proceed with both Project 1 and Project 2 as planned.
- Alternative C (Habitat Impact Minimization/Fisheries Habitat Impact Minimization): BOEM approves the construction, installation, operation, maintenance, and decommissioning of Project 1 and Project 2, but mitigation measures would be implemented to reduce habitat impacts. This alternative includes four sub-alternatives, each focusing on specific mitigation strategies. Most mitigation techniques involve removing certain wind turbine generators (WTGs) to minimize environmental disturbances.
- Alternative D (No Surface Occupancy at Select Locations to Reduce Visual Impacts): BOEM approves the project, but specific WTG positions would be eliminated to reduce visual impacts from the shoreline. Three sub-alternatives propose different configurations for removing turbines that are most visible from coastal areas and popular viewpoints. The adjustments focus on minimizing the daytime silhouette and nighttime lighting effects of the wind turbines, particularly in locations where they would have the greatest aesthetic impact on residents and visitors. Most sub-alternatives involve removing WTGs closest to shore, ensuring the project remains less visually intrusive.
- Alternative E (WTG Layout Modification to Establish a Setback between Atlantic Shores South and Ocean Wind 1): This alternative creates a buffer zone between Atlantic Shores South and Ocean Wind 1 by removing two WTGs and micrositing one WTG from Project 1. Micrositing involves adjusting the placement of structures within a defined area to minimize habitat disruption.
- Alternative F (Foundation Structures): This alternative evaluates multiple foundation types for WTGs, Offshore Substations (OSS), and the meteorological tower. Three sub-alternatives are proposed, each utilizing a different foundation type. The foundation types proposed include piled foundations (monopile and piled jacket), suction bucket foundations (mono-bucket, suction bucket jacket, suction bucket tetrahedron), and gravity-based foundations (gravity-pad tetrahedron and gravity-based structure).
- Preferred Alternative: The Preferred Alternative integrates key elements from multiple alternatives to optimize environmental and operational benefits. It includes the micrositing of 29 wind turbine generators (WTGs), 1 OSS, and associated interarray cables, as well as the removal of up to six turbines no more than 10.8 miles from the shore. A modified wind turbine layout will also be used to establish a setback between Atlantic Shores South and Ocean Wind 1. Additionally, the Preferred Alternative would require the proposed OSSs, meteorological tower, and WTGs to be aligned in a uniform grid.

Each of these alternatives were evaluated to determine which would have the least amount of environmental impact across a range of categories. Impacts on marine mammals, commercial fisheries and for-hire recreational fishing, cultural resources, navigational and vessel traffic, scenic and visual resources, and "other uses" were evaluated. “Other Uses” refers to marine mineral extraction, military and national security use, aviation and air traffic, cables and pipelines, radar systems, and scientific research and surveys. Each of these factors were evaluated by looking at the potential for harm from accidental releases, anchoring, cable emplacement and maintenance, gear utilization, land disturbance, lighting, noise, port utilization, presence of structures, and traffic. Based on these factors, each alternative was characterized using a four-level classification scheme, which considers context, intensity, directionality, and duration of effects. Impacts of the alternatives were then broadly classified by impact level as "negligible," "minor," "moderate," or "major" and impact type as 'beneficial" or "adverse" on the variety of environmental factors discussed in the report.

=== Record of Decision and final approvals ===
On July 1, 2024, a joint Record of Decision (ROD) by BOEM, NOAA, NMFS, and USACE for Atlantic Shores South was published. In the document, BOEM outlined its decision to approve the project's COP, NMFS issued of a Letter of Authorization (LOA) under the Marine Mammal Protection Act (MMPA), and USACE issued permits under the Rivers and Harbors Act (RHA) of 1899, the Clean Water Act (CWA), and the Marine Protection, Research, and Sanctuaries Act (MPRSA). These are all necessary actions for the project to begin construction. The ROD follows the requirements of the NEPA and includes various mitigation measures across different areas to minimize the adverse environmental impacts of Atlantic Shores South. These measures include protections for marine archaeological resources, archaeological monitoring during onshore construction in sensitive areas, and measures to reduce visual impacts, as well as measures for vessel operation, aircraft detection lighting, debris prevention, avian and bat protection, fisheries, high-frequency radar interference, and protected species. The ROD also includes conditions for foundation scour protection monitoring and cable protection. BOEM announced the final approval of the COP with the "Preferred Alternative" on October 1, 2024.

== Financing ==
=== Offtake agreement ===
Proposed offshore wind projects can apply for Offshore Wind Renewable Energy Credits (ORECs) through state solicitations. Project 1 was awarded an OREC agreement as part of New Jersey's Second Solicitation in June 2021. However, Project 2 was rejected during the Third Solicitation in January 2024 due to high bid prices. In March 2024, the New Jersey Board of Public Utilities (BPU) launched a Fourth Solicitation, allowing companies to re-bid existing OREC prices. Both Project 1 and Project 2 submitted bids, but in February 2025, the Board declined to issue awards due to a lack of final offers and Shell’s withdrawal from Atlantic Shores South as an equity partner. Under its current solicitation, Project 1 is entitled to collect OREC fees at $86.62/MWh beginning in 2028. The fees increase to $141.92/MWh in 2048. The leveled cost of energy (LCOE) for the OREC prices is $114.03/MWh, including transmission costs of $6-10/MWh.

=== Cost and finance structure ===
Both projects also qualify for federal tax credits. Under the 2022 Inflation Reduction Act (IRA), offshore wind projects are eligible for a 30% Investment Tax Credit of the capital costs of the project. NJ BPU uses Levitan & Associates, Inc. (LAI) to evaluate bids for its solicitations. LAI assumed in their bid evaluations of Atlantic Shores South that available federal tax credits were included to offset the capital costs. The additional financial information Atlantic Shores Offshore Wind, LLC submitted in their bid to the NJ BPU is currently redacted.

In February 2025, Shell withdrew from Atlantic Shores South, citing financial considerations. CFO Sinead Gorman stated that the project did not align with Shell’s capabilities or expected returns. As a result, Shell will incur a $996 million impairment charge. Despite this, Atlantic Shores Offshore Wind, LLC stated that it remains committed to New Jersey and the development of the state’s first offshore wind project.

== Infrastructure and development ==
If the project proceeds as planned, construction is expected to begin in the first quarter of 2025 with the installation of onshore interconnection cables for Project 1. To maximize efficiency, the construction schedules for Project 1 and Project 2 are planned to share installation teams and equipment, which would help reduce costs and environmental impacts. The majority of adverse effects are anticipated to occur during construction and installation activities. The construction sequence would begin with onshore facilities, followed by the installation of offshore export cables, wind turbine generators (WTGs), and Offshore Substations (OSSs).

=== Construction timeline ===
Activity	Expected Duration	Project 1 Start Date	Project 2 Start Date
Onshore Interconnection Cable Installation	9-12 months	Q1-2025	Q1-2026
Onshore Substation and/or Convertor Station Construction	18-24 months	Q1-2025	Q1-2026
HRG Survey Activities	3-6 months	Q2-2025	Q1-2026
Export Cable Installation	6-9 months	Q2-2026	Q3-2027
Coffer Dam Installation and Removal	18-24 months	Q2-2025	Q3-2026
OSS Installation and Commissioning	5-7 months	Q2-2026	Q2-2027
WTG Foundation Installation	10 months	Q1-2026	Q1-2027
Inter-Array Cable Installation	14 months	Q2-2026	Q3-2027
WTG Installation and Commissioning	17 months	Q2-2026	Q1-2028

=== Offshore wind farm ===
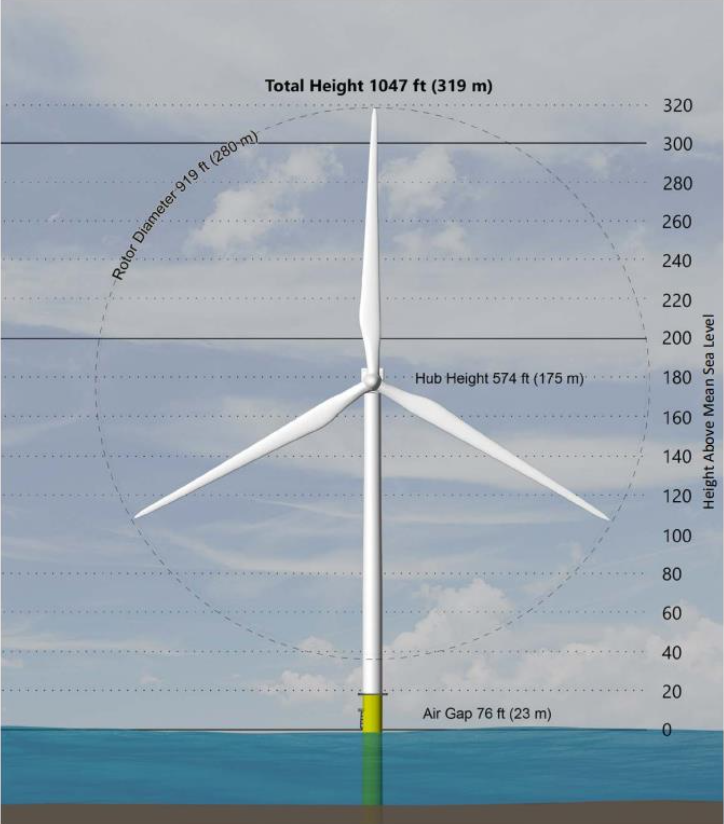
WTGs for Atlantic Shores South

In 2022, Atlantic Shores selected Vestas as their preferred turbine supplier, opting for the V236-15MW offshore wind turbines. These WTGs have a 379 ft (115.5 m) blade and a 919 ft (280 m) rotor diameter, which can achieve a capacity factor exceeding 60%, enabling fewer turbines to generate more energy efficiently and sustainably over its 30-year engineered lifespan. The WTGs have a cut in wind speed of 3 m/s and a cut out wind speed of 31 m/s. They have a tip height of 319 m and a hub height of 175 m. WTG foundations for Project 1 will consist of monopiles, while Project 2 will use either monopiles or piled jackets. Piled foundations will be installed using jack-up vessels or heavy-lift vessels. Monopiles are expected to take 7-9 hours to drive, with a maximum of two monopiles installed per day per vessel. The WTGs will be arranged in a grid layout with east-northeast/west-southwest rows and approximately north/south columns. There will be 105-136 WTGs for Project 1 and 64-95 WTGs for Project 2.

One permanent meteorological tower will be installed for Project 1 in one of four potential locations in the Project 1 area of the lease. The maximum height of the tower would not exceed 16.5 feet (5 m) above the hub height of the largest WTG installed, which is estimated to be 590.6 feet (180 m). The tower would be composed of square lattice consisting of tubular steel and would be equipped with a deck that would be about 50 ft by 50 ft (15 m by 15 m). Up to four temporary metocean buoys would also be installed, with three in Project 1 and one in Project 2.

=== Grid interconnection ===
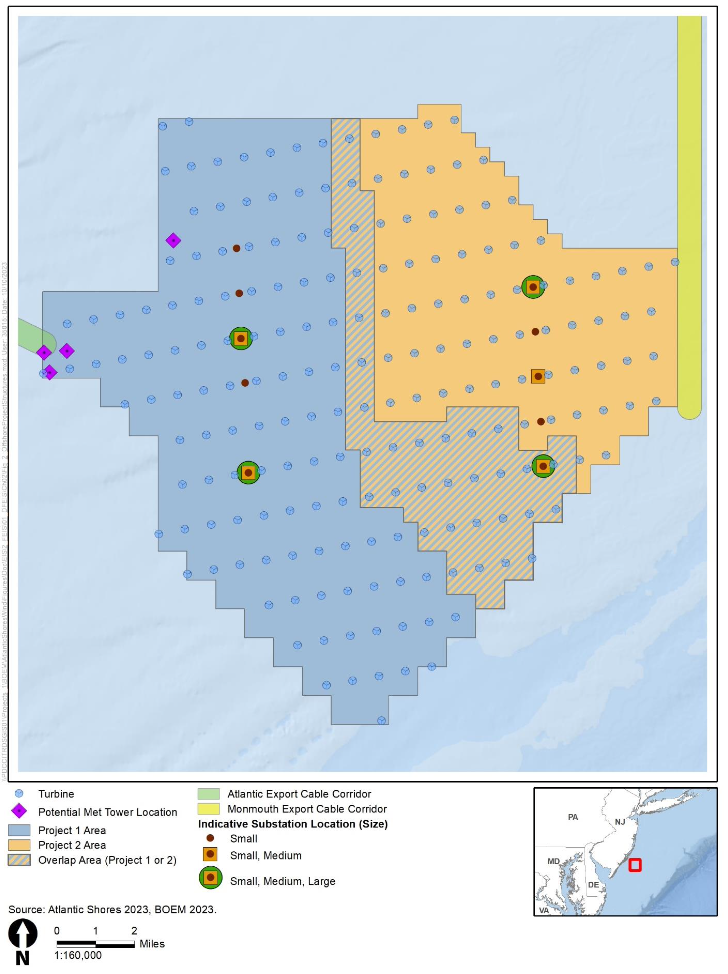
Structure Layout of Atlantic Shores South

==== Onshore facilities ====
The onshore facilities for the projects include onshore substations or converter stations depending on the export cables used, as well as onshore interconnection cables. Each Point of Interconnection (POI) will have one onshore substation. The onshore interconnection cables will be 230–275 kV HVAC cables or 320–525 kV HVDC cables installed in an underground duct bank. They will be installed using techniques like horizontal directional drilling (HDD) to minimize impacts on roadways, wetlands, and waterbodies. For Project 1, the Atlantic Landfall Site in Atlantic City, New Jersey would be connected to the 12.4-22.6 mi (20-36.4 km) Cardiff Onshore Interconnection Cable Route that would continue to the Cardiff Substation/Converter Station. It would end at the Cardiff Substation POI. For Project 2, the Monmouth Landfall Site in Sea Girt, New Jersey would be connected to the 9.8-23 mi (25.8-37 km) Larrabee Onshore Interconnection Cable Route that would continue to the Larrabee Substation/Converter Station. It would end at the Larrabee Substation POI. There is also a new Operations and Management Facility proposed in Atlantic City.

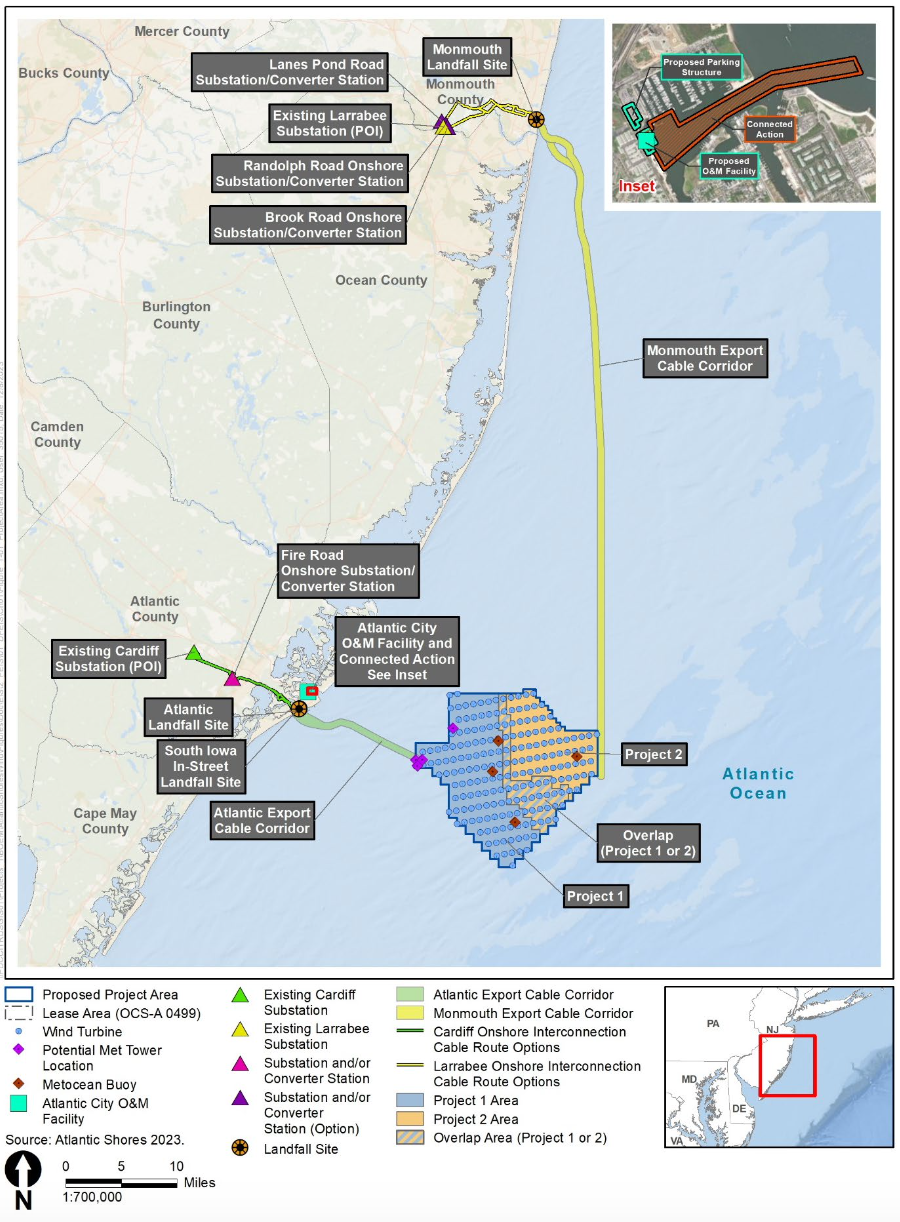
Map of Interconnections for Atlantic Shores South

==== Point of interconnection ====
To accommodate the maximum amount of energy that could be generated by both Project 1 and Project 2, Atlantic Shores South will require two points of interconnection (POI). Atlantic Shores identified five potential POIs based on their proximity to the coastline, environmental and technical attributes (such as substation voltage), potential for expansion, and upgrades needed to accommodate the project’s interconnection. The onshore interconnection cables will continue from the proposed landfall locations to the POIs. The POIs have existing substations where the project’s onshore interconnection cables will connect to the electrical grid. Both Project 1 and Project 2 will have five offshore substations (10 total). Each will have one onshore substation (if HVAC export cables are used) or a converter station (if HVDC export cables are used). These facilities will step up or step down the transmission voltage for grid interconnection. The chosen POIs provide suitable landfall sites and shorter, more direct routes that utilize existing linear infrastructure. The routes also avoid or minimize impacts to residential and natural areas compared to other alternatives.

Project 1 will connect to the Cardiff POI located in Egg Harbor Township, New Jersey. The Cardiff POI has a nameplate capacity of 1,510 MW. To accommodate this project, the Cardiff POI will require upgrades, which will be contained on Atlantic City Electric’s (ACE) property. The upgrades will include a new 230 kV gas insulated switchgear equipment and new transmission cables to connect existing equipment to the new gas insulated switchgear equipment, as well as to the project’s onshore cable route. To get this POI approved, Atlantic shores executed an Interconnection Service Agreement (ISA) and Interconnection Service Construction Agreement (ISCA) with ACE and PJM Interconnection. PJM, standing for Pennsylvania-New Jersey-Maryland, is a Regional Transmission Organization (RTO) that oversees the safety, reliability, and security of the bulk power transmission system across 13 states and the District of Columbia. It coordinates electricity movement, manages wholesale electricity markets, and ensures grid reliability while facilitating equitable access to the market participants.

Project 2 will connect to the Larrabee POI located in Howell, New Jersey. The Larrabee POI has a nameplate capacity of 1,327 MW. The infrastructure development at this site may involve contributions from the New Jersey Board of Public Utilities (BPU), adapting existing facilities to meet the new operational demands.

==== Offshore facilities ====
The project will use 230–275 kV HVAC cables and/or 320–525 kV HVDC cables for export cables. Inter-array cables will be 66–150 kV HVAC, and inter-link cables will be 66–275 kV HVAC. Inter-array cables will be 547 mi (880 km) total, split equally between Project 1 and Project 2. Inter-link cables will be 37 mi (60 km) total (also split equally). Two Export Cable Corridors (ECCs) are planned: the Atlantic ECC and the Monmouth ECC. The Atlantic ECC runs from the western tip of the WTA to the Atlantic Landfall Site, while the Monmouth ECC runs from the eastern corner of the WTA to the Monmouth Landfall Site. The target burial depth for cables is 5 to 6.6 ft (1.5 to 2 m).

The OSSs foundations include piled, suction bucket, and gravity foundations with similar installation methods to the WTGs. OSS topsides design will include switchgear, transformers, control and communications equipment, shunt reactors, and safety equipment. The project will have up to ten small OSSs, five medium OSSs, or four large OSSs. OSSs will be positioned along the same east-northeast/west-southwest rows as the WTGs. Small OSSs will be located no closer than 12 miles (19.3 km) from the shore, while medium and large OSSs will be at least 13.5 miles (21.7 km) from shore.

== Benefits and concerns ==
=== Socioeconomic ===
==== Revenue and jobs ====
Atlantic Shores Offshore Wind estimates that Project 1 will generate approximately $1.9 billion in economic benefits for New Jersey. The project is projected to create nearly 50,000 employment opportunities, encompassing direct, indirect, and induced jobs. There will be approximately 22,290 direct full-time equivalent (FTE) positions associated with the project's development, construction, and operational phases. There will also be over 11,810 indirect FTE positions in supplier industries supporting the project and over 14,820 induced FTE positions resulting from increased local economic activity. Additionally, Atlantic Shores plans to establish an Operations and Maintenance Facility in Atlantic City, which is expected to create around 90 permanent jobs. This anticipated job growth has garnered support from community organizations, including the New Jersey Sierra Club, New Jersey League of Conservation Voters, and New Jersey Offshore Wind Alliance.

==== Fisheries and vessels ====
According to the Final Environmental Impact Statement (EIS), commercial fisheries and for-hire recreation fisheries are expected to face "major adverse effects" due to space use conflicts and gear loss. Although, some beneficial effects could be seen because of the artificial reef effect (creation of new habitats).

The Final EIS also indicates a potentially "moderate adverse" impact on navigational and vessel traffic. This is because project construction could lead to ruptures in radar signals, additional adjustments to navigation routes, and more complicated surveillance missions. In addition, nine National Marine Fisheries Service (NMFS) scientific surveys are located within the project area. Construction might disrupt the ongoing methodologies utilized to conduct research on fisheries and protected-species.

In response, Atlantic Shores South proposed several mitigation measures to address potential impacts on fisheries and vessels, including establishing a fisheries compensation and mitigation fund. Though the exact size of the fund has not been publicly disclosed, BOEM explains in the Final EIS that the amount will be determined based on annual average commercial fisheries landings values and for-hire recreational fishing revenue. The project must also maintain a fisheries gear loss claims procedure and enter into a survey mitigation agreement with NMFS to minimize impacts on scientific surveys. Further, the project will enter into a mitigation agreement with NOAA to mitigate operational impacts on oceanographic high-frequency (HF) radars, provide the maritime community with the physical locations of all cable protections installed during project construction, and comply with the Fish and Wildlife Coordination Act Conservation Recommendations. The OSSs, met tower, and WTGs will be aligned in a uniform grid with specific row spacing, and a Marine Coordinator will be employed to monitor daily vessel movements and implement communication protocols with external vessels. More actions include ensuring proper lighting, marking, and signaling of structures as navigational hazards, as well as conducting and reviewing a Navigation Safety Risk Assessment (NSRA).

=== Climate and Environment ===
==== Marine impacts ====
According to the Final EIS, Atlantic Shores South will have potential "minor to moderate effects" on air quality, as well as "moderate adverse" effects on water quality due the release of certain pollutants during the construction phase. The project will have potential "moderate adverse to moderate beneficial" effects on benthic resources. This is due to potential habitat degradation but also potential benefits from the placement of structures. "Moderate adverse" impacts on coastal habitats and fauna will potentially occur during construction.

Most of the negative attention around the project revolves around the fact that it poses potential consequences for marine mammals, including the endangered North Atlantic Right Whale (NARW). This is primarily due to possible vessel strikes and entanglement with fishing gear. However, it's important to note that scientific studies have not found a causal relationship between offshore wind projects and whale deaths. NOAA's website states, "At this point, there is no scientific evidence that noise resulting from offshore wind site characterization surveys could potentially cause whale deaths. There are no known links between large whale deaths and ongoing offshore wind activities." The Final EIS explains that the projects will have potential "moderate adverse" impacts on mysticetes, odontocetes, and pinnipeds, as well as potential "major adverse" impacts on NARWs. To mitigate these effects, Atlantic Shores Offshore Wind has proposed measures such as seasonal restrictions on pile driving, vessel speed restrictions (below 10 knots), and the implementation of passive acoustic monitoring to detect NARW presence. The EIS also notes that "minor beneficial" impacts on odontocetes and pinnipeds could potentially occur due to increased foraging opportunities. Sea turtles could face "minor adverse to minor beneficial" impacts due to pile-driving noise and the presence of structures.

==== Opposition movements ====
Voices of opposition, such as the local community organization Save Long Beach Island (Save LBI), have argued that the project poses a risk for New Jersey’s economy and marine mammals. Save LBI has publicly declared a commitment to file legal action against the projects in both the state and federal courts. In January 2025, Save LBI filed a lawsuit against the U.S. Department of Commerce, NMFS, BOEM, U.S. Department of Interior, and Atlantic Shores Offshore Wind. Concerns about the legitimacy and non-partisan views of Save LBI have risen due to their connection to the Caesar Rodney Institute (CRI), a think tank receiving funding from fossil fuel organizations like the American Fuel & Petrochemical Association. Separately, in April 2023, "Save the Whales" messages were showcased in Atlantic City via an air banner and billboard by the Committee for a Constructive Tomorrow (CFACT). The Energy and Policy Institute describes CFACT as an anti-climate change organization with funding connections to the coal industry.

Further, New Jersey Representative Jeff Van Drew (R-NJ-2) publicly called on President Donald Trump to sign an executive order ceasing offshore wind activities in early January 2025. Ten days into his presidency, President Trump announced a "Temporary Withdrawal of All Areas on the Outer Continental Shelf from Offshore Wind Leasing and Review of the Federal Government’s Leasing and Permitting Practices for Wind Projects" on January 30, 2025, signaling a hostile federal administration towards offshore wind projects.

==== Clean energy benefits ====
Atlantic Shores South is designed to generate up to 2,800 megawatts (MW) of electricity, sufficient to power approximately one million homes each year with clean energy. This initiative aligns with New Jersey's objective to achieve 100% clean energy by 2035. By providing a substantial source of zero-carbon renewable energy, the project aims to reduce reliance on fossil fuels, thereby decreasing greenhouse gas emissions and enhancing air quality. Offshore wind energy is a pivotal element of New Jersey's strategy to transition to sustainable energy sources and combat climate change.

=== Scenic and visual resources ===
==== Historic sites ====
Atlantic Shores South raises specific cultural heritage concerns related to historic sites. A Section 106 review, conducted under the National Historic Preservation Act (NHPA), identified potential adverse effects on 29 above ground historic properties. To address these concerns, a Section 106 Memorandum of Agreement (MOA) was executed on June 27, 2024, stipulating how the adverse effects on these historic properties would be resolved. Mitigation measures include implementation of protective buffers to avoid marine archaeological resources, completion of construction monitoring to avoid terrestrial archaeological resources, implementation of measures in historic property treatment plans (HPTPs) for resolving adverse effects on ancient submerged landform features (ASLF) and aboveground historic properties, contributions to a mitigation fund for resolving adverse effects on aboveground historic properties, and implementation of actions that are consistent with the Post Review Discovery Plans for marine and terrestrial archaeology.

Some of the historical properties affected include the Atlantic City Convention Hall (Jim Whelan Boardwalk Hall), Lucy the Margate Elephant, Barnegat Lighthouse, Forked River Coast Guard Station No. 112, Island Beach State Park Historic District, Absecon Lighthouse, Atlantic City Boardwalk Historic District, Great Egg Coast Guard Station, Missouri Avenue Beach (Chicken Bone Beach), and Saint Leonard’s Tract Historic District. Further, eight shore towns—Beach Haven, Barnegat Light, Brigantine, Harvey Cedars, Long Beach Township, Ship Bottom, Surf City, and Ventnor— have appealed the New Jersey Department of Environmental Protection’s (DEP) federal consistency certification related to the Atlantic Shores South proposal to construct wind turbines near Long Beach Island. In their brief, the municipalities argue that the certification was issued arbitrarily and unreasonably, request a reconsideration due to alleged bias linked to political pressures, and seek an adjudicative hearing on the matter after their previous request was denied.

==== Tribal Nation consultation ====
Lease OSC-A 0499 is on the tribal lands of the Narragansett Indian Tribe, the Shinnecock Indian Nation, and the Lenape Tribe of Delaware. As required under Section 106 of the National Historic Preservation Act (NHPA), Atlantic Shores consulted with these tribes to address potential adverse effects on sites that may be historically or culturally significant. These consultations helped identify the 29 historic properties described above.

BOEM held government-to-government and Tribal consultation meetings on the Atlantic Shores South Notice of Intent (NOI) on November 15, 2021, and the draft EIS on June 27, 2023. The Delaware Tribe of Indians and The Shinnecock Indian Nation participated in the government-to-government meeting on November 15, 2021. The Stockbridge-Munsee Community Band of Mohican Indians, Mashantucket (Western) Pequot Tribal Nation, and Wampanoag Tribe of Gay Head (Aquinnah) participated in the Tribal consultation meeting on June 27, 2023. BOEM leaders also met with the Houlton Band of Maliseet Indians, as well as the Mashantucket, Mashpee, Narragansett, Passamaquoddy, Penobscot, Shinnecock, and Aquinnah Tribes at the Tribal Leaders Summit on April 10, 2023.

== Status and future outlook ==
As of October 2024, Atlantic Shores South Project 1 was intended to be New Jersey's first offshore wind farm. In January 2025, Shell withdrew from the project, taking an almost $1 billion write-off. That same month, President Donald Trump signed an executive order halting new permit approvals for offshore wind projects and called for a review of previously accepted proposals, signaling a hostile federal environment toward the offshore wind industry. In February 2025, the New Jersey Board of Public Utilities (BPU) decided not to approve any new offshore wind projects during its Fourth Solicitation window, including Atlantic Shores Offshore Wind's revised proposal from July 2024. Following this decision, Atlantic Shores Offshore Wind issued a press release, stating that the BPU’s rejection puts New Jersey's goal of achieving 100% clean energy by 2035 "at risk."

After Shell’s exit, its former joint venture partner, EDF Renewables, assumed full control of the project but recorded a €934 million (approximately $980 million) write-down related to the withdrawal. Despite this financial setback, EDF Renewables has expressed its commitment to advancing Atlantic Shores South, aiming to contribute to New Jersey's clean energy goals. However, with the BPU canceling the Fourth Solicitation and federal uncertainty surrounding offshore wind, the project's future remains unclear. If cancelled, it would mark the second major offshore wind project failure in New Jersey, following Ørsted's cancellation of Ocean Wind 1 and Ocean Wind 2 in October 2023 due to supply chain issues.

== See also ==
- Offshore wind power in the United States
- Offshore wind power
- Energy Policy Act of 2005
- Bureau of Ocean Energy Management
- New Jersey Board of Public Utilities
- Inflation Reduction Act of 2022
- Environmental impact of wind power
- Energy policy of the United States
- EDF Renewables
