= Garden State Film Festival =

Annual film festival in Asbury Park, New Jersey

Coordinates: 40.223748°N 73.999011°W

- Location: Asbury Park and Cranford, New Jersey, U.S.
- Founded: 2002
- Founded by: Robert Pastorelli, Diane Raver
- Language: International
- Website: www.gsff.org

The Garden State Film Festival is an annual film festival in the United States held in Asbury Park and Cranford, New Jersey, showcasing more than 200 independent films over four days each spring.

The festival was founded in 2002 in Sea Girt, New Jersey by Diane Raver and Hollywood actor Robert Pastorelli. Pastorelli and Raver mounted the first festival in 2003. As of 2017, the executive director is Lauren Concar Sheehy.

The festival pays tribute to Jersey's legacy as the birthplace of American filmmaking in Thomas Edison's Menlo Park laboratories, and to Fort Lee, home to America's first motion picture industry. Participants frequently include a New Jersey tie. The festival is one of Asbury Park's major cultural and economic forces.

In 2021, the festival began including screenings at the century-old Cranford movie theater in Cranford, New Jersey.

The festival's 24th annual edition was held March 26–29, 2026, featuring 205 films and film-centered events.

== See also ==
- Television and film in New Jersey
- List of film festivals in New Jersey
- New Jersey Motion Picture and Television Commission
