= Cranford Theater =

1926 movie theater in New Jersey, US

The Cranford Theater
- Interactive map of The Cranford Theater
- Former names: Cranford Theatre, New Branford Theatre, Stern's New Cranford
- Address: 25 North Avenue West, Cranford, NJ 07016
- Coordinates: 40°39′20″N 74°18′22″W
- Type: Movie theater, small live performing-arts stage added to front of screening room in 2020s
- Screen: 5
- Public transit: Cranford station

Construction
- Opened: 1926
- Renovated: 2019

Website
- cranfordtheater.com

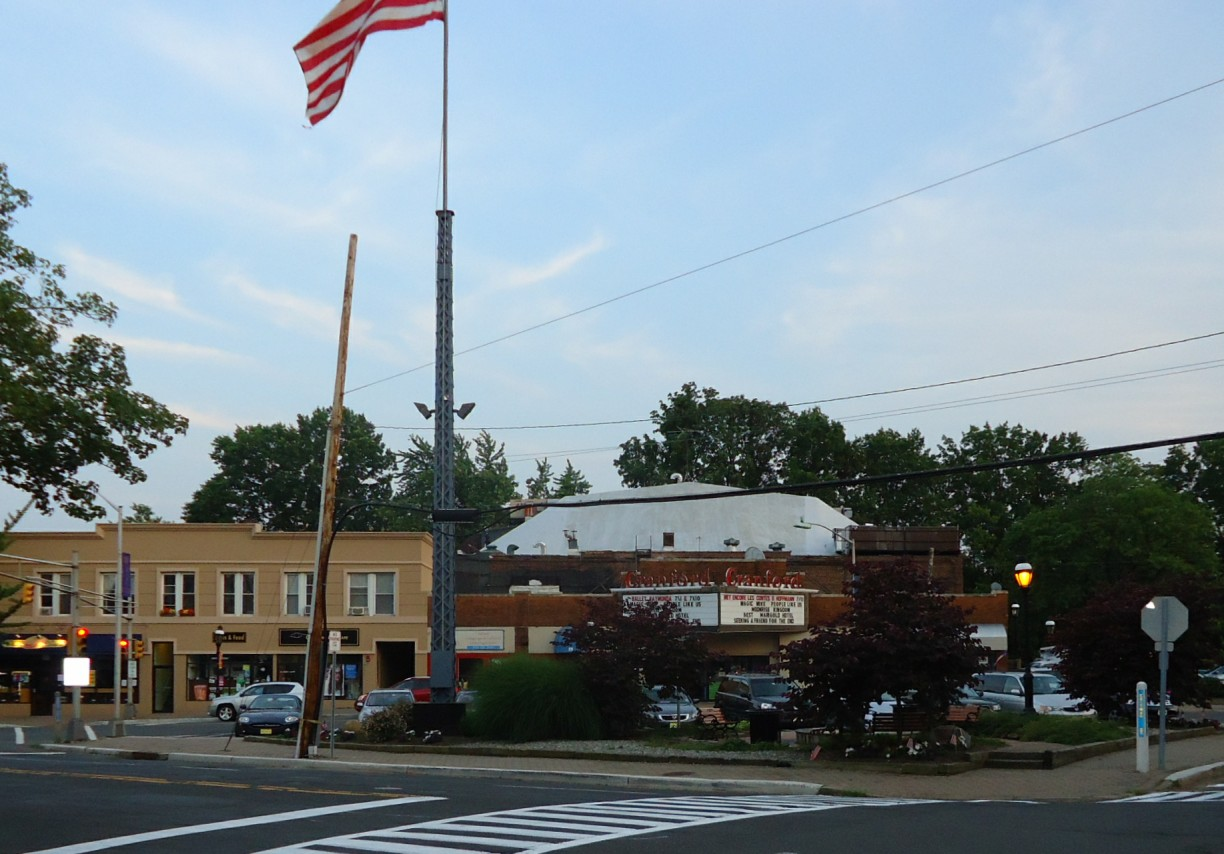
The Cranford Theater in Cranford, New Jersey

The Cranford Theater is an independently owned movie theater in Cranford, New Jersey, United States that has been in operation since 1926.

== History ==
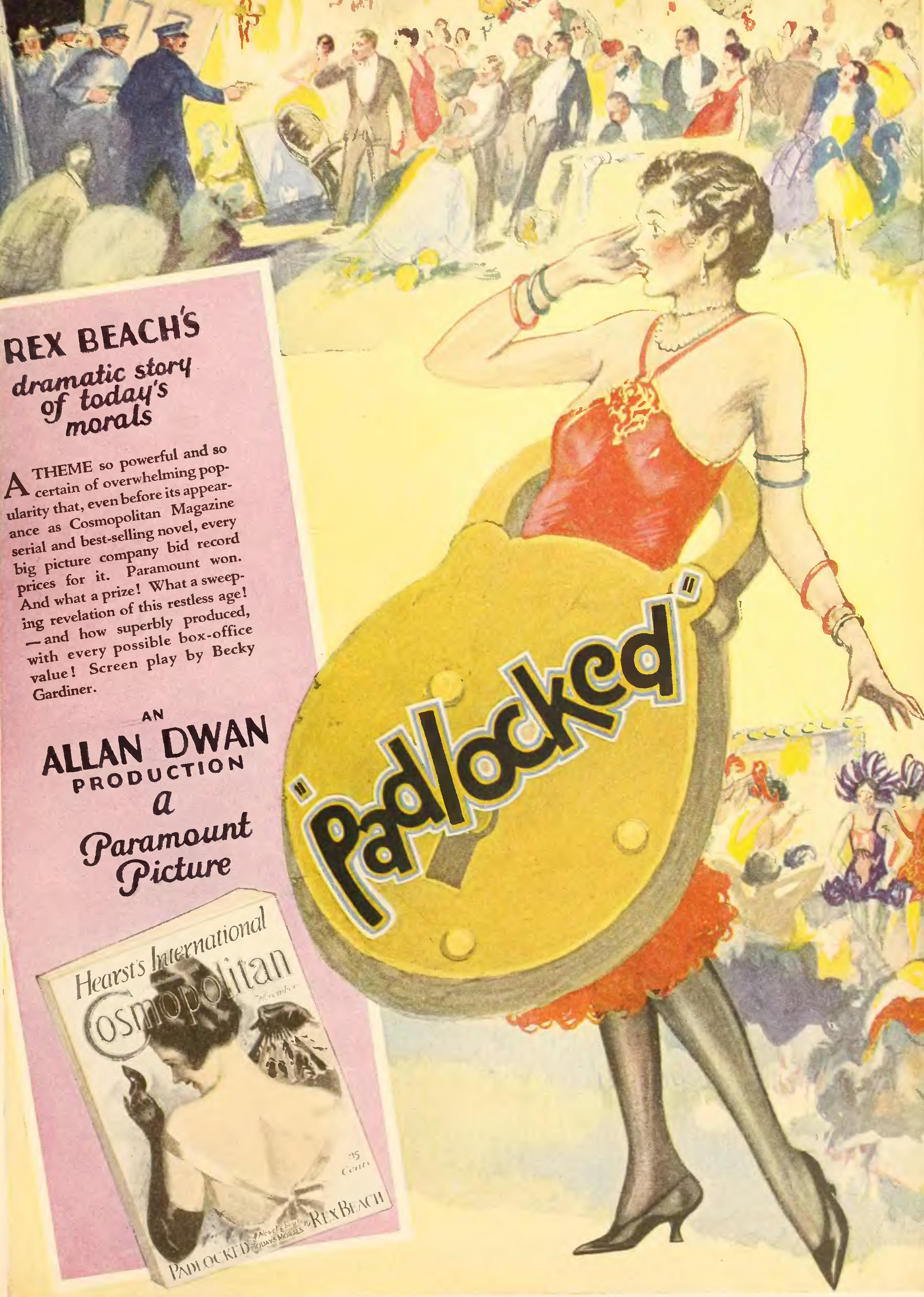
Padlocked was the first film shown at the theater. Advertisement in Motion Picture News, 1926

The Cranford Theater first opened in 1926. With a seating capacity of 1,300, the theater was equipped with an $18,000 Wurlitzer pipe organ with two manual and eight ranks. The inaugural screening featured the silent movie Padlocked starring Noah Beery, Louise Dresser, and Douglas Fairbanks Jr.

Initially facing some naming-conflict issues, the theater opened as the New Branford Theatre, but the matter was resolved at the beginning of 1927. The signage was updated, replacing the "B"s with "C"s, and on January 27, 1927, the theater became known as the New Cranford Theatre.

Throughout its history, the ownership of the Cranford Theater has changed hands. During the 1980s and 1990s, it was under the ownership of Cineplex Odeon and had two screens. Later, in 1998, the theater was purchased by the owner of the Rialto Theater in the neighboring town of Westfield and was converted into a five-screen cinema. After additional changes of ownership, it reopened as the Cranford Theater after renovations in 2019.

In April 2025, a suspended internal ceiling inside one of the screening rooms partially collapsed, but the structure and roof remained intact contrary to initial reports of a roof collapse.

The theater was renovated and reopened in late 2025, expanded to show additional live material such as comedy shows, live music, readings, and other content.

== Events and festivals ==
The theater is home to the Cranford Film Festival and Garden State Film Festival. It offers screenings for other New Jersey film festivals. The theater added a small live performing arts stage to the venue in the early 2020s.

== See also ==
The Riverside Inn
