= Missouri Avenue Beach =

Beach in Atlantic City, New Jersey, US

Coordinates: 39.3541°N 74.4362°W

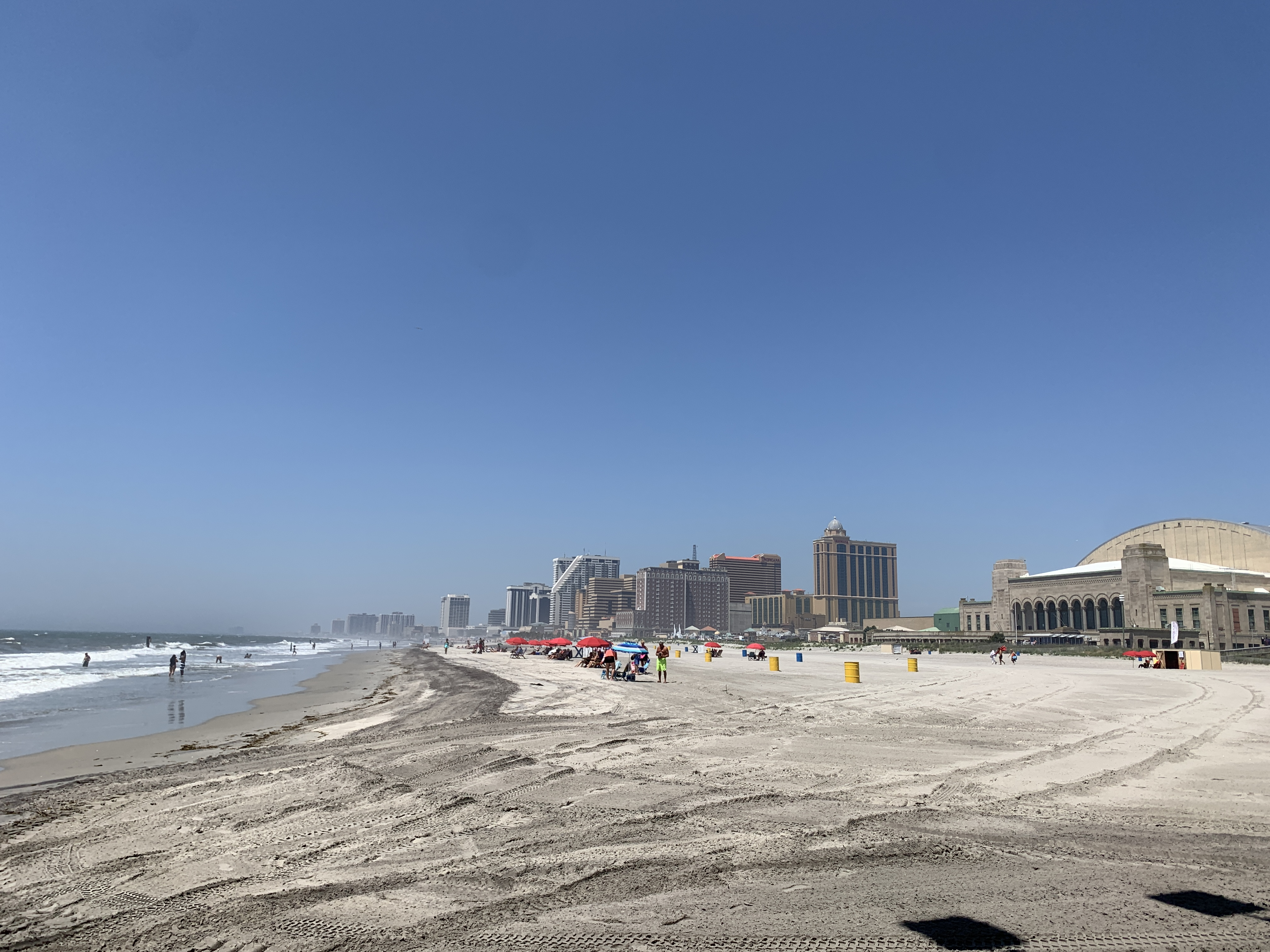
Missouri Avenue Beach, also known as Chicken Bone Beach

Missouri Avenue Beach, often referred to as "Chicken Bone Beach," is a lifeguarded beach on the Jersey Shore. It was an early and mid-twentieth-century Black resort destination and racially segregated section of the Atlantic Ocean beach near the Northside neighborhood of Atlantic City, New Jersey (between Missouri and Mississippi Avenues). The name was initially most likely a pejorative or condescending reference to the packed lunches brought by beachgoers who were not permitted by unspoken sentiment in many dining establishments, but the Black community has reclaimed the name as a point of resistance and pride. The beach is now home to swimming, sunbathing, jazz and other local events.

== History ==
Blacks and whites lived in the area side by side with few problems after the American Civil War. It was not until 1900 that the beach became segregated, due in part to pressures by local businesses. It remained a blacks only beach until the passing of the Civil Rights Act of 1964. During segregation and the Jim Crow era other area beaches did not allow African American visitors. It was given its colloquial name by locals due to the chicken bones presumably found in this segregated area during regular clean ups, although by all accounts the reports were simply unfounded. While there were no signs nor laws prohibiting blacks from enjoying the entirety of the beach, the segregation was rigidly enforced by local authorities or more commonly, white beachgoers. The Atlantic City Beach Patrol was officially desegregated, but its black members were in practice consigned to Missouri Avenue Beach. Desegregation came in the 1960s.

Black showgirls at Club Harlem were said to have called the beach "Sunshine Row" during midcentury, when stars like Sammy Davis Jr., Louis Jordan, the Mills Brothers, and Jackie “Moms” Mabley performed in the city.

Martin Luther King Jr. was photographed on a family vacation to the beach in 1956.

== Chicken Bone Beach Historical Foundation ==
The Chicken Bone Beach Historical Foundation, founded by Atlantic City native Henrietta W. Shelton, installed a commemorative marker to mark Chicken Bone Beach in 2015.

== Chicken Bone Beach Jazz ==
The Chicken Bone Beach Historical Foundation offers weekly Chicken Bone Beach Jazz concerts. In the summer, they are held next to the beach, at the Kennedy Plaza outdoor amphitheater. In the cooler months, Chicken Bone Beach Jazz plays at the Claridge Hotel.

Chicken Bone Beach Youth Jazz Institute offers free music lessons.

== See also ==
- The African American Heritage Museum of Southern New Jersey in Atlantic City at Noyes Arts Garage (one of two locations for its collection and art exhibitions).
- Nightclubs in Atlantic City
- Stockton University's Atlantic City campus
- Historical Kentucky Avenue Renaissance Festival, annual festival celebrating Atlantic City's Black music and entertainment district.
- Oak Bluffs, Massachusetts, African-American resort area on Martha's Vineyard with the similarly reclaimed, formerly pejorative name of "The Inkwell" for the local beach.
- James Moody Jazz Festival, annual New Jersey jazz festival in Newark.
- North to Shore Festival, annual arts and ideas festival held at the beach and other locations in Atlantic City, Newark, and Asbury Park.
- The Black Excellence Festival, also known as the BE Festival, held annually Juneteenth weekend in Atlantic City.
- Chris Columbo, jazz drummer and Atlantic City entertainer.
- Exit Zero Jazz Festival in Cape May, New Jersey
- Springwood Avenue, African-American historical music district in Asbury Park, New Jersey
- Black history in Atlantic City, New Jersey
