= Barrymore Film Center =

Film museum and theater in New Jersey

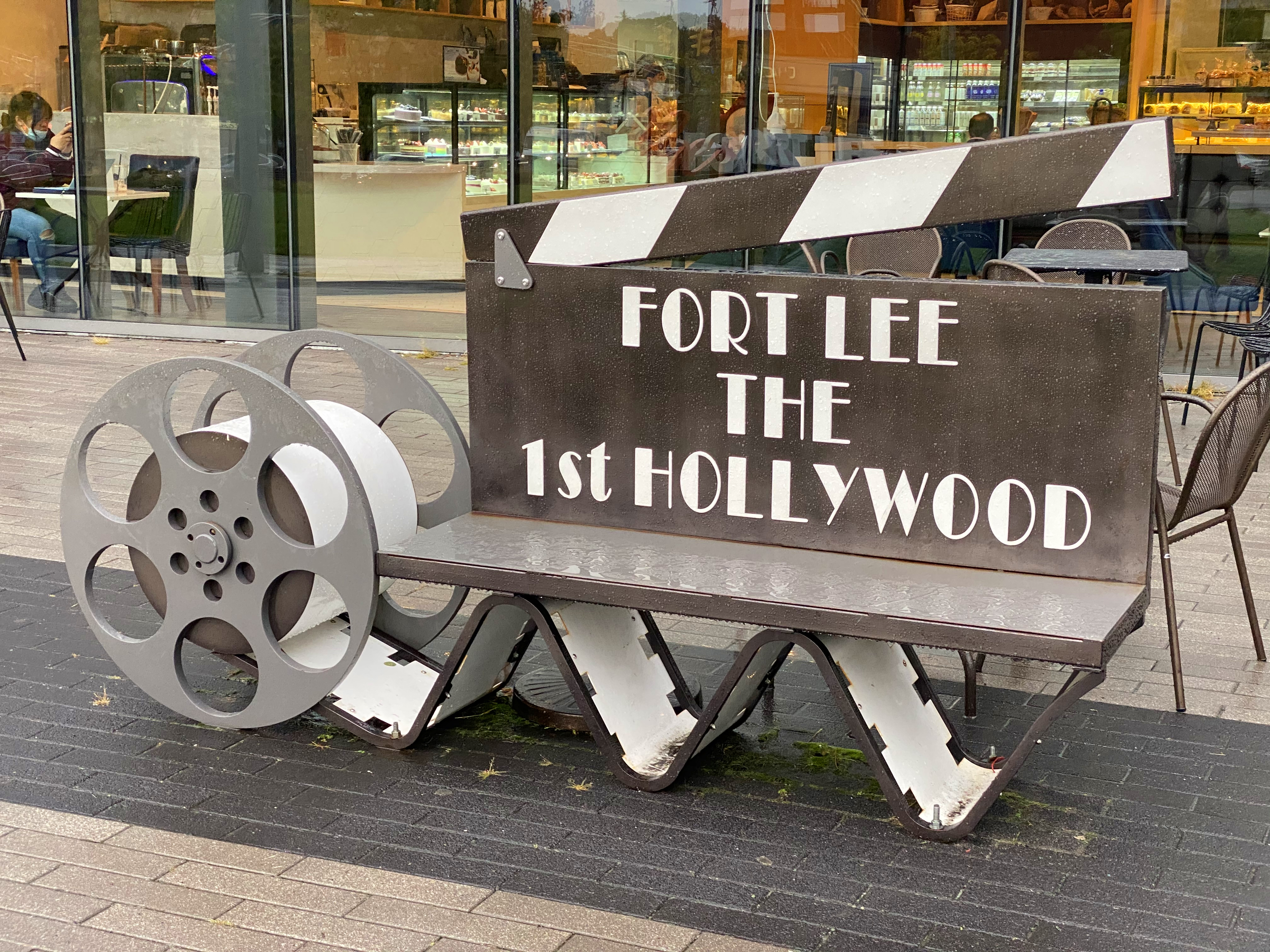
- Established: October 2022
- Location: Fort Lee, New Jersey, U.S.
- Coordinates: 40°51′04″N 73°58′04″W
- Public transit access: GWB Plaza
- Website: www.barrymorefilmcenter.org

The Barrymore Film Center is a publicly owned, non-profit film history museum and archive, with a 260-seat cinema and repertory theater, in Fort Lee, New Jersey. The BFC is dedicated to the role of the town as the birthplace of American cinema. It is named for the Barrymore family, members of whom lived in and worked in the borough.

== Location and design ==
The newly built center was designed by Hugh Hardy and cost $15–$16 million to build. It opened in October 2022 near George Washington Bridge Plaza on Palisade Avenue as part of a major development project that also includes the Modern high-rise complex.

== Background ==
=== Birthplace of American cinema ===
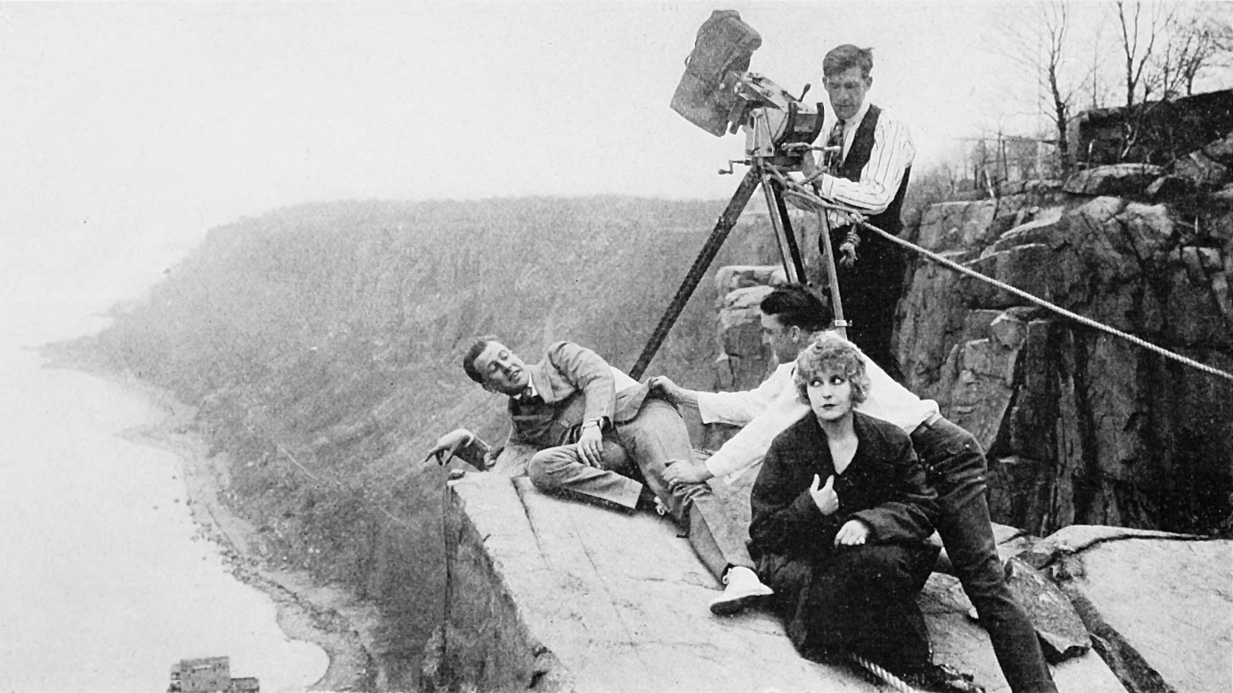
The "cliffhanger" film trope was popularized with the use of the cliffs of the Palisades overlooking the Hudson River as a 'perilous' filming location, as seen above in The House of Hate (1918). (Note: Film star Pearl White sitting with cinematographer Arthur C. Miller at the camera; director George B. Seitz leans near the edge of the cliff, gripped by actor Antonio Moreno)

Fort Lee is home to America's first motion picture industry. A large number of early films, many silent, were shot at studios and on location in and around the town. With the first constructed in 1909, there were 11 major studios in Fort Lee by 1918. That year a number of factors affected film production: the "Spanish flu" influenza pandemic, a World War I coal shortage and rationing, and a record-breaking cold winter. The Hudson River froze and service on the 125th Street ferry to Manhattan was curtailed. Activity at the studios was suspended and most operations shifted to California. Much of it did not return, but the presence of facilities saw continued shooting and created opportunities for independent filmmakers into the 1920s and 1930s.

=== The Barrymores ===
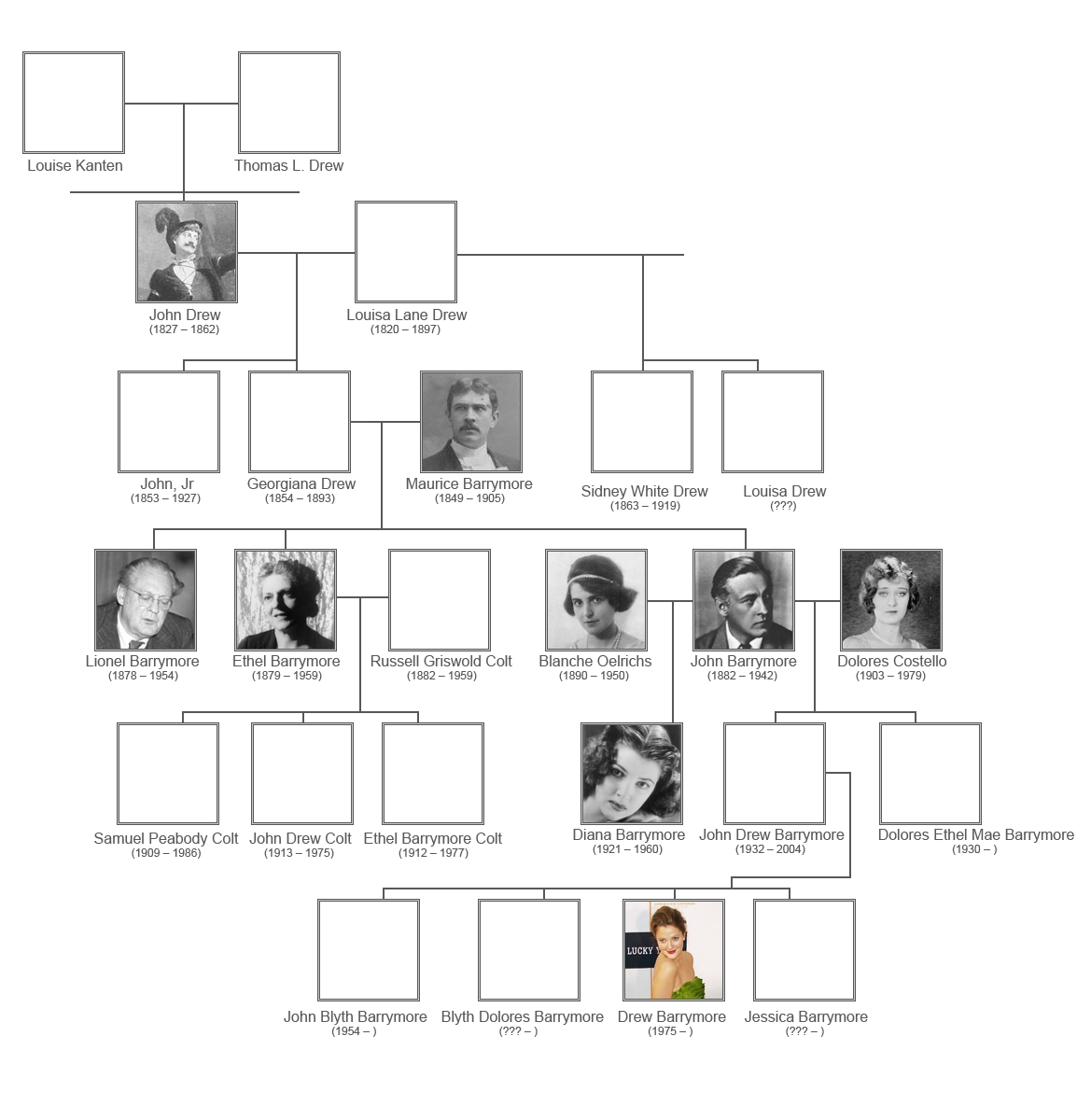
The Barrymores were a prominent family in Fort Lee. The inaugural exhibition at the BFC was called The Barrymores: The Royal Family of Fort Lee

The center is named for the Barrymore family, the British-American acting dynasty. Maurice Barrymore lived in the Coytesville section of Fort Lee from 1890 until his death in 1905. The actor volunteered as a firefighter for the local fire department, and helped to fund a firehouse and obtain uniforms for its members. His son, John Barrymore, one of the most famous and well-regarded actors of his generation, made his acting debut at age 18 in a short play, Man of the World, directed by Maurice in 1900 in a fundraiser for the firehouse. He, along with Maurice's other two children, Lionel and Ethel, also worked as actors in Fort Lee's motion picture industry.

=== Fort Lee Film Commission ===
The Fort Lee Film Commission (FLFC) was established in 2000. Prior to the opening of the BFC, it worked with the Fort Lee Museum and the city's Office of Film and Heritage & Cultural Affairs to maintain film archives and memorabilia, place historical markers, and present exhibitions, events, and film screenings. It has been making attempts to find and save film-era landmarks. In 2006, Arcadia Publishing published the book Fort Lee Birthplace of the Motion Picture Industry compiled by the commission. The Barrymore Film Center is the culmination of efforts to draw attention to Fort Lee's film history as well as to promote world film and filmmaking.

== Programming ==
=== Exhibitions ===
The museum presents exhibitions under guidance of its curator, film historian Richard Koszarski. In homage, the inaugural exhibition at the BFC was called The Barrymores: The Royal Family of Fort Lee. The second was Power Couple; Mary Pickford and Douglas Fairbanks in Hollywood.

=== Film festival and screenings ===
The Barrymore Film Center is home to the annual BFC Short Film Festival. In 2023, it was a partner venue for screenings at the New York Asian Film Festival.

== See also ==
- Television and film in New Jersey
- List of film festivals in New Jersey
- New Jersey Motion Picture and Television Commission
