= Fort Lee Museum =

Historical museum in Fort Lee, New Jersey

Coordinates: 40°50′54.24″N 73°58′7.70″W

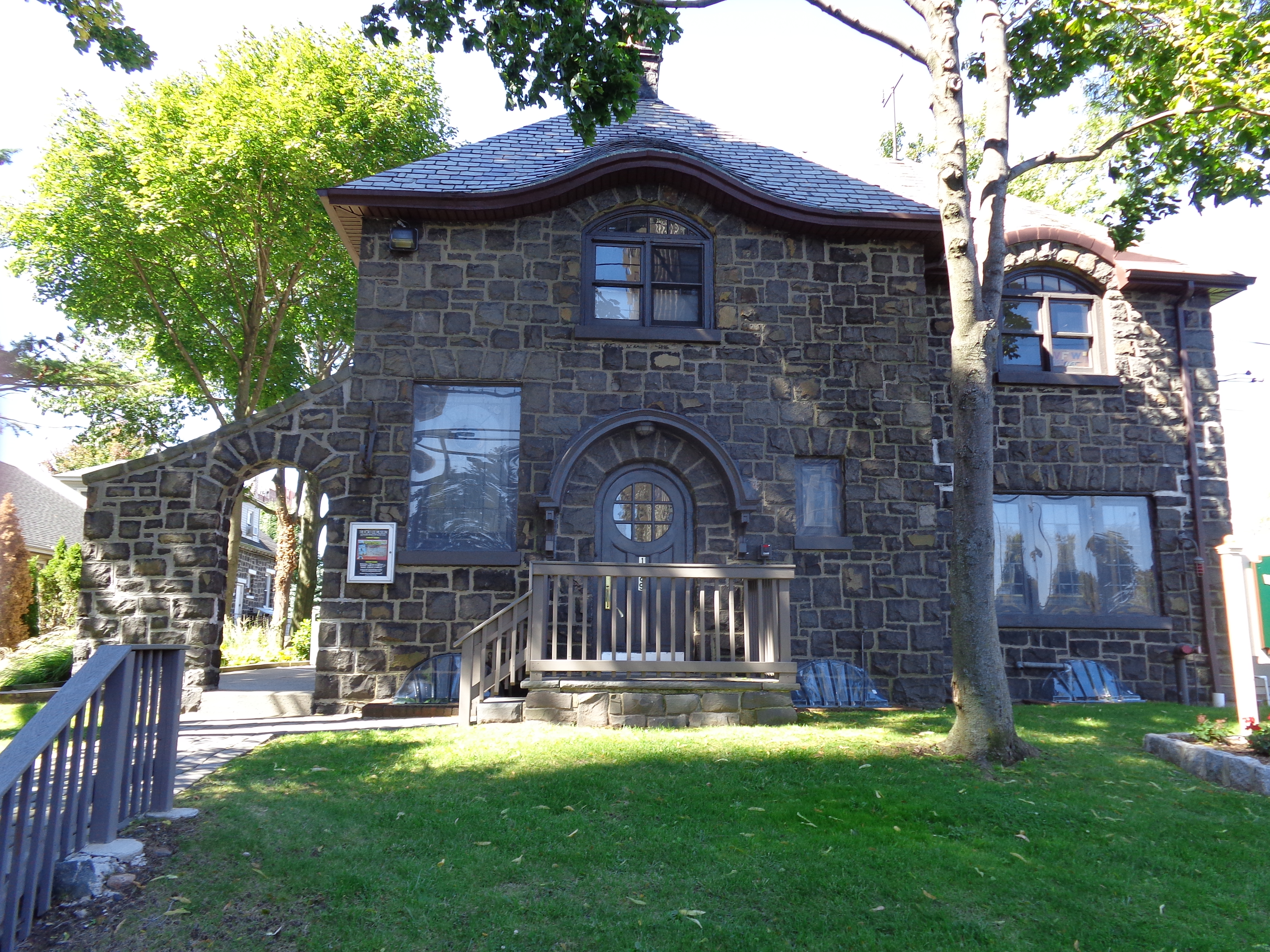
Fort Lee Museum

The Fort Lee Museum is a historical museum in Fort Lee, New Jersey on Palisade Avenue within Monument Park. The museum opened in April 1999 and is operated by the Fort Lee Historical Society. The museum closed during the 2020-2022 Covid-pandemic and has not re-opened.

== Building ==
The museum building is also known as the Judge Moore House. It was built in 1922 with an exterior of bluestone quarried from the Hudson Palisades atop which Fort Lee is situated. The building was slated for demolition in 1989 but community intervention prevented its destruction and the borough purchased it.

== Exhibitions ==
The museum has collections which speak the long history of Fort Lee and surrounding communities such as the Battle of Fort Lee, America's first motion picture industry, the George Washington Bridge and Palisades Amusement Park.

== Monument Park ==
Monument Park was built by the Daughters of the American Revolution and dedicated in 1908 at ceremony attended by General John "Black Jack" Pershing. The park was part of the original Fort Constitution of the Continental Army under the leadership of General George Washington. Over 2,600 troops were stationed in and around the Monument Park area. In 2004, the park was reconstructed for the Fort Lee Centennial Celebration. A time capsule was placed at the foot of the monument, to be opened at the Bicentennial Celebration in the year 2104. Monument Park and Continental Army Plaza in Williamsburg, Brooklyn are the only parks in the United States dedicated to the soldiers of the American Revolution. The Historic Preservation Committee is considering creating a historic district of Monument Park.

== Shakespeare Festival ==
The Hudson Shakespeare Company have presented a Shakespeare in the Park festival adjacent to museum since 2007 in association with the Fort Lee Film Commission.

== See also ==
- Fort Lee Historic Park
- Barrymore Film Center
