= Crossroads (venue) =

Live performance club in Garwood, New Jersey

- Interactive map of Crossroads
- Address: 78 North Avenue, Garwood, New Jersey 07027
- Location: Central Union County, New Jersey, about eight miles west of Newark Liberty International Airport
- Coordinates: 40.6544°N 74.3185°W
- Owner: Lee Frankel
- Capacity: 250
- Type: Music venue, comedy club
- Event: various

Construction
- Opened: 1996

Website
- https://www.xxroads.com/

Crossroads is an independent bar, restaurant, and music club in central Union County, New Jersey.

== Background ==
The club opened in 1996 playing blues, jazz and rock music. A variety of music and comedy genres appear at present.

== Awards ==
In 2023, Crossroads was one of four finalists for "Best Venue of the US Northeast" in the "Hometowns of Consequence" awards by music publication Consequence.

== See also ==
- WSOU
- The Aquarian Weekly
- Union County Performing Arts Center
- New Jersey music venues by capacity
- The Riverside Inn
