= Princeton Garden Theatre =

Movie theater in Princeton, New Jersey

- "The Garden", "The Pit" (formerly)
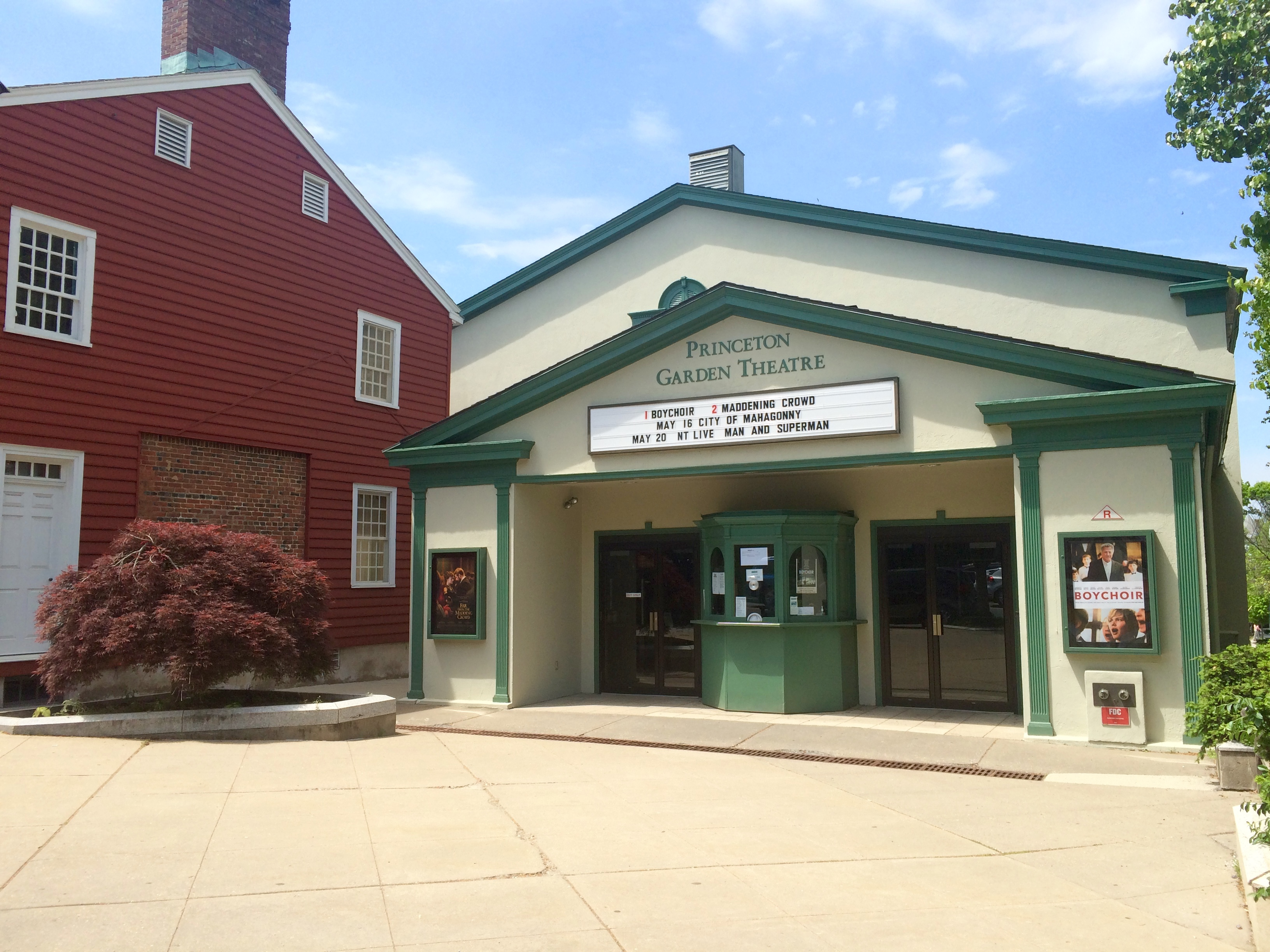
- The Garden Theater, with Bainbridge House on the left
- Interactive map of Princeton Garden Theatre
- Former names: Eric Garden Theater (1975-1997)
- Address: 160 Nassau St., Princeton, NJ 08542
- Coordinates: 40.350685°N 74.657581°W
- Owner: Princeton University
- Operator: Renew Theaters
- Seating type: Stadium seating
- Capacity: 1000 (original), 380 (current)
- Type: Movie theater
- Screen: 2
- Public transit: Coach line 100, Princeton Dinky

Construction
- Opened: 20 September 1920
- Renovated: 2001
- Closed: 1992-93
- Cost: $60,000 (1920)
- Builder: Mathews Construction Co. of Princeton

Website
- princetongardentheatre.org

The Princeton Garden Theatre is a historic movie theater on Nassau Street in Princeton, New Jersey. Owned by Princeton University, it is operated by Renew Theaters, a non-profit which manages golden-age movie theaters. The theater shows first run movies of high artistic quality as well as classic and foreign language films, and Saturday kids' matinees. The Garden live broadcasts performances from the Royal National Theatre and host talks and lectures from filmmakers including Terrence Malick and Peter Saraf. In March 2017 the Garden was named New Jersey's best movie theater by NJ.com. It offers screenings for a number of area film festivals.

In addition to walk-up ticket sales and concessions, the Garden Theatre relies on a core of members in order to meet its operating costs. Garden Theatre Members subscribe once per year with tax-deductible donations of various amounts and receive discounted admissions for all screenings.

The Garden Theatre runs classic films all summer as part of its Hollywood Summer Nights series.

== History ==
=== Early plans ===
The original impetus for the Garden Theatre came from a desire to improve the quality of performing spaces in the town. As early as 1909, a proposal was made to build a new home for the Princeton Triangle Club which performed in a structure on campus called the Casino considered to have poor acoustics. Alexander Hall was thought to have an awkward stage and to be too large for smaller gatherings. In 1914, Professor Donald Clive Stuart, an advocate of the Little Theatre Movement, proposed a new facility similar in size to the Princess Theatre in New York which would also be suitable for motion pictures drawn from the Rialto Theatre.

=== Construction ===
A more concrete plan took form in 1919 with the creation of the Princeton Theater Company. The company secured the site at the corner of Nassau Street and Vandeventer Avenue adjacent to and behind Bainbridge House, a historic structure that had served as the British headquarters during the Revolutionary War Battle of Princeton. The theater took its name from the rose garden that once stood beside the house. The original plans, while expecting that moving pictures would be the chief attraction, called for the construction of a sizable stage to allow for live theater. With the remaining live theater spaces in Trenton being converted to movie theaters it was expected that the Garden would provide a space for openings of shows by New York theater companies. As construction progressed it was decided to drop plans for a stage, while allowing for the possibility that one would be added in future, and restrict the Garden to cinema and the occasional lecture. As completed in 1920 the theater cost $60,000, including the organ, and had 1000 seats, 780 in the orchestra and 220 in the gallery which also had a number of boxes. With the garden strictly a movie theater, the desire for a new space for live performances in Princeton was ultimately fulfilled with the opening of McCarter Theatre in 1930. While it is sometimes claimed that the Garden was initially home to the Princeton Triangle Club that was only a proposed use during early planning and never came to pass.

=== Early decades ===
Thomas Meighan, star of Civilian Clothes, the first movie to play at the Garden

The Garden opened on September 20, 1920, with a showing of Civilian Clothes, a silent comedy starring Thomas Meighan. The movie was accompanied by a live orchestra and palms and ferns were arranged on the stage.
