= Smodcastle Film Festival =

Film festival in New Jersey

SModcastle Film Festival
- Status: Active
- Genre: Film festival
- Frequency: Annually
- Venue: SModcastle Cinemas
- Locations: Atlantic Highlands, New Jersey
- Country: United States
- Years active: 2022–present
- Founder: Kevin Smith
- Website: smodcastlefilmfestival.com

Smodcastle Film Festival, stylized as SModcastle Film Festival, is an annual independent film festival held at Smodcastle Cinemas in Atlantic Highlands, New Jersey. The festival was announced in 2022 by filmmaker Kevin Smith and has screened feature films, short films, documentaries, animation, and other independent films. Its programming has included filmmaker events, panel discussions, and awards ceremonies.

== History ==
The festival was announced in March 2022, when Yahoo Entertainment reported that Kevin Smith planned to launch a New Jersey-based SModcastle Film Festival. The inaugural festival was held at SModcastle Cinemas in Atlantic Highlands, New Jersey.

The opening night feature of the inaugural festival was the world premiere of Shelter in Solitude, written by and starring Rumson, New Jersey filmmaker Siobhan Fallon Hogan. The Two River Times later reported that the film made its festival world premiere on November 30, 2022, at Kevin Smith's inaugural SModcastle Film Festival, held at SModcastle Cinemas in Atlantic Highlands.

By 2024, the festival had reached its third annual edition. In November 2024, Deadline Hollywood reported that Alejandro Montoya Marin's comedy film The Unexpecteds won Best Comedy at the third annual SModcastle Film Festival. Deadline later noted the film's SModcastle award when reporting that Kevin Smith joined the film as an executive producer.

In 2024, The Hollywood Reporter reported that Tommy Avallone's documentary The House From... would premiere at Kevin Smith's SModcastle Film Festival in New Jersey.

In 2025, SModcastle Cinemas described the event as the fourth annual SModcastle Film Festival.

== Programming ==
The festival screens feature films, short films, animation, documentaries, and other independent work. According to SModcastle Cinemas, selected entries are screened at SModcastle Cinemas, and the festival includes filmmaker meet-and-greet events, panels, and an awards ceremony.

The 2025 festival schedule listed a Kevin Smith film panel, an MVD panel discussion, and an awards ceremony and afterparty.

== Notable screenings and awards ==
Shelter in Solitude had its festival world premiere as the opening night feature of the inaugural SModcastle Film Festival in 2022.

In 2024, The House From..., a documentary directed by Tommy Avallone, premiered at the festival.

Also in 2024, The Unexpecteds, written and directed by Alejandro Montoya Marin and starring Matt Walsh, won Best Comedy at the third annual SModcastle Film Festival.

== Industry activity ==
In a 2023 article for No Film School, filmmaker Christopher Studenka wrote about screening his feature film Run Rabbit at SModcastle Film Festival. Studenka described the event as including filmmakers from multiple locations, panel discussions, and a distributor panel led by Kevin Smith.

== See also ==
- Kevin Smith
- Atlantic Highlands, New Jersey
- List of film festivals in New Jersey
- Film festival
- Television and film in New Jersey
- North to Shore Festival
- List of festivals in New Jersey
- New Jersey Motion Picture & Television Commission
- Rutgers Filmmaking Center
- Netflix Studios Fort Monmouth
