= Exit Zero Jazz Festival =

Biannual music festival held in Cape May, New Jersey

- Genre: Jazz
- Dates: Twice annually (spring and fall)
- Location: Cape May, New Jersey
- Years active: 2012–present
- Founders: Michael Kline
- Website: exitzerojazzfestival.com

The Exit Zero Jazz Festival is a semiannual jazz festival held each spring and each fall in Cape May, New Jersey. Each installment typically runs for three days. Headliners perform on one of the two main stages, often at the Cape May Convention Hall, and additional performances take place in the bars and restaurants in Cape May. The non-profit Cape May Jazz Festival Foundation operates the festival. New Orleans-style second line parades are typically part of the event.

== Performers ==
Performers have included Dianne Reeves, Meshell Ndegeocello, Wynton Marsalis, Pat Metheny, Chick Corea, Charles Lloyd, the Vijay Iyer Trio, Branford Marsalis, Gabrielle Cavassa, Matthew Whitaker and others.

== See also ==
- James Moody Jazz Festival, annual jazz festival held in Newark, New Jersey
- Chicken Bone Beach Jazz series on Missouri Avenue Beach in Atlantic City
- AAPI Jazz Fest held in Newark, New Jersey
