= The Jersey Shore Film Festival =

Film festival in New Jersey, United States

Jersey Shore Film Festival
- Location: Long Branch and Asbury Park, New Jersey, U.S.
- Founded: 2006
- Language: International
- Website: jerseyshorefilmfestival.com

The Jersey Shore Film Festival (JSFF), founded in 2006 by filmmaker Stevie Doueck, is an annual film festival held in coastal Monmouth County, New Jersey. The festival presents independent films across a range of formats, including narrative features, documentaries, short films, and experimental works. Events and screenings have been hosted in locations such as Long Branch and Asbury Park.

== History ==
The Jersey Shore Film Festival was founded in 2006 as a venue for independent filmmakers to present their work in a regional setting. Early editions of the festival were held in Long Branch and featured a mix of domestic and international films.

By the late 2010s, the festival had expanded in both scale and participation. A 2019 report noted that approximately 100 films were included in that year's program, reflecting continued growth and a broad range of submissions. Coverage from regional publications has documented the festival's ongoing presence within the local arts and film community.

Additional coverage from local print media has also referenced the festival's early development and programming in the region.

== Programming ==
The festival presents independent films across multiple categories, including narrative features, documentaries, and short films. Screenings are typically organized into curated program blocks, allowing audiences to experience a range of styles and subject matter within each session.

The festival has focused on providing a platform for independent and emerging filmmakers, particularly those whose work may not receive wide theatrical distribution. Programming has included both regional and international submissions, contributing to a diverse lineup each year. The festival has also featured films based on real-life events and investigative topics. One such subject, reported by ABC News. The report described identical twins who had been separated at birth as part of a research study. Stories of this nature reflect the type of real-world subject matter often explored in independent documentary programming.

== Awards ==
The Jersey Shore Film Festival includes an awards component recognizing films and filmmakers across various categories. Awards are typically presented during a closing night ceremony at the conclusion of the festival.

== Reception ==
Regional media coverage has described the festival as a venue for independent cinema along the Jersey Shore, noting its role in presenting a wide range of films and supporting filmmakers in the area.
