= African-Americans in Camden, New Jersey =

African-Americans have been residents of Camden, New Jersey's founding in 1828 and have contributed heavily to the city's culture. As of 2023, African-American residents were estimated to make up 42.9% of Camden's population.

== History ==
The Coopers, one of the founding families of what would become Camden, enslaved African-Americans. More than 14 enslaved people worked at Pomona Hall and in the orchards and fields of its 400-acre property. Most of the land is now the Parkside neighborhood of Camden. The area also served as a central point for the buying of enslaved Africans; by 1766, at least 800 enslaved Africans had been sold at the three ferry ports in the area. Two markers commemorating the slave trade in Camden have been erected, in 2017 and 2019 respectively.

In the 1820s and 1830s, African-Americans in Camden often fared better than in other New Jersey communities due to the "patronage and humanitarian interventions of local Quakers".

Camden's earliest African-American neighborhood was named Fettersville, followed by Kaignville, both of which were established on the city's outskirts. In 1832, the Macedonia African Methodist Episcopal Church was founded, making it the city's first African-American church. The church served as a safe house for fugitive slaves on the Underground Railroad. A second African-American church, Kaighn Avenue Baptist Church, was established in 1838.

In June 1950, it is through that a young Martin Luther King Jr. planned a sit-in while visiting Camden.

In 1967, Charles 'Poppy' Sharp founded the Black Believers of Knowledge, an organization founded on the betterment of African American citizens in South Camden. He would soon rename his organization to the Black People's Unity Movement (BPUM). The BPUM was one of the first major cultural organizations to arise after the deindustrialization of Camden's industrial life. Going against the building turmoil in the city, Sharp founded BPUM on "the belief that all the people in our community should contribute to positive change."

In 1969, Black students at Rutgers University-Camden undertook a number of protests to demand better representation of African-American teachers and students on campus, and the improvement of services on campus for Black individuals. On February 10, the Black Student Unity Movement released a list with 24 demands addressed towards university officials. Two weeks later, after students felt Rutgers president Mason W. Gross "continued to be insufficiently attentive", they barricaded themselves inside the campus's College Center on February 26. The protest ended when Gross released a statement that he would address student grievances. Beginning on September 2, 1969, the city saw riots after a white police officer beat a young Black girl. A rally of 300 protesters gathered outside Cooper University Hospital, where a sniper shot and killed a teenage girl and a police officer.

Spring 1971 saw a second wave of protests at the Camden campus, again after Black students felt university officials were not responding adequately to student demands. Several student protesters were expelled and several employees fired. In response, Black students at the Rutgers campuses in New Brunswick and Newark staged their own protests.

=== 21st century ===
In 2001, Camden residents and entrepreneurs founded the South Jersey Caribbean Cultural and Development Organization (SJCCDO) as a non-profit organization aimed at promoting understanding and awareness of Caribbean Culture in South Jersey and Camden. The most prominent of the events that the SJCCDO organizes is the South Jersey Caribbean Festival, an event that is held for both cultural and economical reasons. The festival's primary focus is cultural awareness of all of Camden's residents. The festival also showcases free art and music as well as financial information and free promotion for Camden artists.

In 1986, Tawanda 'Wawa' Jones began the Camden Sophisticated Sisters, a youth drill team. CSS serves as a self-proclaimed 'positive outlet' for the Camden' students, offering both dance lessons as well as community service hours and social work opportunities. Since its conception CSS has grown to include two other organizations, all ran through Jones: Camden Distinguished Brothers and The Almighty Percussion Sound drum line. In 2013, CSS was featured on ABC's Dancing with the Stars.

Corinne's Place is a Black-owned soul food restaurant located in Camden, New Jersey. Corinne Bradley-Powers opened the restaurant on Haddon Avenue in 1989. In February 2022, The James Beard Foundation awarded Corinne's Place with the America's Classic award. The James Beard America's Classics Award is awarded to "locally owned restaurants that have timeless appeal and beloved regionally for quality food that reflects the character of its community." Corinne's Place is one of six soul food restaurants that have been awarded the America's Classic Award to date.
