= Black history in Atlantic City, New Jersey =

African Americans make up more than a third of Atlantic City, New Jersey's population. Sarah Spencer Washington was a successful businesswoman and community leader. James Leroy Usry was the city's first Black mayor. Fannie Lou Hamer spoke at the 1964 Democratic National Convention in Atlantic City. Richlyn Faye Goddard wrote about the community and carried out oral history interviews.

African Americans came to Atlantic City in substantial numbers during the Great Migration. They were relegated to the city's north side.

Publications included Black Atlantic City Magazine from 1979 to 1986. It was renamed Black New Jersey Magazine in 1987 and was published until 1990. The Atlantic Advocate was a newspaper ca. 1915 edited and published by James A. Garfield Lightfoot, a lawyer. Its address was documented as 40 North Indiana Avenue. Lightfoor's law partner was Isaac Henry Nutter. Nutter and Lightfoot were graduates of Howard University.

After 1900, Black beachgoers were limited to Missouri Avenue Beach. The New Jersey State Library posted a video about the beach on YouTube.

C. Morris Cain was active in the community. The six-story Liberty Hotel on Baltic Avenue served Black customers after segregation was imposed during the Jim Crow era. Dick Austin, an immigrant from the West Indies, owned Dick Austin's Rose Garden and homes he rented to vacationing tourists. Club Harlem was a thriving entertainment venue.

The Works Project Administration conducted studies and published on "Negro" life in New Jersey including a "History of the Negro Church in New Jersey". The Organization of Teachers of Colored Children in the State of New Jersey met in Atlantic City.

The African American Heritage Museum of Southern New Jersey is in Atlantic City.
