= Union County Performing Arts Center =

- Rahway Theatre
- U.S. National Register of Historic Places
- New Jersey Register of Historic Places
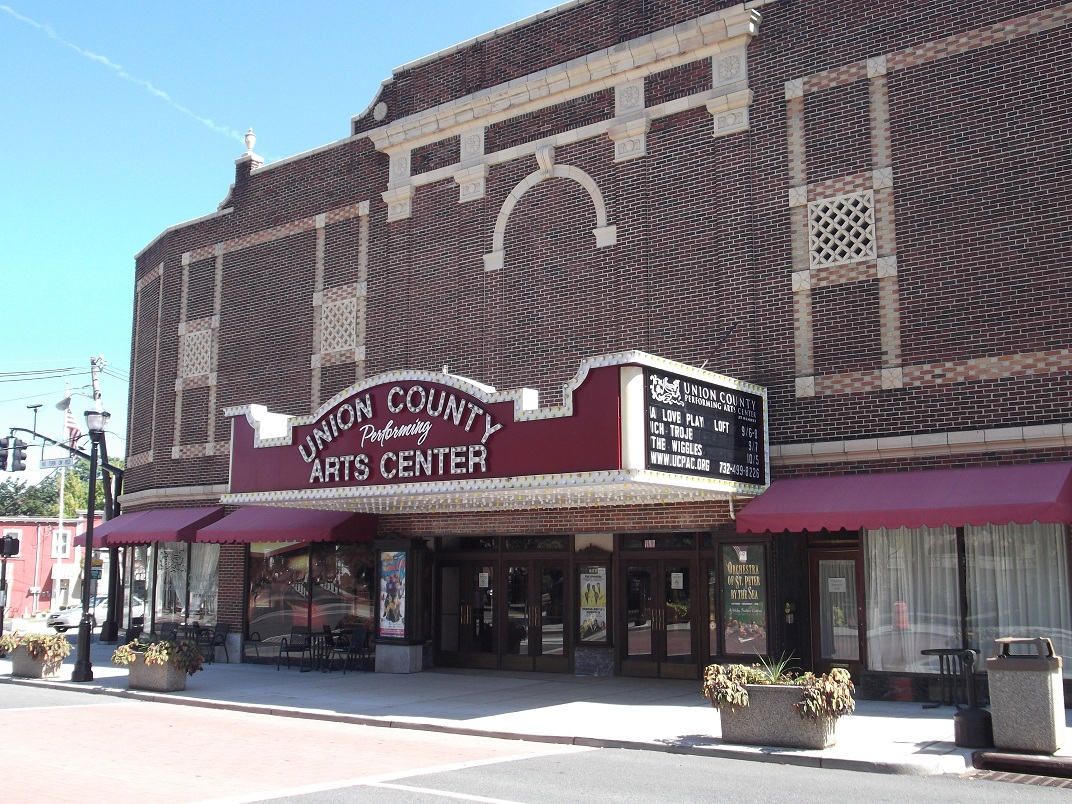
- Facade of the Rahway Theatre

- Location within Union County, New Jersey Location within New Jersey Location within the United States
- Location: 1601 Irving St., Rahway, New Jersey
- Coordinates: 40°36′37″N 74°16′39″W
- Built: 1927
- Architect: David M Oltarsh
- Architectural style: Classical Revival
- Website: www.ucpac.org
- NRHP reference No.: 86001509
- NJRHP No.: 2714

Significant dates
- Added to NRHP: August 13, 1986
- Designated NJRHP: June 24, 1986

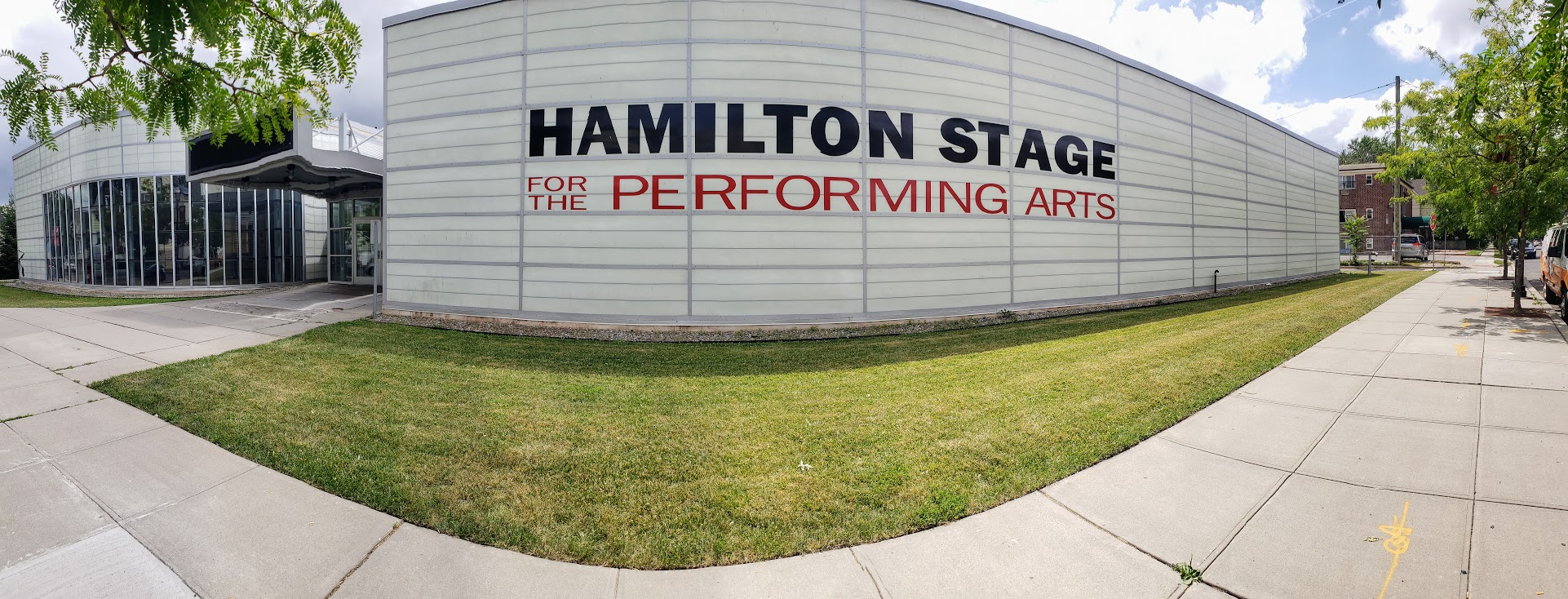
Panorama of the Hamilton Stage complex at the Union County Performing Arts Center in Rahway

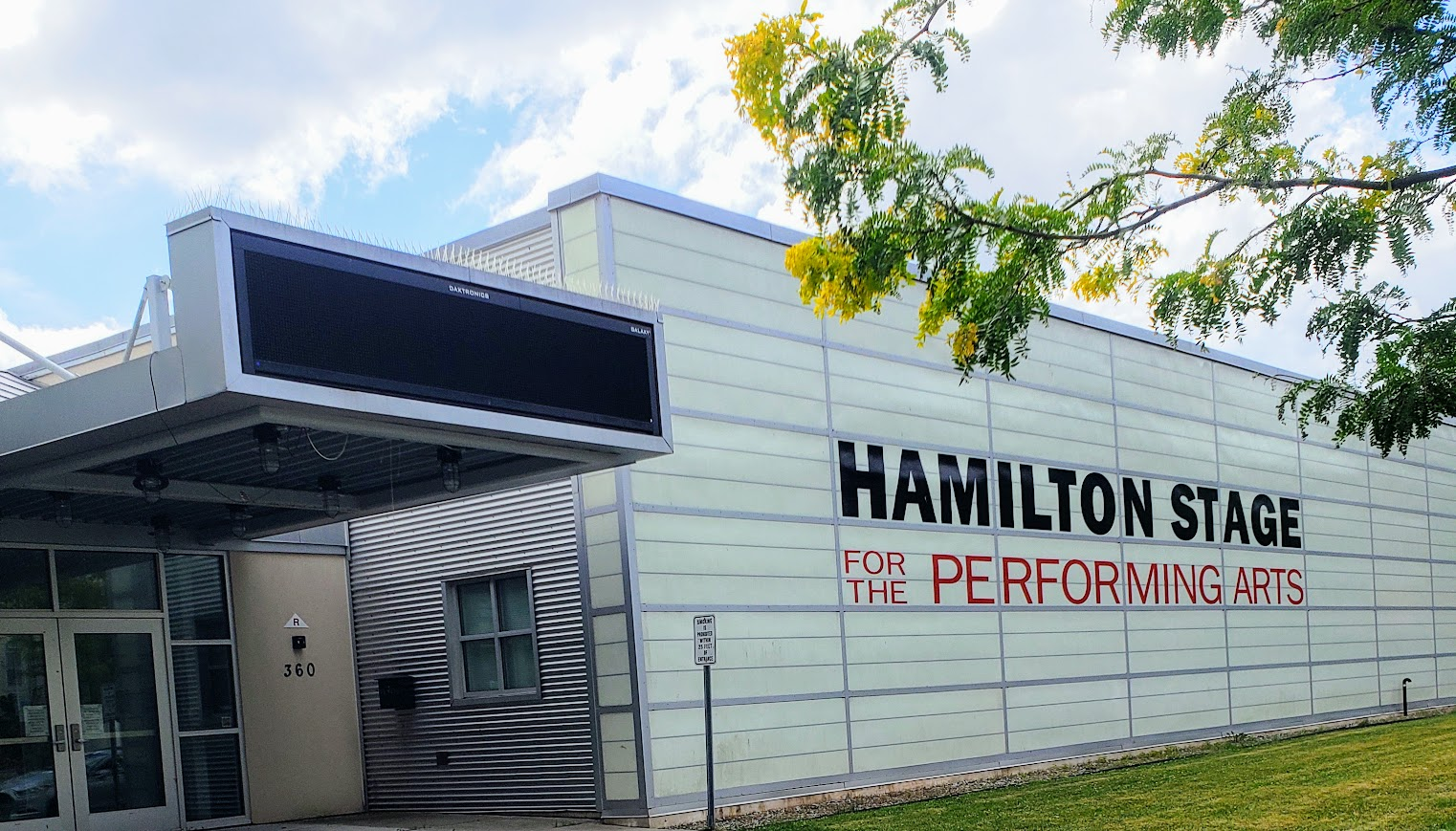
Box office at the Hamilton Stage for the Performing Arts at UCPAC in Rahway

Union County Performing Arts Center (UCPAC), formerly the "movie palace" known as the Rahway Theatre, is a non-profit performance venue in Rahway, New Jersey, a small city west of Staten Island that was recently named "#2 Best Small Town Arts Scene" in the country by USA Today. As of the early 2020s, downtown Rahway has become a regional hub in the performing and visual arts. It was added to the National Register of Historic Places in 1986.

== History ==
It was founded as the vaudeville venue and silent movie house Rahway Theater in 1928 as an ornate movie palace. It contains an original, working, fully restored Wurlitzer pipe organ which was placed on the American Theatre Organ Society's National Registry of Significant Instruments. It is an example of "Movie Palace" architecture, designed in the classical revival style by New York architect David M. Oltarsh.

In 2006, at the behest of Rahway's then-mayor James J. Kennedy, the Union County Board of Chosen Freeholders invested $6.2 million in the renovation of the UCPAC Mainstage (Rahway Theater). The building fell into dilapidation as a movie house in the 1970s. It was reopened by local nonprofit preservation group in 1984, and was listed on the National Register of Historic Places in 1986.

== Facilities ==
The UCPAC campus includes four performance spaces:

=== Mainstage ===
Capacity: 1334

=== Hamilton Stage ===
Renovated in 2023-24 and built in 2012 abutting the Rahway River several hundred feet to the west of Mainstage, the Hamilton Stage features a new fully equipped proscenium theater.

Capacity: 199

=== The Loft at Mainstage ===
Capacity: 65. Built in 2008, the Loft at UCPAC is located on the 2nd floor addition of the UCPAC Mainstage.

=== The Fazioli Room at Hamilton Stage ===
This 40’ x 60’ rehearsal space has floor-to-ceiling conservatory windows and wall-length mirrors on one side. It holds 55–75 (at maximum).

This room contains a Fazioli piano, one of only two in New Jersey.

=== The Café at UCPAC ===
Hosts the Jazz Club at UCPAC.

== Programming ==
Well-known music and comedy acts have included Johnny Cash, Martina McBride, Willie Nelson, B.B. King, Joan Jett, Joan Rivers, Louie Anderson, Sinbad, Cedric the Entertainer, Pat Benatar, Kenny Rogers, Lance Bass, Eddie Money, En Vogue, Starship, Otown, Aaron Carter, Ryan Cabrera, Bowling for Soup, Vanessa Williams, Doug E. Fresh, Mark McGrath and Slick Rick.

== Film ==
The Main Stage at UCPAC in Rahway, as a former "classic movie palace," is the only New Jersey theater showing classic 35mm films, generally preceded by organ performances on the venue's original Wurlitzer theater organ.

The UCPAC Film Festival is held at the venue.

== Rahway Arts District ==
The UCPAC area hosts many art galleries, converted industrial warehouse spaces, and rehearsal/studio space. In 2020, downtown Rahway received accolades as a Great Downtown by the APA:

"Downtown Rahway is a great place. It is a place that emphasizes livability, walkability, shopping, food, art, diversity and a destination. Centered in the heart of the bustling City of Rahway, next to the NJ Transit Station, Rahway's downtown is the building block for this diverse city."

=== The Willows Residence for the Arts ===
The city of Rahway and UCPAC in association with the Actors Fund has built safe affordable housing for artists only. Tenant applicants need to submit a portfolio of work to indicate their vocation and be assigned to a waitlist.

== Transportation ==
UCPAC is walking distance to the direct train at Rahway Station to New York Penn Station. The ride is 38 minutes.

== See also ==
- New Jersey music venues by capacity
- Crossroads
