= National Association of Private Special Education Centers =

The National Association of Private Special Education Centers is a non-profit association that represents private special education centers and their leaders. The group promotes programs for individuals with disabilities and their families and advocates for access to alternative placements and services. It is the National Commission for the Accreditation of Special Education Services parent organization.

== Members ==
- Hawkswood School, Eatontown, New Jersey
- Brehm Preparatory School, Carbondale, Illinois
- Brookfield Schools, Cherry Hill, New Jersey
