= Cindy Lee Van Dover =

American marine biologist

- Scientific career
- Fields: Biological Oceanography
- Institutions: Duke University

Cindy Lee Van Dover (born 1954) is the Harvey Smith Professor of Biological Oceanography and chair of the Division of Marine Science and Conservation at Duke University. She is also the director of the Duke University Marine Laboratory. Her primary area of research is oceanography, but she also studies biodiversity, biogeochemistry, conservation biology, ecology, and marine science.

== Education ==
Raised in Eatontown, New Jersey, Van Dover attended Monmouth Regional High School and graduated from Rutgers University in 1977 with a B.S. in Environmental Science. In 1985, Van Dover earned her master's degree in ecology from UCLA. She received her Ph.D. in 1989 from the Massachusetts Institute of Technology/Woods Hole Oceanographic Institution Joint Program in Biological Oceanography. In the MIT/Woods Hole Oceanographic Institution Joint Program in Biological Oceanography, she joined numerous expeditions and published on diverse topics such as reproductive strategies and recruitment of vent invertebrates, vent food webs, and taxonomic descriptions of new species. On receiving her Ph.D. in 1989, Van Dover joined the group that operates the deep-diving submersible ALVIN.

== Achievements ==
In 1982, Van Dover joined the first biological research expedition to the East Pacific Rise and she had her first dive in the DSV Alvin on the Galápagos rift in 1985. In 1990, she became the 49th to earn the Naval Dolphinfish pin to operate and pilot the DSV Alvin, in addition to becoming Alvin's first female pilot. She made 48 dives as pilot-in-command of Alvin and participated in more than 100 such dives in total. On such expeditions, she discovered new species of mussels, shrimp, tube worms, and bacteria.

Prior to her current role at Duke University, Van Dover was the Mary Derrickson McCurdy Visiting Scholar at the Duke University Marine Lab. She has also held teaching positions at the College of William and Mary and the University of Oregon and several research positions including a Fulbright Research Scholar at the Centre de Brest in France and as Science Director of the West Coast National Undersea Research Center.

Her current research focuses primarily on the study of biodiversity, biogeography, and connectivity of invertebrates from chemosynthetic ecosystems and invertebrate functional anatomy. In addition, she is active in developing pre-industrialization policy and management strategies for deep-sea resources and their extraction.

She has received dozens of research grants, including many from the National Science Foundation, the National Oceanic and Atmospheric Administration, and the National Aeronautics and Space Administration.

In addition to research, Van Dover authored the book Deep-Ocean Journeys for the lay audience about the deep sea and her experiences as an ALVIN pilot. She is the author of the first textbook on hydrothermal vents (The Ecology of Deep-Sea Hydrothermal Vents; Princeton University Press, 2000), is curator of ‘Beyond the Edge of the Sea’, a traveling exhibition of original deep-sea art by watercolor artist Karen Jacobsen, and is helping to develop Art and Science: Envisioning Ocean Depths, a mixed media exhibition. She has published over 90 academic papers, in addition to policy briefs, encyclopedia entries, and extended abstracts.

== Awards and honors ==
Van Dover is the recipient of many awards, including:

- Université catholique de Louvain honoris causa doctorate (2017)
- WHOI Women's Committee Annual Lecture (2011)
- Mines Medal (2009)
- Duke University Presidential Award in Executive Leadership (2009)
- Wings World Quest Fellow (2008)
- Thomas A. Langford Lecturer (2007)
- Virginia Outstanding Scientist (2006)
- Keynote Speaker in Biological and Biomedical Science, Harvard University Medical School
- Fulbright Research Scholar (2004)
- George Hammell Cook Distinguished Alumni Award (2004)
- Distinguished Scientist Lecturer, Smithsonian Institution Senate of Scientists (2004)
- William & Mary Alumni Fellowship for Outstanding Teaching (2003)
- Fellow of the American Association for the Advancement of Science (2001)
- NSF CAREER Award (2002)
- Laura Randall Schweppe Visiting Scholar, University of Texas (2001)
- American Geophysical Union Rachel Carson Lecturer (2000)
- Editor's Citation for Excellence in Refereeing (Reviews of Geophysics) (1993)
- NSF Graduate Fellowship (1984)

Van Dover is a Founding Trustee of the Consortium for Ocean Leadership and founder of ChEss, an international scientific body for the study of the biogeography of deep-water chemosynthetic ecosystems. She chaired the NASA Astrobiology CAN5 Review Panel and the Replacement HOV Oversight Committee, in addition to having been a member of the National Association of Marine Laboratories, the Duke-UNC Oceanographic Consortium Program Advisory Committee, the Deep Submergence Science Committee, the NSF Informal Science Education Review Panel, and the COSEE National Advisory Council. Van Dover is a Fulbright Scholar and Fellow of the American Association for the Advancement of Science. She is currently the Harvey W Smith Professor of Biological Oceanography in the Division of Marine Science and Conservation of the Nicholas School of the Environment, Duke University, where she serves as Chair of the Division and Director of the Marine Laboratory and is the first woman in that position.
