= Shannon Valley =

American climate scientist

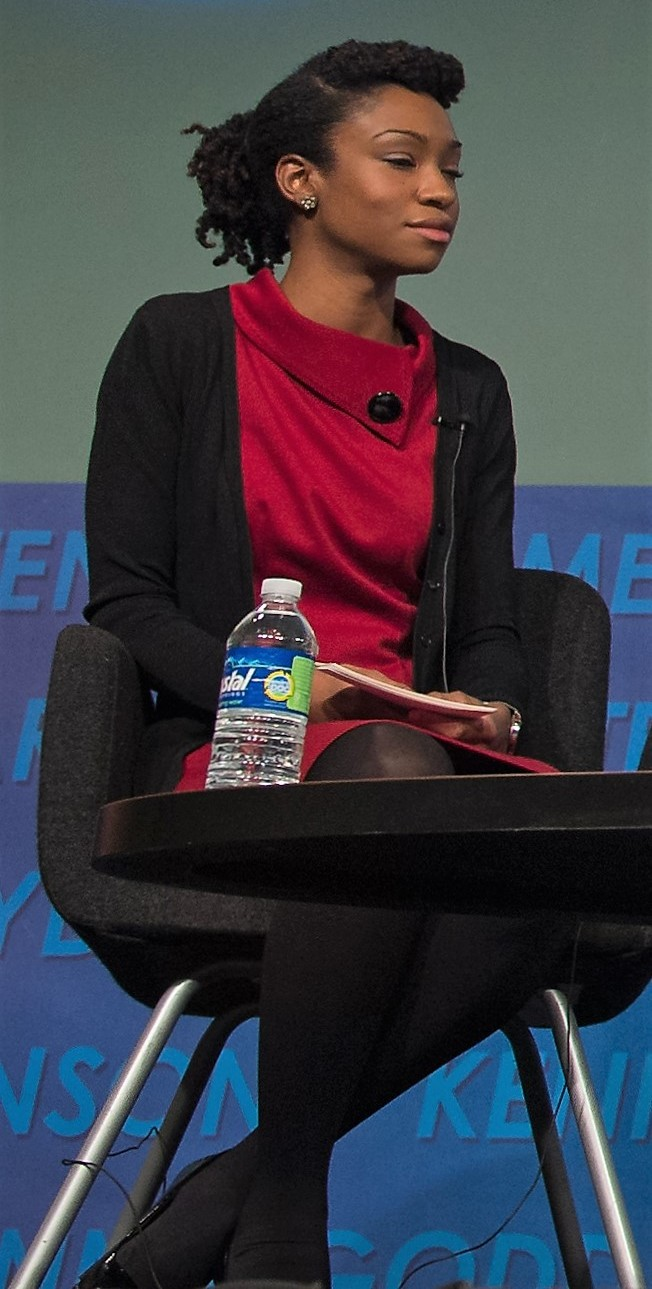
- Valley moderates a 2013 NASA panel discussion
- Born: Shannon Gabrielle Valley
- Education: Northwestern University; Georgia Tech
- Known for: Climate science Science policy
- Scientific career
- Workplaces: Georgia Tech
- Thesis: Atlantic meridional overturning circulation variability since the last glaciation: Insights from a novel multiproxy approach (2019)

Shannon Gabrielle Valley is an American climate scientist and policy advisor. She is based at Georgia Tech, where she studies the climate history of planet Earth. She worked as a liaison between the White House and NASA Headquarters for the Obama administration. In 2020, Valley was appointed to Joe Biden's NASA transition team.

== Education and early career ==
Valley spent her childhood in St. Louis and Houston. She attended public high school, where she first discovered science through introductory courses. She earned a bachelor's degree in political science at Northwestern University in 2007. After completing her undergraduate studies, Valley joined the Obama administration. She took part in Camp Obama, a gathering for organizers working on the 2008 campaign. She spent five years working between scientists at NASA Headquarters and the United States Congress. She enjoyed meeting the scientists, but became frustrated that she was not doing her own research. The impact of Hurricane Katrina on her Houston community inspired her to want to contribute more herself. Having decided that she wanted more formal training to become a scientist, Valley started to complete night courses in advanced mathematics. In 2015, Valley was awarded a National Science Foundation graduate research fellowship (NSF-GRFP), and joined Georgia Tech as a graduate student, where she worked under the supervision of Jean Lynch-Stieglitz. In 2016, she was awarded a masters degree from Georgia Tech in Earth and Atmospheric Sciences.

== Research and career ==
After earning her doctorate from Georgia Tech in 2019, Valley was appointed as a postdoctoral researcher in paleoceanography. In 2020, Valley was appointed to Joe Biden's NASA transition team, who serve to advise the president-elect in preparation for the inauguration.

== Selected publications ==
- Lynch-Stieglitz, Jean; Valley, Shannon G.; Schmidt, Matthew W. (January 15, 2019). "Temperature-dependent ocean–atmosphere equilibration of carbon isotopes in surface and intermediate waters over the deglaciation". Earth and Planetary Science Letters. 506: 466–475. Bibcode:2019E&PSL.506..466L. doi:10.1016/j.epsl.2018.11.024. ISSN 0012-821X. S2CID 134613184.
- Valley, Shannon G.; Lynch-Stieglitz, Jean; Marchitto, Thomas M. (October 1, 2019). "Intermediate water circulation changes in the Florida Straits from a 35 ka record of Mg/Li-derived temperature and Cd/Ca-derived seawater cadmium". Earth and Planetary Science Letters. 523: 115692. Bibcode:2019E&PSL.52315692V. doi:10.1016/j.epsl.2019.06.032. ISSN 0012-821X.

== Awards and honors ==
- 2014: NASA Exceptional Achievement Medal
