= Discharge of radioactive water of the Fukushima Daiichi Nuclear Power Plant =

Radioactive water from a 2011 nuclear accident in Japan

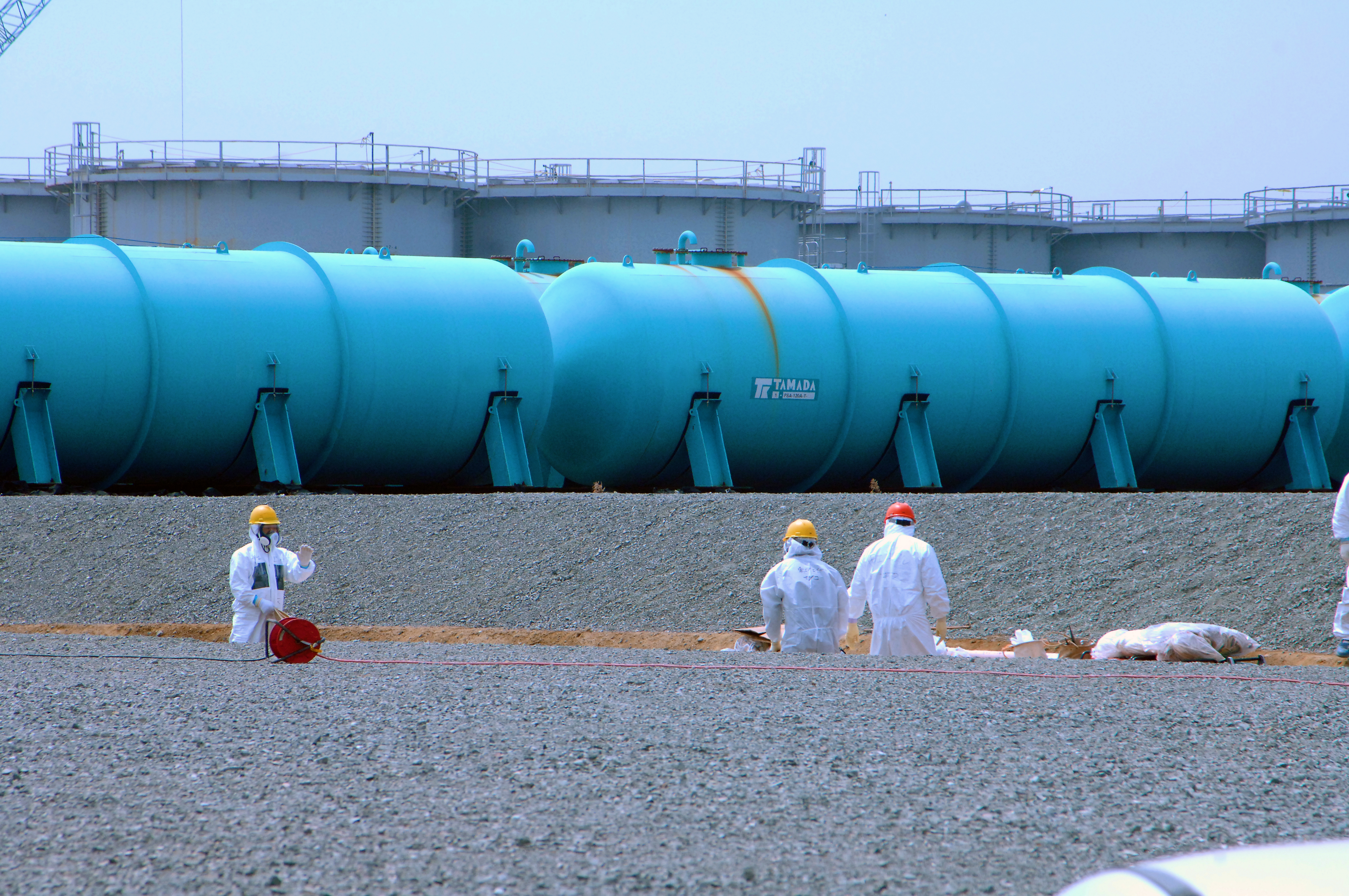
Water is stored in three types of facilities though there are occasional leaks. Two varieties of above-ground water tanks are seen at the back, and the workers are working in an underground storage pool.

Radioactive water from the Fukushima Daiichi Nuclear Power Plant in Japan began being discharged into the Pacific Ocean on 11 March 2011, following the Fukushima Daiichi nuclear disaster triggered by the Tōhoku earthquake and tsunami. Three of the plant's reactors experienced meltdowns, leaving behind melted fuel debris. Water was introduced to prevent the meltdowns from progressing further. When cooling water, groundwater, and rain came into contact with the melted fuel debris, they became contaminated with radioactive nuclides, such as iodine-131, caesium-134, caesium-137, and strontium-90.

Over 500,000 tonnes of untreated wastewater (including 10,000 tonnes released to free up storage space) escaped into the ocean shortly after the accident. In addition, persistent leakage into groundwater was not admitted by the plant operator until 2013. The radioactivity from these sources exceeded legal limits.

Since then, contaminated water has been pumped into storage units and gradually treated using the Advanced Liquid Processing System (ALPS) to eliminate most radionuclides, except notably tritium with a half-life of 12.32 years, which is chemically bonded to the water. In 2021, the Japanese cabinet approved the release of ALPS-treated water containing tritium. Because it is still radioactive immediately after treatment, the solution will be diluted by sea water to a lower concentration before being discharged.

A review report by the International Atomic Energy Agency (IAEA) shows that the plan of discharging diluted ALPS-treated water into the sea is consistent with relevant international safety standards. It also emphasizes that the release of the treated water is a national decision by the Government of Japan and its report is neither a recommendation nor an endorsement of the decision.

On 24 August 2023, the power plant started releasing the treated portion of its wastewater into the Pacific Ocean. At the time, its storage units held over a million tonnes of wastewater in total. Because new wastewater is constantly being formed and even treated water must be discharged slowly by diluting it with more sea water, the entire process could take more than 30 years. The decision to release this water into the ocean has faced concerns and criticism from other countries and international organisations.

As of the fourth round of discharge in March 2024, no elevated tritium levels have been detected in nearby waters.

== Initial atmospheric release ==
Caesium-137 concentration in the air, 19 March 2011

Radioactive materials were dispersed into the atmosphere immediately after the disaster and account for most of all such materials leaked into the environment. 80% of the initial atmospheric release eventually deposited over rivers and the Pacific Ocean, according to a UNSCEAR report in 2020. Specifically, "the total releases to the atmosphere of iodine-131 and caesium-137 ranged generally between about 100 to about 500 PBq [petabecquerel, 10^{15} Bq] and 6 to 20 PBq, respectively. The ranges correspond to about 2% to 8% of the total inventory of iodine-131 and about 1% to 3% of the total inventory of caesium-137 in the three operating units (Units 1–3)".

=== Deposition on river ===
The indirect deposition to rivers come from the earlier direct discharge to the atmosphere. "Continuing indirect releases of about 5 to 10 TBq [terabecquerel, 10^{12} Bq] of caesium-137 per year via rivers draining catchment areas", according to the UNSCEAR report in 2020.

== Discharge to ocean, untreated water (2011) ==
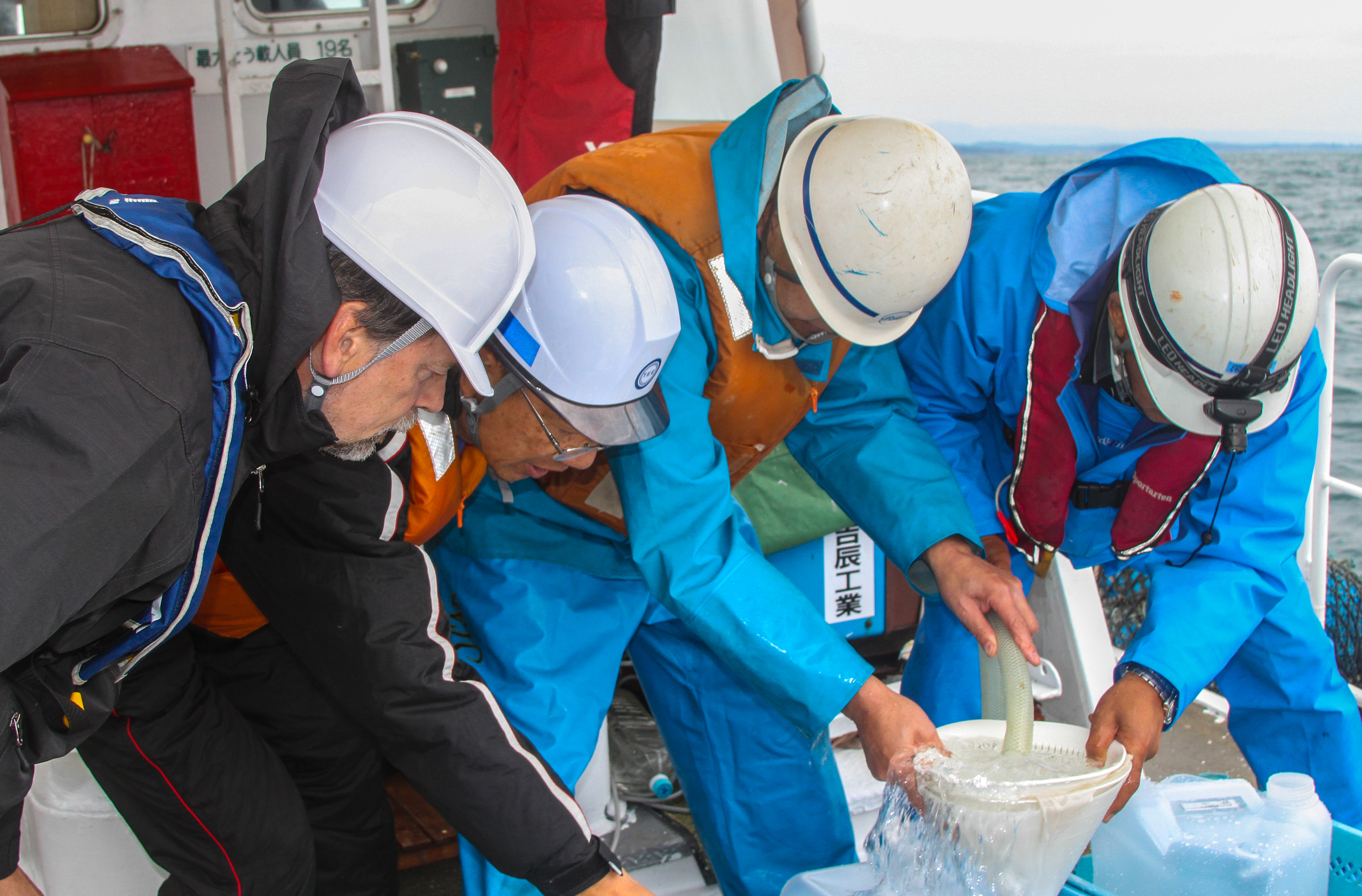
Sea water sampling supervised by IAEA staff (left).

On 5 April 2011, the operator of the nuclear plant, Tokyo Electric Power Company (TEPCO), discharged 11,500 tons of untreated water into the Pacific Ocean in order to free up storage space for water that is even more radioactive. The untreated water was the least radioactively contaminated among the stored water, but still 100 times the legal limit. TEPCO estimated that a total of 520,000 tons of untreated radioactive water had escaped into the ocean before it could place silt fences to contain further spills.

The UNSCEAR report in 2020 determined "direct releases in the first three months amounting to about 10 to 20 PBq [petabecquerel, 10^{15} Bq] of iodine-131 and about 3 to 6 PBq of caesium-137". About 82 percent having flowed into the sea before 8 April 2011.

== Discharge to soil and groundwater by leakage ==
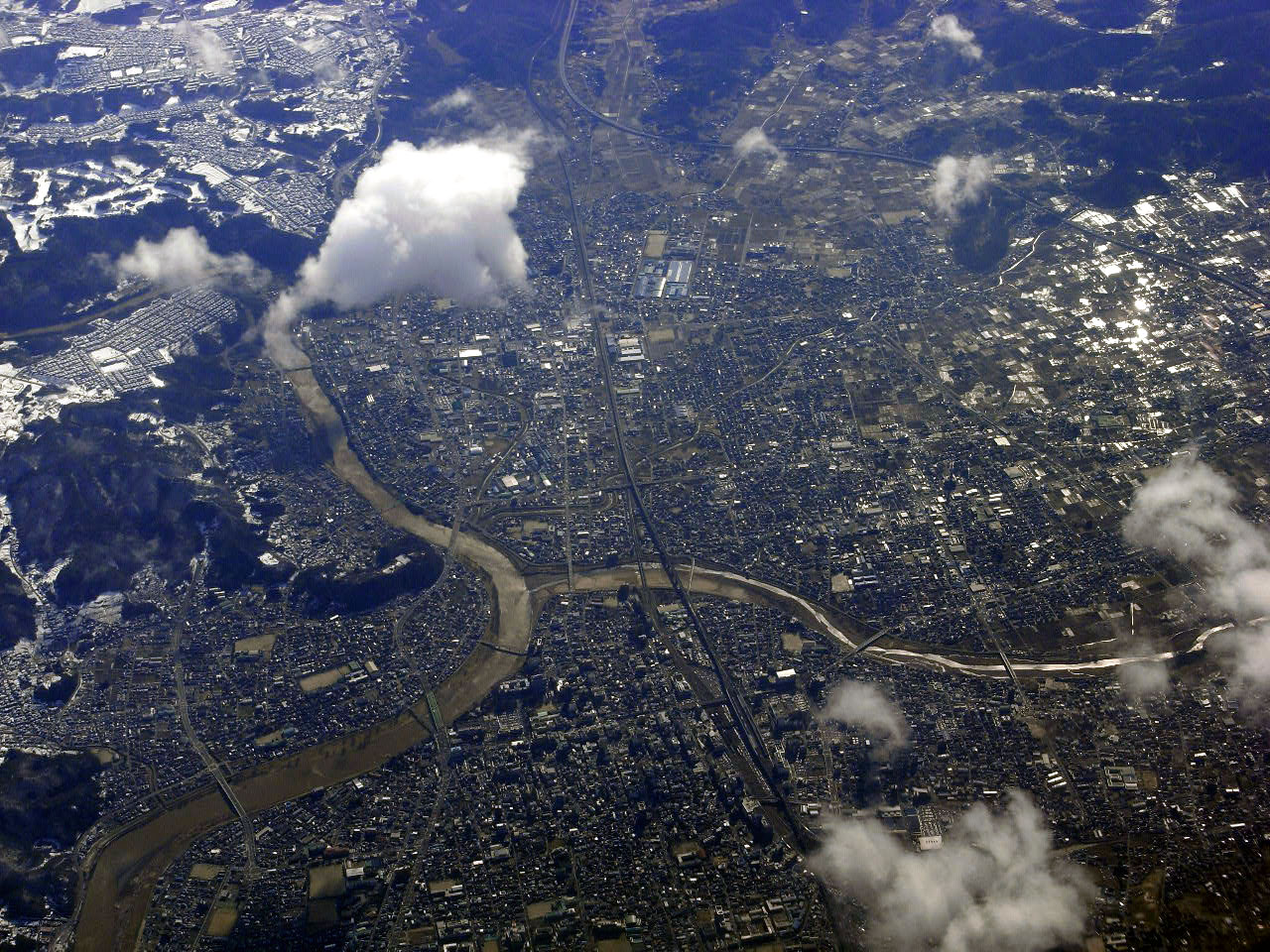
Abukuma River was banned from fishing for 10 years for radioactivity reasons. It reopened in April 2021.

Scientists suspected that radioactive elements continued to leak into the ocean. High levels of caesium-134 were found in local fish, despite the isotope's comparatively shorter half-life. Meanwhile, radiation levels in the nearby sea water did not fall as expected. After repeated denials, the operator of the nuclear plant, Tokyo Electric Power Company (TEPCO), finally admitted on 22 July 2013 that leaks to groundwater had been happening. Some groundwater samples contained 310 Bq/L of cesium-134 and 650 Bq/L of cesium-137, exceeding WHO's maximum guideline of 10 Bq/L for drinking water.

It was later determined that some of the leaks came from the storage tanks for wastewater. Since then, TEPCO has had a record of being dishonest on its figures and has lost the public trust. For instance, in 2014, TEPCO blamed its own measuring method and revised the strontium in a groundwater well in July 2013 from 900,000 Bq/L to 5,000,000 Bq/L, which is 160,000 times the standard for discharge.

While soil naturally absorbs the caesium in groundwater, strontium and tritium can flow through more freely. At one time, nearly 400 tonnes of radioactive water was being formed every day (150,000 tonnes per year). TEPCO has since tried to stem or divert the inflow of groundwater to the damaged reactor sites and prevent contaminated water from escaping into the ocean.

The UNSCEAR report in 2020 concluded "Direct release of about 60 TBq [terabecquerel, 10^{12} Bq] of caesium-137 in ground water draining from the site up to October 2015, when measures were taken to reduce these releases, and about 0.5 TBq per year thereafter".

In February 2024, a leak at the power plant was detected by a contractor and eventually repaired by TEPCO. The company estimated that 5.5 tonnes of water, which potentially contained 22 billion becquerels of radioactive materials such as caesium and strontium, had escaped from an air vent, pooled outside and seeped into the surrounding soil, but did not leave the plant compound. It said this was caused by 10 out of 16 valves being left open when they should have been closed for flushing.

== Discharge to ocean, treated water ==
=== Advanced Liquid Processing System (2013–) ===
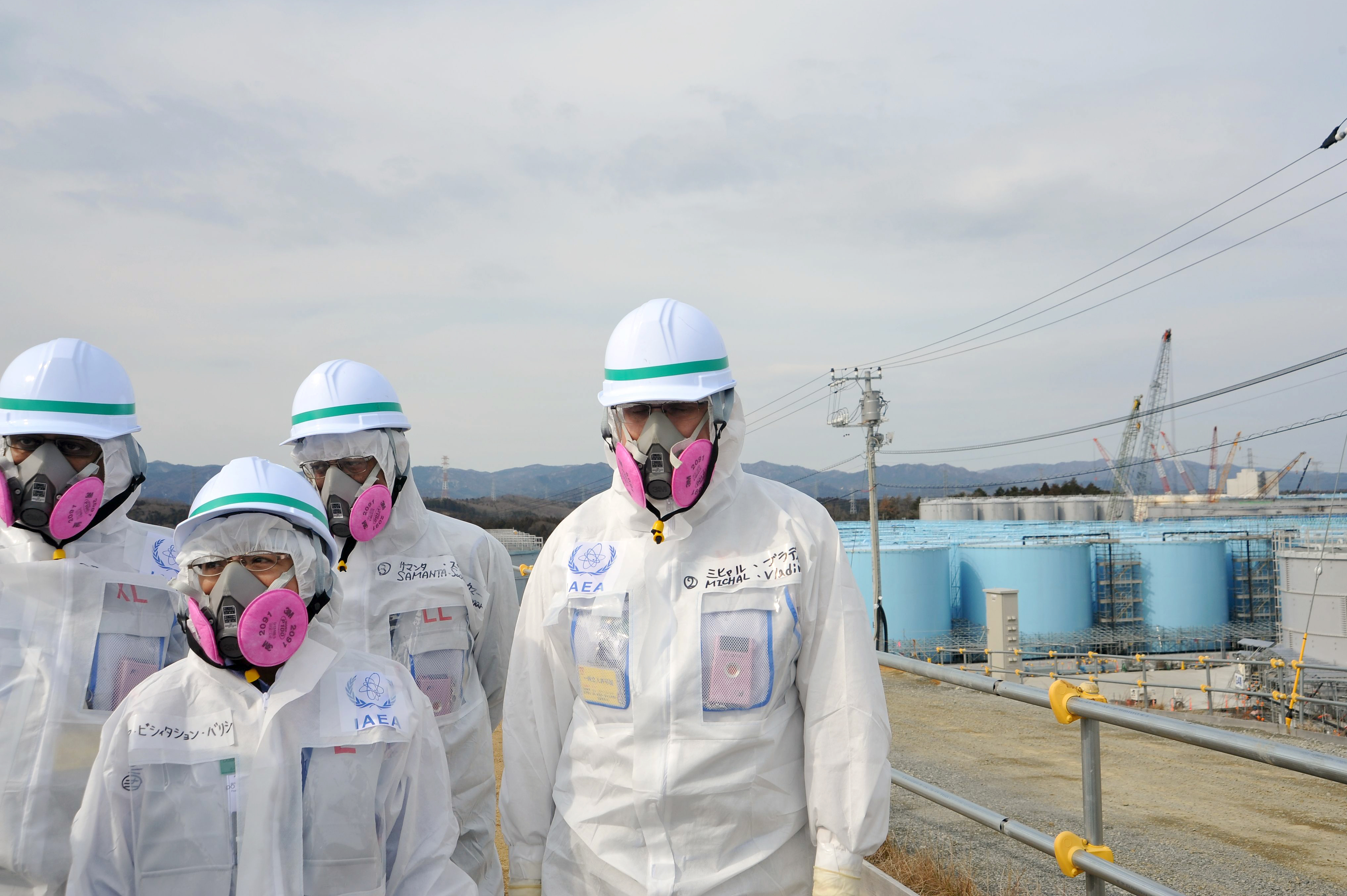
One of the three types of water storage facilities at the power plant.

To prevent the reactor meltdowns from worsening, a continuous supply of new water is necessary to cool the melted fuel debris. As of 2013, 400 metric tonnes of water was becoming radioactively contaminated each day. The contaminated water is pumped out and combined into the reactor-cooling loop, which includes strontium–cesium removal (KURION, SURRY) and reverse osmosis desalination processes.

In October 2012, TEPCO introduced the "Advanced Liquid Processing System" (ALPS, Japanese: 多核種除去設備), which is designed to remove radionuclides other than tritium (which is chemically bonded to the water) and carbon-14. ALPS works by first pre-processing the water by iron coprecipitation (removes alpha-emitting nuclides and organics) and carbonate coprecipitation (removes alkali earth metals including strontium elements). The water is then passed through 16 absorbent columns to remove nuclides.

Wastewater is pumped to ALPS along with the concentrated saltwater from desalination. As some tritium still remains, even treated water would require dilution to meet drinkable standards. Although carbon-14 is not removed, the content in pre-treatment water is low enough to meet drinkable standards without dilution.

Japan's Nuclear Regulation Authority (NRA) approved the design of ALPS in March 2013. ALPS is to be run in three independent units and will be able to purify 250 tons of water per day. Unit "A" started operation in April. In June, unit A was found to be leaking water and shut down. In July, the cause was narrowed down to chloride and hypochlorite corrosion of water tanks; TEPCO responded by adding a rubber layer into the tanks. By August, all systems were shut down awaiting repair. One unit was expected to come online by September, with full recovery planned by the end of 2013.

By September 2018, TEPCO reports that 20% of the water had been treated to the required level.

By 2020, the daily buildup of contaminated water was reduced to 170 metric tonnes thanks to groundwater isolation installations. TEPCO reports that 72% of the water in its tanks, some from early trials of ALPS, needed to be repurified. The portion of ready-to-discharge water raised to 34% by 2021, and to 35% by 2023.

Some scientists expressed reservations due to potential bioaccumulation of ruthenium, cobalt, strontium, and plutonium, which sometimes slip through the ALPS process and were present in 71% of the tanks.

==== Japanese approval and monitoring (2021-) ====
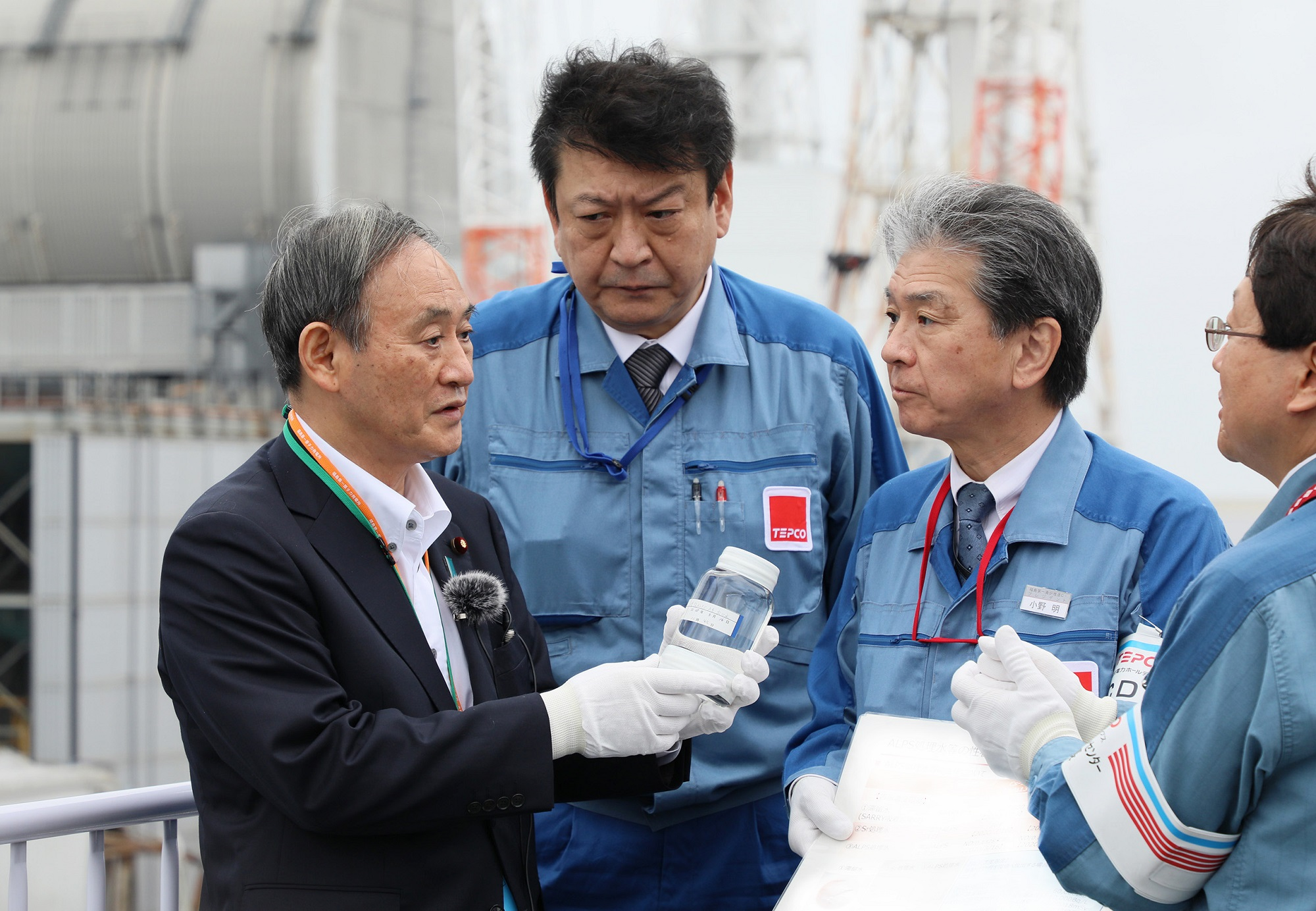
Prime Minister Yoshihide Suga holding a bottle of treated radioactive water and was affirmed "after diluting it would be drinkable". Fukushima plant, 2020.

Since the 2011 Fukushima Daiichi nuclear disaster, the nuclear plant has accumulated 1.25 million tonnes of waste water, stored in 1,061 tanks on the land of the nuclear plant, as of March 2021. It was projected that the site would run out of land for water tanks by 2022. It has been suggested the government could have solved the problem by allocating more land surrounding the power plant for water tanks, since the surrounding area had been designated as unsuitable for humans. Regardless, the government was reluctant to act. Mainichi Shimbun criticized the government for showing "no sincerity" in "unilaterally push[ing] through with the logic that there will no longer be enough storage space".

On 13 April 2021, the Cabinet of Prime Minister Yoshihide Suga unanimously approved that TEPCO dump the stored water to the Pacific Ocean over a course of 30 years. The Cabinet asserted the dumped water will be treated and diluted to drinkable standard. The idea of dumping had been floated by Japanese experts and officials as early as June 2016. A kawaii mascot for the dump, Tritium-kun, was even created in hopes of improving public opinion on the issue; it was quickly scrapped after backlash.

In April 2023, Japan's NRA announced a Comprehensive Radiation Monitoring Plan, in which the concentration of radionuclides in food (land and sea), soil, water, and air will be continually monitored across Japan. NRA also set up a system to monitor the radionuclide concentration in ALPS-processed water in order to verify TEPCO's readings.

==== International testing ====
An IAEA task force was dispatched to Japan in 2021, and they released their first report in February 2022. Among other findings, TEPCO has demonstrated to IAEA that their pump setup thoroughly mixes waters in tanks.

In May 2023, 3 IAEA laboratories and 4 national laboratories participated in an interlaboratory comparison to verify TEPCO's testing of ALPS-treated water. Out of the 30 radionuclides TEPCO regularly tests for, 12 were found to be above detection limits. 52 out of 53 results were found to agree with the combined result; the only problematic result was of I-129, where Korea Institute of Nuclear Safety reported a value too low compared to the weighted average. TEPCO's methology was found to be fit for purpose: although it is less sensitive for actinides than some participating labs, the detection limits were far enough from regulatory limits, and the alpha-emission screening test appears accurate enough. TEPCO's testing method for Am-141 may require additional review. The same sample was tested by Japan's NRA with no disagreements found.

The tritium that is not filtered out has a radioactivity of 148,900 Bq/L, compared to 620,000 Bq/L before treatment. TEPCO intends to dilute it down to 1,500 Bq/L or less before release.

=== Discharge into the Pacific Ocean (2023–) ===
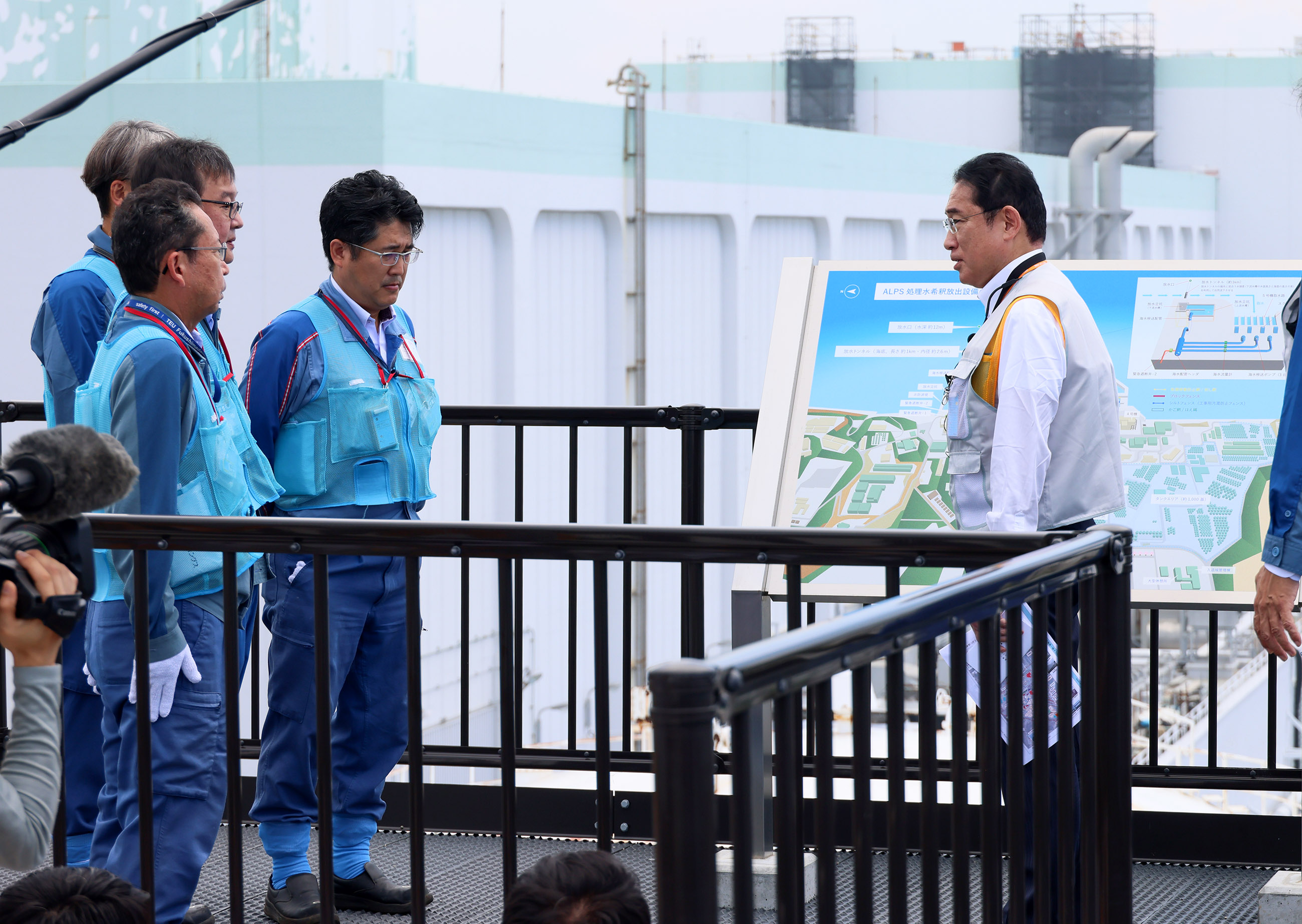
Prime Minister Kishida visiting the Fukushima plant in August 2023; Kishida's government continued with the planned water discharge.

On 22 August 2023, Japan announced that it would start releasing treated radioactive water from the tsunami-hit Fukushima nuclear plant into the Pacific Ocean in 48 hours, despite opposition from its neighbours. Japan says the water is safe after the use of Advanced Liquid Processing System (ALPS), which removes nearly all traces of radiation from the wastewater, with tritium being the primary exception to this. As a result, Japan has committed to diluting the water in order to bring levels of tritium below the regulatory standards set by the International Atomic Energy Agency. The International Atomic Energy Agency has stated that the plan meets safety standards, but critics contend that more studies need to be done and the release should be halted. On 24 August, Japan began the discharge of treated waste water into the Pacific Ocean, sparking protests in the region and China to expand its ban to all aquatic imports from Japan. Over 1 million tonnes of treated wastewater will be released by Japan over the next thirty years as per the plan.

On August 25, TEPCO reported that the amount of tritium in seawater around Fukushima has remained below the detection limit of 10 Bq/L. The Japanese Fishery Agency reported that fish caught 4 km away from the discharge pipe contained no detectable amounts of tritium.

On March 15, 2024, the discharge was suspended temporarily after the Fukushima coastal region experienced another 5.8-magnitude earthquake. No abnormalities were detected with the wastewater treatment.

On January 22, 2025, the Global Times, affiliated with the Chinese Communist Party's official newspaper, reported that Chinese experts had completed their own analysis of seawater samples. According to the report, no abnormalities were found in the concentrations of radioactive materials such as cesium and strontium.

On July 7, 2025, the China Atomic Energy Authority announced that an analysis by Chinese research institutions of seawater and marine life collected in February near TEPCO's Fukushima Daiichi Nuclear Power Plant confirmed no abnormalities in the concentrations of radioactive materials, including tritium.

=== Reactions ===
==== Official nuclear science panels ====
- The Japanese expert panel "ALPS subcommittee", chaired by nuclear scientist Ichiro Yamamoto, released a report in January 2020 which calculated that discharging all the water to the sea in one year would cause a radiation dose of 0.81 microsieverts to the locals, therefore it is negligible as compared to the Japanese' natural radiation of 2,100 microsieverts per year. Its calculations were verified by International Atomic Energy Agency to be correct.

==== Japanese public ====
- A panel of public policy professors argued that there was not enough research on the harmful effects of tritium, and that the government was being insincere in its consideration of alternative disposal proposals, as the proposals were always shelved after "procedural" discussion.
- A survey by Asahi Shimbun in December 2020 found, among 2,126 respondents, that 55% of Japanese opposed dumping and 86% worried about international reception. Opposition is strongest among fishers and coastal communities.
- The Fukushima Fishery Cooperatives was given written promises by TEPCO's CEO Hirose Naomi in 2015 that TEPCO would not dump the water before consulting the fishery industry. The Cooperatives felt bypassed and betrayed by the government's decision.

==== International reactions ====
Opposed to discharge

On July 8, 2023, South Koreans held a rally to condemn Japan's dumping plan, reported by CNS

- The South Korean government has been concerned since 2019 that Japan's release of radioactive water from Fukushima could be non-compliant with Article 2 of the London Protocol to protect the marine environment, but the Japanese government says the release is not applicable because it is a land-based pollution.
- In June 2020, Baskut Tuncak, United Nations's Special Rapporteur on toxics and human rights, wrote on Japan's Kyodo News that the communities of Fukushima have the right not to be exposed deliberately to additional radioactive contamination." Greenpeace and five other UN Rapporteurs (including Clément Nyaletsossi Voule) issued condemnation echoing those sentiments.
- Various governments have voiced concerns, including the governments of South Korea, North Korea, Taiwan, China, Russia, Germany, the Philippines, New Zealand, Belize, Costa Rica, Dominican Republic, El Salvador, Guatemala, Honduras, Nicaragua, Panama, and Mexico.
- In June 2021, at least 70 U.S. civic groups condemned Japan's wastewater discharge plan, and 17 civic organizations from various countries held protests in Berlin.
- In January 2023, the U.S. National Association of Marine Laboratories expressed their opposition to the plan and stated that "there was a lack of adequate and accurate scientific data supporting Japan's assertion of safety".
- In June 2023, South Korean shoppers rushed to buy up salt and other items prior to the expected release of the treated discharge. The South Korean government had banned seafood from the waters near Fukushima and says it will closely monitor the radioactivity level of salt farms. A similar salt rush occurred in China, after the discharge began.
- In the months leading up to the start of discharge, over 80 per cent of South Koreans surveyed opposed the dumping, and over 60 per cent indicated intention to avoid seafood products after the release begins.
- In August 2023, the Green Party of the United States issued a press release opposing the discharge.
- In the same month, Shaun Burnie, senior nuclear specialist for Greenpeace, accused the Japanese government and TEPCO of diverting attention away from the radiation levels in the waste water from the nuclear plant by emphasizing tritium, arguing that various other harmful radionuclides, including strontium-90, iodine, ruthenium, rhodium, antimony, tellurium, cobalt, and carbon-14, will remain present even after filtration.
- On 24 August, protests against the discharge erupted in South Korea, Hong Kong and Tokyo. According to the organisers, about 50,000 people gathered in Seoul. Some attempted to storm the Japanese embassy there.
- Japanese shops reported receiving spam calls from China, prompting the Japanese government to summon a Chinese diplomat in response. A man threw stones into a Japanese school in Qingdao, and eggs were thrown into one in Suzhou, with no confirmed damage. Social media campaigns in China called for a boycott of Japanese products. This drove a 14% single-day stock price decline for luxury cosmetics conglomerate Shiseido.
- Chinese state media outlets ran paid ads denouncing the water release on Facebook and Instagram in multiple countries and languages. Analysts labeled it part of a concerted disinformation campaign.
- The Chinese government, Hong Kong, Macau, and the South Korean government have banned aquatic imports from some or all regions of Japan.

In support of discharge

- U.S. Secretary of State Antony Blinken stated on 13 April 2021, "We thank Japan for its transparent efforts in its decision to dispose of the treated water". US Climate Envoy John Kerry expressed support.
- On 14 June 2023, Palau President Surangel Whipps Jr. expressed understanding of Japan's plan to release the treated waste water into the sea, remarking "The people who would be impacted most are their own people. [...] And if it's acceptable to their people, it should be acceptable to all of us."
- On 23 August 2023, Fijian Prime Minister Sitiveni Rabuka expressed support for the IAEA report, stating that the Japanese plan met international safety standards and most of the waste water would be discharged into Japan's "own backyard".

Mixed

- Micronesia had expressed strong opposition to Japan releasing the water. In February 2023, however, President of the Federated States of Micronesia David Panuelo said he trusted Japan's intention and capabilities but stopped short of offering full support, saying that he would continue to consult with Japan to ensure the water's safety.

IAEA report

- On 23 March 2021, Rafael Grossi, director-general of the International Atomic Energy Agency (IAEA), reached a consensus with the Japanese government three weeks before its announcement of decision to release water from the damaged power plant.
- In February 2023, Robert H. Richmond, a marine biologist consulting for the Pacific Islands Forum (PIF), expressed doubts about the data behind Japan's plan. He pointed out that whereas the PIF is focused more on people and the ocean, the IAEA "has a mandate to promote the use of nuclear energy" and "there are alternatives" to discharging the water.
- In July 2023, the IAEA released its conclusion that Japan's plans to slowly discharge the treated wastewater are in accordance with the relevant international safety standards but stopped short of endorsing the decision, which is for Japan's government to make.
- Arjun Makhijani, president of the Institute for Energy and Environmental Research, criticised the IAEA for not looking into its own safety principle of justification, that is, whether an action's benefit outweighs its cost, because the IAEA was approached to make a report after Japan had already decided to discharge the water.
- On 10 July 2023, New Zealand expressed confidence in the IAEA report.
- On 9 August 2023, during a Nuclear Non-Proliferation Treaty (NPT) committee, Australia, France, Italy, Malaysia, United Kingdom, and the United States expressed support for the IAEA report. Australia said it was "independent, impartial and science-based" and trusts it completely, the UK also said it can be trusted, and the US said the report was impartial. South Korea requested that the IAEA inspect every step of the discharging, while China said the report was insufficient and urged Japan not to proceed with its plan. Australia expressed confidence in the IAEA report again on 23 August.

Pacific Islands Forum

- In April 2021, the Pacific Islands Forum expressed deep concerns and urged Japan to rethink its decision on the discharge of the ALPS Treated Water.
- In August 2023, a panel of five independent experts consulting for the Pacific Islands Forum was split on the issue of discharge. Some had no issue with it, saying it would not harm the Pacific. Two of them said trying to obtain information from Japan was difficult and its data had "red flags". The panelists wrote that more study is needed on the contaminants inside the water tanks, that TEPCO only took small samples from a quarter of the tanks, which showed large variations in readings, and used commercial pellets, not tritium-exposed fish, as food source for its experiments. Ken Buesseler, a scientist at the Woods Hole Oceanographic Institution (WHOI), does not expect widespread direct health effects across the Pacific but said contaminants missed by ALPS could accumulate near the shore in Japan and ultimately hurt fisheries in local areas. He recommended keeping them on land instead and mixing into concrete, for example, which would have been easier to monitor.

== Environmental effects ==
=== Initial discharge ===
A large amount of caesium entered the sea from the initial atmospheric release (see above). By 2013, the concentrations of caesium-137 in the Fukushima coastal waters were around the level before the accident. However, concentrations in coastal sediments declined more slowly than in coastal waters, and the amount of caesium-137 stored in sediments most likely exceeded that in the water column by 2020. The sediments may provide a long-term source of caesium-137 in the seawater. According to Buesseler, the release of strontium-90 could be more problematic because, unlike some of the other isotopes, it gets into a person's bones.

Data on marine foods indicates their radioactive concentrations are falling toward initial levels. 41% of samples caught off the Fukushima coast in 2011 had caesium-137 concentrations above the legal limit (100 becquerels per kilogram), and this had declined to 0.05% in 2015. United States Food and Drug Administration stated in 2021 that "FDA has no evidence that radionuclides from the Fukushima incident are present in the U.S. food supply at levels that are unsafe". Yet, presenting the science alone has not helped customers to regain their trust on eating Fukushima fishery products.

=== 2023 discharge ===
The most prevalent radionuclide in the wastewater is tritium. A total of 780 terabecquerels (TBq) will be released into the ocean at a rate of 22 TBq per year. Tritium is routinely released into the ocean from operating nuclear power plants, sometimes in much greater quantities. For comparison, the La Hague nuclear processing site in France released 11,400 TBq of tritium in the year of 2018. In addition, about 60,000 TBq of tritium is produced naturally in the atmosphere each year by cosmic rays.

Other radionuclides present in the wastewater, like caesium-137, are not normally released by nuclear power plants. However, the concentrations in the treated water is minuscule relative to regulation limits.

"There is consensus among scientists that the impact on health is minuscule, still, it can't be said the risk is zero, which is what causes controversy", Michiaki Kai, a Japanese nuclear expert, told AFP. David Bailey, a physicist whose lab measures radioactivity, said that with tritium at diluted concentrations, "there is no issue with marine species, unless we see a severe decline in fish population".

Ferenc Dalnoki-Veress, a scientist-in-residence at the Middlebury Institute of International Studies at Monterey, said regarding dilution that bringing in living creatures makes the situation more complex. Robert Richmond, a biologist from the University of Hawaiʻi, told the BBC that the inadequate radiological and ecological assessment raises the concern that Japan would be unable to detect what enters the environment and "get the genie back in the bottle". Dalnoki-Veress, Richmond, and three other panelists consulting for the Pacific Islands Forum wrote that dilution may fail to account for bioaccumulation and exposure pathways that involve organically-bound tritium (OBT).

According to a 2023 nationwide public opinion poll by the Yomiuri Shimbun, 57% of respondents approved of the government beginning the ocean release of treated water from the plant, exceeding the 32% who disapproved.

== See also ==
- 2011 Tōhoku earthquake and tsunami
- Fukushima nuclear accident (2011)
- London Convention on the Prevention of Marine Pollution by Dumping of Wastes and Other Matter
- Nuclear power in Japan
