= Mingo Jack =

Black man lynched by a mob over false rape accusation in 1886

- Born: Samuel Johnson c. 1820; Colts Neck Township, New Jersey
- Died: March 5, 1886 (aged 66); Eatontown, New Jersey
- Known for: Lynching victim

Samuel "Mingo Jack" Johnson (c. 1820 – March 5, 1886) was an African American man falsely accused of rape. He was brutally beaten and hanged by a mob of white men in Eatontown, New Jersey.

== Biography ==
Johnson was born in Colts Neck in 1820 and was raised as a slave by the Laird family. Because he was short, the family used him as a jockey, and he rode a colt named Chief Mingo to victory, earning him the nickname Mingo Jack. In 1840, New Jersey abolished slavery, and Johnson worked odd jobs in the Eatontown and Middletown areas, living in Eatontown near what is now Route 35 and Poplar Road.

== Lynching ==
On Friday, March 5, 1886, a white woman, Angelina Herbert, was raped and beaten. She could not identify her attacker but reported that he had asked her, "Do you know Mingo Jack?" The town constable immediately arrested Johnson and locked him up inside the town's small brick jailhouse. Shortly before midnight, a mob of 12 to 20 men gathered outside the jail, fired a pistol through the window, and wielded a pickax and sledgehammer to break down the heavy door. The mob brutally beat and clubbed Johnson, breaking his skull and gouging out one eye before hanging him from the bars across the jailhouse window. Discovered the following day, Johnson's remains were interred in the cemetery of the African Methodist Episcopal Church of Eatontown.

A sham trial for some members of the lynch mob was held, featuring drunken witnesses and a jury that included prominent resident Thomas White, resulting in acquittals for all the defendants. Evidence from the trial, including testimony from Mrs. Herbert, revealed that Johnson could not have been the rapist. No one was convicted for the murder of Johnson, who left behind a wife and five children. Another black man, George or Richard Kearney, later confessed to the rape, although that confession may have been coerced. Kearney later was hanged for the murder of another woman.

In 2012, Mayor Gerald Tarantolo issued a public apology for the failure of security at the jail, calling the lynching "a low point in the history of Eatontown". A small memorial was placed in Wampum Park, commemorating Johnson's murder as one of the only lynchings in New Jersey state history.

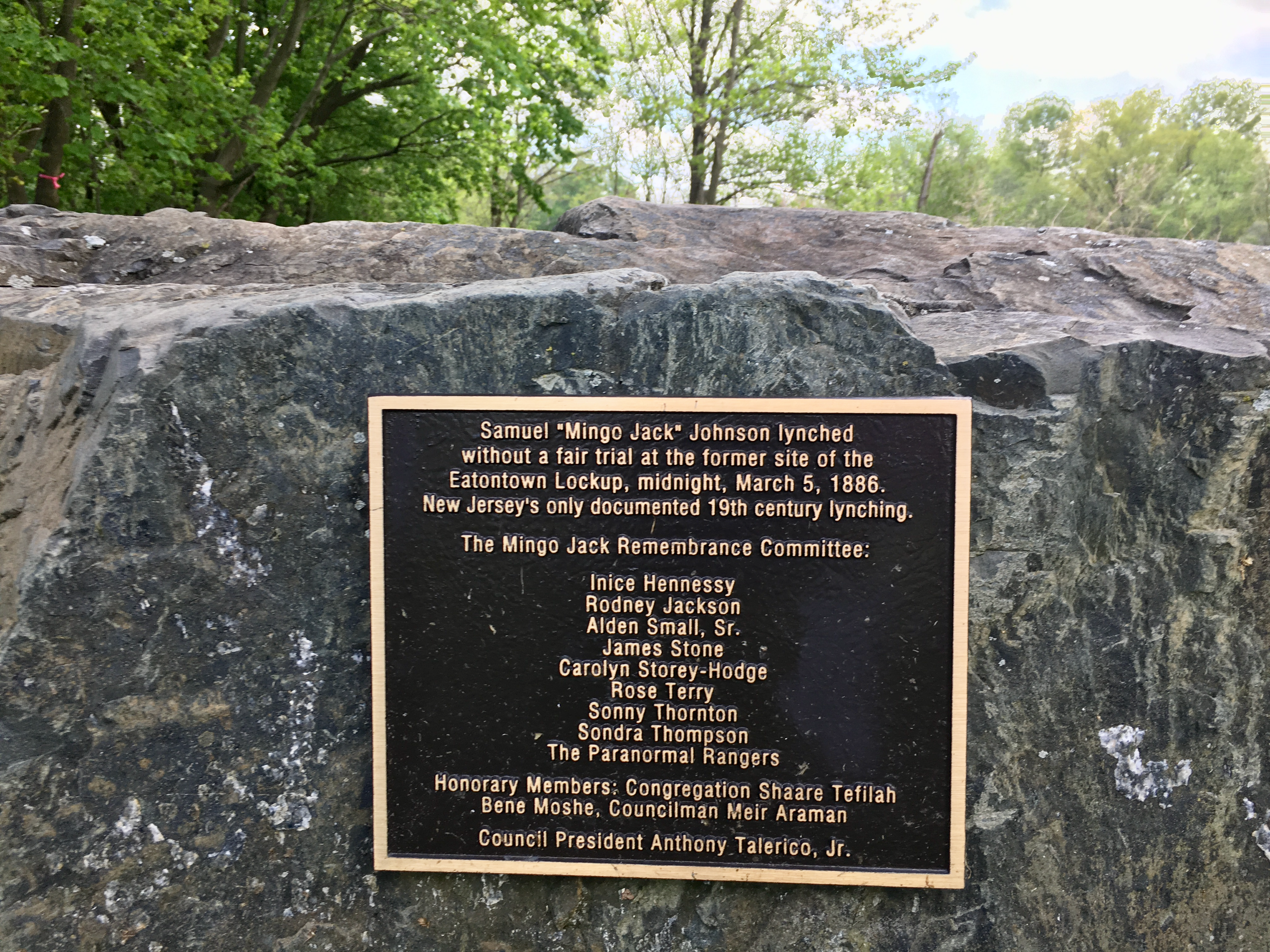
Plaque memorializing Samuel Johnson, an innocent victim of lynching, placed in Wampum Park in Eatontown, NJ. It includes the line, "New Jersey's only documented 19th century lynching."

== See also ==
- False accusations of rape as justification for lynchings
