= St. James Memorial Church of Eatontown =

Historic church in New Jersey, United States

- U.S. National Register of Historic Places
- New Jersey Register of Historic Places
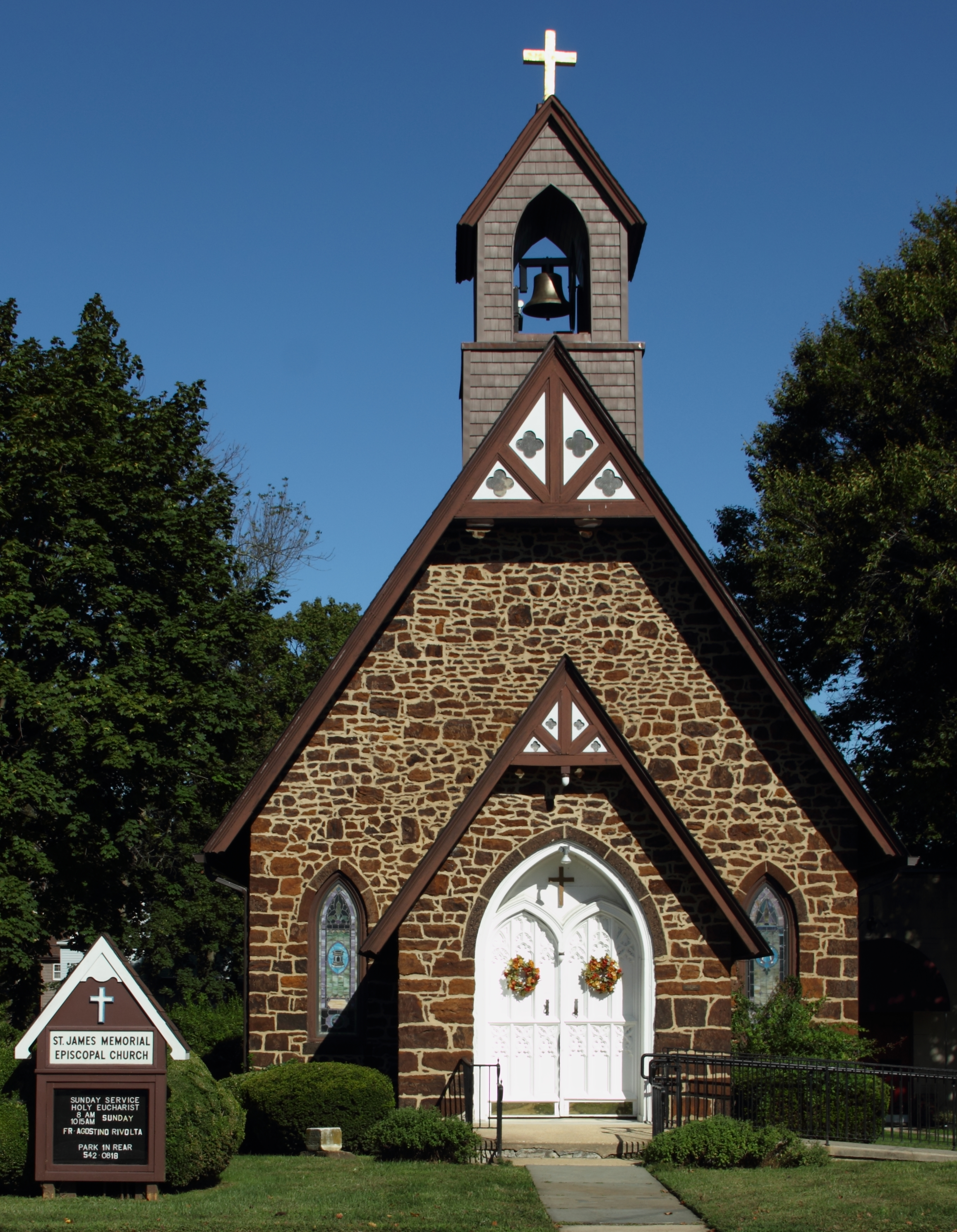

- Location within Monmouth County, New Jersey Location within New Jersey Location within the United States
- Location: 69 Broad Street, Eatontown, NJ 07724
- Coordinates: 40°18′22″N 74°3′26″W
- Area: less than one acre
- Built: 1866
- Architectural style: Gothic Revival
- NRHP reference No.: 78001775
- NJRHP No.: 1967

Significant dates
- Added to NRHP: February 17, 1978
- Designated NJRHP: April 15, 1977

St. James Memorial Church of Eatontown is a historic church at 69 Broad Street in Eatontown, Monmouth County, New Jersey, United States.

It was built in 1866 and added to the National Register of Historic Places in 1978.
