= Jean Lynch-Stieglitz =

American paleoceanographer

- Education: Columbia University
- Scientific career
- Workplaces: Georgia Institute of Technology
- Thesis: Controls on the isotopic composition of oceanic carbon and applications to paleoceanographic reconstruction (1995)

Jean Lynch-Stieglitz is an American paleoceanographer known for her research on reconstructing changes in ocean circulation over the last 100,000 years.

== Education and career ==
An interest in the natural world, combined with the logic of science and math, attracted Lynch-Stieglitz to science and after a summer at the Duke University Marine Laboratory she decided on a career in physical oceanography. In 1986, she earned B.S. degrees in physics and geology from Duke University and for two years she worked as an oceanographer at the Pacific Marine Environmental Laboratory. From 1988 until 1989 she worked at the Maryland Science Center and as a programmer at Johns Hopkins University before moving to Columbia University where she earned an M.A. (1991) and Ph.D. (1995) in geological sciences. After two years as a postdoctoral scholar at Woods Hole Oceanographic Institution, in 1996 she returned to New York where she joined the faculty of the Lamont–Doherty Earth Observatory. In 2004, Lynch-Stieglitz moved to the Georgia Institute of Technology where she was promoted to professor in 2010.

From 2012 to 2015, Lynch-Stieglitz was the Editor of Earth and Planetary Science Letters.

In 2015, Lynch-Stieglitz was elected a fellow of the American Association for the Advancement of Science "for bringing physical oceanography approaches to the study of transient circulation changes during ice ages, providing a window into the ocean’s interaction with today’s climate change."

== Research ==
Lynch-Stieglitz's research links the ocean and climate over the past 100,000 years. She has used carbon isotopes in benthic foraminifera to reconstruct air-sea exchange in carbon isotopes, changes in the movement of deep water masses, and Antarctic Intermediate Water in the transitions between glacial and interglacial periods. In the Atlantic Ocean, she has examined movement of the Gulf Stream during the Last Glacial Maximum and linked changes in the Atlantic meridional overturning circulation and to rapid changes in climate. Her research also extends to regions where ice alters the exchange of carbon dioxide between atmosphere and ocean in glacial periods, and work in the Pacific Ocean where she has examined sea surface temperatures from the Last Glacial Maximum to the present.

=== Selected publications ===
- Lynch-Stieglitz, Jean; Curry, William B.; Slowey, Niall (December 1999). "Weaker Gulf Stream in the Florida Straits during the Last Glacial Maximum". Nature. 402 (6762): 644–648. Bibcode:1999Natur.402..644L. doi:10.1038/45204. ISSN 1476-4687. S2CID 4403523.
- Lynch-Stieglitz, Jean; Stocker, Thomas F.; Broecker, Wallace S.; Fairbanks, Richard G. (1995). "The influence of air-sea exchange on the isotopic composition of oceanic carbon: Observations and modeling". Global Biogeochemical Cycles. 9 (4): 653–665. Bibcode:1995GBioC...9..653L. doi:10.1029/95GB02574. ISSN 1944-9224. S2CID 129194624.
- Lynch-Stieglitz, J.; Adkins, J. F.; Curry, W. B.; Dokken, T.; Hall, I. R.; Herguera, J. C.; Hirschi, J. J.-M.; Ivanova, E. V.; Kissel, C.; Marchal, O.; Marchitto, T. M.; McCave, I. N.; McManus, J. F.; Mulitza, S.; Ninnemann, U.; Peeters, F.; Yu, E.-F.; Zahn, R. (6 April 2007). "Atlantic Meridional Overturning Circulation During the Last Glacial Maximum". Science. 316 (5821): 66–69. Bibcode:2007Sci...316...66L. doi:10.1126/science.1137127. PMID 17412948. S2CID 44803349.

== Awards and honors ==
- Kavli Frontiers of Science Fellow, National Academy of Sciences (1998)
- Fellow, American Association for the Advancement of Science (2015)
- Cesare Emiliani Lecturer, American Geophysical Union (2018)
- Fellow, American Geophysical Union (2019)
