= Brehm Preparatory School =

Secondary school in Carbondale, Illinois, US

Location
- Carbondale, Illinois, USA; 37°43′00″N 89°11′31″W

Information
- Type: Independent co-educational Boarding School
- Established: 1982
- Executive headteacher: Richard Collins, PhD
- Campus size: 100+ acres
- Area: (320,000 m2)

Brehm Preparatory School is a not-for-profit 501 (c)(3) co-educational college preparatory day and boarding school for students with learning disabilities, founded in 1982. Brehm Preparatory School is located in Carbondale, Illinois. The school enrolls students in grades 6-12+. The average class size is eight in core content classes and 5 in learning cognition classes. Brehm's student-teacher ratio is 6:1.

== Program ==
Brehm offers course work in accordance with Illinois’ State Standards. It was recognized by the U.S. Department of Education as a Blue Ribbon School of Excellence in 1992–1993. The school is a member of the National Association of Private Special Educative Centers and the National Association of Independent Schools (NAIS). The junior and senior high school programs are accredited by the Independent Schools Association of the Central States and the North Central Association of Colleges and Schools.

Brehm uses the Arrowsmith Program.

== Governance ==
A Board of Trustees governs Brehm Preparatory School. This board consists of parents of former and current Brehm students, the Executive Leadership Team, a member of the faculty, and other interested parties.

Administrative staff include:

| Head of School | Richard Collins, PhD |
| Director of Education | Jennifer Conwell |
| Head of OPTIONS | Scott Donovan |
| Director of Admissions | Donna Collins |
| Director of Student Life | Carrie Collins |
| Recreation Coordinator | Adriana Coleman |
| Marketing Coordinator | LaNeal Nance |
| Comptroller | Carla Langan |
| Director of Operations | Tom Coffel |
| Director of Information Technology | Tom Coffel |

== School history ==
Carol Brehm founded Brehm Preparatory School in 1982. Brehm resided in Mt. Vernon, Illinois, and was the mother of Tyson Brehm, a high-school student with learning disabilities. She founded the school in order to provide a program which would meet the needs of her son and other children with learning disabilities. Carbondale was selected largely due to proximity to resources in higher education such as Southern Illinois University and John A. Logan College.

== Recreation ==
Brehm has a recreation program managed by Carrie Collins (Director of Student Life) and Adriana Coleman (Recreation Coordinator) and staffed by dedicated local college students. The recreational program is designed around tier level and staff input. Weekday activities vary and may include swimming, paintball, Art Club, flag football, Future Business Leaders of America Club, bowling, fishing, basketball, soccer, and volunteer opportunities. Weekend recreation allows for more involved activities such as hiking, trips to St. Louis sites such as the zoo, museum, water park (once or twice a year) sporting events, and Southern Illinois University sponsored events (opera, theater, ballet, lectures, and more). Individual programs offered include personal training, dance, fitness, and gymnastics.

== Dormitory life ==
Boarding students are supervised by Dorm Parents and multiple assistants. The Dorm Parent works within the boarding setting to achieve success socially and emotionally. Brehm currently utilizes five on-campus dormitories that house 12-20 students each.

== Notable alumni ==
- Mangok Mathiang (born 1992), Australian-Sudanese basketball player for Hapoel Eilat of the Israeli Basketball Premier League
