= Liati Mayk-Hai =

American poet (born 1981)

Liati N. Mayk-Hai (born 1981) is an American singer-songwriter, visual artist, poet, athlete and scholar.

== Biography ==
Liati N. Mayk-Hai is from Eatontown, in Monmouth County, New Jersey. She is the daughter of Judaic ceremonial artist, Nissan Graham-Mayk, whose porcelain "Miriam Cup" was in a ten-year exhibition at the Jewish Museum in New York City from 1992 to 2002.

Mayk-Hai is the songwriter, composer, lead singer and guitarist in the semi-eponymous band Cafe Liati based in New York. Cafe Liati's debut album, "Love Is All There Is," is a collection of 14 original folk-songs and was released in early 2004. "Love Is All There Is" was recorded as an independent project of Cafe Liati Music at Retromedia Sound Studios in Red Bank, New Jersey with the guidance of studio engineer and co-producer John Noll. Mayk-Hai is also a singer for an electronic music project called Smooth, based out of Tel Aviv, Israel. The Smooth album was released on Chicago's Real Estate Records in April 2004 and has been used on the soundtracks for such TV shows as MTV's The Real World: San Diego (Episodes 2,3, 13, 17), HBO's Six Feet Under (Season 4, Episode 43), and Fox's Nip/Tuck (Episode 2). Mayk-Hai was rumored to be working on a collaboration with Jewish folk rapper Matt Bar during 2006–7.

As a visual artist, Mayk-Hai is primarily involved with oil painting and photography. She is currently working on a series of oil paintings that depict both the urban and natural landscapes of Israel vis-à-vis Neve Tzedek, a Tel Aviv neighborhood. Her work is a fusion of impressionism and photo-realism and has been most influenced by the work of Van Gogh, Nachum Gutman and Max Ferguson.

Also a competitive athlete, Mayk-Hai played second-base and left-field for the Bronze Medal-winning Israeli Woman's National Softball team (Maccabiah; not the Olympics). The team, established in 2002, has competed in the European Championships in Saronno, Italy (2003), Prague (2005), Zagreb, Croatia (2007) and Antwerp, Belgium (2009). Mayk-Hai's sister, Shyella Mayk, one of the team's main pitchers, who is also a physical education teacher at Heritage Middle School in Livingston, New Jersey, pitched for Quinnipiac University's Division 1 Softball Team from 1996 to 2000 and was a main force in the formation of the Israeli Woman's National Softball team.

Dr. Liati Mayk-Hai is a member of the Judaic Studies faculty at Golda Och Academy in West Orange, New Jersey.
