= Hawkswood School =

Location
- 270 Industrial Way West; Eatontown, Monmouth, New Jersey 07724; United States

Information
- Type: special needs education
- Founded: 1976
- Status: active
- NCES School ID: A9104474.
- Administrator: Vincent Renda
- Principal: Andrew Orefice
- Teaching staff: 19 (full time equivalents)
- Gender: Coeducational
- Age: 3 to 21
- Enrollment: 155 (26 Jul 2014)
- Student to teacher ratio: 7.9
- Hours in school day: 5.5
- Classrooms: 22
- Campus size: 5.5
- Campus type: suburban
- Annual tuition: School districts pay all tuition and transportation
- Affiliation: National Association of Private Special Education Centers, Family Resource Association, Inc. of Monmouth County
- Website: hawkswoodschool.net

Hawkswood School (formerly the School for Children) is a private, non-sectarian school, located in Eatontown, New Jersey. The School provides educational services for students with various disabilities (such as autism) and support for their families.

Hawkswood School is owned by Hawkswood, Inc. The School is fully accredited by the state of New Jersey and a member of the National Association of Private Special Education Centers. Hawkswood School provides an array of programs from pre-kindergarten to life preparedness classes for students, ages 3 – 21. Many nearby public school districts contract with Hawkswood School to provide educational services to students who might be underserved by the public school districts.

In December 2011, New Jersey Lt. Governor Kim Guadagno visited Hawkswood School, presenting the school as an example of high-quality education for students with educational disabilities.
