= Brookfield Schools =

Location
- 1009 Berlin Road; Cherry Hill, New Jersey 08034; United States; 39.88403°N 75.013548°W

Information
- Type: Private special school
- Motto: Your Pathway Toward Success
- Established: 1976
- NCES School ID: AA890559
- Director: Patrick Kiernan
- Teaching staff: 10.0 in 8–12 (on an FTE basis)
- Grades: K–12
- Gender: Co-educational
- Enrollment: 43 in 8–12 (2017-2018)
- Student to teacher ratio: 4.3 in 8–12
- Campuses: 3
- Accreditation: NCASES
- Website: www.brookfieldschools.org

Brookfield Schools are a group of private, co-educational special schools in New Jersey, United States. It was established in 1976 and provides educational and therapeutic services for K–12 students on three sites; 9–12 Brookfield Academy in Cherry Hill, K–8 Brookfield Elementary in Haddon Heights, and a college transition program via Camden County College campus in Blackwood.

The schools use Common Core curriculum standards and testing, sports activities to build teamwork and social skills, and a collaboration with a local animal shelter to "sharpen reading skills" and socialize puppies for adoption. It is listed among New Jersey's "Approved Private Schools for Students with Disabilities." According to the Camden City Board of Education, "Brookfield Schools is a nationally recognized and highly qualified organization in providing home educational services to students in need of such services."

== History ==
Brookfield Schools was established in 1976 as Turning Point in Cherry Hill, New Jersey, for students needing therapeutic intervention. It was later known as the Camden County Alternative School and renamed to Brookfield Academy in 1998. The school then continued to expand its services and programs and is now known as Brookfield Schools, operating on three sites in New Jersey; a 9–12 Brookfield Academy in Cherry Hill, a K–8 Brookfield Elementary in Haddon Heights, and a college transition program via Camden County College campus in Blackwood.
