= Eatontown Public Schools =

School district in Monmouth County, New Jersey, US

Address
- 5 Grant Avenue Eatontown, Monmouth County, New Jersey, 07724; United States
- Coordinates: 40.306304°N 74.05034°W

District information
- Grades: PreK-8
- Superintendent: Scott T. McCue
- Business administrator: Gregory Hillman
- Schools: 4

Students and staff
- Enrollment: 1,022 (as of 2024–25)
- Faculty: 97.8 FTEs
- Student–teacher ratio: 10.5:1

Other information
- District Factor Group: FG
- Website: www.eatontown.org
Ind.	Per pupil	District spending	Rank (*)	K-8 average	%± vs. average
1A	Total Spending	$20,337	78	$18,891	7.7%
1	Budgetary Cost	15,678	73	14,159	10.7%
2	Classroom Instruction	9,583	73	8,659	10.7%
6	Support Services	2,372	57	2,167	9.5%
8	Administrative Cost	1,571	43	1,547	1.6%
10	Operations & Maintenance	1,963	76	1,612	21.8%
13	Extracurricular Activities	126	71	104	21.2%
16	Median Teacher Salary	62,064	50	61,136
Data from NJDoE 2014 Taxpayers' Guide to Education Spending. *Of K-8 districts with more than 750 students. Lowest spending=1; Highest=84

The Eatontown Public Schools is a community public school district that serves students in pre-kindergarten through eighth grade from Eatontown in Monmouth County, in the U.S. state of New Jersey. The district includes three elementary schools and a middle school.

As of the 2024–25 school year, the district, comprised of four schools, had an enrollment of 1,022 students and 97.8 classroom teachers (on an FTE basis), for a student–teacher ratio of 10.5:1.

The district had been classified by the New Jersey Department of Education as being in District Factor Group "FG", the fourth-highest of eight groupings. District Factor Groups organize districts statewide to allow comparison by common socioeconomic characteristics of the local districts. From lowest socioeconomic status to highest, the categories are A, B, CD, DE, FG, GH, I and J.

Public school students in ninth through twelfth grades attend Monmouth Regional High School, located in Tinton Falls. The high school is part of the Monmouth Regional High School District, which also serves students from Shrewsbury Township and Tinton Falls. As of the 2024–25 school year, the high school had an enrollment of 891 students and 89.9 classroom teachers (on an FTE basis), for a student–teacher ratio of 9.9:1.

== Schools ==
Schools in the district (with 2024–25 enrollment data from the National Center for Education Statistics) are:

Elementary schools

- Meadowbrook Elementary School with 212 students in grades PreK–1
  - Tiffany Boufford, principal
- Woodmere Elementary School with 235 students in grades PreK and 2–3
  - Megan Okuniewicz, principal
- Margaret L. Vetter Elementary School with 232 students in grades PreK and 4–5
  - Angela Y. Torres, principal

Middle school

- Memorial Middle School with 270 students in grades 6–8
  - Kristoffer Brogna, principal

== Administration ==
Core members of the district's administration are:

- Scott T. McCue, superintendent of schools (since the 2011–12 school year)
- Gregory Hillman, school business administrator and board secretary

== Board of education ==
The district's board of education, comprised of nine members, sets policy and oversees the fiscal and educational operation of the district through its administration. As a Type II school district, the board's trustees are elected directly by voters to serve three-year terms of office on a staggered basis, with three seats up for election each year held (since 2012) as part of the November general election. The board appoints a superintendent to oversee the district's day-to-day operations and a business administrator to supervise the business functions of the district.
