= Duke University Marine Laboratory =

Research facility and campus of Duke University on Piver's Island

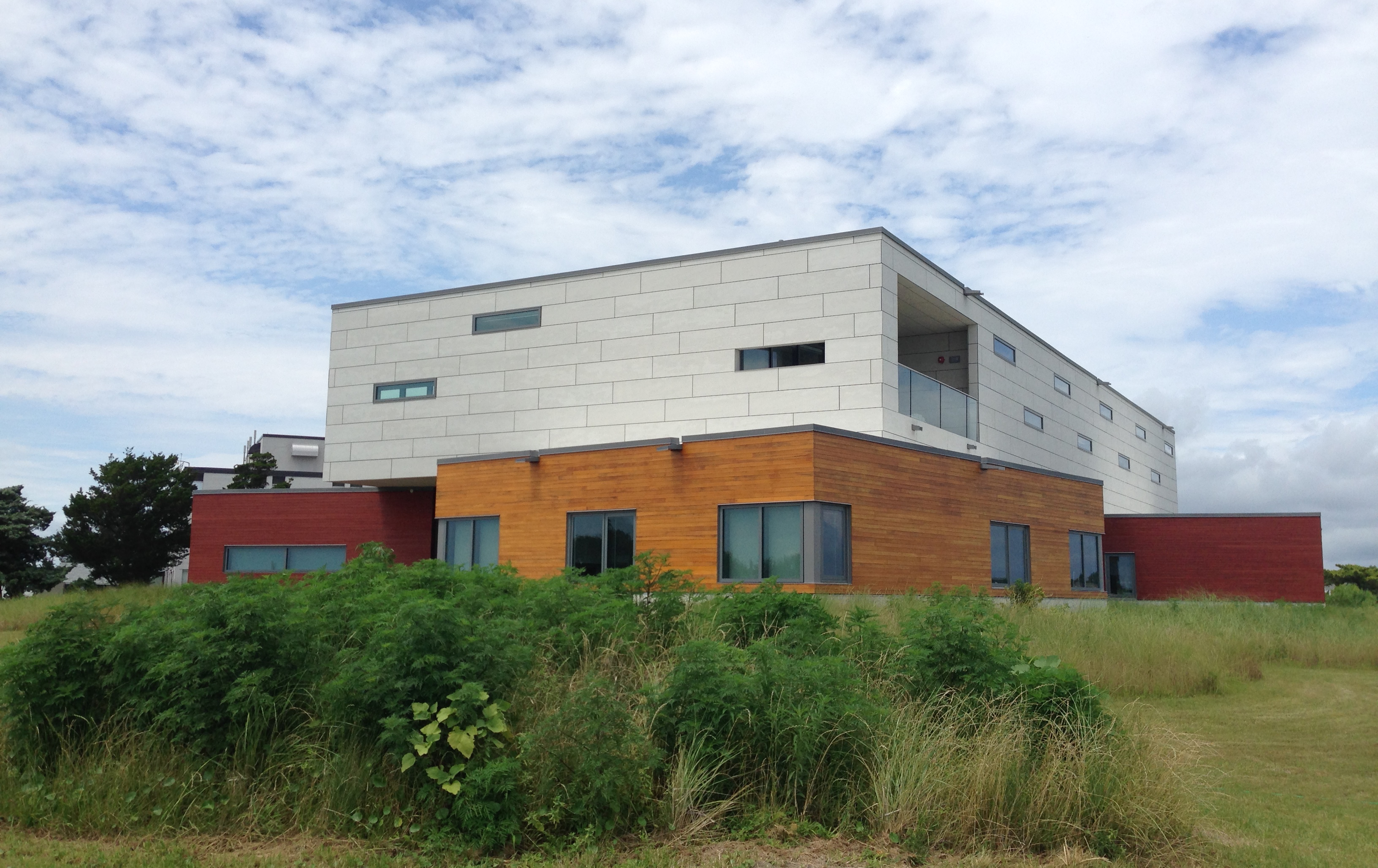
- Pilkey laboratory at the Duke Marine Lab
- Alternative names: Duke Marine Lab

General information
- Location: Piver's Island (Private), United States of America
- Opened: 1938
- Owner: Duke University

The Duke University Marine Laboratory (commonly referred to as the Duke Marine Lab) is a research facility and campus of Duke University on Piver's Island, near Beaufort and the Outer Banks, North Carolina specializing in studying marine biology. It is part of the Nicholas School of the Environment's Division of Marine Science and Conservation.

The current official goal of the Marine Laboratory is to study marine environmental systems and conservation utilizing the resources of the facility's proximity to the ocean. It is a member of the National Association of Marine Laboratories and the Marine Sciences Education Consortium.

== History ==
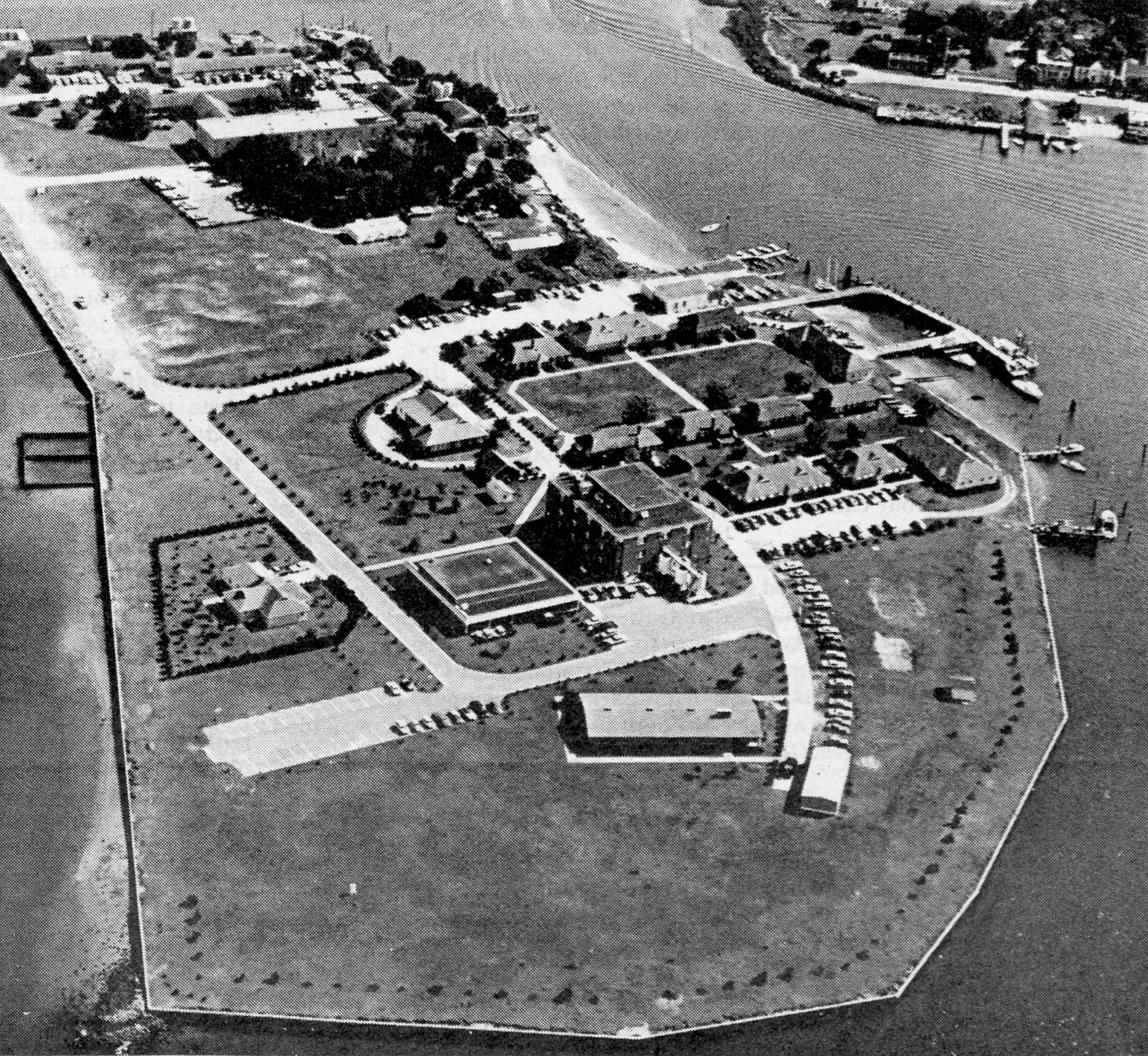
Duke Marine Lab circa 1981

The main campus of Duke University is not in close proximity to the ocean, but with the Marine Laboratory campus, the university is able to conduct hands-on oceanographic studies.

The site for the laboratory was selected in the early 1930s, with the first building completed by 1938. The original intention of the facility was to be a summer training facility and research facility for the university.

By 1963, the facility had reached national recognition for its resources. At the time 75% of students and 40% of researchers came from other universities than Duke.

Sylvia Earle, a renowned oceanographer and pioneer of Jacques Cousteau's AquaLung Scuba device, received her M.S. and Ph.D. from Duke in 1956 and 1966, and has a connection to the Marine Laboratory.

In 1990, the laboratory assumed much of the research of Fairleigh Dickinson University's West Indies Laboratory for Underwater Research in St. Croix, Virgin Islands after Hurricane Hugo damaged the St. Croix facility.

Cindy Lee Van Dover was named the first female director of the center in 2007. She has initially worked at the laboratory in the 1970s.

On June 5, 2017, the Marine Laboratory participated in a green-illumination protest with other buildings at Duke in support of the Paris Climate Accords along with similar actions at Harvard, Stanford, Yale, Columbia, and MIT.

== Facilities and ships ==
Since its inception in 1938, the campus has expanded significantly to include wet and dry laboratories as well as a fleet of research ships.

=== Land-based facilities ===
==== Research facilities ====
- "Lab 1," in continuous operation since 1938, contains running sea-water tables
- Marguerite Kent Repass Ocean Conservation Center "Green Marine Lab"
- Marine Conservation Molecular Facility (MCMF)
- Orrin Pilkey Laboratory
- Bookhout Research Laboratory
- Pearse Memorial Library and associated computer equipment
- Duke Marine Robotics and Remote Sensing Lab

==== Support facilities ====
- Dormitory Capacity for 142 persons (92 students)
- Dining Facilities
- Boathouse Lounge
- Student Center

=== Ocean vessels (former and current) ===
- The Eastward
- Cape Hatteras
- R/V Richard Barber
- R/V Kirby-Smith
- Various Skiffs
- R/V Shearwater (2020) – 77-foot catamaran funded by an $11 million gift from the Grainger Family Descendants Fund. Designed and built for year-round operations and outfitted with state-of-the-art scientific support infrastructure, it increases the scope of the research possible at the facility by expanding the duration and capacity of sea voyages.

== Partnerships ==
Duke University shares Piver's Island with the National Oceanic and Atmospheric Administration (NOAA), which has a 60,000 square foot marine laboratory. The current director of the National Laboratory is also an alum of Duke University. Duke has partnerships with other universities for marine research, such as Wittenberg University, Franklin and Marshall College, and Marquette University for use of the Marine Laboratory for students.

== Research and media coverage ==
The research originating from the laboratory has often been published in scientific journals, such as Policy Studies Journal, Ecology Letters, Marine Turtle, and Conservation Biology.

Recently, the laboratory's research about the effect of plastic on sea coral has gained national media coverage. Other notable research includes the interaction of light pollution and marine life and studies of whale migration patterns.

In 2017, the Marine Laboratory was featured in television series Xploration Station with Philippe Cousteau Jr., the grandson of oceanographer Jacques Cousteau.

== See also ==
- Stanford University's Hopkins Marine Station
- University of Hawaii's Institute of Marine Biology (HIMB)
- University of New England's Marine Biology Program
- University of New Hampshire's Marine Biology Program
- University of Tampa's Marine Biology Program
