= Eatontown, New Jersey =

Borough in Monmouth County, New Jersey, US

- Borough
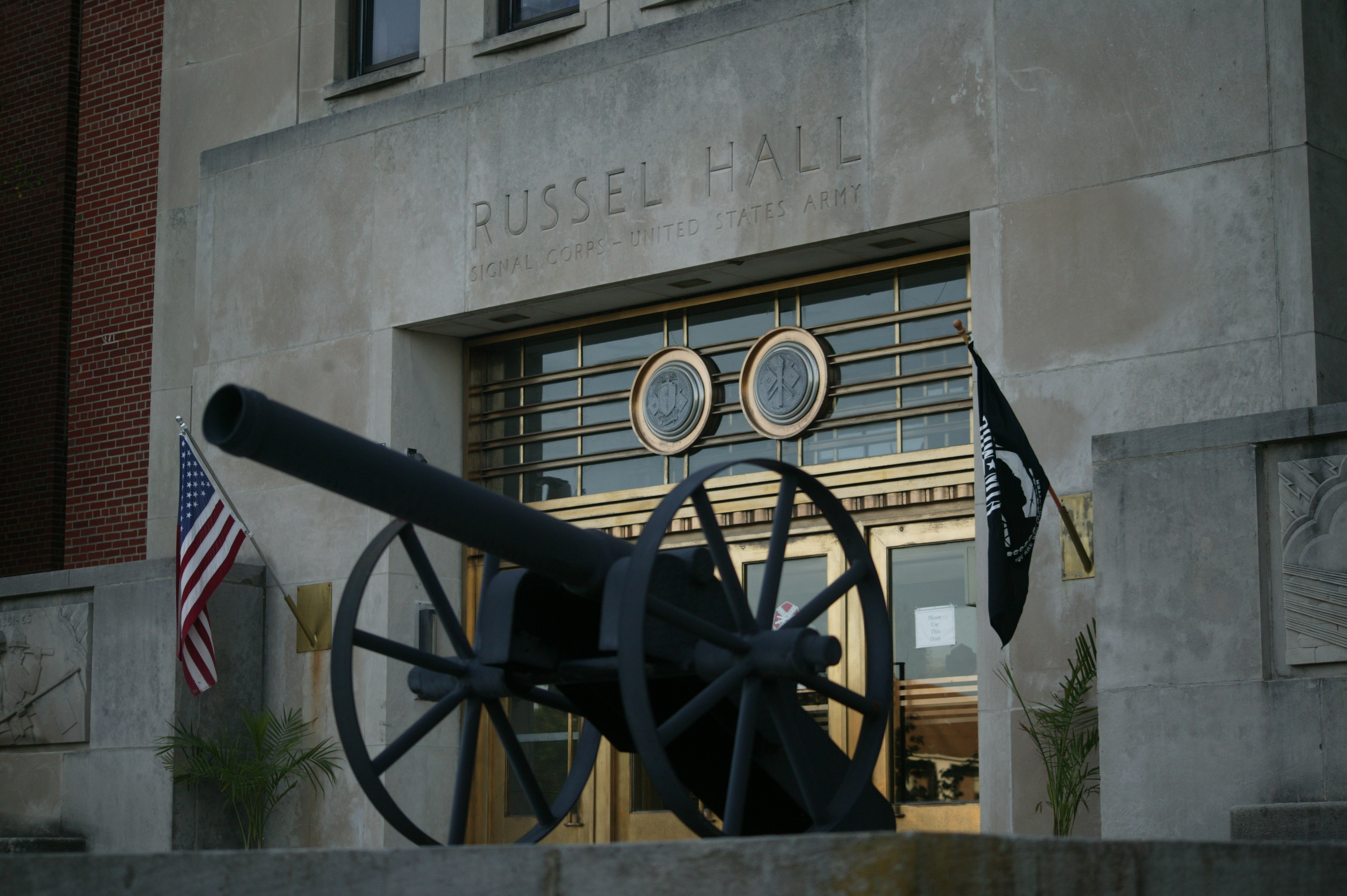
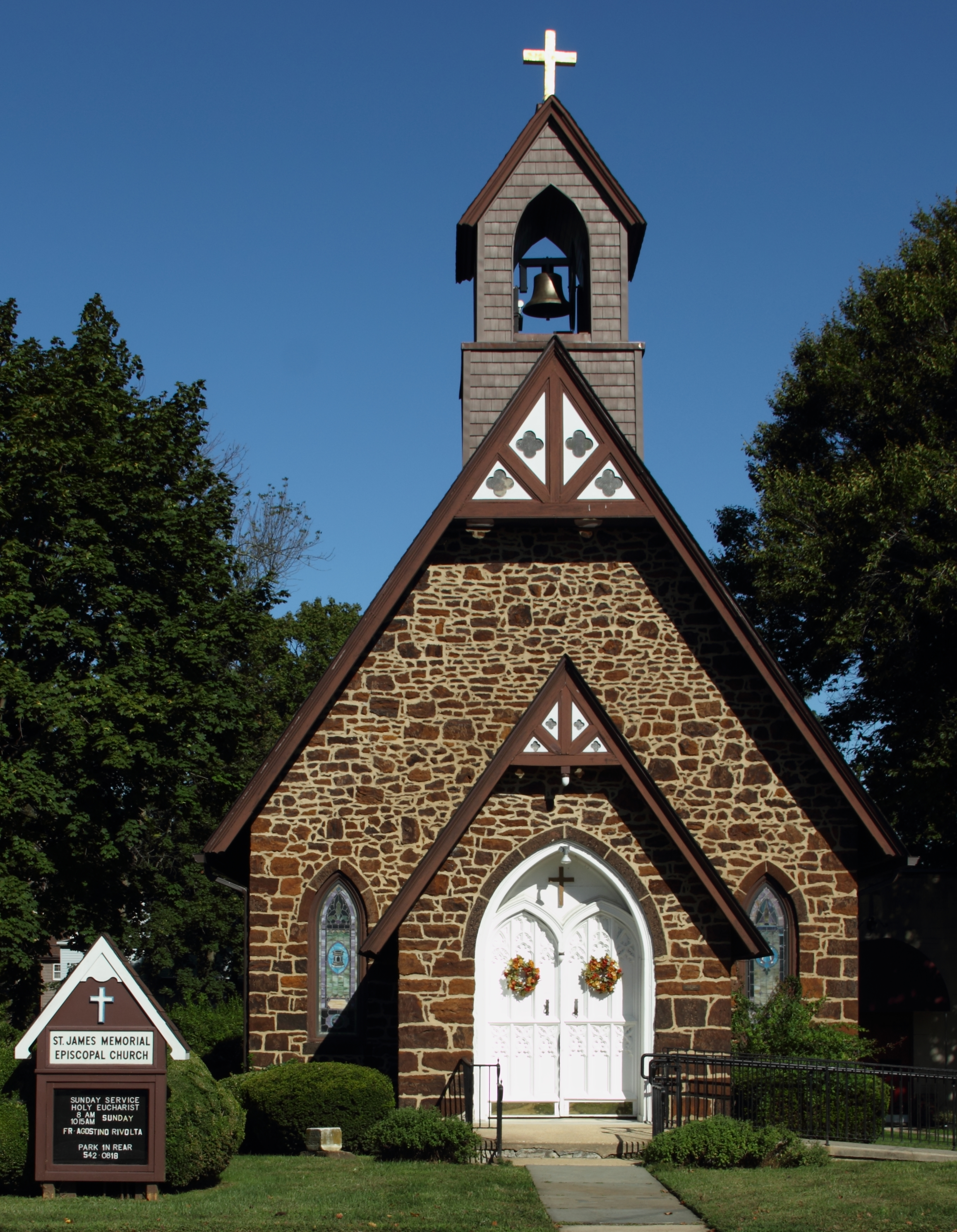
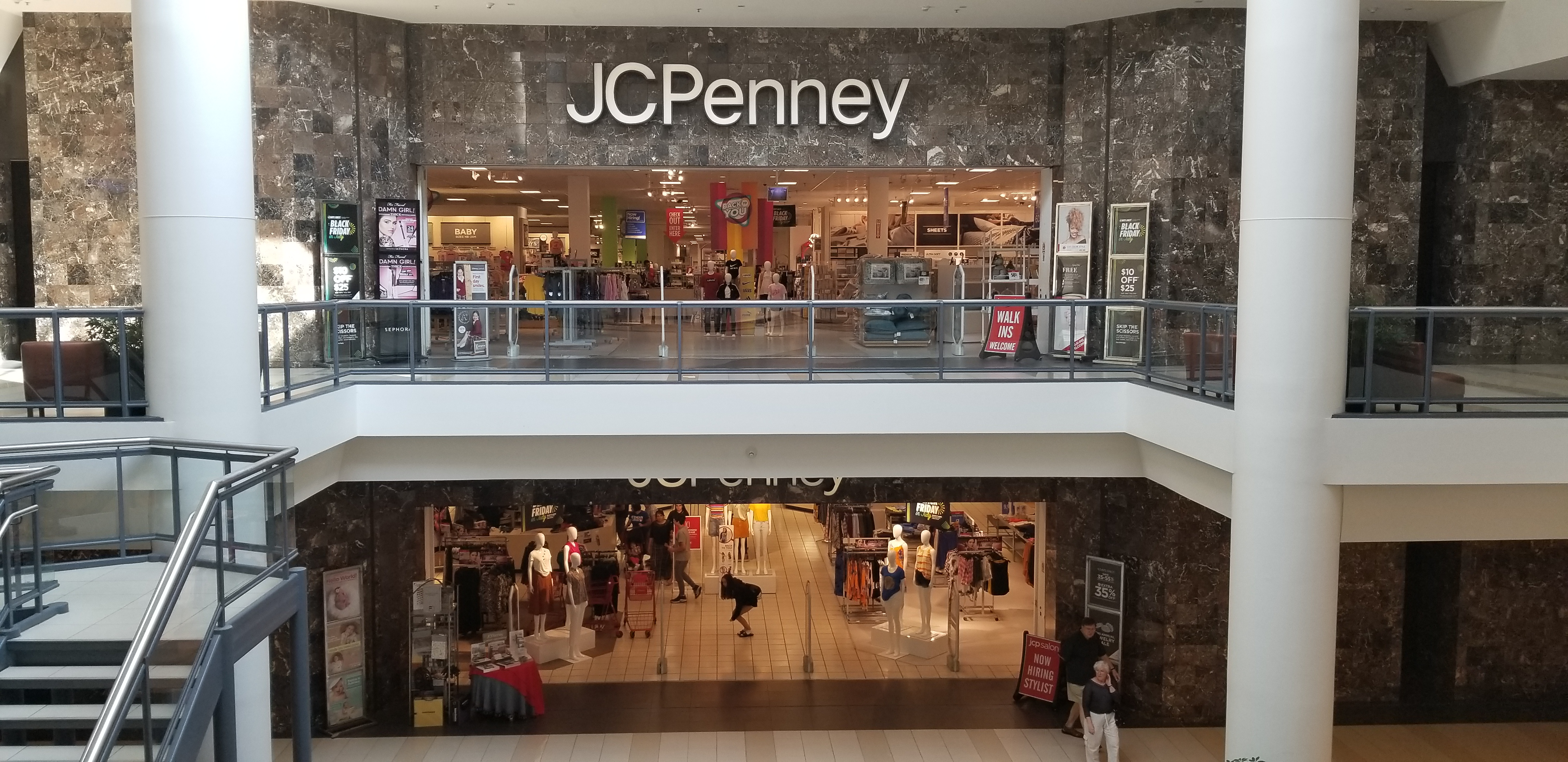
- Fort Monmouth St. James Memorial Church Monmouth Mall

- Seal

- Location of Eatontown in Monmouth County highlighted in red (left). Inset map: Location of Monmouth County in New Jersey highlighted in orange (right).

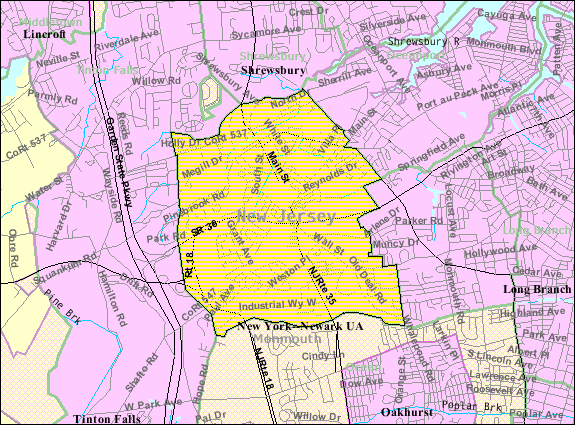
- Census Bureau map of Eatontown, New Jersey

- Location in Monmouth County Location in New Jersey Location in the United States
- Coordinates: 40.291619°N 74.054084°W
- Country: United States
- State: New Jersey
- County: Monmouth
- Incorporated: April 4, 1873 as township
- Incorporated: March 8, 1926 as borough
- Named for: Thomas Eaton

Government
  - Type: Borough
  - Body: Borough Council
  - Mayor: Anthony Talerico Jr. (D, term ends December 31, 2026)
  - Administrator: William P. Lucia III (acting)
  - Municipal clerk: Julie Martin

Area
  - Total: 5.89 sq mi (15.26 km^{2})
  - Land: 5.84 sq mi (15.13 km^{2})
  - Water: 0.050 sq mi (0.13 km^{2}) 0.87%
  - Rank: 260th of 565 in state 18th of 53 in county
- Elevation: 52 ft (16 m)

Population (2020)
  - Total: 13,597
  - Estimate (2023): 13,496
  - Rank: 190th of 565 in state 15th of 53 in county
  - Density: 2,327.9/sq mi (898.8/km^{2})
  - Rank: 266th of 565 in state 32nd of 53 in county
- Time zone: UTC−05:00 (Eastern (EST))
  - Summer (DST): UTC−04:00 (Eastern (EDT))
- ZIP Codes: 07724, 07799
- Area code: 732
- FIPS code: 3402519840
- GNIS feature ID: 0885202
- Website: www.eatontownnj.com

Eatontown is a borough in Monmouth County, in the U.S. state of New Jersey. As of the 2020 United States census, the borough's population was 13,597, an increase of 888 (+7.0%) from the 2010 census count of 12,709, which in turn reflected a decline of 1,299 (−9.3%) from the 14,008 counted in the 2000 census.

== Background ==
The community that is now Eatontown was originally incorporated as Eatontown Township by an act of the New Jersey Legislature on April 4, 1873, from portions of Ocean Township and Shrewsbury Township. Portions of the township were taken to form West Long Branch (April 7, 1908) and Oceanport (April 6, 1920). Eatontown was reincorporated as a borough on March 8, 1926, replacing Eatontown Township, based on the results of a referendum held on April 13, 1926.} The borough was named for Thomas Eaton, an early settler who built a mill in the area c. 1670.

The Fort Monmouth gate arches on Route 35, September 2025

The United States Army's Fort Monmouth operated in Eatontown from 1917 until its closure in September 2011, based on recommendations from the Base Realignment and Closure Commission. It was home to the United States Army Materiel Command's Communication and Electronics Command. Fort Monmouth was also home to the United States Military Academy Preparatory School, which trains approximately 250 students per year to enter as freshmen (plebes) at the United States Military Academy at West Point.

Netflix Studios Fort Monmouth is under construction on the site of the former military installation.

In the center of Eatontown is the Monmouth Mall, located at the intersection of Route 35 and Route 36, featuring a variety of stores, restaurants, and a 15-screen cineplex, with a gross leasable area of 1,500,000 square feet (140,000 m^{2}). Celebrity chef Bobby Flay previously owned a restaurant in Eatontown.

As of 2025, the Monmouth mall was torn down, but some stores were retained, i.e., Barnes & Noble and Macy's.

== History ==
Eatontown's history is documented in the book Eatontown and Fort Monmouth.

In 1670, Thomas Eaton (for which the town is named) surveyed the area and constructed a grist mill in present-day Wampum Lake Park.

From the book Eatontown and Fort Monmouth:

By 1796, a village had developed across from Eaton's mill, with a tannery and general store on the east side of the Red Bank Turnpike [now State Route 35]. A tavern for the New York - Philadelphia stage coach trade was built on what would become the intersection of Main and Broad Streets. A second stage coach stop was established in Mechanicsville on the ocean-bound road. This village would later be called West Long Branch.

By 1850, Eaton's village had grown to include four stores on Main Street and nearly forty homes. The Eatontown Steamboat Company built docks on Oceanport Creek to ship milled flour and other farm produce up the South Shrewsbury River to markets in New York City. Entrepreneur James P. Allaire built a four-story stone warehouse at the docks, from which he shipped his bog iron forged at the Howell Works 15 miles away.

In 1886, a mob broke into the jail and removed a black man, Samuel "Mingo Jack" Johnson, who was being held for the alleged rape of a white woman. The mob brutally beat and then hanged Johnson, the father of five. Later events show that it was extremely unlikely that Johnson was guilty of the crime. In 2012, mayor Gerald Tarantolo issued a public apology for the failure of security at the jail.

In 2020, Eatontown was to celebrate its 350th anniversary, but most of the activities were delayed due to COVID-19 concerns.

== Geography ==
According to the United States Census Bureau, the borough had a total area of 5.89 square miles (15.26 km^{2}), including 5.84 square miles (15.13 km^{2}) of land and 0.05 square miles (0.13 km^{2}) of water (0.87%).

The Unincorporated community of Locust Grove is located within the borough.

The borough borders the Monmouth County municipalities of Shrewsbury on the north, Oceanport to the northeast, West Long Branch to the east, Ocean Township to the south and Tinton Falls to the west.

== Demographics ==
Historical population
| Census | Pop. | Note | %± |
|---|---|---|---|
| 1880 | 2,642 | | — |
| 1890 | 2,953 | | 11.8% |
| 1900 | 3,021 | | 2.3% |
| 1910 | 2,076 | | −31.3% |
| 1920 | 2,682 | | 29.2% |
| 1930 | 1,938 | | −27.7% |
| 1940 | 1,758 | | −9.3% |
| 1950 | 3,044 | | 73.2% |
| 1960 | 10,334 | | 239.5% |
| 1970 | 14,619 | | 41.5% |
| 1980 | 12,703 | | −13.1% |
| 1990 | 13,800 | | 8.6% |
| 2000 | 14,008 | | 1.5% |
| 2010 | 12,709 | | −9.3% |
| 2020 | 13,597 | | 7.0% |
| 2023 (est.) | 13,496 | ▼ | −0.7% |
Population sources: 1880–1920 1880–1890; 1890–1910 1910–1930; 1940–2000 2000; 2010 2020

=== 2020 census ===
As of the 2020 census, Eatontown had a population of 13,597. The median age was 41.6 years. 17.9% of residents were under the age of 18 and 18.5% of residents were 65 years of age or older. For every 100 females there were 90.0 males, and for every 100 females age 18 and over there were 87.6 males age 18 and over.

100.0% of residents lived in urban areas, while 0.0% lived in rural areas.

There were 5,842 households in Eatontown, of which 24.7% had children under the age of 18 living in them. Of all households, 40.2% were married-couple households, 20.7% were households with a male householder and no spouse or partner present, and 32.4% were households with a female householder and no spouse or partner present. About 34.6% of all households were made up of individuals and 12.7% had someone living alone who was 65 years of age or older.

There were 6,182 housing units, of which 5.5% were vacant. The homeowner vacancy rate was 1.5% and the rental vacancy rate was 6.2%.

Racial composition as of the 2020 census
| Race | Number | Percent |
|---|---|---|
| White | 7,912 | 58.2% |
| Black or African American | 1,748 | 12.9% |
| American Indian and Alaska Native | 81 | 0.6% |
| Asian | 1,325 | 9.7% |
| Native Hawaiian and Other Pacific Islander | 5 | 0.0% |
| Some other race | 1,032 | 7.6% |
| Two or more races | 1,494 | 11.0% |
| Hispanic or Latino (of any race) | 2,005 | 14.7% |

=== 2010 census ===
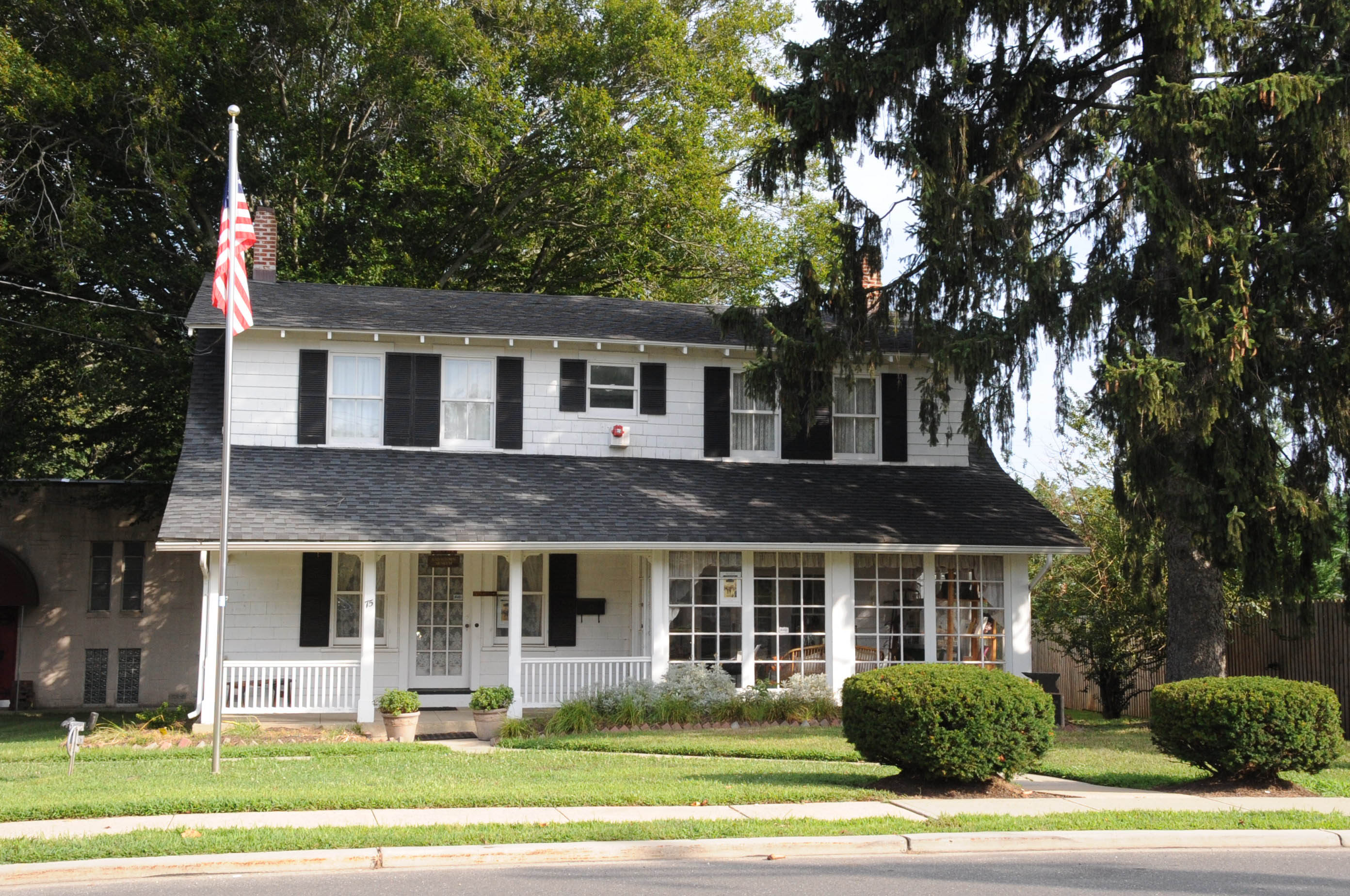
Colonial-era home, headquarters of Eatontown Historical Society

The 2010 United States census counted 12,709 people, 5,319 households, and 3,138 families in the borough. The population density was 2,181.5 per square mile (842.3/km^{2}). There were 5,723 housing units at an average density of 982.3 per square mile (379.3/km^{2}). The racial makeup was 71.29% (9,060) White, 12.41% (1,577) Black or African American, 0.28% (36) Native American, 8.67% (1,102) Asian, 0.09% (11) Pacific Islander, 3.64% (463) from other races, and 3.62% (460) from two or more races. Hispanic or Latino of any race were 12.36% (1,571) of the population.

Of the 5,319 households, 26.3% had children under the age of 18; 41.2% were married couples living together; 13.4% had a female householder with no husband present and 41.0% were non-families. Of all households, 34.2% were made up of individuals and 11.6% had someone living alone who was 65 years of age or older. The average household size was 2.32 and the average family size was 3.02.

20.7% of the population were under the age of 18, 9.3% from 18 to 24, 27.5% from 25 to 44, 28.5% from 45 to 64, and 14.0% who were 65 years of age or older. The median age was 39.6 years. For every 100 females, the population had 97.2 males. For every 100 females ages 18 and older there were 93.4 males.

The Census Bureau's 2006–2010 American Community Survey showed that (in 2010 inflation-adjusted dollars) median household income was $60,188 (with a margin of error of +/− $8,468) and the median family income was $77,846 (+/− $8,290). Males had a median income of $56,086 (+/− $7,155) versus $43,750 (+/− $5,817) for females. The per capita income for the borough was $35,200 (+/− $2,933). About 6.4% of families and 9.1% of the population were below the poverty line, including 12.7% of those under age 18 and 5.4% of those age 65 or over.

=== 2000 census ===
As of the 2000 United States census there were 14,008 people, 5,780 households, and 3,444 families residing in the borough. The population density was 2,366.8 inhabitants per square mile (913.8/km^{2}). There were 6,341 housing units at an average density of 1,071.4 per square mile (413.7/km^{2}). The racial makeup of the borough was 73.29% White, 11.61% African American, 0.34% Native American, 9.32% Asian, 0.04% Pacific Islander, 2.31% from other races, and 3.10% from two or more races. Hispanic or Latino of any race were 6.62% of the population.

There were 5,780 households, out of which 28.7% had children under the age of 18 living with them, 46.8% were married couples living together, 9.9% had a female householder with no husband present, and 40.4% were non-families. 33.8% of all households were made up of individuals, and 10.0% had someone living alone who was 65 years of age or older. The average household size was 2.35 and the average family size was 3.08.

In the borough the population was spread out, with 22.9% under the age of 18, 7.0% from 18 to 24, 35.0% from 25 to 44, 21.7% from 45 to 64, and 13.3% who were 65 years of age or older. The median age was 37 years. For every 100 females, there were 94.7 males. For every 100 females age 18 and over, there were 91.2 males.

The median income for a household in the borough was $53,833, and the median income for a family was $69,397. Males had a median income of $49,508 versus $35,109 for females. The per capita income for the borough was $26,965. About 3.5% of families and 5.7% of the population were below the poverty line, including 4.3% of those under age 18 and 9.2% of those age 65 or over.

== Government ==
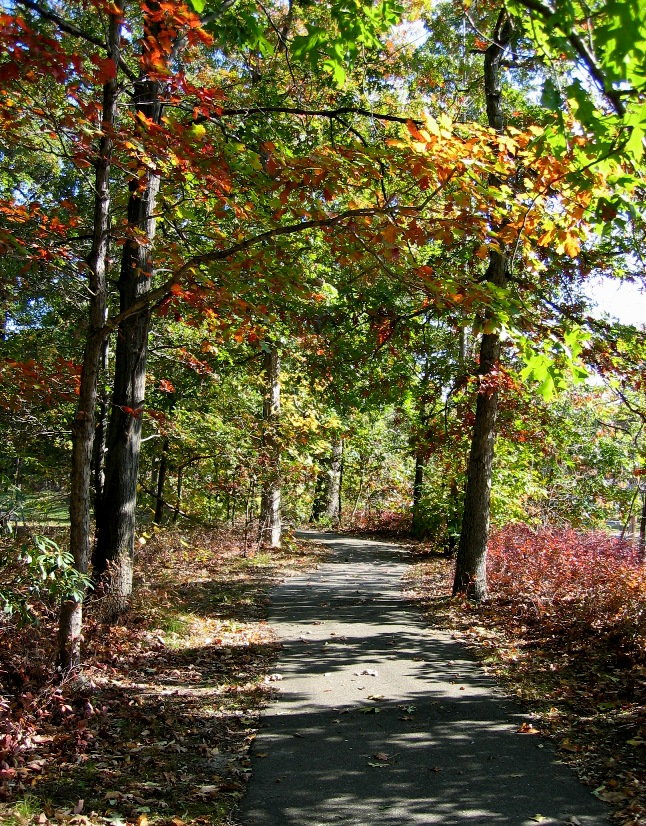
Leon Smock 80 Acre Park

=== Local government ===
Eatontown is governed under the borough form of New Jersey municipal government, one of 218 municipalities (of the 564) statewide that use this form, the most commonly used form of government in the state. The governing body is comprised of the mayor and the borough council, with all positions elected at-large on a partisan basis as part of the November general election. The mayor is elected directly by the voters to a four-year term of office. The borough council includes six members elected to serve three-year terms on a staggered basis, with two seats coming up for election each year in a three-year cycle. The borough form of government used by Eatontown is a "weak mayor / strong council" government in which council members act as the legislative body with the mayor presiding at meetings and voting only in the event of a tie. The mayor can veto ordinances subject to an override by a two-thirds majority vote of the council. The mayor makes committee and liaison assignments for council members, and most appointments are made by the mayor with the advice and consent of the council.

As of 2025, the mayor of Eatontown is Democrat Anthony Talerico Jr., whose term of office ends on December 31, 2026. Members of the Borough Council are Council President Virginia M. East (D, 2025), Meir Araman (D, 2025), Candace Faust (D, 2026), Maria Grazia Escalante (R, 2024), Danielle M. Jones (D, 2026) and Carl Lawson (D, 2027).

Jackie Severinsen was appointed to fill the seat expiring in December 2024 that became vacant following the death of Everett D. Lucas in July 2023. Severinsen served on an interim basis until the November 2023 general election, when Carl Lawson was elected to serve the remainder of the term of office.

In January 2019, Democrat Tonya Rivera was selected from a list of three candidates nominated by the Eatontown Democratic committee to fill the seat expiring in December 2020 that had been held by Bridget Harris until she resigned from office the previous month; Rivera served until the November 2019 general election, when voters chose a candidate to fill the balance of the term of office. In April 2019, the Democratic municipal committee selected Gregory Loxton to fill the seat expiring in December 2021 that had been held by Lisa Murphy until she resigned from office in March 2019; Loxton also served until the November 2019 general election, when voters chose a candidate to fill the balance of the term of office. In the November 2019 general election, Republicans were elected to fill the two full three-year terms, a single two-year unexpired term (Joseph Olsavsky) and two one-year unexpired terms (Edwin Palenzuela and Mark Regan). The three members elected to unexpired terms took office in November after the results were certified; Palenzuela stepped down from office in December and was replaced in January 2020 by Hope Corcoran.

=== Federal and state representation ===
Eatontown is located in New Jersey's 4th congressional district and is part of New Jersey's 11th state legislative district.

New Jersey is represented in the United States Senate by Democrats Cory Booker (Newark, term ends 2027) and Andy Kim (Moorestown, term ends 2031). For the 119th United States Congress, New Jersey's 4th congressional district is represented by Chris Smith (R, Manchester Township).

For the 2026–2027 session, the 11th legislative district of the New Jersey Legislature is represented in the New Jersey Senate by Vin Gopal (D, Long Branch) and in the General Assembly by Margie Donlon (D, Ocean Township) and Luanne Peterpaul (D, Long Branch).

Monmouth County is governed by a Board of County Commissioners composed of five members who are elected at-large to serve three-year terms of office on a staggered basis, with either one or two seats up for election each year as part of the November general election. At an annual reorganization meeting held in the beginning of January, the board selects one of its members to serve as director and another as deputy director.

As of 2026, Monmouth County's Commissioners are Director Thomas A. Arnone (R, Neptune City, 2028),Deputy Director Nick DiRocco (R, Wall Township, 2028), Susan M. Kiley (R, Hazlet Township, 2027), Erik Anderson (R, Shrewsbury, 2026), and Ross F. Licitra (R, Marlboro Township, 2026).

Constitutional officers elected on a countywide basis are Clerk Christine Giordano Hanlon (R, 2030; Ocean Township), Sheriff Shaun Golden (R, 2028; Howell Township) and Surrogate Maureen Raisch (R, 2026; Middletown Township).

=== Politics ===
United States presidential election results for Eatontown
| Year | Republican | | Democratic | | Third party(ies) | |
| Year | No. | % | No. | % | No. | % |
|---|---|---|---|---|---|---|
| 2024 | 3,125 | 49.88% | 3,027 | 48.32% | 113 | 1.80% |
| 2020 | 3,073 | 45.57% | 3,573 | 52.98% | 98 | 1.45% |
| 2016 | 2,669 | 47.28% | 2,754 | 48.79% | 222 | 3.93% |
| 2012 | 2,344 | 44.18% | 2,887 | 54.42% | 74 | 1.39% |
| 2008 | 2,603 | 45.75% | 3,021 | 53.10% | 65 | 1.14% |
| 2004 | 2,846 | 50.44% | 2,738 | 48.53% | 58 | 1.03% |
| 2000 | 2,138 | 43.18% | 2,581 | 52.13% | 232 | 4.69% |
| 1996 | 1,738 | 38.11% | 2,393 | 52.47% | 430 | 9.43% |
| 1992 | 2,054 | 41.48% | 1,996 | 40.31% | 902 | 18.21% |

As of March 2011, there was a total of 7,669 registered voters in Eatontown, of whom 2,037 (26.6%) were registered as Democrats, 1,490 (19.4%) were registered as Republicans and 4,140 (54.0%) were registered as Unaffiliated. There were 2 voters registered as Libertarians or Greens.

Gubernatorial election results for Eatontown
| Year | Republican | | Democratic | | Third party(ies) | |
| Year | No. | % | No. | % | No. | % |
|---|---|---|---|---|---|---|
| 2025 | 2,228 | 45.92% | 2,586 | 53.30% | 38 | 0.78% |
| 2021 | 2,086 | 53.76% | 1,740 | 44.85% | 54 | 1.39% |
| 2017 | 1,717 | 52.13% | 1,504 | 45.66% | 73 | 2.22% |
| 2013 | 2,038 | 66.82% | 966 | 31.67% | 46 | 1.51% |
| 2009 | 2,163 | 58.87% | 1,235 | 33.61% | 276 | 7.51% |
| 2005 | 1,729 | 48.92% | 1,644 | 46.52% | 161 | 4.56% |

In the 2012 presidential election, Democrat Barack Obama received 54.4% of the vote (2,887 cast), ahead of Republican Mitt Romney with 44.2% (2,344 votes), and other candidates with 1.4% (74 votes), among the 5,349 ballots cast by the borough's 8,184 registered voters (44 ballots were spoiled), for a turnout of 65.4%.

In the 2013 gubernatorial election, Republican Chris Christie received 66.8% of the vote (2,038 cast), ahead of Democrat Barbara Buono with 31.7% (966 votes), and other candidates with 1.5% (46 votes), among the 3,089 ballots cast by the borough's 8,281 registered voters (39 ballots were spoiled), for a turnout of 37.3%.

United States Senate election results for Eatontown1
| Year | Republican | | Democratic | | Third party(ies) | |
| Year | No. | % | No. | % | No. | % |
|---|---|---|---|---|---|---|
| 2024 | 2,901 | 48.58% | 2,943 | 49.29% | 127 | 2.13% |
| 2018 | 2,171 | 48.59% | 2,083 | 46.62% | 214 | 4.79% |
| 2012 | 2,303 | 45.77% | 2,626 | 52.19% | 103 | 2.05% |
| 2006 | 1,699 | 49.36% | 1,656 | 48.11% | 87 | 2.53% |

United States Senate election results for Eatontown2
| Year | Republican | | Democratic | | Third party(ies) | |
| Year | No. | % | No. | % | No. | % |
|---|---|---|---|---|---|---|
| 2020 | 2,984 | 45.33% | 3,475 | 52.79% | 124 | 1.88% |
| 2014 | 1,442 | 49.25% | 1,427 | 48.74% | 59 | 2.02% |
| 2013 | 952 | 48.15% | 1,003 | 50.73% | 22 | 1.11% |
| 2008 | 2,480 | 46.77% | 2,680 | 50.55% | 142 | 2.68% |

== Education ==
Students in public school for pre-kindergarten through eighth grade attend the Eatontown Public Schools. The district includes three elementary schools and a middle school. As of the 2024–25 school year, the district, comprised of four schools, had an enrollment of 1,022 students and 97.8 classroom teachers (on an FTE basis), for a student–teacher ratio of 10.5:1. Schools in the district (with 2024–25 enrollment data from the National Center for Education Statistics) are Meadowbrook Elementary School with 212 students in grades PreK–1, Woodmere Elementary School with 235 students in grades PreK and 2–3, Margaret L. Vetter Elementary School with 232 students in grades PreK and 4–5 and Memorial Middle School with 270 students in grades 6–8.

Public school students in ninth through twelfth grades attend Monmouth Regional High School, located in Tinton Falls. The high school is part of the Monmouth Regional High School District, which also serves students from Shrewsbury Township and Tinton Falls. As of the 2024–25 school year, the high school had an enrollment of 891 students and 89.9 classroom teachers (on an FTE basis), for a student–teacher ratio of 9.9:1. Seats on the nine-member board of education for the high school district are allocated based on the population of the constituent municipalities, with three seats allocated to Eatontown.

Eatontown is also home to Hawkswood School, a school founded in 1976 that serves the educational needs of disabled students in the area "with complex, multiple disabilities, including autism".

== Transportation ==
=== Roads and highways ===
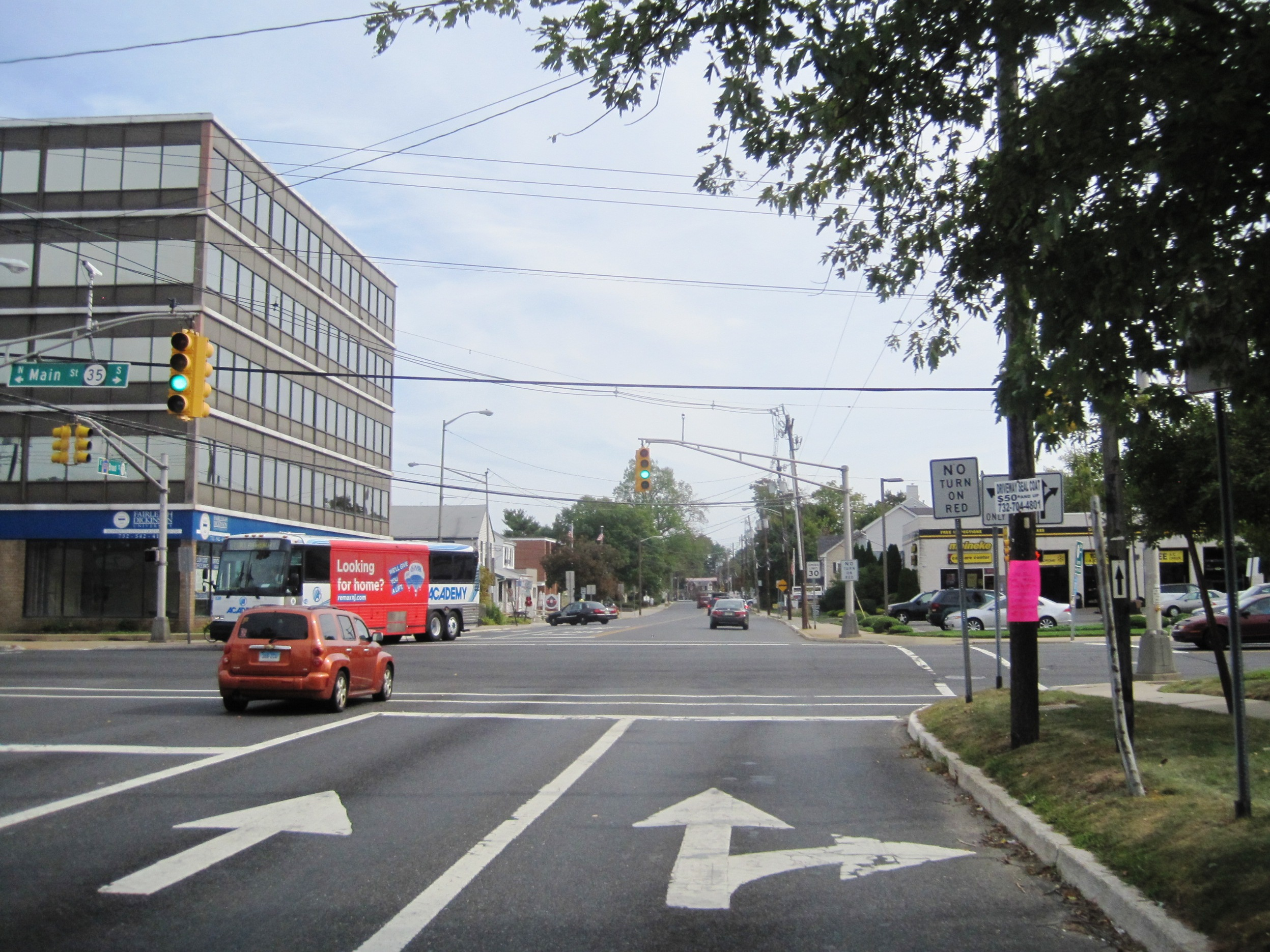
Downtown Eatontown at Main Street (Route 35) and Broad Street (Route 71/County Route 537)

As of May 2010, the borough had a total of 50.45 miles (81.19 km) of roadways, of which 36.84 miles (59.29 km) were maintained by the municipality, 5.82 miles (9.37 km) by Monmouth County and 7.79 miles (12.54 km) by the New Jersey Department of Transportation.

Several state highways pass through Eatontown. These include Route 18 in the southwestern part of the borough, Route 35 and Route 36 in the center of the borough, and Route 71 in the north. Major county roads that pass through Eatontown include County Route 537 and County Route 547.

The Garden State Parkway, the largest highway in Monmouth County, is accessible just outside the borough in neighboring Tinton Falls at exit 105.

=== Public transportation ===
NJ Transit provides local bus transportation on the 831 and 832 routes.

=== Complete Streets ===
Created in May 2018, the goal of the Eatontown Complete Streets Advisory Committee is to establish a walkable and bikeable community that is safe and accessible for people of all ages and abilities.

== Notable people ==
People who were born in, residents of, or otherwise closely associated with Eatontown include:

- Preet Bharara (born 1968), former United States Attorney for the Southern District of New York
- Charles W. Billings (1866–1928), politician and competitive shooter who was a member of the 1912 Summer Olympics American trapshooting team that won the gold medal in team clay pigeons
- Joe Bravo (born 1971), thoroughbred horse racing jockey
- Herm Edwards (born 1954), football analyst and former NFL head coach
- June Elvidge (1893–1965), film actress
- Houston Fields (1861–1899), sheriff of Monmouth County
- Liati Mayk-Hai (born 1981) singer-songwriter, visual artist, poet and athlete
- Samuel "Mingo Jack" Johnson (1820–1886), former slave, jockey and lynching victim
- Melissa Reeves (born 1967), actress who has played the role of Jennifer Horton on Days of Our Lives since 1985
- Kevin Ritz (born 1965), former MLB pitcher who played for the Detroit Tigers and Colorado Rockies
- Cindy Lee Van Dover (born 1954), oceanographer, who also studies biodiversity, biogeochemistry, conservation biology, ecology and marine science
- Anthony M. Villane (1929–2022), dentist and politician, who served in the New Jersey General Assembly from 1976 to 1988
- Peter Vredenburgh Jr. (1837–1864), lawyer and Union Army major
