= National Commission for the Accreditation of Special Education Services =

Accrediting agency for private special education services

- Nickname: NCASES
- Formation: 1992
- Type: Non-profit corporation
- Headquarters: 200 Massachusetts Ave, NW; Suite 700; Washington, District of Columbia; 20004
- NCASES Commissioners Chair: Rachel Tait
- Website: http://www.ncases.org/home.html

The National Commission for the Accreditation of Special Education Services (NCASES) is a subsidiary of the National Association of Private Special Education Centers established in the United States in 1993. NCASES provides an accreditation process and standards "to ensure that students in private special education are provided safe and healthy work environments that are conducive to learning". NCASES accreditation standards "are designed to differentiate superior quality from mere adequacy".

== Purpose ==
Noting that NCAES evaluates institutions based on 30 core standards, and a total of 187 standards, The Record of Hackensack, New Jersey, wrote:

NCASES was established in response to a need for private special education providers to have an accreditation process that effectively and systematically evaluates private special education programs. It is an accreditation process that welcomes diversity and recognizes the importance of evaluating services based on their own purpose, objectives, and ability to meet the needs of the population they serve... Each program is evaluated, and accreditation attained, based solely on its ability to meet NCASES standards.

— The Record

== Process ==
Dustin Holt of The Record Observer in Easton, Maryland wrote, "NCASES evaluates private special education programs through a process that encourages diversity of educational practice and innovation. The process assures students in private special education settings are provided environments that are healthy, safe, comfortable and conducive to learning."

The Hartford Courant described the process of a site visit:

A-three member site survey team from NCASES visited the Vista campus for three days and interviewed students, board members, community members, employers, counselors, job coaches, parents and staff. Vista was evaluated on more than 250 standards ranging from its mission and goals to accountability, governing body, staff qualifications and student services.

— Hartford Courant
