= National Association of Marine Laboratories =

American non-profit scientific organization

The National Association of Marine Laboratories (NAML) is a non-profit organization incorporated in the Commonwealth of Massachusetts to stimulate research and promote education in the marine sciences. The mission of NAML and its three regional organizations is to promote excellence in research, education, and public outreach in the marine sciences. NAML also seeks to provide a forum for the resolution of challenges common to non-profit marine laboratories in the United States and to inform the wise use and conservation of marine and coastal resources.

== Regional structure ==
The National Association of Marine Laboratories consists of three regional organizations, which have their own separate but similar articles of organization and bylaws. The three regional organizations are: the Northeastern Association of Marine & Great Lakes Laboratories (NEAMGLL), the Southern Association of Marine Laboratories (SAML), and the Western Association of Marine Laboratories (WAML). Laboratories located on the Great Lakes are here defined as marine laboratories and are eligible for membership in NEAMGLL and NAML.

NAML membership can include marine laboratories operated by state, university, and other non-profit organizations in the United States, Bermuda, Puerto Rico, the U.S. Virgin Islands and Guam. Marine laboratories are defined as those shore-based laboratory facilities directly accessing the marine environment or Great Lakes or other facilities or academic entities that are partially or primarily focused on marine research, education, or outreach.

The regional organizations have two classes of members, regular members and associate members. Regular members of each regional organization automatically belong to NAML upon payment of annual dues, election by the NAML Board of Directors, and ultimate ratification by the NAML membership at a regular meeting. Associate members of the regional organizations are those laboratories and non-profit organizations that do not wish to participate in the national organization. Associate members belong only to the regional organization and are not eligible for membership in NAML. It is the intent that the NAML would represent the regional organizations on matters that cannot be resolved at the regional level and matters of mutual interest that should be presented by NAML in behalf of all regional organizations on the national level.

Typically there is an annual meeting of the NAML membership in Washington, DC. Annual regional meetings occur either associated with the national meeting or at other times throughout the year.

== History ==
In 1984, a Federal Agency program that provided funding support for marine laboratory instrumentation was terminated. Dr. John Costlow, Director of the Duke University Marine Laboratory organized a meeting of marine lab directors to formulate testimony and present a unified position as to the importance of this program and the fiscal need to have the program reinstated. At this meeting, the necessity for a national association of marine lab directors was realized. However, that organization failed to materialize from this meeting.

== Public policy ==
NAML provides its members with robust education and outreach on issues of public policy. It publishes its priorities in public policy with input from members. Monthly briefings from its advocacy company, Federal Science Partners LLC, provide NAML members a forum to understand the latest developments in issues relevant to marine and Great Lakes laboratories. Through its Public Policy Committee, NAML communicates the association's concerns to government entities.

== Education ==
The purpose of the NAML Education Committee is to assess the experiences and education program content and the structures that define excellence in marine science education at NAML member institutions in undergraduate and graduate programs. NAML hosts educational webinars a number of times each year, allowing members to engage with educational topics special to marine and Great Lakes laboratories. More informal "community of practice calls" are held on topics such as internships, educational resources, and field safety.
