= Wash's Restaurant =

Restaurant in New Jersey

Coordinates: 39.361679°N 74.430956°W

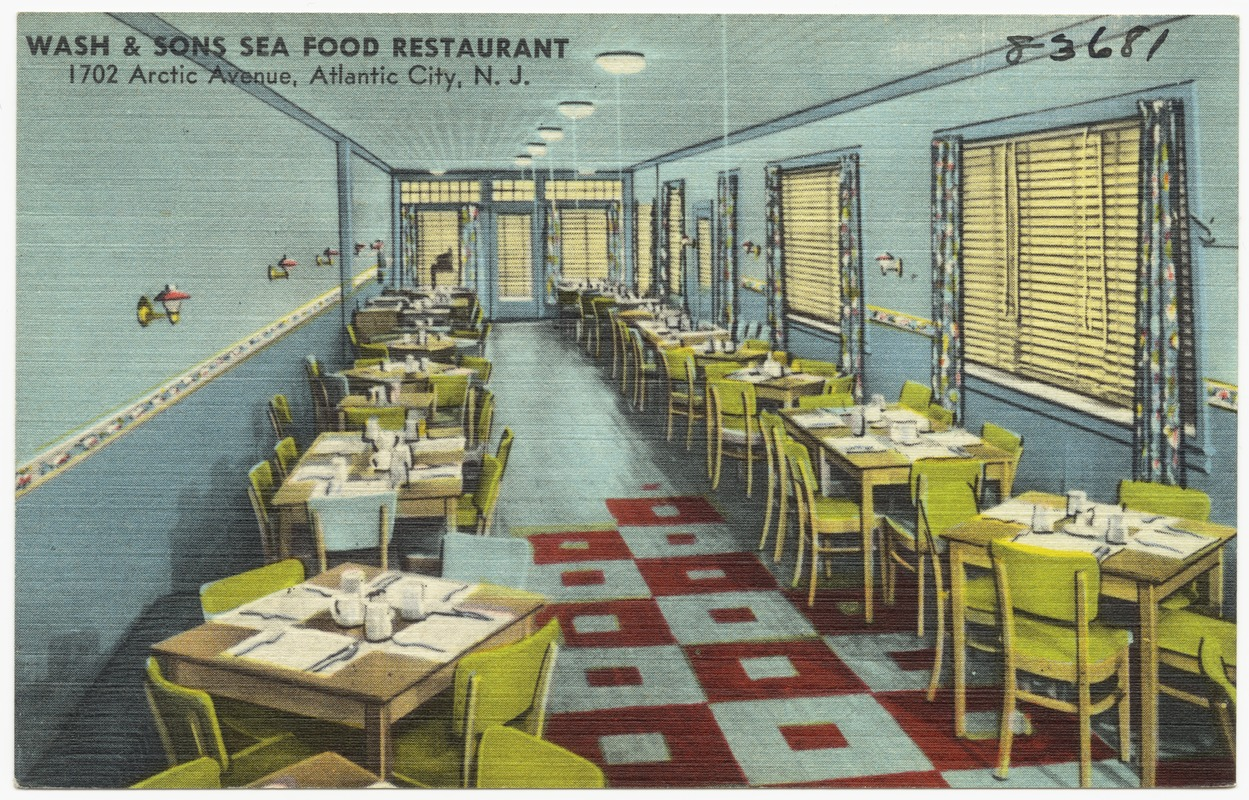
- Wash & Sons' Seafood Restaurant
- Interactive map of Wash's Restaurant

Restaurant information
- Established: 1937
- Closed: 2012
- Previous owners: Clifton and Alma Washington
- Food type: Soul food
- Location: 35 N. Kentucky Avenue, Atlantic City, New Jersey, United States
- Seating capacity: 20
- Other locations: 1702 Arctic Avenue, Atlantic City, New Jersey; 128 N. New Road, Pleasantville, New Jersey

Wash's Restaurant, later called Wash & Sons' Seafood Restaurant, Wash's Inn, and Wash's Catering, was an African-American family-owned and operated soul food restaurant that was in business for over 70 years, first in Atlantic City and then in Pleasantville, New Jersey. Established by Clifton and Alma Washington at 35 N. Kentucky Avenue, Atlantic City, in 1937, the original 20-seat location attained celebrity status for hosting the performers and patrons of the nightclubs in the Kentucky Avenue black entertainment district. The restaurant was known for its sausage sandwiches and soul food, and also served breakfast to customers leaving the 6 a.m. show at Club Harlem.

In the 1950s Clifton Washington moved the restaurant a few blocks away to 1702 Arctic Avenue, where it was renamed Wash & Sons' Seafood Restaurant and specialized in seafood, barbecued ribs, and fried chicken. This larger venue, seating over 100, continued to attract both black and white nightclub guests and was also popular with black hotel employees leaving their shifts. Washington's children and grandchildren all worked in the restaurant from a young age, and those who married into the family were also put to work.

With the commercial downturn in Atlantic City in the late 1960s and early 1970s, Wash's relocated to 128 N. New Road in Pleasantville in 1974. Renamed Wash's Inn and Wash's Catering, the business now focused on catering on-site events and also operated a small dining room, take-out deli, and bar. With the 1994 addition of a large catering hall, the facility hosted hundreds of private parties and community events. The family put the business up for sale in 2010 and closed it in 2012.

== History ==
=== Kentucky Avenue ===
Wash's Restaurant was founded by Clifton and Alma Washington, who moved from Virginia to Atlantic City in 1925 shortly after their marriage. The young couple moved into Atlantic City's Northside, home to black families in the racially segregated city since World War I, and raised seven children. In 1937 they decided to enter the restaurant business and opened Wash's Restaurant at 35 N. Kentucky Avenue. The restaurant's name was a short form of the family name Washington. The family name came from Clifton's early-19th-century ancestor, a slave in Dinwiddie County, Virginia, who changed his surname to Washington after his emancipation.

While Clifton operated a jitney, Alma managed the sandwich shop in the mornings and was assisted by her sons after school and on weekends. Alma prepared most of the food on-site. The restaurant began by selling sausage sandwiches, hot dogs, five-cent milkshakes, one-cent cigarettes, and candy. Breakfast fare of bacon and eggs was served to guests leaving Club Harlem's 6 a.m. show. Soul food entrees were added after customers saw Alma preparing beef stew or chicken and dumplings for her family and asked if they could buy that too.

Though it had only six tables, with maximum seating for 20, the restaurant became a popular venue for the entertainers and guests attending the Kentucky Avenue nightclubs, including Club Harlem, the Paradise Club, and Grace's Little Belmont. Among the entertainers who ate at the restaurant after their sets ended were Redd Foxx, Nipsey Russell, Count Basie, Sammy Davis Jr., and Moms Mabley. In the 1950s Washington's sons broke an outside wall to create a take-out window for fried chicken and seafood meals.

=== Arctic Avenue ===
When you marry a Washington, you marry a restaurant. Everybody worked two jobs. They'd work their regular job and then they'd work here on the weekends.

— Jean Washington Griffin

By the 1950s the business had outgrown its space. The Washingtons rented a larger location with an industrial kitchen a few blocks away at 1702 Arctic Avenue. The restaurant was renamed Wash & Sons' Seafood Restaurant and sported large picture windows; the interior had a seashell motif, flower boxes, and placemats with beach scenes. Industrial ceiling fans cooled off the dining area. By the summer of 1953 the new restaurant had been completely renovated and could seat more than 100 customers. Soul food specialties included seafood, barbecued ribs, fried chicken, and sweet potato pie, as well as a full breakfast menu including bacon, sausage, eggs, pancakes, grits, and home fries.

Washington's children and grandchildren all worked in the restaurant from a young age, and those who married into the family were also put to work. The standard pay for family members was $35 a week; they could make another $100 or more per week in tips, especially during the night shifts. During the summer tourist season, Raheem recalled:

The adult males would work their permanent eight-hour day jobs and arrive at the restaurant in time to eat dinner before the extremely busy night shift. The adult females would run the day shift as cooks, cashiers and hostesses, then return home in the evening to tend to their houses and children. Other family, friends and neighbors worked as pantry help, busboys, dishwashers, waiters and waitresses.

By day the restaurant hosted families and tourists before they spent the day at the beach or boardwalk. By night it welcomed the nightclub set, including free-spending parties of 15 to 20, and was also popular with black hotel employees after their shifts. It was a favorite of black and white customers alike.

The restaurant weathered a downturn beginning in the late 1960s, when many black-owned businesses in Atlantic City were closing. It closed in 1974.

=== Pleasantville ===
Between the Atlantic City and Pleasantville locations, Wash's probably employed at least one person from every black family in A.C. and became an unofficial social services agency by doing so. It was sometimes called the "black Cheers" — where everybody knew your name.

— Turiya S.A. Raheem

Wash's reopened as a restaurant, bar, and catering facility in Pleasantville, New Jersey, in 1970. Renamed Wash's Inn, it primarily focused on catering in-house dinners and parties, and also had a take-out deli. The catering menu featured the same soul food offerings as the Atlantic City restaurant – seafood, barbecued ribs, and fried chicken. As the Washington family continued to expand, sons- and daughters-in-law were enlisted to work on nights and weekends.

In 1994 the site underwent renovations, adding a 3,800-square-foot (350 m^{2}) catering hall. This hall went on to host "[h]undreds of birthday parties, wedding receptions, family reunions, repasts, anniversary parties, baby showers, weddings, bridal showers, even political rallies, jazz and theatre performances". It also hosted Quinceañeras and Latino music and dance performances, and served as a community center for "concerts, poetry readings, scholarship luncheons, dance recitals, political fundraisers and rallies".

Between 2002 and 2012 four homicides were committed on the restaurant's premises, including a November 2007 shooting, a May 2009 early-morning killing, and a January 2012 fatal beating.

== Closure ==
In June 2010 the five partners in the business, four of them descendants of the original owners, put the business up for sale with an asking price of $800,000. In November 2012 the family closed the restaurant for good.

== Legacy ==
In 2009 Turiya S.A. Raheem, a granddaughter of Clifton and Alma Washington, published a memoir of the family business titled Growing Up in the Other Atlantic City: Wash's and the Northside.

== See also ==
- Kentucky Avenue Renaissance Festival
- List of soul food restaurants

== Sources ==
- Hervieux, Linda (2015). Forgotten: The Untold Story of D-Day's Black Heroes, at Home and at War. HarperCollins. ISBN 978-0062313812.
- Raheem, Turiya S.A. (2009). Growing Up in the Other Atlantic City: Wash's and the Northside. Xlibris Corporation. ISBN 978-1450007566.
- Simon, Bryant (2004). Boardwalk of Dreams: Atlantic City and the Fate of Urban America. Oxford University Press. ISBN 0195167538.
- Willis, Cheryl M. (2016). Tappin' at the Apollo: The African American Female Tap Dance Duo Salt and Pepper. McFarland. ISBN 978-1-4766-2315-3.
