= Elvera Sanchez =

American dancer and the mother of Sammy Davis Jr. (1905–2000)

Elvera Sánchez
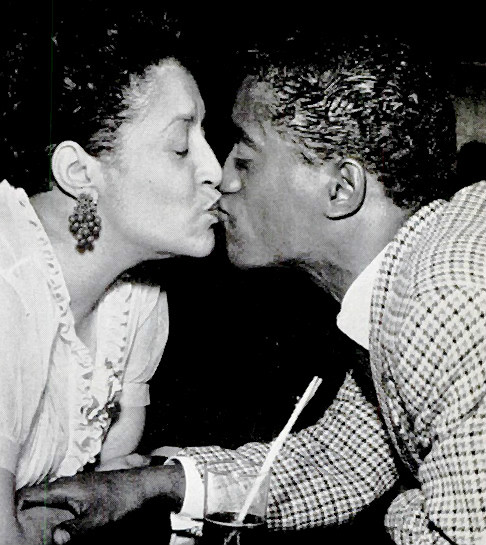
- Sánchez with her son, Sammy Davis Jr., at Grace's Little Belmont, 1954
- Born: September 1, 1905; New York City, U.S.
- Died: September 3, 2000 (aged 95); New York City, U.S.
- Spouse: Sammy Davis Sr. (m. 1923; div. 1928)
- Children: 2, including Sammy Davis Jr.

Elvera "Baby" Sánchez Davis (September 1, 1905 – September 3, 2000) was an American dancer and the mother of Sammy Davis Jr.

Davis Jr. stated that his mother was Puerto Rican and born in San Juan; however, in the 2003 biography In Black and White, author Wil Haygood wrote that Davis' mother was born in New York City, of Afro-Cuban descent, and that Davis claimed she was Puerto Rican because he feared anti-Cuban backlash would hurt his record sales.

== Life and career ==
Elvera Sánchez was born in New York City to Cuban immigrants Luisa Valentina Aguiar (14 February 1884 – 5 October 1996), who was a living centenarian at the time of Sammy Jr.'s death and would attain supercentenarian status in 1994, and Marco Sánchez (1852–1908), a cigar maker. She began her career as a chorus-line dancer at the Lafayette Theater in Harlem, in 1921. She became known as "Baby Sánchez", and married Sammy Davis Sr., also a dancer, in 1923. In 1925, their son and only child, Sammy Davis Jr., was born. He would often accompany his mother and father to the theater. When Sammy Jr. was three, his parents split up and his father obtained sole custody of him, taking him on the road. Sánchez was a chorus-line dancer at the Apollo Theater for six years and appeared in Oscar Micheaux’s 1938 film Swing. She continued to dance until the 1940s.

After retiring from her show business career at the age of 35, she began working as a barmaid for Grace's Little Belmont in Atlantic City, New Jersey. She enjoyed telling jokes to customers and was known for sporting a gold napkin. Her connections with entertainers Count Basie, Billy Eckstine, and Sarah Vaughan drew these and other celebrities to her station, and her son Sammy would come to visit after performing across town at the 500 Club "and delighted everyone, pouring drinks and singing". Frank Sinatra's valet George Jacobs recalled in his memoirs that Sinatra also liked to drop by Grace's Little Belmont in the early morning hours after his shows at the 500 Club to say hello to Davis' mother behind the bar.

From 1989, until her death in 2000 (two days after her 95th birthday), she was an adviser to the New York Committee to Celebrate National Tap Dance Day. She was also survived by a daughter, Ramona.

== Personal life ==
Sánchez was Catholic and raised Sammy Jr. as such.

== Sources ==
- Fishgall, Gary (2010). Gonna Do Great Things: The Life of Sammy Davis, Jr. Simon & Schuster. ISBN 978-1-4391-3157-2.
- Haygood, Will (2014). In Black and White: The Life of Sammy Davis Junior. Knopf Doubleday Publishing Group. ISBN 978-0804172523.
- Jacobs, George; Stadiem, William (2003). Mr. S: My Life with Frank Sinatra. John Wiley & Sons. ISBN 0786259183.
