= Wonder Gardens =

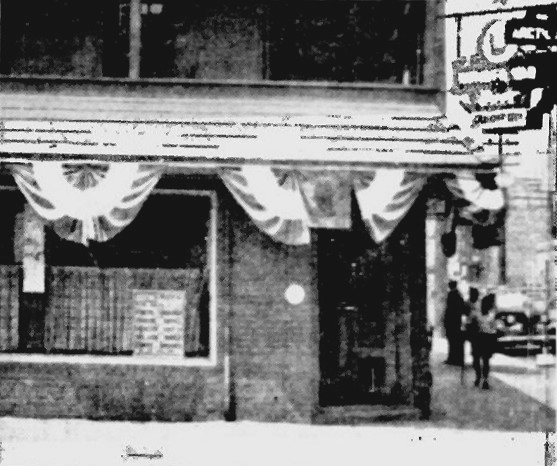
- Wonder Bar, 1940

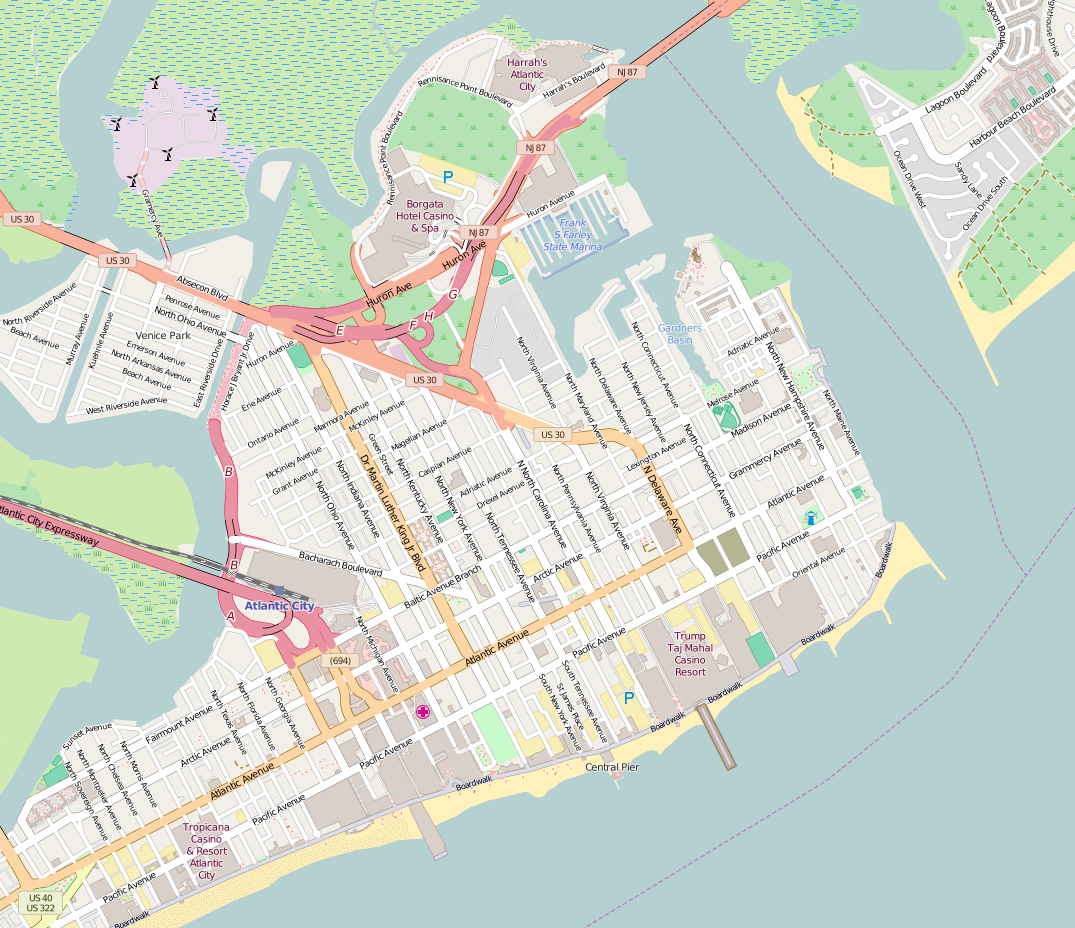
- Location in Atlantic City
- Former names: Wonder Bar
- Address: 1601 Arctic Avenue; Atlantic City, New Jersey; United States
- Coordinates: 39°21′44″N 74°25′54″W
- Owner: Charles Randall, B.B. King
- Type: Nightclub

Construction
- Opened: c. 1929
- Closed: 2001

Wonder Gardens (also known as Wonder Bar) was a jazz and R&B nightclub at 1601 Arctic Avenue in Atlantic City, New Jersey. Established around 1929, it was one of four black-owned nightclubs in the black entertainment district on Kentucky Avenue. Between the Wonder Gardens, Club Harlem, the Paradise Club, and Grace's Little Belmont, the music played all night and into the morning in the district's heyday in the 1940s through 1960s. Presenting both popular jazz musicians and new talent, the Wonder Gardens provided early exposure for Dan Fogel, Harvey Mason, George Benson, and the Commodores. Over the years, the music changed from jazz to rock, soul, and pop music. In 1979 the club was renovated, redecorated and renamed the Latin Wonder Gardens, featuring live Afro-Cuban musical entertainment. In 1991 it underwent a second renovation and name change to the New Wonder Gardens, featuring Latin, jazz, R&B, hiphop, and reggae acts. The club was sold in 2001 and was later demolished.

== History ==
Originally called Wonder Bar, the jazz nightspot opened around 1929 at 1601 Arctic Avenue, on the northwest corner of Kentucky Avenue and Arctic Avenue. In the 1940s and 1950s it was owned by Charles Randall. At one point B.B. King, a frequent performer at Club Harlem, became a part-owner of the Wonder Gardens and began appearing here exclusively two weekends a year.

In July 1940 the Wonder Bar, Club Harlem, the Paradise Club, and Grace's Little Belmont were raided by police, led by the newly elected mayor, Tom Taggart, seeking proof of illegal gambling activities. The police confiscated "three truckloads of gambling paraphernalia" and arrested 32, then shut down the four clubs. (Note: Taggart began the action by calling 40 policemen into his office, strapping on a revolver and stating, "Come on, we're going places.") The arrestees from the Wonder Bar included Randall, John Doyle, and Albert Leighton, who all pleaded not guilty and were released on bail. The next day the clubs were open for business as usual. (Note: The mayor conducted a second raid two weeks later of the Wonder Bar, Little Belmont and Club Harlem. This raid found no gambling equipment or patrons at any of these clubs. Upon raiding the establishments and finding nothing, Taggart's comment was, "I heard these wise guys were going to try to open up again.") The raid followed a period of unease between the new mayor and black citizens of Atlantic City's north side; earlier, Taggart had filed a restraining order against a white dancer, who bathed in milk during her performance, from appearing at Randall's black club.

In 1979 the Wonder Gardens was renovated and redecorated as a Latin disco, with a new sound system, and renamed the Latin Wonder Gardens. Featuring Afro-Cuban musical entertainment, the club announced that Joe Cuba would be the house band; opening acts included Típica 73, Vitín Avilés, and Mayro & Silvio's Cuban Rumba Dancers. In 1991 the club underwent a second renovation and name change to the New Wonder Gardens, now offering Latin, jazz, R&B, hip hop, and reggae music. The 2000 edition of Lonely Planet's New York City listed the Wonder Gardens as a jazz club in its Atlantic City excursions section. Dancer LeRoy Myers purchased the club in the 1970s and sold it in 2001.

== Performers ==
Throughout its history, the Wonder Gardens presented both popular musicians and new talent. In the late 1950s Dan Fogel began hanging around the Kentucky Avenue clubs regularly at the age of 10, shining shoes and listening in on top jazz organists like Groove Holmes, Larry Young, Jimmy Smith, and Jimmy McGriff playing the Hammond B3 organ at the Wonder Gardens and Club Harlem. With his shoeshine earnings, Fogel bought a Hammond organ at age 11 and at age 13 debuted at the Wonder Gardens. At age 16 Fogel was leading the Wonder Gardens house band, which included his Atlantic City High School classmate Harvey Mason on drums. Mason recalled that the band regularly played the "breakfast show" at the Wonder Gardens from 4 AM to 10 AM in the 1960s.

In the 1960s, the Wonder Gardens booked jazz organists Brother Jack McDuff and Gene Ludwig, drummers Art Blakey and J. C. Heard, the John Banks Trio, Damita Jo, Kenny Barron and Dizzy Gillespie, tenor saxophonist Bootsie Barnes, R&B/soul group The Delfonics, and singers Marvin Gaye, Russell Thompkins Jr., and Florence Ballard, formerly of The Supremes. In the mid-1960s, a young George Benson, then known as "Little Georgie", played guitar in McDuff's trio at the Wonder Gardens. After his set ended at 3 AM Benson would walk over to Grace's Little Belmont to talk music with future jazz composer Charles Earland.

In the 1970s the club began presenting rock, soul, and pop musicians. Performers included Stevie Wonder, James Brown, Aretha Franklin, Kool and the Gang, and Blue Magic. The aspiring Commodores played as the house band one summer. Joseph Smith, a black Baltimore high school student, was also given some time on stage with his magic and ventriloquist act.

In the early 1990s, the club featured jazz keyboardist Lonnie Liston Smith and drummer Ralph Peterson, Jr. on its weekly jazz night from 5 PM to 2 AM. The club also gave the stage to up-and-coming singer Sybil and Boyz II Men, while aspiring DJ Ahmed Kahn spun R&B and rap music.

== See also ==
- Kentucky Avenue Renaissance Festival

== Sources ==
- Benjaminson, Peter (2008). The Lost Supreme: The Life of Dreamgirl Florence Ballard. Chicago Review Press. ISBN 978-1556527050.
- Ellis, David (2000). New York City (2nd ed.). Lonely Planet. ISBN 1864501804.
- Lyons, Terri (2009). Take It From The Top. Xlibris Corporation. ISBN 978-1462820528.
- Willis, John; Hodges, Ben (2006). Theatre World, Volume 60. Hal Leonard Corporation. ISBN 978-1-5578-3650-2.
