= Kentucky Avenue Renaissance Festival =

- Status: Active
- Genre: Street fair
- Date: August
- Frequency: Annually
- Locations: Kentucky Avenue, Atlantic City, New Jersey, US
- Inaugurated: June 1992
- Most recent: 2016
- Major events: Live musicians and bands; Dance performances; Arts and crafts for children; Food concessions

Kentucky Avenue Renaissance Festival, also known as the Historical Kentucky Avenue Renaissance Festival, is a street fair held each summer in the former black entertainment district of Atlantic City, New Jersey. Founded in 1992, it appeared annually until 2001, and then resumed in 2011. Held on and around the site of the razed Club Harlem (today a parking lot), the weekend fair commemorates the R&B and jazz nightspots that once lined Kentucky Avenue and that attracted both black and white clientele in its heyday from the 1940s through 1960s. The festival features live performances by R&B and jazz musicians and bands, dance performances, street performers, arts and crafts for children, and food concessions, and draws hundreds of attendees.

== Background ==
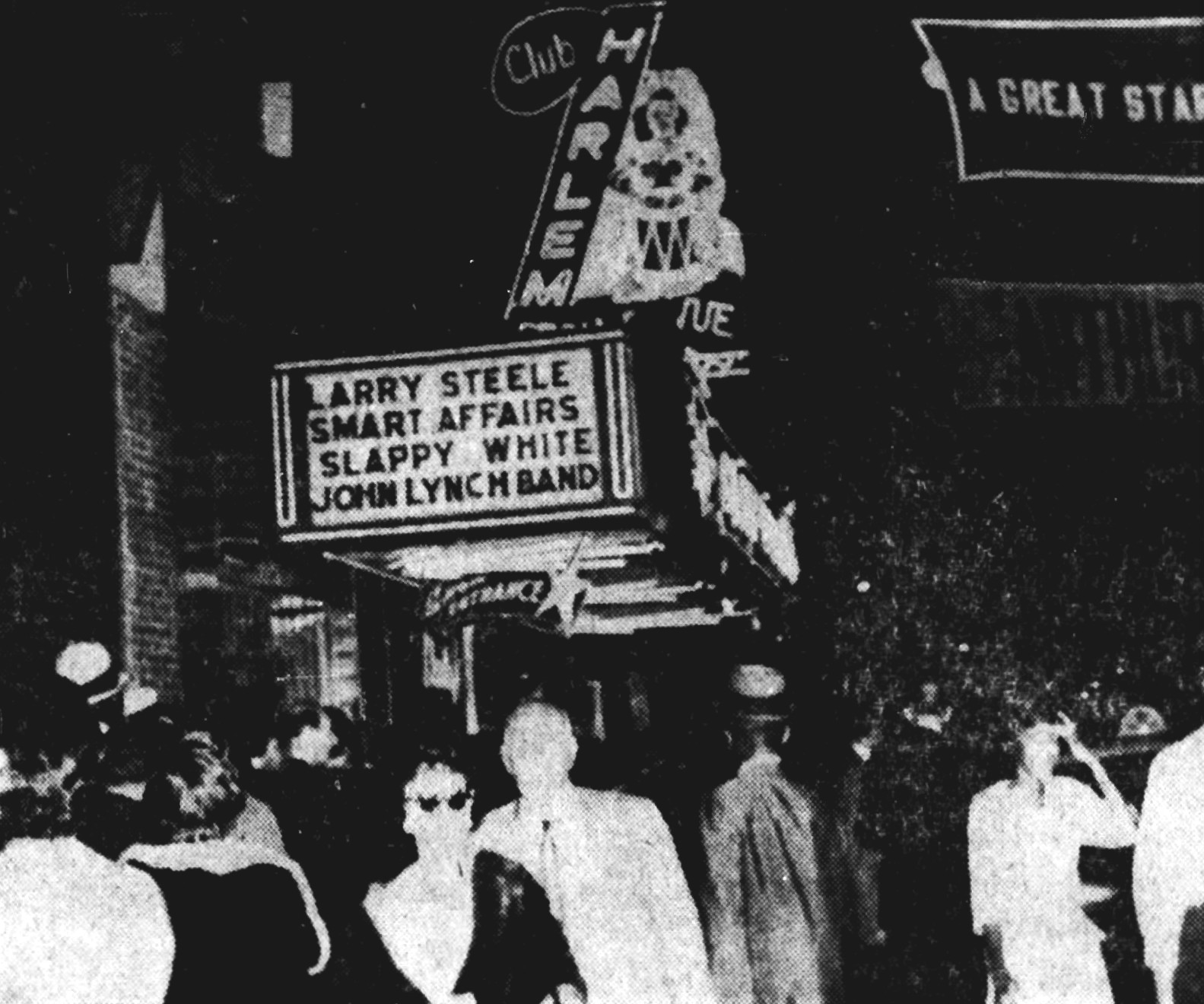
Club Harlem, 1964

Kentucky Avenue was the hub of the black entertainment district in Atlantic City from the 1940s through 1960s. The district (known as "Kentucky Avenue and the Curb") had been home to African-Americans in the racially-segregated city since the end of World War I. Kentucky Avenue, between Arctic and Atlantic Avenues, was home to many black-owned businesses, among them nightclubs that attracted both black and white clientele. The premier nightclub was Club Harlem, where the leading black entertainers of their time appeared. Other popular nightclubs were Grace's Little Belmont, the Wonder Gardens, and the Paradise Club. The street also had numerous barbecue chicken and ribs joints, such as Jerry's Ribs, Sapp's, and Booker the Bone Cooker, and a small soul food restaurant, Wash's Restaurant, popular with the black entertainers and patrons of the clubs. On summer weekends, the music and entertainment went on around the clock.

The district went into decline after an April 2, 1972 Easter morning shootout at Club Harlem. Four members of the Black Mafia entered the club during a show attended by an estimated 600 people and shot a rival operative point-blank at his table, ostensibly in retaliation for a drug deal. The dealer's bodyguard and three other women were killed in the melee that ensued. The introduction of hotel casinos to Atlantic City further eroded the popularity of the district. Club Harlem was the last nightclub operating by the 1980s; it was shuttered in 1986 and demolished in 1992.

== History ==
The first Kentucky Avenue Renaissance Festival was held a few months after Club Harlem's demolition, in June 1992. The festival was held on and around the site of the club, now a parking lot. In addition to saluting the entertainment of yesteryear, organizers hoped the festival would spark interest in redeveloping the former entertainment district on Kentucky Avenue. The festival was staged every summer after that until 2001.

In 2011 the Polaris Development Group, headed by Steven Young, in cooperation with the Atlantic City Public Library, the Casino Reinvestment Development Authority, and local business owners, reintroduced the festival as a way to cultivate interest in reviving the former entertainment district. The festival has been held annually since, aside from another break in 2014. In 2015 bad weather led to the rescheduling of the festival in November at The Claridge Hotel.

== Description ==
The first festival, in 1992, featured free concerts, arts and crafts, and concessions selling barbecued ribs and other foods. Chris Columbo, who conducted the Club Harlem orchestra for 34 years, performed, as did a dance troupe recreating the "Smart Affairs" revue headquartered at Club Harlem.

Reintroduced in 2011 after a ten-year hiatus, the renamed Historical Kentucky Avenue Renaissance Festival drew an estimated 1,000 attendees over the course of the day. Together with live R&B and jazz music, dance groups, and street performers, the festival features historical exhibits. Attendees come from Atlantic City as well as nearby Philadelphia, Pennsylvania.

== Kentucky Avenue Renaissance Mural ==
In July 1996 the Casino Reinvestment Development Authority commissioned a mural honoring the former Kentucky Avenue entertainment district. Painted on a brick wall near the corner of Kentucky and Baltic Avenues, the 10-by-64-foot (3.0 m × 19.5 m) mural depicts leading musicians who once performed in the area's nightclubs, such as singers Sammy Davis Jr., Billy Eckstine, and Ella Fitzgerald, and drummer Chris Columbo. The mural was painted by students of Atlantic City High School, who received $6 per hour from the Casino Authority and were entertained by jazz musicians while they painted.

== See also ==
- Chicken Bone Beach Jazz
- Chris Columbo, jazz drummer
- Springwood Avenue, African-American historical music district in Asbury Park, New Jersey

== Sources ==
- Griffin, S.P. (2006). Philadelphia's Black Mafia: A Social and Political History. Springer Science & Business Media. ISBN 0306481324.
- Waltzer, Jim; Wilk, Tom (2001). Tales of South Jersey: Profiles and Personalities. Rutgers University Press. ISBN 0813530075.
- Willis, Cheryl M. (2016). Tappin' at the Apollo: The African American Female Tap Dance Duo Salt and Pepper. McFarland. ISBN 978-1476623153.
