= Grace's Little Belmont =

Jazz music bar and lounge in Atlantic City, New Jersey

- Grace's Little Belmont, 2010

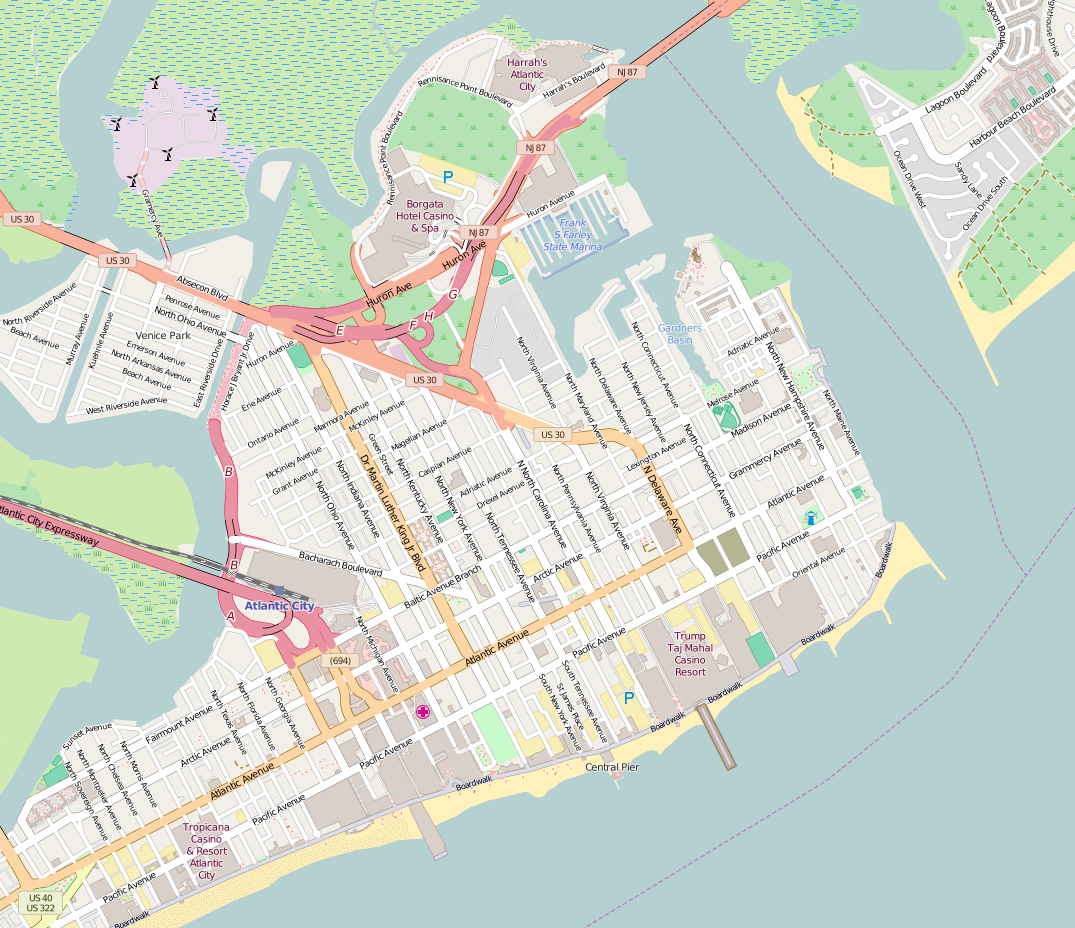
- Location in Atlantic City
- Address: 37 North Kentucky Avenue; Atlantic City, New Jersey; United States
- Coordinates: 39°21′36″N 74°25′47″W
- Type: Nightclub

Construction
- Opened: Mid-1930s
- Closed: Mid-1970s

Grace's Little Belmont was a jazz music bar and lounge in Atlantic City, New Jersey. Located at 37 North Kentucky Avenue, it was one of the four popular black nightclubs situated on that street between the mid-1930s and mid-1970s; the others were Club Harlem, the Paradise Club, and the Wonder Gardens. The Little Belmont was located across the street from Club Harlem, with which it often shared performers and patrons. Wild Bill Davis and his swing and jazz quartet were featured summer performers from 1950 through the mid-1960s, and Elvera M. "Baby" Sanchez, mother of Sammy Davis Jr., worked at the bar. The club closed in the mid-1970s and was later demolished.

== History ==
=== Early history ===
The Little Belmont Bar was established by Herndon Daniels, a "sportsman" and numbers banker, in the mid-1930s. By his own testimony, Daniels admitted to being in the numbers business in Atlantic City since 1931, and paying protection money to Atlantic City racketeer Nucky Johnson. In 1932 Daniels was listed as proprietor of the Capital Club, a "night life resort" in Atlantic City.

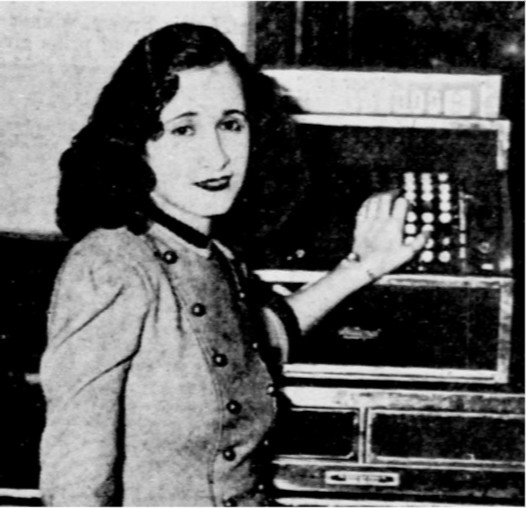
Alice Dixon Daniels at the cash register of the Little Belmont Bar in 1939

In 1939 Daniels was convicted of Federal income-tax evasion and sentenced to one year and one day at Lewisburg Federal Penitentiary. Three days before entering prison in October 1939, he married Alice Dixon of Philadelphia, a former showgirl who had performed at New York City's Connie's Inn, Cotton Club, and Kit Kat Club. Alice managed the bar in Daniels' absence together with Isaac (Ike) Nicholson. In May 1941, Daniels testified in U.S. district court that he had perjured himself before the grand jury investigating a link between Atlantic City numbers bankers in the hope that he could resume the numbers business after his release.

In July 1940 the Little Belmont, Club Harlem, the Paradise Club, and the Wonder Gardens were targeted in a midnight raid by police officers, accompanied by the newly elected mayor, Tom Taggart, seeking proof of illegal gambling activities. (Note: Taggart began the action by calling 40 policemen into his office, strapping on a revolver and stating, "Come on, we're going places.") The police confiscated "three truckloads of gambling paraphernalia" and arrested 32, then shut down the four clubs. The arrestees from the Little Belmont included Daniels (then on parole), Nicholson, and 13 others. All the detainees were released on bail, with Daniels' bail set higher than any others, at $5,000. The next day the clubs were open for business as usual. (Note: The mayor conducted a second raid two weeks later of the Wonder Bar, Little Belmont and Club Harlem. This raid found no gambling equipment or patrons at any of these clubs. Upon raiding the establishments and finding nothing, Taggart's comment was, "I heard these wise guys were going to try to open up again.")

=== Postwar ===
After World War II Daniels married Grace Morgan, owner of Grace's Organic Beauty School and barber shop located at 43 North Kentucky Avenue. The couple moved into rooms over the hair salon and Grace managed both the salon and the bar, which was subsequently renamed Grace's Little Belmont. The hair salon, established in 1938, was staffed for many years by barber William "Sonny" Lea, who bought the business in 1969 after the Daniels' retirement. Lea's celebrity customers included Slappy White, B.B. King, and Muhammad Ali.

Grace's Little Belmont attracted both black and white clientele, including "celebrities and night-life connoisseurs". The most popular shows, however, were the afternoon matinees, attended by beachgoers seeking relief from the summer heat. Guests often circulated between the Little Belmont and Club Harlem across the street, and the same performers played both clubs. After finishing her show at Club Harlem, comedian Moms Mabley sometimes crossed the street and did another routine at the Little Belmont. Boxer Joe Louis often entertained friends here in the late 1930s. In the 1960s, a young George Benson hung out at Grace's Little Belmont with young jazz composer Charles Earland after finishing his late-night set at the Wonder Gardens.

The Kentucky Avenue entertainment district went into decline in the late 1960s and further lost business to the hotel casinos opening on the boardwalk in the 1970s. Grace's Little Belmont closed in the mid-1970s and was later demolished.

== Description ==
The brick facade of the building had an art deco-style entrance with two square glass windows flanking the doorway. Inside, the lounge featured a bar in the shape of a horseshoe and a performance area with a Hammond B3 organ famously played by Wild Bill Davis during his annual summer engagement at the club in the 1950s and 1960s. Booths – considered comfortable by female patrons – lined the walls.

== Performers ==
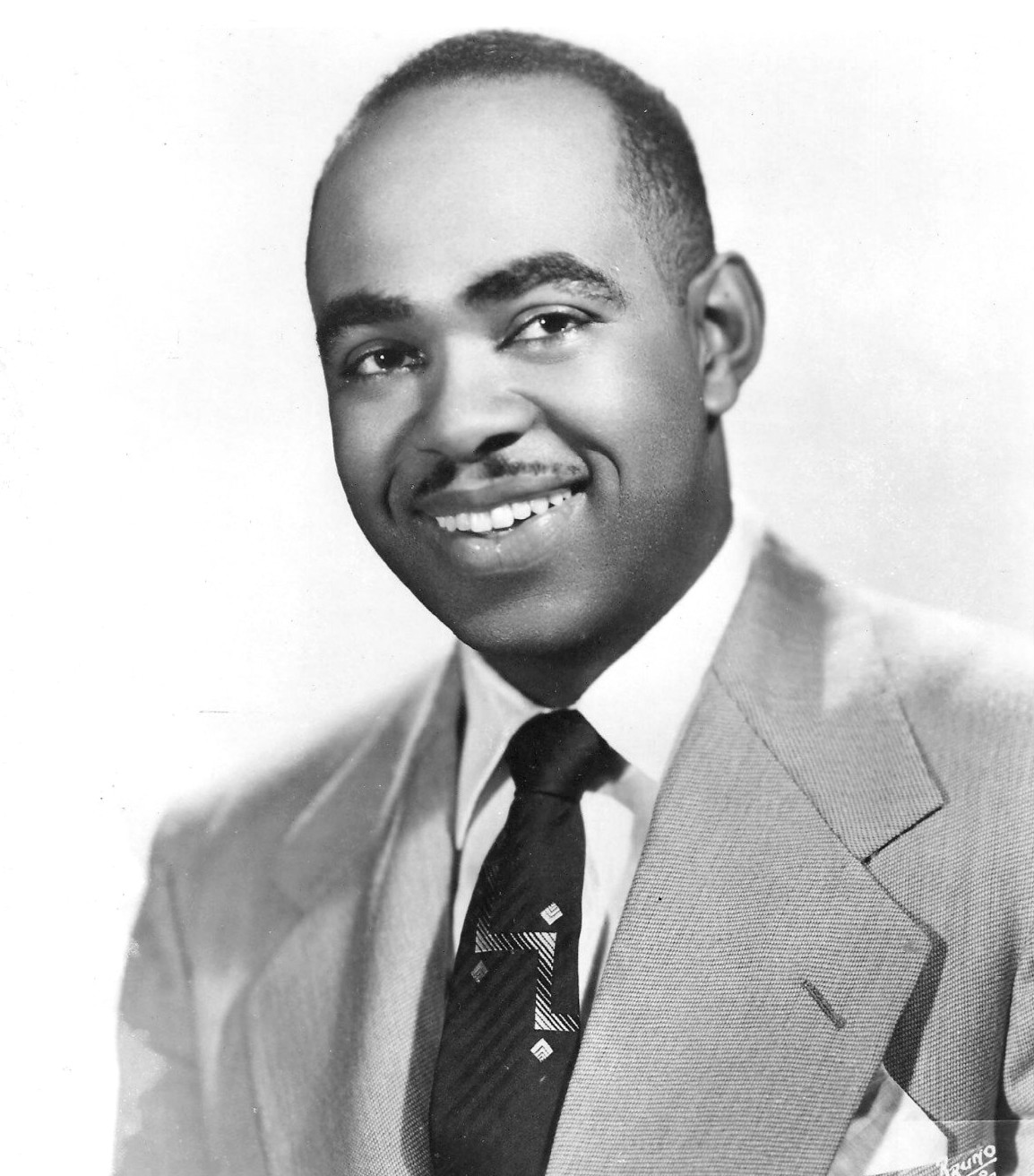
Wild Bill Davis in 1954

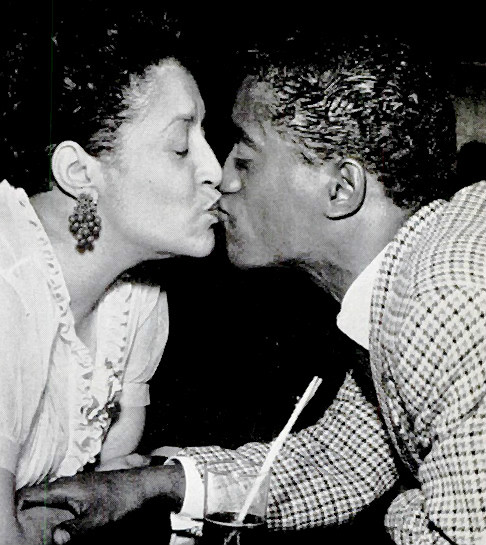
Sammy Davis Jr. kisses his mother, "Baby" Sanchez, at Grace's Little Belmont in 1954

Grace's Little Belmont booked a variety of black orchestras and combos during its 40-year history. In 1934 the Baltimore Afro-American reported that the Little Belmont Bar "has got that Harlem atmosphere", as it was featuring Israel Thompson's dance orchestra nightly with special appearance by Cotton Club dancer Amy Spencer. In 1949 the bar booked the Loumell Morgan Trio, with musicians on piano, guitar, and bass.

In the 1940s, jazz organist Wild Bill Davis began appearing at Grace's Little Belmont; he had a featured summer engagement here from 1950 through the mid-1960s. In 1948 jazz saxophonist Johnny Hodges, then vacationing in the resort town, dropped by the lounge and started jamming with Davis and his jazz quartet. Hodges returned each summer to continue the tradition. In 1966 Davis and Hodges, together with the other three members of Davis' quartet and jazz trombonist Lawrence Brown, recorded their jam session in front of a packed house. Titled Wild Bill Davis and Johnny Hodges in Atlantic City, the LP was released on the RCA Victor label. Davis recorded a second live performance album, Midnight to Dawn, at Grace's Little Belmont in 1967.

In July 1952 the club booked jazz pianist Ram Ramirez as a temporary replacement for Wild Bill Davis. In June 1953 it brought in the Johnny Sparrow trio, a popular group from Philadelphia, and a month later, the Billy Taylor trio. In the summer of 1956 Wild Bill Davis introduced his new trio at the lounge, with musicians on organ, piano, and guitar performing both original compositions and pop music. Noted as "one of the few, if not the only organist using two amplifiers", Davis' performance could be heard for blocks around.

Elvera M. "Baby" Sanchez, formerly a chorus line dancer at the Apollo Theater and mother of Sammy Davis Jr., began working as a barmaid at Grace's Little Belmont in 1941 after retiring from her show business career at age 35. She enjoyed telling jokes to customers and was known for sporting a gold napkin. Her connections with entertainers Count Basie, Billy Eckstine, and Sarah Vaughn drew these and other celebrities to her station, and her son Sammy would come to visit after performing across town at the 500 Club "and delighted everyone pouring drinks and singing". Frank Sinatra's valet George Jacobs recalled in his memoirs that Sinatra also liked to drop by Grace's Little Belmont in the early morning hours after his shows at the 500 Club to say hello to Davis' mother behind the bar.

== Legacy ==
The Hammond B3 organ at Grace's Little Belmont was moved to Asbury United Methodist Church in Atlantic City after the club closed. Princeton's Antiques & Books of Atlantic City is in possession of miniature models of Grace's Little Belmont, Club Harlem, and other Kentucky Avenue nightspots fashioned by local artist Joseph Frazier.

== See also ==
- Kentucky Avenue Renaissance Festival

== Sources ==
- Feather, Leonard; Gitler, Ira (2007). The Biographical Encyclopedia of Jazz. Oxford University Press. ISBN 978-0199886401.
- Fishgall, Gary (2010). Gonna Do Great Things: The Life of Sammy Davis, Jr. Simon & Schuster. ISBN 978-1-4391-3157-2.
- Folsom, Robert G. (2010). The Money Trail: How Elmer Irey and His T-men Brought Down America's Criminal Elite. Potomac Books. ISBN 978-1597974882.
- Haygood, Will (2014). In Black and White: The Life of Sammy Davis Junior. Knopf Doubleday Publishing Group. ISBN 978-0804172523.
- Hervieux, Linda (2015). Forgotten: The Untold Story of D-Day's Black Heroes, at Home and at War. HarperCollins. ISBN 978-0062313812.
- Jacobs, George; Stadiem, William (2003). Mr. S: My Life with Frank Sinatra. John Wiley & Sons. ISBN 0786259183.
- Simon, Bryant (2004). Boardwalk of Dreams: Atlantic City and the Fate of Urban America. Oxford University Press. ISBN 978-0-19-803744-6.
- Waltzer, Jim; Wilk, Tom (2001). Tales of South Jersey: Profiles and Personalities. Rutgers University Press. ISBN 0813530075.
