= Dixie Roberts =

Dixie Roberts (1919-2010) was a vaudeville tap and specialty dancer, who also danced in chorus lines and performed musical comedy. A featured dancer in the Ziegfeld Follies, she was often billed as the dancer who "taps with a Southern accent", although she was born in Elmhurst, New York. She explained her moniker, saying that she was conceived in her mother's hometown of Atlanta. Roberts grew up on Long Island and also in upstate New York, where she learned to dance and became an accomplished athlete before her years of touring the U.S. as an entertainer.

== Early life ==
Roberts was born April 5, 1919, in Elmhurst, NY.

Roberts took dancing lessons from Dorothy Fitch in Peekskill, New York, while she attended Carmel High School. She taught dance after school, charging 25 cents an hour, often walking the five miles home after she finished teaching.

A professional dancer at age 16, Roberts' first job was at the Paramount Theatre in New York, dancing with the Tommy Dorsey Band in 1935. She and her partner were one of the five acts on the bill with the band. She danced with Horace Nichols, with whom she had earlier won the title, "King and Queen of Shag" at the Paramount Theatre, N.Y.

Roberts was also a prizewinning athlete, New York State Cue Champion, and expert riflewoman. An A.A.U. swimming champ, Roberts was invited to train for the Olympic swim team, an offer her father did not let her accept. In 1943, Physical Culture magazine reported that, as a youngster in upstate New York, Roberts was "the best feminine baseball player in the county, and was hard to beat at tennis, basketball and swimming". Similarly, the Sunday Mirror reported that 22-year-old Roberts, "once had a run of 93 in three cushion billiards, bowls a neat 200 and finished last season batting .405 ... and has the trophies to prove it ... She has won 11 plaques for excellence in sports since she's been in show business, and her accomplishments range from swimming and track to stud poker. There's a popular belief that men don't like athletic girls, but Dixie belies it. She's probably the most popular dame in the show, in a cast of 50 expensive stunners."

== Early dancing career ==
In 1939, at age 20, Roberts taught and performed on weekends at Grossinger's Catskill Resort Hotel, which was the inspiration for "Kellerman's Resort" in the movie Dirty Dancing.

Roberts was on Showboat on NBC Television, in 1939.

She also performed in USO tours, for the Marines and the Flying Tigers. During one USO hospital tour, she tap danced with Peg Leg Bates, a one-legged tap dancer. She said that he danced far better with one leg than anyone else could with two.

Between shows at the Earle Theatre in Philadelphia, she shot pool with Bunny Berigan, "the greatest white trumpet player who ever lived," according to Louis Armstrong.

== Ziegfeld Follies ==
Roberts was a specialist tap dancer in the Ziegfeld Follies of 1943, at the Winter Garden Theater, in which she partnered with Milton Berle in one of her dance numbers. She and Berle played pool after matinees and later she was a guest on his NBC Television show.

== Later career highlights ==
Roberts was a specialty performer in the 1944 Broadway show, Dream with Music, in which she danced with Vera Zorina, wife of George Balanchine, the ballet choreographer for the show; and worked with Henry LeTang, the show's tap choreographer.

She opened shows for such notables as Artie Shaw, Jimmy Dorsey, Danny Thomas, Henny Youngman, Ben Blue, Charlie Spivak, Joe E. Lewis, Pearl Bailey, Jimmy Durante, Steve Allen, Woody Herman, and Benny Goodman. Roberts often made a memorable entrance sliding onto the stage.

Roberts often performed in five or six shows per day, beginning in the morning and ending late in the evening, which was standard procedure for that time.

During her career, Roberts also performed on Broadway, at the Copacabana (N.Y.), the Troika (Washington, D. C.), The Rainbow Room (N.Y.), The Chez Paree (Chicago), the Orpheum (San Francisco), and other venues.

After one performance in 1946, Roberts had a surprise visit from Gene Kelly, who made his way backstage to tell her what a good dancer he thought she was. They went out to Armando's in New York, afterwards, and he tried to convince her to go to Hollywood, but she stayed on the East Coast.

Famous columnist Walter Winchell singled Roberts out appreciatively on a number of occasions, once as "one of the lookers in the Ziegfeld Follies."

After her stage career, Roberts often worked at parties for Marjorie Merriweather Post, giving dance performances, lessons, and dancing with the guests. Post, mother of actress Dina Merrill, and married to E.F. Hutton, was society's grand dame at the time.

Roberts died on April 15, 2010, at the age of 91.

== Bibliography ==
- Sarasota Herald Tribune, Mar. 17, 1988;
- Toledo Blade, Feb. 12, 1953;
- The Herald, Montreal, Aug. 21, 1950;
- Miami Herald, Feb. 18, 1950;
- Miami Daily News, Feb. 16, 1950;
- Jacksonville Journal, Dec 31, 1949
- The Washington Daily News, Nov. 8, 1949;
- Miami Daily News, Jan. 5, 1948;
- Screen Stars magazine, Oct. 1946;
- New York Journal-American, May 26, 1946;
- New York Journal-American, May 24, 1946;
- Morning Star Miami Beach, Feb. 22, 1946;
- NOW in Greater Miami, Jan. 26, 1946;
- NOW in Greater Miami, Jan. 19, 1946;
- Chicago Sunday Times, Oct. 21, 1945;
- Chicago Daily Tribune, Oct. 2, 1945;
- Chicago Herald-American, Sept. 8, 1945;
- The Chicago Sun, Sept. 6, 1945;
- Chicago Herald-American, Sept. 5, 1945;
- The Billboard, Sept. 1, 1945;
- The Chicago Sun, Aug. 25, 1945;
- Akron Beacon Journal, Aug. 3, 1945;
- The Windsock, June 16, 1945;
- San Francisco Chronicle, Apr. 25, 1945;
- Los Angeles Examiner, Apr. 11, 1945;
- Philadelphia Inquirer, Mar. 31, 1945;
- Philadelphia Daily News, Mar. 30, 1945;
- The Evening Star, Wash. D.C., Nov. 23, 1944;
- Pittsburgh Post Gazette, Sept. 11, 1944;
- New York Daily Mirror, column: Walter Winchell in New York, Mar. 15, 1944;
- Physical Culture magazine, Dec. 1943;
- Sunday Mirror, Magazine section, Aug. 15, 1943;
- Brooklyn Eagle, June 2, 1943;
- New York Daily Mirror, column: Walter Winchell in New York, May 1943;
- Phil Daily News, Mar. 6, 1943;
- The Boston Record, Jan. 15, 1943
