= Turf Club (New Jersey) =

Music venue in Asbury Park, New Jersey

- U.S. National Register of Historic Places
- New Jersey Register of Historic Places
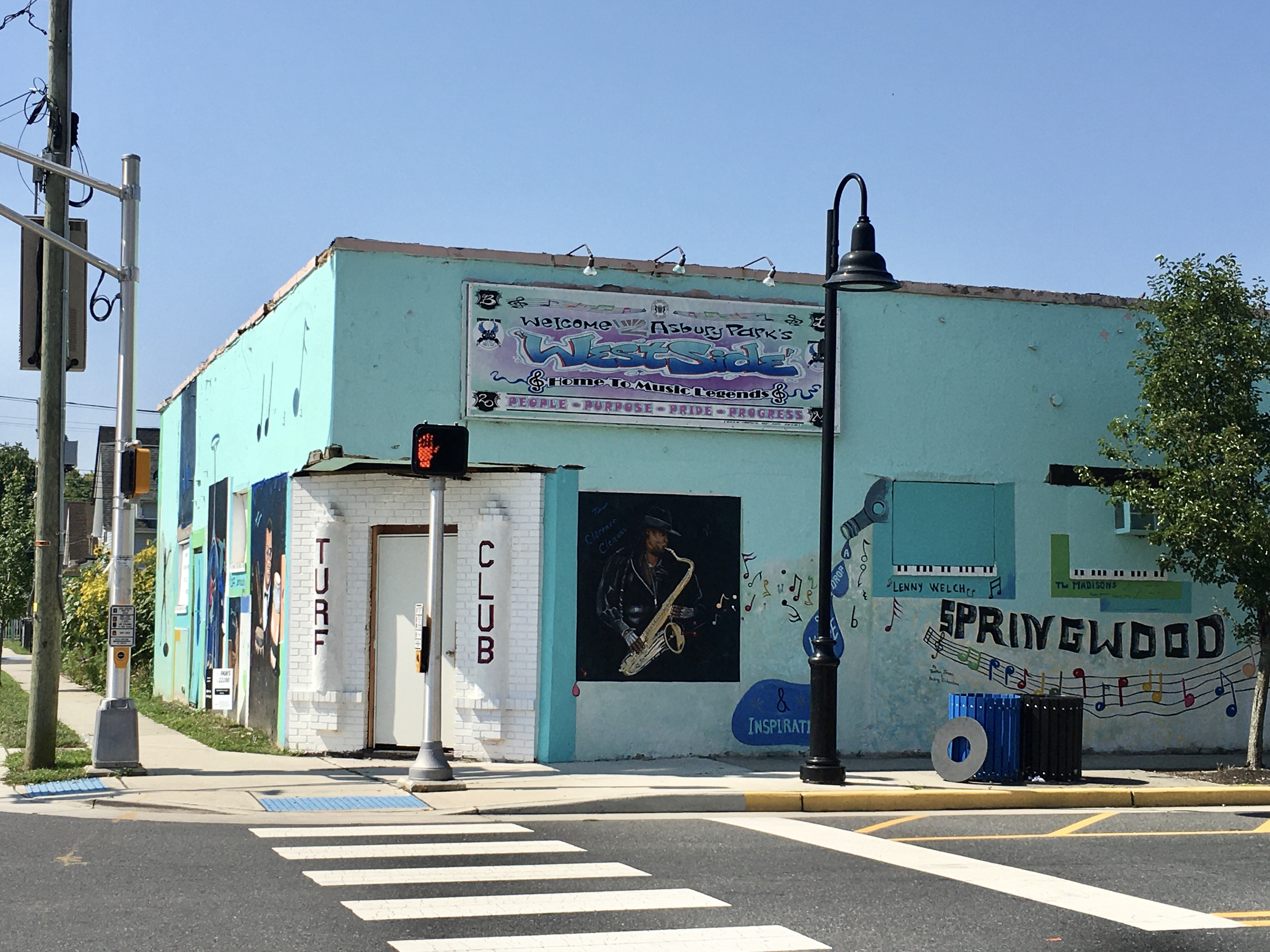
- Turf Club, 2021

- Location within Monmouth County, New Jersey Location within New Jersey Location within the United States
- Location: 1200 Springwood Avenue, Asbury Park, New Jersey
- Coordinates: 40°12′53.8″N 74°1′15.6″W
- Built: 1955
- NRHP reference No.: 100011730
- NJRHP No.: 5967
- Added to NRHP: April 28, 2025

The Turf Club is a historic music venue located on the west side of Asbury Park, New Jersey undergoing building improvements as of 2025. It is the last remaining venue along Springwood Avenue, a once-thriving African-American business and entertainment district. It was listed on the National Register of Historic Places on April 28, 2025, for its significance in entertainment and ethnic heritage.

== Founding ==
The Turf Club opened around 1940 at 1125 Springwood Avenue. Its original owners were Robert and Caroll Brown. Ownership was soon transferred to John Moore, who operated the club until 1947.

Leo Karp and Sol Konvitz owned and operated the club at its original location from 1948 to 1955. No records indicate that the club was used as a music venue before 1956.

== Music venue ==
In 1956, Leo Karp moved the club to 1200 Springwood Avenue and changed the name to "Leo's Turf Club". The venue presented musical acts including Illinois Jacquet and Clarence Clemons. Lenny Welch, the Broadways, Dee Holland and others played the club.

Ownership was transferred again to Waylon Goldston in January 1970. Goldston changed the club's name to "Wakie's Show Place." In July of the same year, businesses along Springwood Avenue were damaged or destroyed during the Asbury Park riots, a civil uprising during which Black youth in the area revolted against poor treatment, housing conditions, and an unemployment crisis. The club remained opened and continued to operate.

The club was purchased by Frederick Thorne in 1972 and was renamed "Turf Melody Lounge". It changed hands twice more, becoming “Mae’s Melody Lounge” and then the “Sports Turf Club.”

There was a fire at the club in the late 1990s, after which it changed hands a few more times, with one new owner planning to open a laundromat at the location.

== Restoration efforts ==
In 2020, the Asbury Park African-American Music Project (AP-AMP) announced plans to revitalize The Turf Club. The organization purchased the club in 2022 and, in the same year, received a grant from the National Trust for Historic Preservation's African American Cultural Heritage Action Fund to help cover rehabilitation expenses.

AP-AMP has hosted live music events at the club since 2021.

In 2023, Bruce Springsteen and Patti Scialfa donated $100,000 to restore the venue for live music and performing arts. The AP-AMP recently restored the roof as of late 2023.

== See also ==
- National Register of Historic Places listings in Monmouth County, New Jersey
- List of New Jersey music venues by capacity
- Jersey Shore sound
- Music of Asbury Park, describing the history of Black music on the West Side plus music across the whole city.
- Kentucky Avenue, historical Black entertainment district in Atlantic City.
- Bruce Springsteen Center for American Music at Monmouth University
- Jazz of Newark, New Jersey
- Jersey club music (modern Black electronic dance music)
- New Jersey sound (a variety of deep house music)
- Clement's Place
- The African American Heritage Museum of Southern New Jersey in Atlantic City at Noyes Arts Garage
- Missouri Avenue Beach (historically segregated beach in Atlantic City, New Jersey)
- Club Zanzibar
