= Peg leg =

Leg prosthesis

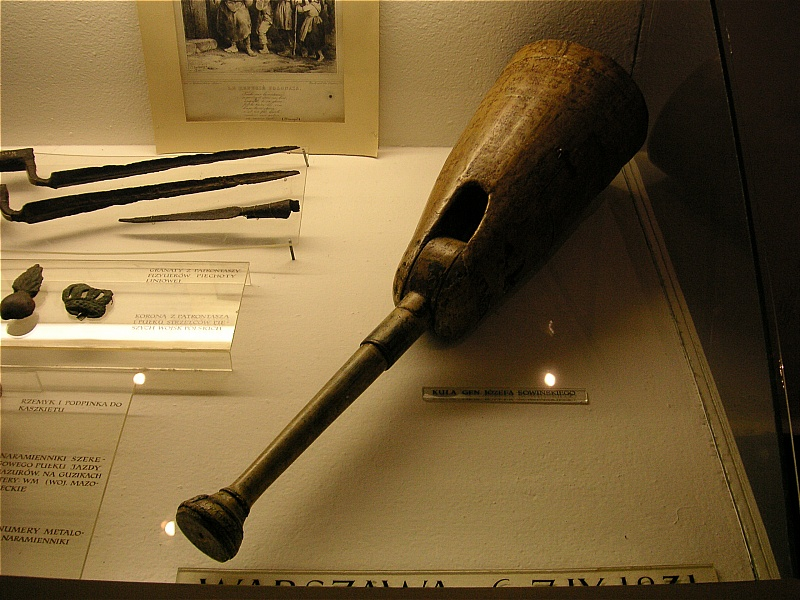
Peg leg of Józef Sowiński

A peg leg is a prosthesis, or artificial limb, fitted to the remaining stump of a human leg, especially a wooden one fitted at the knee. Its use dates to antiquity.

== History ==
By the late 19th century, prosthetics vendors offered peg legs as cheaper alternatives to the intricate, lifelike artificial legs available at that time. Even as these vendors touted the advantages of more complicated prostheses over simple peg legs, according to a contemporary surgeon, many patients found peg legs more comfortable for walking. According to medical reports, some amputees adapted so well to using a peg leg that they could walk 10 or even 30 miles in one day.

Nowadays, wooden peg legs have been replaced by more modern materials, although some sports prostheses still maintain the same form.

== Notable peg leg wearers ==
- François Le Clerc (died 1563), privateer
- Cornelis Jol, (1597–1641), privateer and Dutch West India Company admiral
- Peter Stuyvesant (1612–1672), Dutch Director-General of New Amsterdam
- Blas de Lezo (1687–1741), Spanish admiral
- Gouverneur Morris (1752–1816), American politician
- Brook Watson (1735–1807), Lord Mayor of London
- Pierre Daumesnil (1776–1832), French general
- Józef Sowiński (1777–1831), Polish General
- Billy Waters (1778–1823), aka Black Billy, former African American slave, then sailor in the British Navy until he became an amputee. Also, a prolific busker merit.
- Vuk Karadžić (1787–1864), Serbian linguist
- Thomas L. Smith (1801–1866), American mountain man
- Albert Chmielowski (1845–1916), Polish artist, founder of the Albertine Brothers and Sisters, saint of the Catholic Church
- Robert McAlpin Williamson (1804?–1859), nicknamed "Three-legged Willie", Republic of Texas Supreme Court Justice, state lawmaker, and Texas Ranger
- Kushibiki Yumindo (1859?–1924), Japanese impresario
- Peg Leg Bates (1907–1998), dancer
- Peg Leg Sam (Arthur Jackson) (1911–1977), American blues musician
- Bill Veeck (1914–1986), American baseball executive
- Joe "Pegleg" Morgan (1929–1993), the first non-Hispanic member of the Mexican Mafia, an American criminal organization
