= Larry Steele (producer) =

American songwriter

- Born: 1913
- Died: June 19, 1980 (aged 66–67) Chicago, Illinois, U.S.
- Occupations: Producer, composer, songwriter

Larry Steele (1913 – 1980) was an American songwriter, composer, and impresario, notable for his all-black variety revue shows. Steele was dubbed the "Black Flo Ziegfeld" for his dazzling productions. He toured with his troupe called Smart Affairs between from 1947 to 1970. Performers featured in Smart Affairs included Cab Calloway, Nat King Cole, Sammy Davis Jr., Sara Vaughan, and Lou Rawls. As a songwriter, Steele wrote over 200 songs over the course of his career.

== Life and career ==
=== Early life ===
Born in 1913, Steele was raised in Chicago, Illinois. His father was a barber and didn't not want him to go into show business. Steele's father and his five sisters wanted Steele to become a lawyer, so he intended to study law at Northwestern University. His plans changed in 1934 when he was offered a job for $3 a night as a singing master of ceremonies and bandleader at Panama Café in the South Side.

=== Smart Affairs ===
Steele left Chicago in the mid-1940s and helped organize entertainers on the Chitlin Circuit. By, 1946 he was based in Atlantic City, New Jersey at Club Harlem where he opened his first Smart Affairs production in 1947. At a time when black women were not showcased for their beauty and talents, Steele's Smart Affairs gave black chorus girls, referred to as the "Beige Beauts," a platform to perform and featured premiere black musical acts. Starting at small clubs and hotels, Smart Affairs toured throughout the country to rave reviews. The troupe became a big business, performing at famous venues such as the Flamingo Hotel in Miami, Chicago's Regal Theater and Tivoli Theater, and touring internationally. In 1960, it was estimated that Steele's production grossed $400,00 to $500,00 a year and he employed 40 to 50 performers from 40 to 50 weeks a year. Smart Affairs featured a variety of performers, including Billy Daniels, Savannah Churchill, Freda Payne, Peg Leg Bates, Lola Falana, Cab Calloway, Arthur Lee Simpkins, Al Hibber, Olga James, Mabel Scott, and Sallie Blair.

In 1952, Smart Affairs was the only all-black show on Broadway since the closure of the Cotton Club.

In 1955 and 1956, the show was billed as Harlem Blackbirds when they performed at the Palladium Stage Theater in Australia. They were the first all-black show to tour Australia and New Zealand.

In 1962, the troupe began touring concert auditoriums to accommodate the audiences of comedians Dick Gregory and Damita Jo who headlined the revue that year.

In 1968, Smart Affairs performed at Atlantic City's Steel Pier and the Tropicoro Room of the El San Juan in Puerto Rico. Featured performers included the Constellations, the Nicholas Brothers, and Anselmo Sacasas and his orchestra.

By 1969, Smart Affairs offered two simultaneous shows, one at Club Harlem in Atlantic City and the other at the Eden Roc Hotel in Miami Beach. The last edition of Smart Affairs took place in 1970.

=== Later life and death ===
1969, Steele formed his own publishing firm, Larste, headquartered in Chicago.

After 35 years of marriage, Steele's wife Nannie "Nana" Meyers Steele, died in 1972. She was a former choreographer and was president of his company Larry Steele Enterprises Inc. at the time of her death. After she died, Steele struggled financially and moved into a low-income housing project. Although a member of A.S.C.A.P. (American Society of Composers, Authors and Publishers) since 1964, he couldn't get a song published or sung. Steele also had health issues, but he couldn't afford proper health care. He was too ashamed to ask his friends in the entertainment industry for assistance, but he eventually reached out to Jet magazine about his ordeal. His health was declining from a combination of illnesses, including diabetes and a pancreatic problem. Steele died of heart failure in a Chicago hospital after he was found unconscious in his apartment by his landlady in 1980. He was survived by his nephew Lawrence Lindsay. Steele was interred at Burr Oak Cemetery.

== Honors ==
For "projecting the true picture of Negro in travels abroad," Steele received the Racial Dignity and Human Relations Award from Howard University's Alumni Association in 1961.

In 1975, Steele was honored with a tribute show at Atlantic City's Holiday Inn for his achievements in Black entertainment.
