= Paradise Club (Atlantic City, New Jersey) =

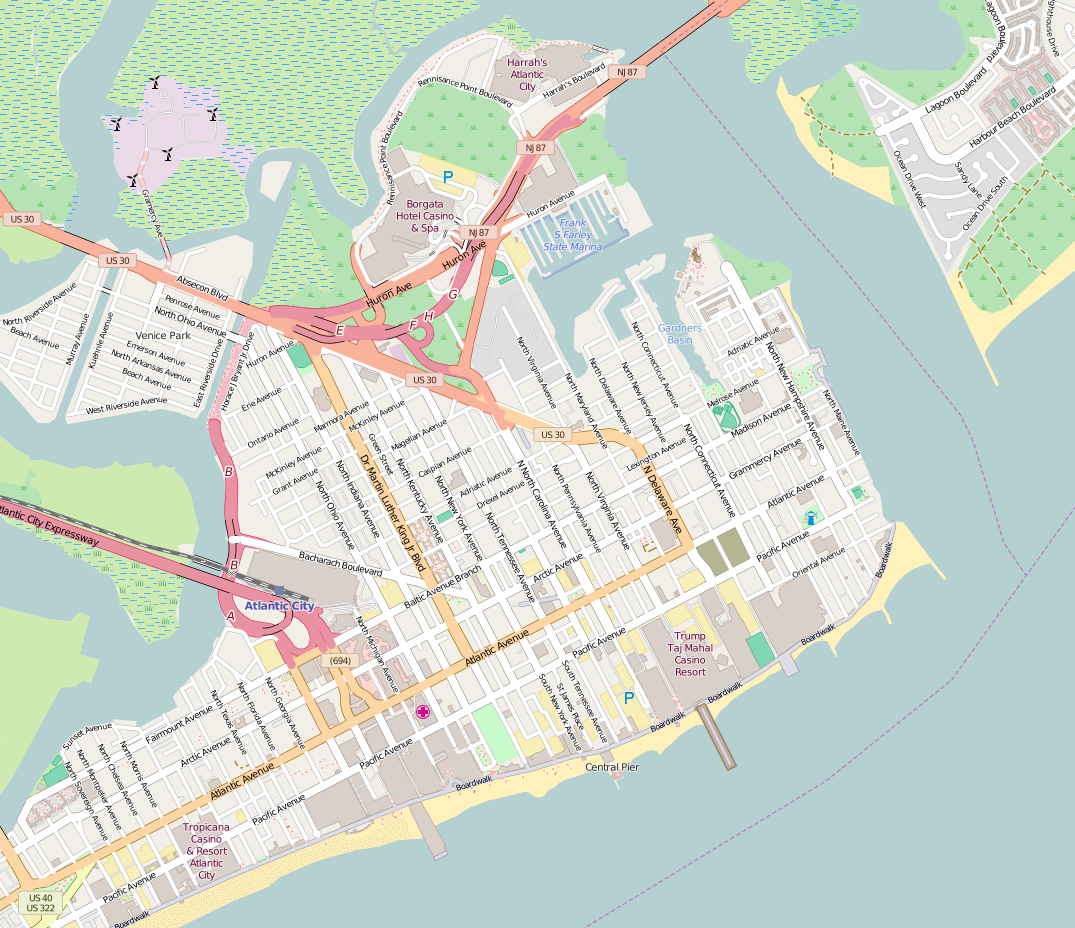
- Location in Atlantic City
- Address: 220 North Illinois Avenue; Atlantic City, New Jersey; United States
- Coordinates: 39°21′50″N 74°26′2″W
- Owner: Harold Abrams, Clifton Williams, Ben Alten
- Type: Nightclub, jazz club

The Paradise Club or Club Paradise was a nightclub and jazz club at 220 North Illinois Avenue in Atlantic City, New Jersey. It was one of two major black jazz clubs in Atlantic City during its heyday from the 1920s through 1950s, the other being Club Harlem. Entertaining a predominantly white clientele, it was known for its raucous floor shows featuring gyrating black dancers accompanied by high-energy jazz bands led by the likes of Count Basie, Jimmie Lunceford, and Lucky Millinder. In 1954 the Paradise Club merged with Club Harlem under joint ownership.

== History ==
Opened in the 1920s, the Paradise Club was owned by Harold Paul Abrams, who also owned Harold's Club and the Basin Street Club. Abrams was also the general manager of the 500 Club. Abrams promoted the Paradise as "the oldest nightclub in America". It was the first club to offer "breakfast shows" after the nightlong entertainment.

Willis notes that most of the white clientele came from the Traymore Hotel, a summer resort. While it was fine for them to frequent the all-black shows at the Paradise Club, none of the black performers could use the whites-only beach at the Traymore. Blacks in the racially segregated city were restricted to one section of the beach, but were able to enter attractions on the entire Boardwalk.

During the 1946 off-season the club opened the Paradise Swing Room, a musical bar.

In May 1954 the Paradise Club announced its merger with Club Harlem. Clifton Williams and Ben Alten of Club Harlem became co-owners with Abrams. With the merger, the elaborate Smart Affairs revue presented by Larry Steele at Club Harlem began appearing at the Paradise Club as well.

Like other nightclubs in the district, the Paradise Club succumbed to a drop-off in business from the advent of legalized casino gambling in Atlantic City. By the mid-1980s, only Club Harlem was still operating. The site of the club is now a parking lot.

== Architecture and interior ==
The club's nondescript exterior and "simple neon sign" revealed nothing of the raucous goings-on within. The interior was designed like "a Prohibition-era roadhouse" with darkened rooms, low ceilings, and small tables arranged around the dance floor and stage. During the stage shows, while, amber, and blue colored spotlights played around the room. A girl in a short skirt walked around taking souvenir pictures of the guests.

== Shows ==
The stage shows opened with singers warming up the crowd with "risqué vaudeville tunes" and comedians dressed in "overalls and straw hats [who] told raunchy jokes". These were followed by a troupe of six "dark-skinned, full-bodied" women outfitted in "top hats, short black shorts, and tuxedo vests a size or two too small" performing as the Sextuplet Dancers, backed by the Count Basie band. Alternate shows featured "light-skinned" dancers in feather boas and bikinis performing in front of "a trio of African American drummers dressed like the natives in a Tarzan movie".

The gyrating, hip-thrusting dancers were considered a bigger draw for the white audience than the musicians, who included future jazz greats Count Basie, Jimmie Lunceford, and Lucky Millinder. As Johnny Coles, a member of Clifford Brown's band, described it: "This gig was about playing the show; it wasn't about playing jazz. . . We'd get a chance to do maybe a jazz tune or two before the show started". However, after the last show ended, the musicians would often go over to Club Harlem to jam with their band into the early morning hours, and musicians performing at the Steel Pier would make their way to the Paradise for the same purpose.

Popular acts at the Paradise Club included Salt and Pepper, a black female tap dancing duo, Dorcyee Bradley, an exotic dancer, and comedy team Stump and Stumpy. The club also featured novelty acts, such as tap dancer Peg Leg Bates, whose "Jet Plane" finale, in which he leaped over the stage, landed on his wooden leg, and then executed a series of backward hops accompanied by trumpet blasts from the band, saw his leg puncture the wooden stage floor in the early 1940s. It took half an hour to pull him out. After that, the stage floor was reinforced with metal sheeting. Cholly Atkins and Honi Coles directed a revue at the Paradise in the summer of 1941. In the 1950s Tadd Dameron arranged and conducted the music for the club's revue. Other jazz musicians who played the Paradise included Frankie Manning, Sonny Clay, and Clifford Brown.

The Count Basie Orchestra had a summer residency at the club in 1947, opening on 27 June. They agreed to perform for reduced wages for the opportunity for a full summer booking. During the engagement, Basie was on a deep fishing trip and fell overboard while trying to land a fish. Club owner Abrams jumped overboard to save the musician.

== Illegal gambling ==
The Paradise Club was one of four Atlantic City nightclubs raided by police in July 1940 on suspicion of illegal gambling activities. Led by the new mayor, Tom Taggert, the raiding party confiscated "three truckloads of gambling paraphernalia" and arrested 32, then shut down the Paradise Club, Club Harlem, the Wonder Gardens, and Grace's Little Belmont. (Note: Taggart began the action by calling 40 policemen into his office, strapping on a revolver and stating, "Come on, we're going places.") The clubs were doing business as usual the day after the raid.

== Sources ==
- Atkins, Cholly; Malone, Jacqui (2012). Class Act: The Jazz Life of Choreographer Cholly Atkins. Columbia University Press. ISBN 978-0231504126.
- Catalano, Nick (2001). Clifford Brown: The Life and Art of the Legendary Jazz Trumpeter (Revised ed.). Oxford University Press. ISBN 0195144007.
- Love, Preston (1997). A Thousand Honey Creeks Later: My Life in Music from Basie to Motown—and Beyond. Wesleyan University Press. ISBN 081956320X.
- Manning, Frankie; Millman, Cynthia R. (2007). Frankie Manning: Ambassador of Lindy Hop. Temple University Press. ISBN 978-1592135639.
- Simon, Bryant (2004). Boardwalk of Dreams: Atlantic City and the Fate of Urban America. Oxford University Press. ISBN 978-0-1951-6753-5.
- Vacher, Peter (2015). Swingin' on Central Avenue: African American Jazz in Los Angeles. Rowman & Littlefield. ISBN 978-0810888333.
- Vail, Ken (2003). Count Basie: Swingin' the Blues, 1936–1950. Scarecrow Press. ISBN 978-0-8108-4882-5.
- Waltzer, Jim; Wilk, Tom (2001). Tales of South Jersey: Profiles and Personalities. Rutgers University Press. ISBN 0813530075.
- Willis, Cheryl M. (2016). Tappin' at the Apollo: The African American Female Tap Dance Duo Salt and Pepper. McFarland. ISBN 978-1476623153.
