= Dan Fogel (musician) =

American jazz organist

- Born: June 21, 1948 (Age 75); Atlantic City, New Jersey
- Genres: Jazz
- Occupation: Musician
- Instrument(s): Organ, piano
- Labels: Laughing Waters

Dan Fogel (June 21, 1948 – August 11, 2021) was an American jazz organist who played the Hammond B-3 organ.

== Biography ==
Dan Fogel was born June 21, 1948, in Atlantic City, New Jersey. Fogel purchased his first organ by age 11. At age 13 he began playing in nightclubs in Atlantic City.

Fogel worked with Pat Martino, Odean Pope, Billy James, Sunny Murray, Cecil Payne, Tony Ventura, Rufus Harley, Monnette Sudler, Harvey Mason, O'Donel Levy, and Bootsie Barnes.

In 2012, Down Beat magazine critics voted Fogel a Rising Star on the Hammond B-3 organ.

He died on August 11, 2021.

== Discography ==
Movement de la Mer	1983	Laughing Waters		Hammond B-3 organ
Naked Flowers	1986	Laughing Waters	DF-1	piano and organ
Something Like That	1990	Laughing Waters	LW-CD246	Hammond B-3 organ
ORACLE	2001	Laughing Waters	DF-2	piano
SOUL EYES	2004	Laughing Waters	DF-8272	Hammond B-3 organ
15 West	2006	Laughing Waters	DF-1949	Hammond B-3 organ
