= Club Harlem =

Former Atlantic City, New Jersey nightclub

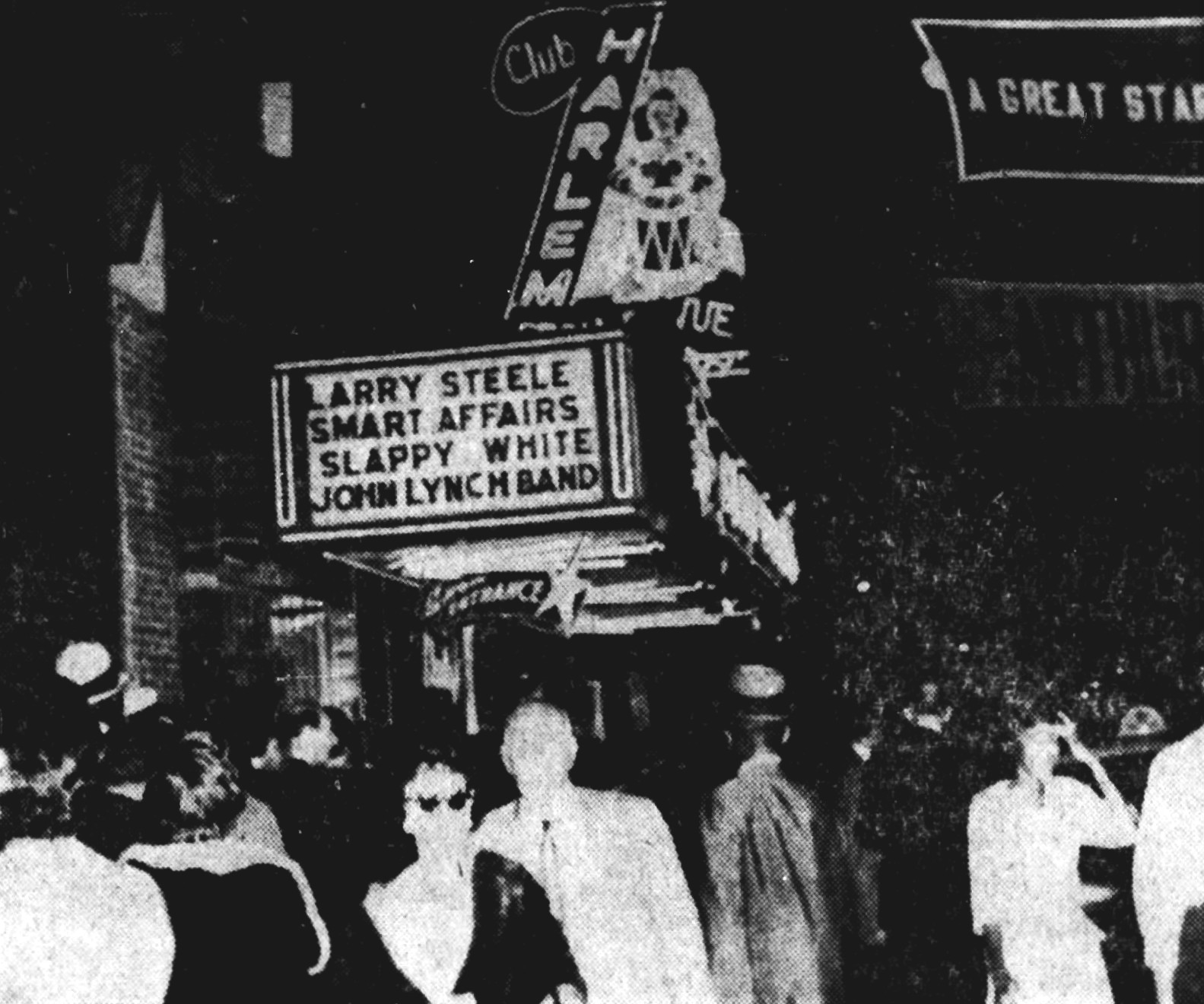
- Club Harlem, 1964

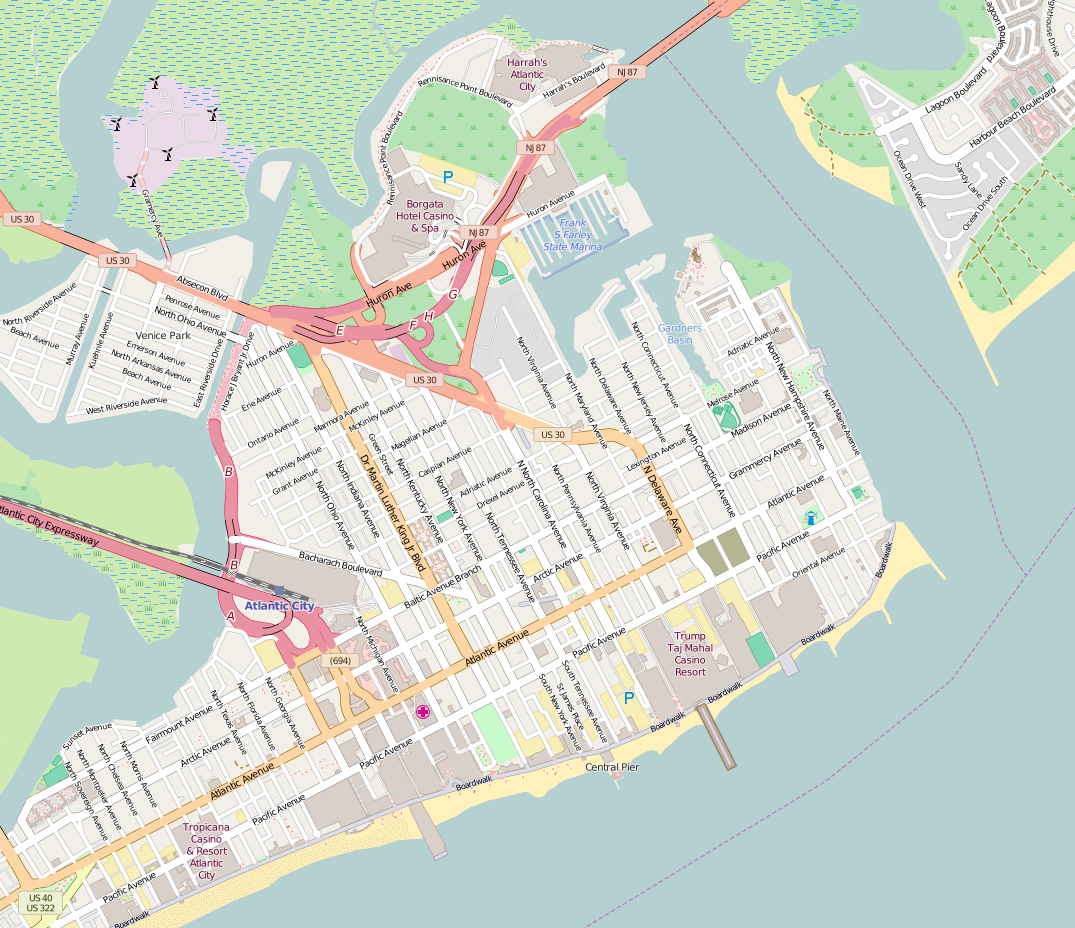
- Location in Atlantic City
- Address: 32 North Kentucky Avenue; Atlantic City, New Jersey; United States
- Coordinates: 39°21′35″N 74°25′47″W
- Owner: Leroy "Pop" Williams, Clifton Williams, Ben Alten, Cecil Randall
- Capacity: 900–1000
- Type: Nightclub

Construction
- Opened: 1935
- Closed: 1986

Club Harlem was a nightclub at 32 North Kentucky Avenue in the Northside neighborhood of Atlantic City, New Jersey, United States. Founded in 1935 by Leroy "Pop" Williams, it was the city's premier club for black jazz performers. Like its Harlem counterpart, the Cotton Club, many of Club Harlem's guests were white, wealthy and eager to experience a night of African-American entertainment.

An elaborate all-black revue called Smart Affairs, produced by Larry Steele and headquartered at the club from 1946 to 1971, featured 40 to 50 acts and was on a par with Broadway productions. Performers at the club included Sammy Davis Jr. (who would also invite the white members of the Rat Pack), Dick Gregory, Dinah Washington, Bootsie Barnes, Gladys Knight, Teddy Pendegrass, Hot Lips Page, and Wild Bill Davis. Drummer Crazy Chris Columbo conducted the club orchestra for 34 years. Club Harlem was outfitted with seven bars, two lounges and a main showroom seating more than 900. A cocktail lounge had room for 400 guests with continuous entertainment available.

Club Harlem was the site of the 1972 Easter morning shootout of a Black Mafia operative by three rival operatives, leaving five dead and 20 wounded, in full view of a show audience estimated at 600 people. The club closed in 1986 and was demolished in 1992. Mementos salvaged from the club are part of a traveling exhibition which has appeared in Atlantic City and other locales since 2010.

== History ==
Club Harlem was founded in 1935 by Leroy "Pop" Williams on the site of a dance hall called Fitzgerald's Auditorium. (Note: Fitzgerald's closed in 1933.) Williams was a medical student at University of Pennsylvania when he managed to acquire enough money to buy Fitzgerald's; he left college after becoming the owner of the nightclub. Williams gave the new nightclub the name of the Manhattan neighborhood because "a lot of black people live there". The district, known as "Kentucky Avenue and the Curb", had become the home for African Americans in the racially segregated city since the end of World War I. The new nightspot joined other popular black entertainment venues in the district such as Grace's Little Belmont, the Wintergarten, and the Paradise Club. Along with Harlem's Cotton Club, it was a place for the moneyed set to enjoy an evening of African-American entertainment. When the club opened in 1935, there were slot machines along with a basketball court on the top floor of the building. In the 1940s the club became known as Clifton's Club Harlem.

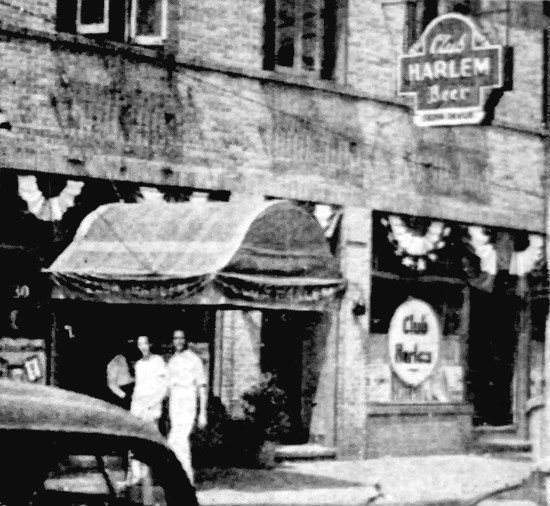
Club Harlem in 1940

In July 1940, Club Harlem, Little Belmont, the Paradise Club, and the Wonder Bar were targeted in a midnight raid by police officers, accompanied by the newly elected mayor, Tom Taggart, seeking proof of illegal gambling activities. (Note: Taggart began the action by calling 40 policemen into his office, strapping on a revolver and stating, "Come on, we're going places.") The police confiscated "three truckloads of gambling paraphernalia" and arrested 32 club owners and employees, then shut down the four clubs. The next day the clubs were open for business as usual. (Note: The mayor conducted a second raid two weeks later of the Wonder Bar, Little Belmont and Club Harlem. This raid found no gambling equipment or patrons at any of these clubs. Upon raiding the establishments and finding nothing, Taggart's comment was: "I heard these wise guys were going to try to open up again.")

In 1947, showman Larry Steele introduced an all-black revue called Smart Affairs to Club Harlem. The elaborate show, featuring 40 to 50 acts including comedians, singers, showgirls, chorus lines, and dance numbers, was headquartered at the club through 1970, and also toured throughout the United States and abroad between the 1940s and 1960s, including venues in San Juan, Puerto Rico, Adelaide, Australia, and Toronto, Canada. The budget for the "Smart Affairs" shows ran as high as US$35,000 per week. The shows were on a par with Broadway productions. Smart Affairs productions grossed between $400,000 and $500,000 annually by the early 1960s. Steele also founded the Sepia Revue and Beige Beauties chorus lines at the club. Entertainer Lola Falana was discovered by Sammy Davis, Jr. while working in Club Harlem's chorus line.

In 1951 Williams and his brother, Clifton Williams, brought in other partners, including Ben Alten of the Paradise Club. (Note: Williams needed a non-African-American partner as he had plans to expand the club; at the time, banks were not lending money to African Americans.) By 1954, Williams and Alten owned the Club Harlem and the Paradise Club, operating both under joint ownership. (Note: Pop Williams died in 1976. Alten continued to own the club until it was sold in 1987.) The club employed 200 people in 1964. Its busiest time was during the tourist season from mid June to Labor Day. Alten described the club's most profitable time as being between 1959 and 1977. On the weekends, between 20 and 25 buses from areas in the Northeastern United States arrived, bringing guests who wanted to see the club's shows.

By 1968, Williams began having difficulty booking some African-American entertainers into the venue. He wrote an open letter to baseball star Jackie Robinson, who had a regular column in the Pittsburgh Courier newspaper. The entertainers in question did not want to work at venues catering to African Americans. After the death of Pop Williams in 1976, Alten's new business partner was businessman Calvin Brock. Alten and Brock refurbished the club, but business was never as good as it had been in the past.

== Description ==
Club Harlem was outfitted with two lounges and a main showroom seating more than 900. A cocktail lounge had room for 400 guests, with continuous entertainment available. The club was equipped with seven bars; the front bar alone accommodated nearly 100 people. Guitarist Pat Martino recalled in his biography: "In the front room at Club Harlem you had two stages for two different groups. Willis Jackson would do forty minutes, and then Chris Columbo's band would do forty minutes. They'd split sets all night long. And in the large back room you had singers like Sammy Davis with an orchestra. That was an incredible place." Weekends at Club Harlem started on Friday night, with the two bands alternating sets; the music kept going until Monday morning.

== Shows ==
For more than 50 years, the Harlem was the place in Atlantic City to see the best shows, hear the best musicians and have the best time.

— The Philadelphia Inquirer, July 28, 1987

The club scheduled matinees, nighttime shows, late-night shows, and a 6 a.m. "breakfast show" during the summer tourist season. The music played from 10 p.m. Saturday night to 6 a.m. Monday morning. "Celebrities, politicians, and tourists" often arrived in the early morning hours after the clubs on the white side of town had closed, and white performers such as Frank Sinatra, Milton Berle, and Lenny Bruce would go up on stage.

Top-name black musicians also dropped by "to jam and develop their skills". Musician Kelly Swaggerty, who was with Tadd Dameron's band at the time, remembered a jam session with Clifford Brown, Art Farmer and Joe Gordon that began at the Paradise Club and was continued at Club Harlem as the musicians wanted to continue playing. (Note: A private recording of the performance still exists.) Long-time Atlantic City disc jockey Pinky Kravitz recalled that by 3 a.m., there were up to 1,000 people in line, waiting for the breakfast show to begin. In addition to the show itself, any celebrities sitting in the audience were called up to the stage and would perform.

Drummer Chris Columbo, who conducted the club's orchestra for 34 years, remembered that the early morning shows were the most vibrant because the other clubs in town were closed and many of those who were appearing at them were now at Club Harlem jamming with the club's musicians. Johnny Lynch was in charge of the house band of 14 musicians, which was integrated. The band was well regarded among musicians. It was said that if you were in the Club Harlem band for the summer, you were a fine musician. Young men who wanted to become professionals often quit their regular jobs in summer to play with the Lynch band.

The leading black entertainers of the day appeared at Club Harlem, including comedians Dick Gregory, George Kirby, Moms Mabley, and Slappy White; singers Cab Calloway, Billy Daniels, Billy Eckstine, Ella Fitzgerald, Billie Holiday, Lena Horne, Sarah Vaughan, Dinah Washington, and Ethel Waters; and jazz musicians Louis Armstrong, Count Basie, Nat King Cole, Wild Bill Davis, and Duke Ellington. Daniels first performed his signature song "That Old Black Magic" at Club Harlem in 1942. Guitarist Pat Martino has stated that as a younger man he would play at Smalls Paradise in New York City for six months and then perform in the summer at the Club Harlem. Racism, however, prohibited many of these performers from appearing at clubs on the south side of town, where white families lived. However, in the 1950s Frank Sinatra came from the 500 Club to Club Harlem to perform with Sammy Davis, Jr., and sang with Davis, a member of the Rat Pack, back at the 500 Club. Lonnie Smith recorded a live album, Move Your Hand, at Club Harlem in 1969. Even in its waning years in the 1970s, Club Harlem continued to attract contemporary black stars such as Harry Belafonte, Ray Charles, Aretha Franklin, Redd Foxx, Marvin Gaye, Leslie Uggams, and Dionne Warwick.

The shows at the club were choreographed by Larry Steele for many years, along with those of the nearby Paradise Club, and often featured "comedians dressed like clowns, plantation hands, and frumpy old ladies [telling] dirty jokes to start things off". A full chorus line called the Sepia Revue featured 12 showgirls dressed in "black high heels, skimpy, sequined dresses, long boas and feathered headgear" dancing with more and more abandon as the "red hot" house band backed them up. Another chorus line called Beige Beauties also performed artistic dance numbers. There was no applause at the club. Guests found long wooden sticks with wooden balls at the end called "table knockers" at their tables. Patrons were to hit the table with their knockers to indicate their appreciation of performances.

Not long after its closing, Alten, an owner of the club for 35 years, reminisced about the performers who brought the most guests to the club. He named Gladys Knight & the Pips and Sam Cooke as the two acts who brought the most business into Club Harlem. Alten said the club prevented fights when Sam Cooke performed there by using "Sold Out" signs, which got people to leave without trying to fight to get into the performances.

In the offseason, the club accommodated community fundraisers and teen talent shows.

== Final years and demolition ==
Club Harlem was the site of the 1972 Easter morning assassination of the Black Mafia's "Fat" Tyrone Palmer, in full view of a show audience estimated at 600 people. Four rival operatives entered the club and one shot Palmer in the face after the featured singer, Billy Paul, finished his opening song. Palmer's bodyguard and three women were killed in the melee that ensued, and 20 people were injured. Business dropped off after that.

The club went into a steep decline between the mid-1970s and mid-1980s as the introduction of casino gambling on the Atlantic City Boardwalk pulled business away from Club Harlem and other nightspots located streetside. In the winter of 1986 it was purchased by a developer for $200,000–well below its valuation of $673,000–and shuttered; it had last opened for two weeks in the summer of 1986; it was the last of Atlantic City's major golden age nightclubs still in operation. When the club closed for good, owner Alten made it clear that the closing was not due to unpaid bills; he referred to it as "going out with its face up". There had been an effort to sell the property for some years. After the sale, many people expressed a wish to save Club Harlem. Atlantic City's mayor at the time, James Usry, was among those who wanted to preserve the club and took part in a private effort to do so.

In December 1992 a nor'easter struck the building, and the building was torn down. Fans retrieved the interior furnishings and vintage photographs before the demolition in the hopes of displaying them in a future museum. A historical marker on Kentucky Avenue commemorates Club Harlem. The building site is now a parking lot where the Kentucky Avenue Renaissance Festival is held each summer.

== Legacy ==
The African American Heritage Museum of Southern New Jersey, founded by Ralph Hunter, and the Noyes Arts Garage at Stockton University are in possession of the mementos rescued from the club, including "costumes, posters, ashtrays, the neon sign", and a set of red padded leather double doors illustrated with full-size drawings of Pop Williams and Sammy Davis Jr. The museum has lent the artifacts to a traveling exhibition that appeared at the Atlantic City Public Library in 2010 under the name "A Pictorial of Club Harlem and the Way We Were". The collection, along with more than 100 historical photographs and newspaper articles, has also traveled to Philadelphia, Washington, D.C., Baltimore, and Newark.

On Kentucky Avenue – The Atlantic City Club Harlem Revue, created by Adam and Jeree Wade, who each performed at Club Harlem in different decades, made its New York City debut during Black History Month 2013. It plays every few months at Stage 72.

The club served as one of the filming locations for the 1980 film Atlantic City.

== Sources ==
- Catalano, Nick (2001). Clifford Brown: The Life and Art of the Legendary Jazz Trumpeter. Oxford University Press. ISBN 978-0-19-514400-0.
- Griffin, S.P. (2006). Philadelphia's Black Mafia: A Social and Political History. Springer Science & Business Media. ISBN 0-306-48132-4.
- Martino, Pat (2011). Here and Now!: The Autobiography of Pat Martino. Backbeat Books. ISBN 978-1-61713-079-3.
- Morgan, Daniel B. (2014). Last Stage Manager Standing. Page Publishing Inc. ISBN 978-1-63417-071-0.
- Raheem, Turiya S. A. (7 December 2009). Growing Up in the Other Atlantic City: Wash's and the Northside. Xlibris. ISBN 978-1-4500-0756-6.
- Simon, Bryant (2004). Boardwalk of Dreams: Atlantic City and the Fate of Urban America. Oxford University Press. ISBN 978-0-19-803744-6.
- Sokolic, William H.; Ruffolo, Robert E. Jr. (2006). Atlantic City Revisited. Arcadia Publishing. ISBN 978-0-7385-4904-0.
- Waltzer, Jim; Wilk, Tom (2001). Tales of South Jersey: Profiles and Personalities. Rutgers University Press. ISBN 0-8135-3007-5.
- Willis, Cheryl M. (2016). Tappin' at the Apollo: The African American Female Tap Dance Duo Salt and Pepper. McFarland. ISBN 978-1-4766-2315-3.
