= Peg Leg Bates =

American entertainer (1907–1998)

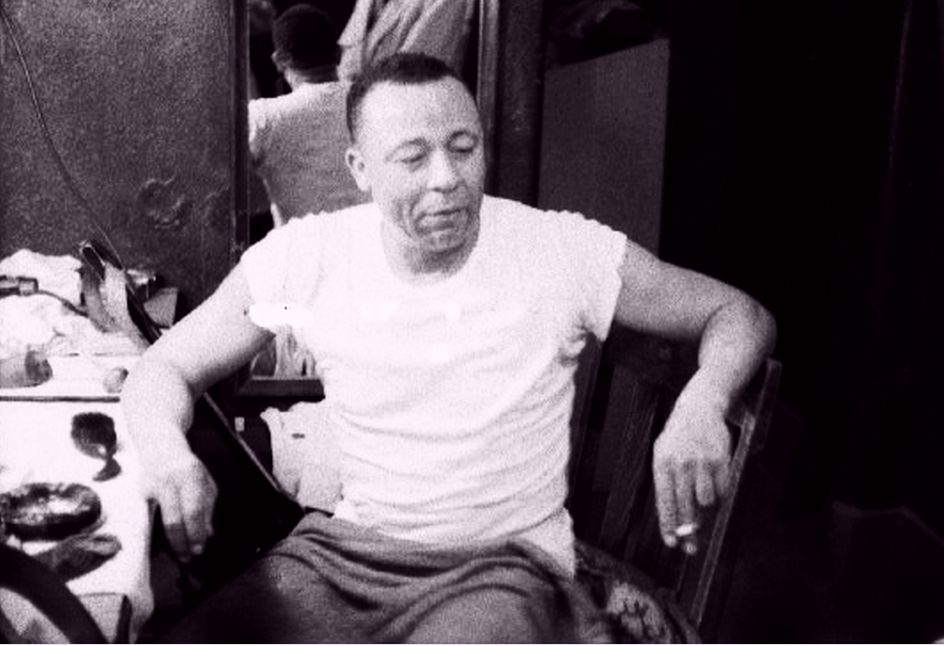
- Bates in 1954
- Born: Clayton Bates; October 11, 1907; Fountain Inn, South Carolina, US
- Died: December 8, 1998 (aged 91); Fountain Inn, South Carolina
- Occupation: Tap dancer
- Awards: Order of the Palmetto

Clayton "Peg Leg" Bates (October 11, 1907 – December 6, 1998) was an African-American entertainer from Fountain Inn, South Carolina, United States.

== Life and career ==
=== Early life ===
Peg Leg Bates was born Clayton Bates on October 10, 1907, in Fountain Inn, South Carolina, the son of Rufus and Emma W Stewart Bates. His mother was a sharecropper. By the age of five, Bates was dancing on the streets of Fountain Inn for pennies and nickels; he lost a leg at the age of 12 in a cotton gin accident. His uncle, Wit, made his crude first "peg leg" after returning home from World War I and finding his nephew disabled. Bates subsequently taught himself to tap dance with a wooden peg leg. By the time he was 15, Bates was again adept enough at dancing to enter amateur talent shows, working his way up to employment through the Theater Owners Booking Association, which booked entertainers for African-American theaters in the US.

=== Career ===
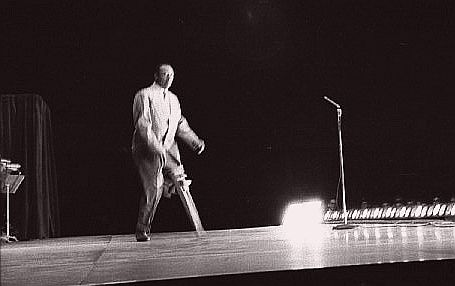
Bates performing in 1954, showing his peg leg

At 20, Bates was dancing on Broadway. In the early 1940s, at the Paradise Club in Atlantic City, New Jersey, his "Jet Plane" finale, in which he leaped over the stage, landed on his wooden leg, and then executed a series of backward hops accompanied by trumpet blasts from the band, saw his leg puncture the wooden stage floor. It took half an hour to pull him out. After that, the stage floor was reinforced with metal sheeting. Bates performed on The Ed Sullivan Show at least 22 times, and had two command performances before the King and Queen of the United Kingdom in 1936 and then again in 1938. During a USO hospital tour, he partnered with vaudeville tap dancer Dixie Roberts, who said "he danced better with one leg than anyone else could with two." He was part of the first Louis Armstrong tour of Britain in the mid-1950s.

=== Peg Leg Bates Country Club ===
He owned and operated the Peg Leg Bates Country Club in Kerhonkson, New York, from 1951 to 1987, along with his wife Alice E. Bates. This made Bates the first black resort owner in Ulster County in the Catskill Mountains, the famous Borscht Belt of Jewish resorts, hotels, and bungalow colonies. He began with four rooms at his country club resort; by 1985, there were 110 units for guests. He leased the resort in 1989, due to the death of his wife in 1987.

=== Later life ===
Though Bates retired from show business in 1989, he still performed for various groups, including senior citizens, children and disabled individuals. He was also active in the local Ellenville Lions Club, and during the last 10 years of his life he traveled regularly to schools, senior citizen centers, and nursing homes showing a video about his life and talking about his life experiences. He also helped found a local Senior Citizens Center in the Ellenville / Kerhonkson area.

Bates was the subject of the 1992 documentary The Dancing Man: Peg Leg Bates, produced by Hudson West Productions, directed by Dave Davidson, and broadcast on PBS.

== Death ==
He collapsed on December 6, 1998 (at the age of 91) on his way to church. He had performed at an award ceremony in his honor at Hillcrest High School and received the Order of the Palmetto.

== Family ==
Bates had a wife, Alice E., and a daughter, Melodye Bates-Holden.

== Legacy ==
The citizens of Fountain Inn erected a life-size statue that can be viewed in front of the city hall and Robert Quillen's library.

There are signs at the entrance of the city saying "Peg Leg Bates' home town."

U.S. Route 209 in Ulster County, New York has been named the "Clayton Peg Leg Bates Memorial Highway".

He was the subject of the children's book Knockin' On Wood: Starring Peg Leg Bates, written and illustrated by Lynne Barasch, and published in 2012.

== Honors ==
In 1991, Bates was awarded the Flo-Bert Award for being an outstanding figure in the field of tap dancing.

In December 1998, Bates performed at an award ceremony at Hillcrest High School in his honor for receiving the Order of the Palmetto, the highest civilian awarded by the state in his hometown of Fountain Inn, South Carolina.

Bates was inducted into the International Tap Dance Hall of Fame in 2005.
