= George Jacobs (valet) =

American valet and memoirist (1927–2013)

George Emmanuel Jacobs (April 19, 1927 – December 28, 2013) was an American memoirist and valet. Jacobs was the valet of the Hollywood agent Swifty Lazar in the 1950s, before being poached from Lazar by the singer and actor Frank Sinatra. Jacobs wrote a well received memoir, Mr. S: My Life with Frank Sinatra (co-author William Stadiem; HarperEntertainment, 2003, ISBN 978-0060515164) that chronicled his time in Sinatra's employment, from 1953 until his dismissal by Sinatra in 1968.

According to his obituary in The New York Times, Jacobs was born in New Orleans, Louisiana, then moved to Los Angeles, California, after serving in the U.S. Navy. He reportedly worked as a valet for Bill Cosby and Steve McQueen after Sinatra severed his long-time employment over a misunderstanding.

Jacobs was portrayed by actor Tyrees Allen in the 1998 film The Rat Pack.
