= Peter Cusack (musician) =

English artist and musician

Peter Cusack is an English artist and musician who is a member of CRiSAP (Creative Research in Sound Arts Practice), and is a research staff member and founding member of the London College of Communication in the University of the Arts London. He was a founding member and director of the London Musicians' Collective.

He is best known as a member of the avant garde musical quartet, Alterations (1978–1986; with Steve Beresford, David Toop, and Terry Day), and the creator of field and wildlife recording-based albums including:

- Where Is the Green Parrot? (1999) with tracks like "Toy Shop (Two Small Boys Go Shopping)" and "Siren", which are just as advertised.
- Day for Night (2000), with Max Eastley. This features "duets" between Eastley's kinetic sculpture and Cusack's field recordings.
- Baikal Ice (2003), featuring tracks like "Banging Holes In Ice" and "Floating Icicles Rocked By Waves" and "Falling In".

Cusack has been involved in a wide range of projects throughout his career. Several of his pieces have been reviewed in Leonardo Music Journal, the annual music Journal published by MIT Press. He has also curated an album for Leonardo Music Journal.

He is currently research fellow on the Engineering and Physical Sciences Research Council's multidisciplinary 'Positive Soundscapes Project'.

== Musical interests ==
Cusack is particularly interested in environmental sound and acoustic ecology. He has examined the sound properties of areas such as Lake Baikal, Siberia, and the Azerbaijan oil fields, and is interested in how sounds change as people migrate and as technology changes.

In 1998, Cusack started the "Your Favorite London Sound" project. The goal is to find out what London noises are found appealing by people who live in London. This was so popular that it has been repeated in Chicago, Beijing, and other cities. He is involved in the "Sound & The City" art project using sounds from Beijing in October 2005.

Cusack's Sounds From Dangerous Places is a project to collect sounds from sites which have sustained major environmental damage. Sites that Cusack is working on include Chernobyl, the Azerbaijan oil fields, and areas around controversial dams on the Tigris and Euphrates river systems in south east Turkey.

Cusack's performances are a central part of the book Haunted Weather: Music, Silence, and Memory (Toop, 2004) by his old collaborator and respected music critic and author, David Toop. Toop investigates the use of environmental sound and electronic instruments in experimental music in his book.

== Other performances ==
With clarinetist Simon Mayo, he formed the duo known as "A Touch of the Sun". His first "major" recording was part of Fred Frith's 1974 record, "Guitar Solos".

He was one of the first to play the bouzouki in England, which gained him the respect of London's musical avant garde.

As a musician, he has collaborated with artists such as Clive Bell, Nic Collins, Alterations, Chris Cutler, Max Eastley, Evan Parker, Hugh Davies, Annette Krebs and Eastern Mediterranean singer Viv Corringham.

A live performance with Nicolas Collins was released as "A Host, of Golden Daffodils" in 1999.

== Activities related to music ==
He co-founded an artist-owned record label called "Bead Records" which has released many previously unavailable pieces in 1972. It had released more than 30 albums, as of 2007.

In 1975 Derek Bailey, Steve Beresford, Max Boucher, Paul Burwell, Jack Cooke, Peter Cusack, Hugh Davies, Madelaine and Martin Davidson, Richard Leigh, Evan Parker, John Russell, David Toop, Philipp Wachsmann and Colin Wood formed the journal MUSICS, later described as "an impromental experivisation arts magazine".

Cusack produces the monthly radio program "Vermilion Sounds" with Isobel Clouter. Vermilion Sounds explores environmental sounds and is broadcast by Resonance FM in London. John Levack Drever, writing in Soundscape, comments:

Of significant note is the work of Peter Cusack and Isobel Clouter (from the British Library Sound Archive who we now welcome onto the UKISC Management Committee), who have done a sterling job producing Vermilion Sounds—a weekly radio show for Resonance FM...

== Other projects ==
- Soundlines: City of London Festival educational project on music and environmental sound in East London schools (April to November 2003).
- Baku, 5 Quarters at the University of Baku, Azerbaijan. This was a collaboration with Swiss video artist Ursula Biemann in 2004.
- Urban Grime, exhibition at the Museum of London Sept 2003 to Jan 2004
- Send+Receive Festival performance & workshops, Winnipeg, Canada 2004:
- LMC Guitar Festival performances, Museum of Garden History, London 2004
- Frère Jacques et autres pièces à Francis: Expositions. 1997. Saint-Fons, with Ron Haselden, a British artist living in the French town of Brizard, in Brittany. This was a well-known interactive multimedia piece featuring the song Frère Jacques.

== Selected recordings ==
- Your Favourite London Sounds 1998–2001, Peter Cusack, Resonance (2002)
- Day For Night, Peter Cusack, Max Eastley, Paradigm (2000). The compilation of recordings from a 25-year collaboration.
- Interruptions, Terry Day, EMANEM 4125; Cusack plays on two tracks, recordings from 1978 to 1981.
- Voila Enough! 1979–1981 (Atavistic ALP239CD) – CD release of the group Alterations (Steve Beresford, Peter Cusack, Terry Day, David Toop)
- Baikal Ice, Peter Cusack, RER Megacorp / IODA (Spring 2003)
- Where is the Green Parrot?, Peter Cusack, RER Megacorp / IODA (1999)
- The Horse Was Alive, The Cow Was Dead, Peter Cusack album with 46 tracks
- Butlers Wharf, Peter Cusack
- Ghosts & Monsters: Technology & Personality in Contemporary Music, Composer: Robert Ashley, Frieder Butzmann, John Cage, Cornelius Cardew, Henning Christiansen, et al., Conductor: Christian von Borries, Guy Protheroe, Performers: Peter Cusack, Margaret Leng Tan, Jerry Hunt, Shelley Hirsch, Berliner Philharmoniker, Emf Media (2 May 2000) includes an extract from a Host, of Golden Daffodils – Nicolas Collins, Peter Cusack
- Haunted Weather, assorted artists, Staubgold Germany, 25 May 2004, includes "Flight Path Trace" by Peter Cusack (companion CD to Ghosts and Monsters: Technology and Personality in Contemporary Music, Leonardo Music Journal 8 (1998), Leonardo / MIT Press, 1998)
- Not Necessarily "English Music": A collection of experimental music from Great Britain, 1960–1977, curated by David Toop, Leonard Music Journal CD Series Volume 11, includes Geese recorded in 1974 by Peter Cusack and Simon Mayo (A Touch of the Sun), the companion CD to 2001 Volume of Leonardo Music Journal, MIT Press, 2001.
- Nightjars and Roe Deer, and Squabble (both from CD to Musicworks #59, Peter Cusack) included in Songs Soaring, (René van Peer, catalogue for festival Whistling in the Dark/Pfeifen in Walde, organised by Matthias Osterwold and Nicolas Collins in Podewil, Berlin (Germany), 9 to 18 September 1994, organised by Matthias Osterwold and Nicolas Collins in Podewil, Berlin (Germany), 9 to 18 September 1994, pub. by Volker Straebel and Matthias Osterwold, in association with Nicolas Collins, Valerian Maly and Elke Moltrecht. Distribution through Podewil and Maly Verlag, 1994.)
- TECHNO MIT STÖRUNGEN, an album recorded at festival "music unlimited" at Alter Schlachthof Wels, Austria, 11 November 1995. The album features Peter Cusack playing "bousouki & interactive birds"
- Operet, Peter Cusack and Viv Corringham, Rere121
- Sounds from dangerous places book with audio CDs

== Curations ==
- Interpreting the Soundscape, curated by Peter Cusack, contributions by Tonya Wimmer, Andrea Polli and Joe Gilmore, Jacob Kirkegaard, Chris Watson, Rafal Flejter, Chris DeLaurenti, Christina Kubisch, Charles Stankievech, Sonic Postcards, Yannick Dauby and Pascal Battus. LMJ CD Series Volume 16 accompanying the 2006 Volume of Leonardo Music Journal, Leonardo Music Journal Volume 16 (2006), MIT press, 2006.

== Selected publications ==
- "Ghosts and Monsters": Contributors' Notes", Alexander Abramovitch Krejn, Christian von Borries, John Cage, Andrew Culver, John Tilbury, Paul de Marinis, Robert Ashley, Henning Christiansen, Alvin Lucier, Peter Cusack, Shelley Hirsch, Jerry Hunt, Michael Schell, Frieder Butzmann, Michael Snow, Leonardo Music Journal, Vol. 8, Ghosts and Monsters: Technology and Personality in Contemporary Music (1998), pp. 64–74, MIT Press, 1998.
- The Positive Soundscape Project: A re-evaluation of environmental sound, Mags Adams, Angus Carlyle, Peter Cusack, Bill Davies, Ken Hume, Paul Jennings, Chris Plack, Research Proposal.
- Dialogue, Peter Cusack, Soundscape—The Journal of Acoustic Ecology 1 (2) p8, 2000.
