= Peter Cusack =

Peter Cusack may refer to:

- Peter Cusack (musician), British musician
- Peter Cusack (rugby league) (born 1977), Australian rugby league footballer
