= Terry Fox (artist) =

American performance artist (1943–2008)

- Fox in 1967
- Born: May 10, 1943; Seattle, Washington, U.S.
- Died: October 14, 2008 (aged 65); Cologne, Germany
- Education: Cornish College of the Arts (1961); Accademia di Belle Arti di Roma (1962)
- Known for: Performance art, Video art, Sound art, Sculpture

Terry Alan Fox (May 10, 1943 – October 14, 2008) was an American conceptual artist known for his work in performance art, video art and sculpture. He was one of the first generation conceptual artists and was a central participant in West Coast conceptual art movements of the late 1960s and early 1970s. Fox was active in the San Francisco Bay Area and Europe, living and working in Liège, Belgium in the later part of his life.

== Early life ==
Fox was born in 1943 in Seattle, Washington, United States. At the age of seventeen in 1960, he was diagnosed with Hodgkin's disease, a type of cancer that affects the lymphatic system. Several of his artworks referenced the cycles of illness and wellness. He studied art at Cornish College of the Arts (1961) at night, while working at Boeing Aircraft. He continued his studies at Accademia di Belle Arti di Roma (1962).

== Biography ==
Fox was an important figure in post-minimal sculpture, conceptual art, performance, and video art on the West Coast. Before permanently moving to Europe, he was based in San Francisco in the late 1960s and 1970s and was associated with the underground art scene. Fox moved often and lived in the following cities: Rome (1962), San Francisco (1963–1966, late 1968–1978), Paris (1967–early 1968, 1972), Naples (1983–1984), New York City (1978–1979). In 1980, he moved to Europe permanently and eventually settled in Liège, Belgium.

Fox died in Cologne, Germany on October 14, 2008.

== Work ==
In 1963, Fox relocated to San Francisco where he created paintings inspired by Arthur Rimbaud until 1967. He was working at the post office at this time in preparation for traveling abroad. In 1966, he produced a series of "black mirror paintings"; these were made by spraying opaque black paint on clear glass, effectively producing a mirror surface. The black paint was hand etched with faint words and scratches. Occasionally blue paint would be applied to the scratched areas on the back side of the glass such that viewers would see themselves reflected in the black mirrors.

In 1967 Fox moved to Amsterdam where he continued painting; then moved on to create his first "actions". These performative works were inspired by the Fluxus movement. The following year he relocated to Paris where he began to produce process-oriented sculptures, "street actions", as well as two dimensional works on paper such as drawings and frottages from various surfaces. Fox collaborated with the painter William T. Wiley on the process piece, Dust Exchange, which he considered to be his first work of sculpture.

He then traveled back to San Francisco in 1969 where he produced a series of public art events titled Pubic Theater. The following year Reese Palley Gallery presented the first solo exhibition of his work, which included Fox's first sound art works. Also in 1970, Fox collaborated on a performance, entitled Isolation Unit, with the German artist, Joseph Beuys. This was presented at the Kunstakademie Düsseldorf (where Beuys was teaching at that time); a sound work was produced in conjunction with the performance and published in the form of an EP record.

In 1971, Fox was awarded a grant from the National Endowment for the Arts which he used to purchase a Portapak analogue videotape recorder and sound equipment. He was largely self taught in video art.

He produced several works (environments, performances, sculptures, drawings) over an eight-year period from 1971 to 1978 based on the theme of the configuration of the Chartres labyrinth.

He was in remission of Hodgkin's Disease by 1972 having had major surgery earlier that year. He began making works for Documenta 5, in Kassel, based on the Chartres Cathedral labyrinth. For the resulting drawings, performances and sculptures including Yield, he performed a series "of continuous trancelike actions that took place over three days in an elaborate built environment. While viewers watched from a balcony, Fox ritualistically performed such activities as creating skeletal outlines on the floor in flour, blowing smoke, and baking bread."

In 1973, the Berkeley University Art Museum presented the first one-person museum show of Fox's work. The exhibition curator, Brenda Richardson, wrote: "The impact of Fox's work is total: either you see it not at all, or you see it through and through, to its center, to its heart beat. It has no ambiguity; it is black and white not only in color but also in concept; Fox installations are stark and pure, and leave no room for equivocation." He would later have another solo show at the same museum in 1987.

The following year Fox received a grant to produce Children's Tapes from the National Endowment for the Arts. The series of videos were presented at the Everson Museum. Documentation of these works were later exhibited in a 2024 solo exhibition, titled All These Different Things are Sculpture, at Artists Space in New York City.

In 1985, the Kunstraum Munich presented a solo show; and in 1988, he created a permanent outdoor installation at Via Toscanella in Florence, Italy. This was followed, in 1989, with a show of sound works at the Het Appollohuis in Eindhoven.

In 1996, Fox was awarded with a grant from the Pollock-Krasner Foundation. This was followed, in 1998, with a book and CD on his sound works, Terry Fox Works with Sound, published in conjunction with the Stadtgalerie Saarbrüken. In 2000, another book on his work was published, Terry Fox: 30 Years of Speaking and Writing about Art, published in conjunction with the Gesellschaft für Aktuelle Kunst, in Bremen.

In 2019, eleven years after his death, a series of events titled Resonance, also referred to as The Terry Fox Extravaganza, were presented at eight different venues over the course of two months, beginning at Grace Cathedral.

== Significant works ==
Fox performing Levitation, 1970

Levitation – In 1970, Fox produced an extended-duration sculptural performance, Levitation, that addressed the artist's emotions and physical symptoms of his Hodgkin lymphoma, while also addressing notions of wellness and health. To prepare, Fox fasted for days before the performance. During the performance, he lay on a mound of dirt for six hours attempting to levitate while holding long, flexible tubes of elemental fluids, as "a metaphor for transfiguration". While focused on leaving contact with the earth and "rising up into the air," he felt that he had "achieved a state of levitation that lasted more than two hours." The artist believed this was his strongest work of sculpture, stating that the "whole room was energized".

Fox performed the work alone in a darkened room at the Richmond Art Center. After the performance, spectators could see the four tubes of fluids, water, blood, urine and milk, as well as the concave imprint of his body left in the dirt. The critic Peter Plagens, described the work in Artforum as a "skeptical, passionate, honest" attempt to "charge the space" with energy and possibility. Comparing Levitation to Fox's earlier Hospital piece, he described both works as a poetic narrative of "Fox's struggle with his imperfect body, which is the artist's struggle with the world, which is our struggle with our treacherous selves."

Terry Fox, Instruments to be Played by the Movement of the Earth, 1987, installation detail

Instruments to be Played by the Movement of the Earth (1987) – This time-based sonic installation was presented at the Capp Street Project in San Francisco. In the article, Rethinking Acoustic Ecology: Sound Art and Environment, Gascia Ouzounian, writes that the installation embodies an acoustic ecology where the environment itself is "seen as possessing agency and voice." Consisting of a scattering of objects designed to be "acoustically activated" by the subtle movements arising from Earth itself. Rather than recording environmental sounds, Fox created an "unfixed" situation with "instruments" that created sound in response to seismic activity and earthly vibrations which are common in the San Francisco Bay Area. Fox wrote of the installation:

"These instruments are to be played only in this way. No sound in the absence of vibration. Potential sound. The sounds created by the instruments will correspond to the sounds heard during an earthquake; objects falling, rolling across the floor, rumbling, glasses and plates breaking, glasses shattering, an alarm going off, etc."

Thus the work was held in tension between silence, the expectation for possible sound and actual sound.

== Exhibitions ==
Fox has been included in numerous international solo and group exhibitions including the documenta 5, Kassel, 1975 Whitney Biennial and 1984 Venice Biennale. He had two major exhibitions in Berkeley, his first solo museum show curated by Brenda Richardson in 1973, and one in 1985 organized around the body of works owned by the Berkeley Art Museum organized by Constance Lewallen. His retrospective solo exhibition was organized by the Kunsthalle Fridericianum, Kassel in 2003.

== Works ==
=== Performance art ===
Performance art
Year	Title	Type	Location	Notes
1968–1969	Public Theater	Events and posters in outdoor locations	San Francisco Bay Area	
1970	Isolation Unit	Action/performance with Joseph Beuys	Kunstakademie Düsseldorf, Düsseldorf, Germany	
1970	Wall Push	Action/performance	Museum of Conceptual Art, San Francisco, California	
1970	Defoliation Piece	Action/performance	University Art Museum, Berkeley, California	
1970	Levitation	Action/performance, installation	Richmond Art Center, Richmond, California	
1973	Yield	Action/performance, installation	University Art Museum, Berkeley, California	

=== Filmography ===
Filmography
Year	Title	Type	Runtime	Notes
1970	Rain	Super 8 film, black and white	3 minutes	
1970	Sweat	Super 8 film, black and white	3 minutes	
1970	Breath	Super 8 film, color	3 minutes	
1970	Tonguings	Video	30 minutes	
1970	Rakes Progress	Video	30 minutes	
1971	Turgescent Sex	Video	40 minutes	
1971	Needles Punctured	Film	30 minutes	
1971	Clutch	Video	50 minutes	
1972	Washing	Film	15 minutes	
1972	Azione per un Bacile	Super 8 film, color	30 minutes	
1972	The fire...	Video, color	30 minutes	
1973	Incision	Video	15 minutes	
1974	Children's Tapes	Video, black and white	30 minutes	
1976	Timbre	Video of performance	30 minutes	CaVideomera work by Al Wong
1976	Lunar Rambles	Video, color	33 minutes	

== Discography ==
- Berlino\Rallentando. LP record. Eindhoven, The Netherlands: Het Appollohuis, 1989.
- Isolation Unit (Terry Fox: Pipes; Joseph Beuys: Seeds). (Extended play record, produced by the artists), 1970. Edition 500.
- Linkage. LP record with text by Martin Kunz. Lucerne, Switzerland: Kunstmuseum, 1982.
- Mag Magazine #3: Joan La Barbara/Terry Fox. Audiocassette edition. Vienna, Austria: Galerie Grita Insam, 1979.
- Revolutions per Minute. One cut on record of artists' sound works. New York: Ronald Feldman Fine Arts, 1982.
- The Labyrinth Scored for the Purrs of 11 Different Cats. Audiocassette. Eindhoven, The Netherlands: Het Appollohuis, 1989.

== Bibliography ==
- Richardson, Brenda. Terry Fox. Berkeley: University Art Museum, University of California, 1973.
- Foley, Suzanne. Space Time Sound, Conceptual Art in the San Francisco Bay Area: The 1970s. San Francisco: San Francisco Museum of Modern Art, 1981. ISBN 0-295-95879-0
- Albright, Thomas. Art of the San Francisco Bay Area, 1945 – 1980. Berkeley: University of California Press, 1985. ISBN 0-520-05193-9, ISBN 978-0-520-05193-5
- University of Massachusetts Amherst, University Gallery. In site: five conceptual artists from the Bay Area: Terry Fox, Howard Fried, David Ireland, Paul Kos, Tom Marioni: University Gallery, Fine Arts Center, University of Massachusetts Amherst, February 2 March 17, 1990. Amherst: University Gallery, University of Massachusetts Amherst, 1990.
- Von Wiese, Stephan and Fricke, Christiane. Terry Fox: Objects (Texts) / Drawings (Texts), Galerie Löhrl, Mönchengladbach, Germany. 1991.
- Fox, Terry, Eva Schmidt, Matthias Osterwold, Bern Schulz; Terry Fox: Works with Sound. Kehrer; 2003, ISBN 3-933257-04-2
- Phillips, Glenn, ed. California Video: Artists and Histories. Los Angeles: Getty Research Institute and J. Paul Getty Museum, 2008, ISBN 978-0-89236-922-5
