= Your Favourite London Sounds =

Studio album by Peter Cusack
- Released: November 2001
- Recorded: London, England
- Genre: Field recording; aural collage
- Length: 73:46
- Label: London Musicians Collective
- Compiler: Peter Cusack

Peter Cusack chronology
| Strings with Evan Parker (2001) | Your Favourite London Sounds (2001) | Baikal Ice (Spring 2003) (2001) |

Your Favourite London Sounds is an album compiled by English musician Peter Cusack and released in November 2001 by the London Musicians Collective (LMC). It collects 40 field recordings of sounds around the English city of London, most of which were recorded by Cusack. The project originated when the LMC hosted a temporary radio station for the 1998 Meltdown Festival, which Cusack used to ask festival goers and listeners what their favourite 'London sound' was. He received hundreds of responses, many of which were varied and often personal.

The sounds on the recording are highly diverse and vary between outdoor and indoor sounds, some of which are famous and some of which are more atypical. Several sounds are specific to London while others are broader. On release, the album received critical acclaim, including being named the week's best CD by The Guardian, and inspired radio and newspaper commentary. Cusack commented that it received more attention than his musical work. Ultimately, the London project was the first in Cusack's larger Favourite Sounds Project, which visited other cities across the world.

== Background and recording ==
As part of John Peel's Meltdown Festival in June 1998, the London Musicians Collective (LMC) launched and ran a temporary radio station, Resonance 107.3 FM, over four weeks. It was the first ever London station dedicated to radio art, and later evolved into the artist-run Resonance FM. The LMC and particularly the member Peter Cusack, an improvisational musician, used Resonance 107.3 FM as an opportunity to undertake research, asking festival goers and listeners to send in or tell of their "favourite London sound". This formed the basis of a programme, London Soundscape. Cusack received hundreds of responses, and then travelled around London to capture all the relevant sounds himself, providing hours of raw material.

There was no overwhelming "favourite London sound" to emerge from the replies, with few people offering the same answer as anyone else. Many of the selections were surprisingly personal, and varied between outdoor and indoor sounds (such as post hitting a doormat). Cusack was surprised by how considered and largely serious the answers were, as well as how detailed and specific they could be. He found this "especially encouraging", saying: "It has been said in soundscape circles that because of ever increasing noise we are losing the ability to hear. I think this is nonsense. We may find it pretty difficult to talk or think about sound but we certainly hear it, including the details within all the noise." He expressed surprise at minor details that participants often included in their answers, ones which "may not be sonically apparent but which for them were important." He believed such sounds slowly gain personal significance to those who "travel the same route everyday". The sound of Big Ben was the most popular choice, while some surprising picks included arcade machines and traffic, but a large number of responses offered a collection of sounds rather than an individual one.

Realised in 2001, Your Favourite London Sounds is a CD based on responses from the questionnaire, featuring 40 examples of London sounds given as choices. Some of the recordings are the same as those which debuted on the 1998 radio station. Cusack compiled and edited the disc and recorded 35 of its tracks; the others were recorded by Matthias Krispert ("Brixton Station"), Tom Wallace ("Bus Pressure"), Bunny Schendler ("Euston Main Line Railway Station"), Clive Bell ("Tottenham Hotspurs Football Club, White Hart Lane") and Syngen Brown ("LRT Transformer, Putney").

== Contents ==
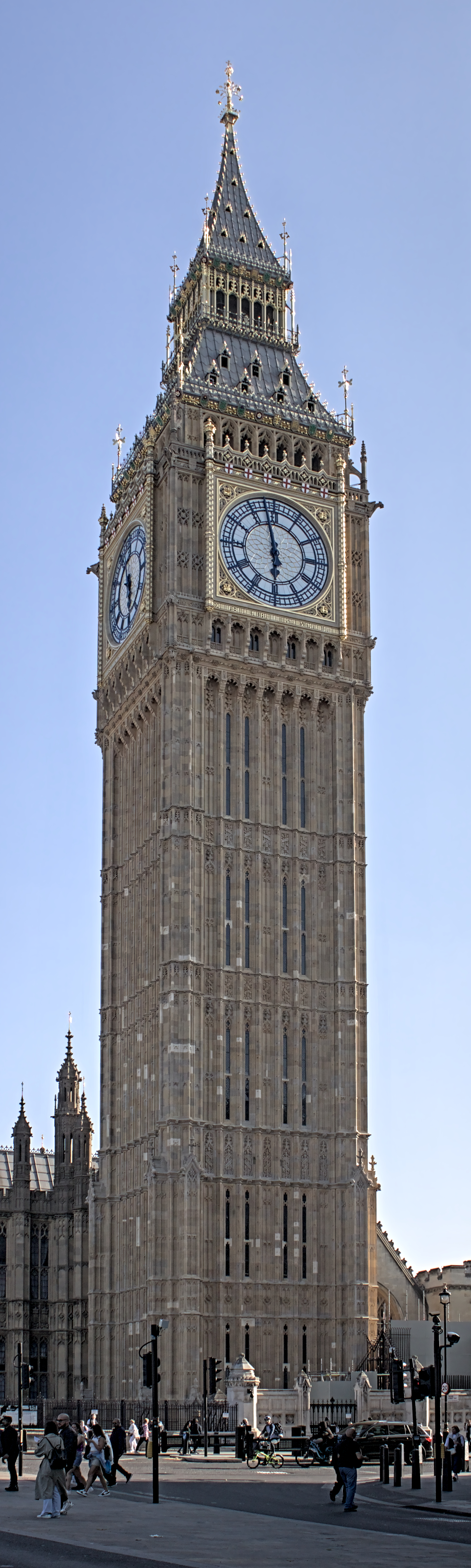
The disc opens with the sound of Big Ben, the most popular choice.

According to The Los Angeles Times writer Jill Lawless, Your Favourite London Sounds is an aural collage of London's distinctive soundscape, one which "has inspired Londoners to close their eyes and listen to their city." Author David M. Frohlich writes the project demonstrates that the favourite sounds of London are "highly idiosyncratic, and just as likely to include man-made sounds as natural sounds", while Lawless said the release "confirms Londoners' intense and idiosyncratic relationship with the urban soundscape." The subjects are diverse, ranging from frying onions, "rain on skylight while lying in bed", "the call to prayer from an east London mosque", double-decker buses, coffee makers, a voicemail message, a bicycle crossing a canal towpath, a hissing bus door, a noisy street market, birds, traffic, taxis, trains, geese, wailing sirens, humming power plants, lapping rivers and "electronic bleeps at supermarket checkouts." Kenneth Goldsmith opines that the project provides "an odd way to think about a city", while according to John L. Walters, the release is "not that outlandish" as many of Cusack's prior albums, including Where Is the Green Parrot? (1999), similarly include lengthy field recordings.

Some sounds are specific to London, such as the London Underground sounds (such as the "mind the gap" announcement) and the bell on the 73 Bus. Cusack said many people "mentioned bus sounds – but not just any bus. It had to be the No. 73 bus, or the No. 12 bus. It was much more personal than I was expecting." He believed that different parts of the world sound very different to each other one part of the world, adding: "On the London Underground, the way the 'mind the gap' echoes down the tunnel comes to you in such a London way, you can't fail to know where you are when you hear it." As Goldsmith describes, some sounds captured in language-laden locations (such as coffee shops and markets) catch locals in conversation, bringing "a specific local flavour to the tracks", while other sounds are not often associated with cities, including rolling thunder and "the unaccompanied chirping of birds". Several sounds are presented with brief descriptions, which Goldsmith says gives them "more poetic weight".

Lawless says that in addition to "predictable natural sounds," such as a fountain, blackbirds, and rising and falling barges moored in the Thames, there are less predictable sounds and several "extremely delicate and specific" ones, such as bicycle wheels riding over "loose concrete slabs" on a specific towpath, while others are more generic, including turnstiles moving on entry to a football game. She also notes the inclusion of several endangered sounds, such as "the slamming of old-fashioned train doors, some of the few not yet replaced by mechanical sliding doors." According to David Toop, sounds vary from famous (Big Ben and "mind the gap"), social (a club queue and Dalston Market), highly personal (a phone message), "universally shared soundmarks" ("post through letterbox", "key in door") and unusual "ear-of-the-musician" answers. Toop also characterises some sounds as possessing "a distinct air of cinema futurism", citing the "disembodied announcements echoing in public space, polyglot languages overhead on the transport system, impersonal reminders of heightened security in the beleaguered city, ageing machinery grinding toward obsolesce, its tortured wails a taunting reminder of our financially draining dependence on clockwork history."

The disc opens with the sound of Big Ben, the most popular choice, which was captured at street level. Cusack's favourite sound is "a nightingale singing against the hum of an electricity substation", admiring the juxtaposition between "the birdsong and the crass, everyday urban hum." He also singled out the sounds of Brick Lane for clearly presenting the area's strong Bangladeshi community. Toop's own choices were the spatial sounds of distant emergency sirens at night and the high-pitched croaks of swifts, whose appearances throughout the year provoke "seasonal nostalgia". Drummer Charles Hayward's choice was "the Deptford Grid electricity sub-station at the edge of the Thames, a saturating drone washed by waves from the river." Hayward admired how people can walk through the overtones, and appreciates "the strange conjunction of that and the sounds of the river, and the sounds of people walking through the pebbles." The sound of an espresso machine was described by Walters as "a delicious, drawn-out sequence of clunks and drips, hissing and explosive boiling recorded in close-up, fetishistic detail"; it is introduced by its nominator as "not specifically a London sound". On the track "Deptford Market", Cusack is heard explaining to a woman that he is recording "all the clanging as you take all the stuff down."

== Release and reception ==
Professional ratings
Review scores
| Source | Rating |
|---|---|
| The Guardian | 5/5 stars |

Your Favourite London Sounds was released as a CD in November 2001 by the LMC's eponymous label. The booklet lists further responses which are not captured on the recording, including "a baby laughing on the Underground", "my boyfriend's orgasms and I love yous" and "none, I war earplugs." Despite the humdrum nature of its contents, the CD was critically praised by reviewers and inspired newspaper articles and radio discussions. Cusack commented that the release had received "far more interest than any of my musical work has ever had". He was pleased with the final recording, commenting: "It was obvious from the responses that people did listen in a lot of detail."

In his review for The Guardian, Walters called Your Favourite London Sounds a "strangely comforting" and "pleasingly mundane" disc with a concept that is theoretically endless. He noted that the LMC consider it to be an "audio postcard" and believed it would sell strongly in tourist shops across London, adding: "It's a Christmas present for homesick émigrés; a souvenir; a generous sample library; a versatile source of filler material for radio schedulers; an audio document of contemporary urban life. It will bring a smile of recognition to many harassed city-dwellers." He named it the newspaper's "CD of the week." In the New York Press, Goldsmith believed the group of sounds to be somewhat uninteresting, with subjective selections that suggest the participants were "not really thinking about how to define the ultimate sound of London." However, he added that as the sounds they choice were those they "encountered in their day-to-day routine", the resulting release is "a more realistic sonic picture of the city than you would get from a promotional or commercial project that tried to describe a city." He also credited the project with allowing him to notice more sounds in his native New York City. The Wire included the album in the "Outer Limits" section of their list of the best records of 2001.

== Legacy ==
The London project was ultimately the beginning of what became Cusack's ongoing Favourite Sounds Project, which later explored diverse cities including Manchester, Birmingham, Southend-on-Sea, Prague, Berlin, Toronto and Beijing. As with the London instalment, all its successors focused on discovering what locals find positive about their cities and neighbourhoods and how they interact with them. In The Bloomsbury Handbook of the Anthropology of Sound (2021), Sam Auinger and Dietmar Offenhuber single out the London edition for reflecting "changes in the sensory qualities of the city as a result of the expansion of the Thames shore into a recreational area."

Frohlich, in his 2004 book Audiophotography: Bringing Photos to Life with Sounds, considers Your Favourite London Sounds to have been part of the emergence of sound-based artistic projects which explore the sentimental value of sound, projects which reveal "a rich set of meanings and preferences for particular kinds of sounds." Clive Bell of Variant magazine considers the recording of Deptford Creek to have been "particularly memorable" for bringing the power station hum with the sound of the Thames. Emily Nunn of The Chicago Tribune considers the London project to be the apogee of Cusack's field recording work, and notes Favourite Sounds of Beijing (2007) as a sequel. She believed such projects were "somewhat old-fashioned" by 2006 standards, but noted the London disc "sold well enough to pay for the project." Your Favourite London Sounds also inspired Jesse Seay's Your Favourite Chicago Sounds (2006), an online public archive of Chicago sounds that Cusack helped organise.

== Track listing ==
1. "Big Ben" – 0:51
2. "London Bridge Station" – 2:07
3. "Brixton Station" – 1:49
4. "'Mind The Gap', Bank Underground Station" – 0:49
5. "The Bank of England, 1.00AM" – 1:36
6. "Blackbird Dawn Chorus, 4.00AM in May" – 2:05
7. "Brick Lane" – 1:51
8. "Bagel Shop, Brick Lane" – 1:22
9. "The Bell on the 73 Bus" – 0:25
10. "Bus Pressure" – 1:00
11. "Butlers Wharf: Thames Sounds" – 2:01
12. "Canal Towpath Stones" – 2:01
13. "Club Queue, Hoxton" – 1:47
14. "Coffee, Soho" – 1:39
15. "Dalston Market" – 1:29
16. "Deptford Market" – 2:09
17. "Deptford Grid Electricity Sub-Station"– 2:20
18. "Regent's Park to Oxford Circus" – 5:00
19. "Escalator, King's Cross Underground Station" – 0:40
20. "Euston Main Line Railway Station" – 1:21
21. "Slamming Doors, Victoria Station" – 1:36
22. "Evening Birds in Abney Park Cemetery, Early May" – 1:59
23. "Michelle's Phone Message" – 0:58
24. "Fountain in Victoria Park, 1.00AM" – 1:25
25. "The Great Court of the British Museum " – 2:09
26. "Helicopter/East London Mosque" – 5:51
27. "Key in Door" – 0:36
28. "Onions Frying in My Flat" – 1:10
29. "Post Through Letterbox" – 1:20
30. "Nightingale/Hum" – 0:56
31. "London Thunder" – 4:09
32. "Rain on Skylight While Lying in Bed" – 1:31
33. "Bleeps at the Supermarket Checkout" – 0:46
34. "Tottenham Hotspurs Football Club, White Hart Lane" – 2:55
35. "St James's Park: Two Species of Baby" – 0:59
36. "Under the Flyover, Hackney Wick" – 1:06
37. "Taxis Waiting at Euston Station" – 0:59
38. "LRT Transformer, Putney" – 1:40
39. "Swifts Over Stoke Newington" – 0:54
40. "16th Floor Up" – 2:35

== Personnel ==
Adapted from the liner notes of Your Favourite London Sounds.

- Peter Cusack – compiling, editing, recording (all tracks except 3, 10, 20, 34 and 38)
- Matthias Kispert – recording ("Brixton Station")
- Tom Wallace – recording ("Bus Pressure")
- Bunny Schendler recording ("Euston Main Lin Railway Station")
- Clive Bell – recording ("Tottenham Hotspurs Football Club, White Hart Lane")
- Syngen Brown – recording ("LRT Transformer, Putney")
- Tom Brake – voice ("Coffee, Soho")
- Evrah – idea ("LRT Transformer, Putney")
- Dave Mandl – photography
- Ed Baxter – booklet design
