= Matthias Osterwold =

German culture manager

Matthias Osterwold (born 1950) is a German culture manager.

== Life ==
Born in Hamburg, Osterwold studied sociology, economics and urban research in Hamburg as well as musicology in Berlin. In 1983, he was one of the founders of the "Freunde Guter Musik Berlin e.V.," an organization for the promotion of Neue Musik and is on its board of directors. Since 1994, he has been an elected member of the interest group "Rat für die Künste Berlin". Between 1999 and 2001, he was music curator at the ZKM Center for Art and Media Karlsruhe. For the sound art festival Sonambiente in Berlin, he was on the artistic direction team both in 1996 and 2006. In Berlin and Lucerne, he was co-initiator of the "Pfeifen im Walde" (1994/97) festival. From 2001 to 2014, he was artistic director of the MaerzMusik, the "Festival für aktuelle Musik" of the Berliner Festspiele. 2002 to 2004, he sat on the jury of the "Hauptstadtkulturfonds". From 2013 to 2018, he was head of the Klangspuren festival in Schwaz. In the years 2018–2020, Osterwold worked as music curator of the "Ruhrtriennale".

He organized various art performances for Terry Fox and after his death became involved in Terry Fox Association.

== Publications ==
- with Terry Fox, Eva Schmidt und Bernd Schulz: Works with sound, Arbeiten mit Klang. Kehrer, Heidelberg 1999. ISBN 3-933257-04-2.
- Ghosts and monsters. Technology and personality in contemporary music. In Leonardo Music Journal. CD Series. Vol. 8, 1998 (CD with accompanying booklet).
- Edited with Volker Straebel and Nicolas Collins: Pfeifen im Walde. Ein unvollständiges Handbuch zur Phänomenologie des Pfeifens. Podewil, Berlin 1994
