= Traymore Hotel =

Demolished hotel in New Jersey, US

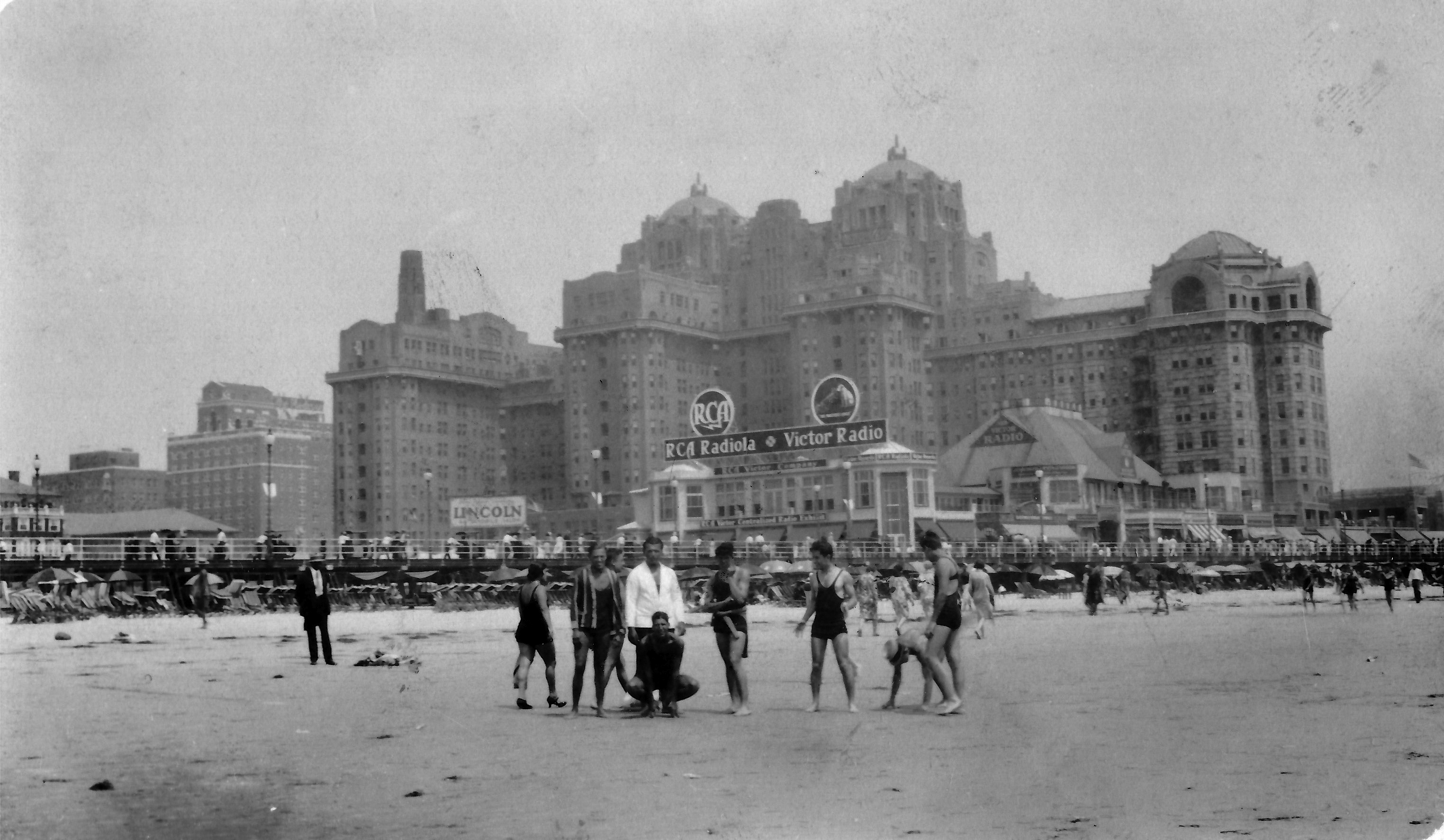
- The Traymore Hotel, c. 1930. The Madison Hotel, which remains standing, is visible to the left.
- Interactive map of the Traymore Hotel area
- Alternative names: The Skyscraper By The Sea

General information
- Location: Illinois Ave. and Boardwalk, Atlantic City, New Jersey, Park Place & The Boardwalk
- Coordinates: 39°21′25″N 74°25′43″W
- Completed: 1906; 1930
- Opening: December 1906
- Renovated: 1956
- Demolished: 1972
- Owner: TJM Properties

Technical details
- Floor count: 24

Design and construction
- Architect: William Lightfoot Price

Other information
- Number of rooms: 400
- Number of suites: 400
- Parking: 500

- Traymore Hotel
- Formerly listed on the U.S. National Register of Historic Places
- Location within New Jersey
- Architect: Price, William L.
- Architectural style: Art Deco
- NRHP reference No.: 71001049

Significant dates
- Added to NRHP: December 13, 1971
- Removed from NRHP: January 1, 1972

The Traymore Hotel was a resort in Atlantic City, New Jersey. Begun as a small boarding house in 1879, the hotel expanded and became one of the city's premier resorts. As Atlantic City began to decline in its popularity as a resort town, during the 1950s and 1960s, the Traymore diminished in popularity. By the early 1970s the hotel was abandoned and severely run down. It was imploded and demolished between April and May 1972, a full four years before the New Jersey Legislature passed the referendum that legalized gambling in Atlantic City.

== Beginnings ==
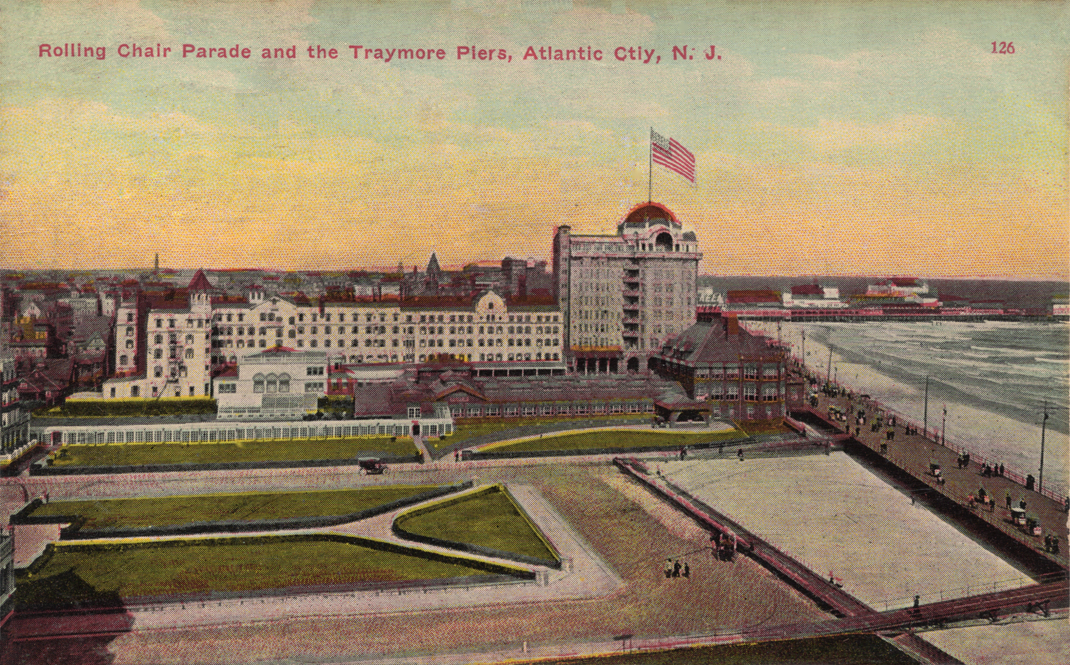
A postcard depicting the Traymore Hotel, c. 1910. Brighton Park is visible in the foreground.

Like most of the pre-casino Atlantic City resorts, the Traymore went through several incarnations. It started off as a modest ten-room wooden cottage boarding house located at Illinois Avenue and the Boardwalk. The name "Traymore" came from the hotel's steadiest customer, "Uncle Al Harvey", a rich Marylander who had named his estate "Traymore" after his home town in Ireland.

The first hotel was rather flimsy, as it was destroyed by a severe winter storm on January 10, 1884. It was quickly rebuilt and enlarged. When rebuilt, the owners made the hotel stronger and more modern, adding indoor plumbing and bathrooms. They also added a spacious lawn between the hotel and the Boardwalk that proved to be valuable when a September 1889 storm struck the city. The lawn protected the hotel from any serious damage. The hotel's modern appointments led to it becoming very popular. It stayed open year-round, and by 1898 it grew into the city's largest hotel with over 450 rooms. By 1906 the Traymore's owner, Daniel White, hired the firm of Price and McLanahan to construct a new tower which brought the hotel right up to the boardwalk.

== Expansion ==
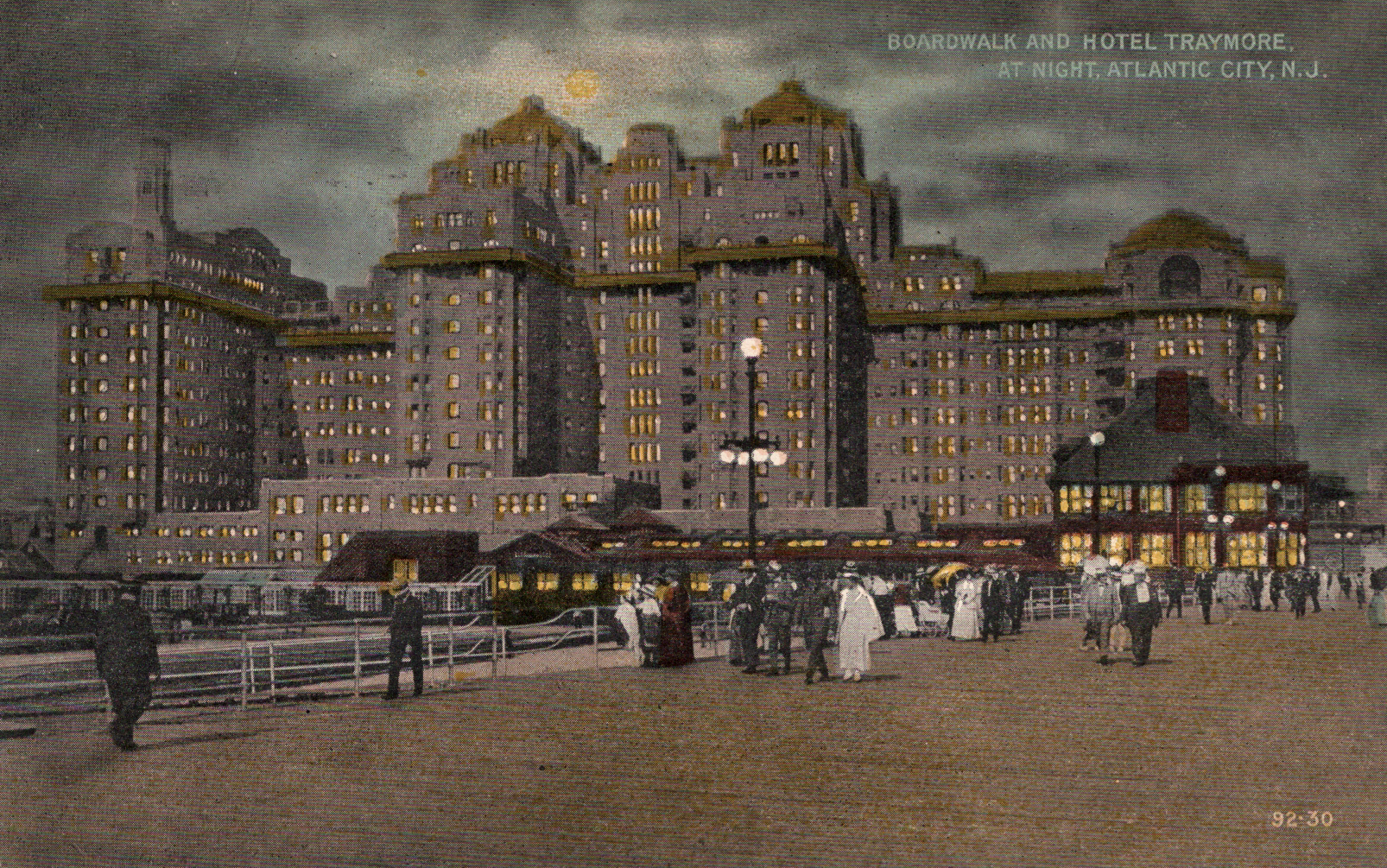
A postcard depicting the Traymore Hotel, c. 1916

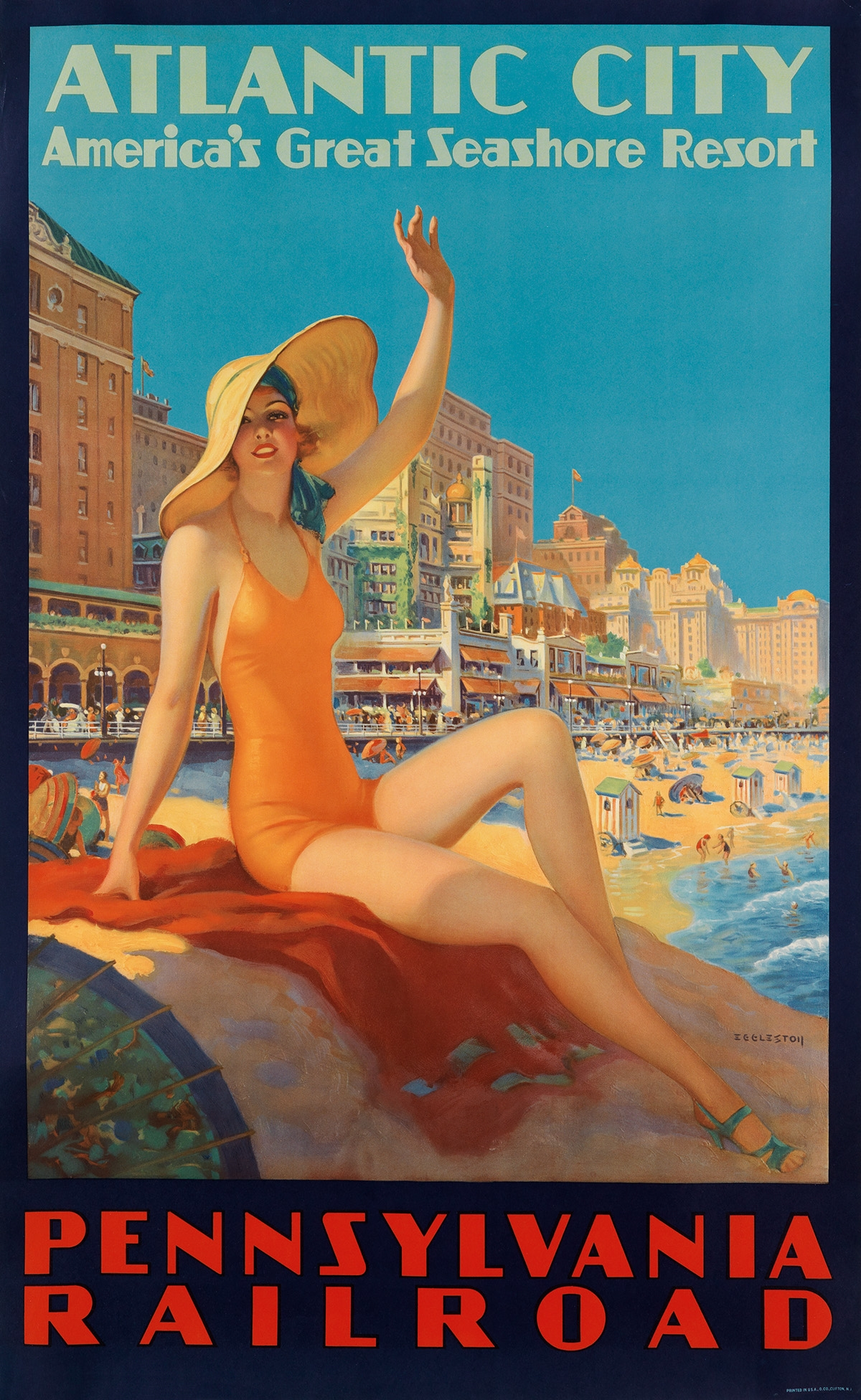
Traymore Hotel in 1936 is on far right. Also visible are Chalfonte and Marlborough-Blenheim hotels.

By 1914, the Traymore, which had been the city's most popular hotel, now had stiff competition from the Marlborough-Blenheim Hotel, located across from the Traymore on Ohio Avenue and the Boardwalk. Owner Josiah White III, Daniel White's half brother, had contracted the services of Price and McLanahan to build an extension to his Marlborough House which had opened in 1902. The result was the modern Blenheim hotel which was one of the first hotels constructed using reinforced concrete.

Built during the autumn and winter of 1914–15, White contracted with Price and McLanahan to replace the existing wooden-frame Traymore with a massive concrete structure that would rival the Marlborough-Blenheim. Price's Traymore was built directly behind the 1906 tower, and was designed to take advantage of its ocean views: hotel wings jutted out further from the central tower toward Pacific Avenue, thus affording more guests ocean views. The new Traymore opened in time for the 1915 season, and was a success. Built with tan brick and capped by yellow-tiled domes, the Traymore instantly became the city's architectural showpiece when it opened in June 1915. The hotel was such a success that White commissioned a 25-story additional tower to be built, but was unable to secure funding for the project due to World War I.

The Traymore catered to an upscale clientele, and was described in 1924 as "the Taj Mahal of Atlantic City," decades before Donald Trump opened a casino resort with that name.

The Traymore featured four faucets in every bathtub: hot and cold city water, hot and cold ocean water. There was a fifth faucet in the sink for ice water.

The Traymore was leased by the US Military during World War II, as part of Army Air Force Basic Training Center No. 7. The forty-seven Atlantic City resort hotels taken over by the United States Military were collectively dubbed "Camp Boardwalk". The Traymore was operated jointly with the adjacent Chalfonte-Haddon Hall Hotel as the England General Hospital, which opened on April 28, 1944. The hospital was named for Lt. Col. Thomas Marcus England, who had worked with Walter Reed researching yellow fever in Cuba in 1900. The Traymore served as the convalescent reconditioning section of the hospital. The last patients left the hospital in June 1946 and the Traymore was returned to its owners and reopened soon after.

The Traymore Hotel Outdoor and Indoor Swimming Pools were built 1954 to designs by architect Samuel Juster of New York City.

== Demise and present status ==
The hotel remained popular well into the 1950s, but as Atlantic City declined in the 1960s, the Traymore did as well. The availability of home air conditioning and swimming pools, coupled with inexpensive and frequent airline services to destinations in Florida and the Caribbean, led to the decline of Atlantic City as the premier ocean resort. By the early 1970s, the hotel was defunct and was causing its owners large financial deficits. It was decided to demolish the hotel, despite a campaign to save the architectural landmark.

On April 27, 1972 the hotel experienced the first of four planned controlled implosions implemented by Jack Loizeaux. By May 1972 the hotel was completely demolished. For a time, the once-famous hotel held the Guinness World Record for largest controlled demolition—with a capacity of nearly 6.5 million cubic feet (180,000 m^{3}), the Traymore was the largest (though not highest) structure yet demolished. The spectacle is captured in the 1980 film Atlantic City.

Caesars Atlantic City purchased the land in the late 1970s and utilized it as a parking lot. The casino intended to develop a hotel there, however, the plan did not materialize. In 2006, Pinnacle Entertainment announced that it purchased the Traymore site and the adjacent Sands Atlantic City casino hotel. Pinnacle demolished the Sands and planned to develop a new casino on the combined parcels. Harsh economic times later caused Pinnacle to delay construction of the new resort. In February 2010, the company announced that it had canceled its construction plans and would instead seek to sell the land. Most of the Traymore site remains a parking lot.

== Popular culture ==
Traymore Hotel is one of the locations featured in Grace Livingston Hill's 1911 novel Aunt Crete's Emancipation.

It can be seen in several exterior scenes of the 1972 Bob Rafelson film The King of Marvin Gardens, which was shot in Atlantic City only a few months before the building was demolished.

Footage of the Traymore's demolition features in the opening of Louis Malle's 1980 film Atlantic City. Nevertheless, the Traymore was demolished in 1972 for financial reasons and not in anticipation of legalized gambling (a 1974 referendum to allow casinos throughout the state was not approved by New Jersey voters). Gambling was legalized four years after the demolition in 1976 with Resorts International being the first legal casino to open in 1978.

The HBO drama Boardwalk Empire used the Atlantic City skyline, circa 1920, as the back drop for the series opening titles, including both the Traymore and the famed Marlborough-Blenheim Hotel.

== See also ==
- List of tallest buildings in Atlantic City

Preceded by Marlborough-Blenheim Hotel	Tallest Building in Atlantic City; 1915—1921; 220 ft	Succeeded by Ritz-Carlton
