= Klangspuren =

Austrian music festival

- Genre: Contemporary music
- Frequency: annual
- Locations: Schwaz, Tyrol, Austria
- Inaugurated: 1994; 32 years ago
- People: Thomas Larcher; Peter Paul Kainrath; Matthias Osterwold; Reinhard Kager
- Website: www.klangspuren.at

Klangspuren, also Klangspuren Schwaz, subtitled Tiroler Festival für Neue Musik, is an annual festival for contemporary music in Schwaz in Tyrol, founded in 1994. The title literally translates to "traces of sound". It commissioned around 200 orchestral and ensemble compositions as of 2020. The artistic director is Reinhard Kager.

== History ==
The Klangspuren festival was founded, dedicated to contemporary music and avant-garde music, in Schwaz, in 1994 by Thomas Larcher and Maria-Luise Mayr. The festival commissioned around 200 orchestral and ensemble works as of 2020, including compositions by Georg Friedrich Haas, Helmut Lachenmann, György Kurtág, Johannes Maria Staud, Olga Neuwirth, Beat Furrer and Pierre-Laurent Aimard. Performing ensembles have included the Ensemble Modern, the Klangforum Wien, and the Ensemble intercontemporain. One focus of the festival is the attempt to reach new audiences, for example apprentices and children. Projects are advertised with unusual methods, and some performances scheduled in venues such as supermarkets, tennis halls and factories.

In 2003, the South Tyrolean pianist Peter Paul Kainrath became artistic director. He was succeeded in 2013 by the German music curator Matthias Osterwold. From 2019, the Austrian music curator and journalist Reinhard Kager has been artistic director.

Due to the 2020 COVID19 pandemic, the program of the 2020 festival was changed to a focus on Austrian performers who have no travel restriction, and to small ensembles. The opening concert on 11 September combines works from the 21st century by Hannes Kerschbaumer, Adriana Hölszky and Gerd Kühr with English music from the 20th century by Peter Maxwell Davies and Harrison Birtwistle, played by the Tiroler Symphonieorchester.
