= Nicolas Collins =

American classical composer

Nicolas Collins (born March 26, 1954, in New York City) is a composer of mostly electronic music, a sound artist and writer. He received his BA and MA from Wesleyan University, and his PhD from the University of East Anglia. Upon graduating from Wesleyan, he was a Watson Fellow.

== Biography ==
In the 1980s Collins was "a pioneer in the use of microcomputers in live performance, and has made extensive use of 'home-made' electronic circuitry, radio, found sound material, and transformed musical instruments." Trained in the experimental compositional tradition of Alvin Lucier, David Behrman, and David Tudor, all of whom he worked with closely, Collins also immersed himself in the New York Improvised Music scene of the 1980s. Using home-built instruments that combined circuitry, simple computers and traditional instruments such as trombones and slide guitars, he collaborated and performed with Tom Cora, Shelley Hirsch, Christian Marclay, Zeena Parkins, John Zorn and others. Collins's compositions frequently ask performers to respond to unpredictable musical cues, as in Devil's Music (1985), in which the performer DJs with snippets of live scanning radio, or Still Lives (1993), in which a solo trumpet player improvises against a skipping CD of Renaissance brass music. More recent works include In Memoriam Michel Waiswicz (2008), in which a birthday candle 'plays' a light-sensitive circuit until it burns down; and Speak, Memory (2016) in which the digital data of photographic images is played as sound in a room, where it is allowed to decay, and the decay is reflected in the photograph, which changes and eventually disappears as sound fades to silence.

As a studio artist at PS1 in 1983–84, Collins exhibited sound sculptures of 'backwards guitars'—found instruments modified so the pick-ups resonated the guitar strings with live radio signals. Subsequent installation projects at Musée Malraux (Le Havre), Gemeentemuseum of the Hague (now named the Kunstmuseum), ZKM (Karlsruhe); and the Sonambiente sound art festival (Berlin), featured performing devices such a model train that 'plays'a long amplified wire, as well as multi-channel video works.

Collins' musical compositions have been presented at venues around the world, ranging from CBGB to the Concertgebouw. As a composer-performer he has presented concerts and workshops on every continent save Antarctica.

He has also been active as a curator, policy adviser, and board member for numerous cultural organizations, since first taking on the post of Curator of Music Performances and Sound Installations at PS1/The Clocktower (now MoMA PS1) in 1985. In 1992 he left New York to become artistic director of STEIM (Studio for Electro Instrumental Music) in Amsterdam, and later moved to Berlin on a German Academic Exchange Service (DAAD) composer-in-residence fellowship. From 1997 to 2017 Collins served as Editor-in-Chief of the Leonardo Music Journal, a peer-reviewed academic journal published by the MIT Press., and he sits on the editorial boards of Resonance: the Journal of Sound and Culture (University of California Press), Acoustic Arts & Artifacts: Technology, Aesthetics, Communication (Fondazione Giorgio Cini, Venice), the Journal of Sound Studies (The Netherlands), and Resonancias – Revista de Investigación Musical (Chile).

Collins is Professor of Sound at the School of the Art Institute of Chicago, and has been guest professor at Institute of Sonology, Royal Conservatory of The Hague; Kunsthochschule Kassel, Germany; Universität der Künste Berlin; Pontificia Universidad Católica de Chile, Santiago; and Technische Universität Berlin, among other locations.

In 2006 Collins' book Handmade Electronic Music: The Art of Hardware Hacking was published by Routledge, and a second edition was published in 2009. A broadly expanded third edition, released in the summer of 2020, documents the grass-roots spread of 'Hardware Hacking' through local art and music organizations and collectives, often in conjunction with feminist and/or regional cultural concerns, from Brazil to Indonesia. He was a major influence on the establishment of the Musical Electronics Library in New Zealand.

Collins lives and works in Berlin, Chicago and rural Massachusetts.

== Discography ==
- 1982 - Going Out With Slow Smoke, compiled with Ron Kuivila's works (Lovely Music)
- 1984 - Let The State Make The Selection (Lovely Music)
- 1986 - Devil's Music (Lovely Music)
- 1988 - Real Landscape (Banned Productions)
- 1988 (with Robert Poss) - Inverse Guitar (Trace Elements)
- 1989 - 100 of the World's Most Beautiful Melodies (Trace Elements)
- 1992 - It Was a Dark and Stormy Night (Trace Elements)
- 1999 - A Host, Of Golden Daffodils, collaboration with Peter Cusack (Plate Lunch)
- 1999 - Sound Without Picture (Periplum)
- 2004 - Pea Soup (Appelstaartje)
- 2009 - Devil's Music (EM Records)
- 2015 - Salvaged (Trace Elements Records)

== Bibliography ==
- Nicolas Collins,Handmade Electronic Music: The Art of Hardware Hacking, (Routledge), Third edition, 2020; Second edition, 2009; First edition, 2006. Japanese edition, 2013. Korean edition, 2016.
- Nicolas Collins, Micro Analyses, Paris: van Dieren Éditeur, 2015
- Nicolas Collins, "Grazing the buffet : the musical menu after Cage," in Schröder, J. and Straebel, V. ed.Proceedings of the symposium John Cage und die Folgen / Cage & Consequences, Berlin, 2012
- Nicolas Collins, "Live Electronic Music," in Collins, N. ed., The Cambridge Companion to Electronic Music, Cambridge University Press, 2007.
- Nicolas Collins, "Beim nächsten Ton ist es..." ("At The Tone The Time Will Be..."), in Dialog III: Musik im Klangkunst und Musiktheater, 1999.
- Nicolas Collins, Matthias Osterwold, Volker Straebel, Pfeiffen im Walde, Berlin: Podewil, 1994

== See also ==
- Bart Hopkin, another author with a focus on somewhat identical topics
