= Jack Cooke =

Jack Cooke may refer to:

- Jack Kent Cooke (1912–1997), Canadian-American businessman and sports team owner, including the Los Angeles Lakers, among others
- Vernon Crawford "Jack" Cooke (1936–2009), American bluegrass musician
- Jack Cooke, British jazz critic and writer for Jazz Review and other sources
- Jack Cooke, British musician with Radiator (band)
- Jack Kent Cooke Foundation

== See also ==
- Jack Cook (disambiguation)
