= London Musicians Collective =

British music organisation

The London Musicians Collective (LMC) is a cultural charity based in London, England, devoted to the support and promotion of contemporary, experimental and improvised music.

From its foundation in 1975 until its reorganization in 2009, the LMC organized concerts, festivals, tours, workshops and publications in support of experimental music.

The LMC grew from the magazine Musics and had overlapping membership. It had some of the same approach to division of labour as the magazine. While the latter chose financial independence, the LMC at its first meeting rejected this policy by 37 votes to 1. The LMC then applied to the Arts Council of Great Britain for funding.

Two LPs were produced, numbered LMC1 and LMC2, but they were independent productions not directly initiated by the main collective.

In 2002, the LMC was awarded a community radio licence to broadcast a new radio station, Resonance FM, in central London. It also produced a magazine, Resonance, and a range of CDs, including Your Favourite London Sounds in 2001, compiled by Peter Cusack.

The LMC is funded by donations, membership fees and grants. It was supported by Arts Council England until its funding was cut in 2008.

After the LMC ceased its initial programme of activities in 2008 the contents of its office were archived by CRiSAP (Creative Research in Sound Arts Practice) at the London College of Communication, University of the Arts London in 2009.

An online exhibition Sound Traces, curated by LMC co-founder David Toop for CriSAP, explored the legacy of LMC activities from 1975–2008. This ran from 2009 until April 2023 and an archive record of the exhibition is in preparation for late 2023.
