= Sands Atlantic City =

Former hotel and casino in Atlantic City, New Jersey

Coordinates: 39.358°N 74.431°W

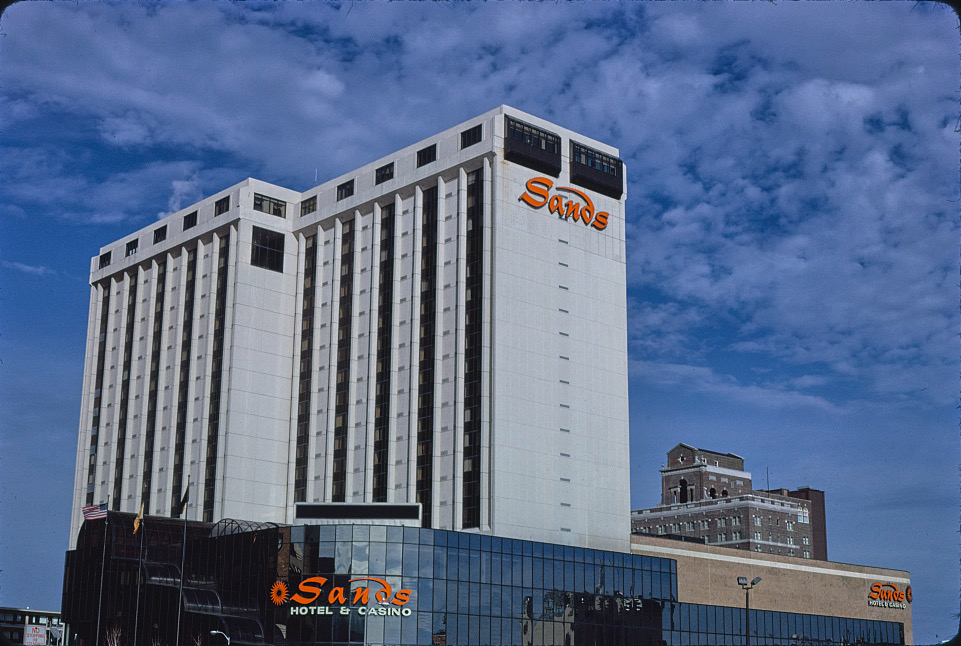
- Sands Hotel in 1985
- Interactive map of Sands Atlantic City
- Location: Atlantic City, New Jersey; 119 South Indiana Avenue, Atlantic City, New Jersey
- Opened: August 13, 1980; 46 years ago
- Closed: November 11, 2006; 19 years ago
- Demolished: October 18, 2007
- Theme: Desert
- No. of rooms: 532
- Signature attractions: Copa Room
- Notable restaurants: Medici
- Casino type: Land-based
- Previous names: Brighton Hotel & Casino (1980-81)

Sands Atlantic City was a casino and hotel that operated from August 13, 1980 until November 11, 2006 in Atlantic City, New Jersey. It was formerly known as the Brighton Hotel & Casino. It consisted of a 21-story hotel tower with 532 rooms and a 5-story podium housing the 57,045 sq ft (5,299.7 m^{2}) casino, restaurants, shops, and various other amenities. It was adjacent to The Claridge Hotel and its parking garage was adjacent to the Madison Hotel.

== History ==
=== Construction and opening ===
The first Brighton Hotel (originally named the Brighton Cottage) was opened in 1876 on the site that would eventually become the Sands. It was demolished in 1959.

The Brighton Hotel & Casino was built at a cost of $70 million by Greate Bay Casino Corporation, controlled by two local businessmen, Eugene Gatti and Arthur Kania. It opened on August 13, 1980. The Brighton was the fourth property to open following the 1977 legalization of casinos in Atlantic City, and the first to be built from the ground up, rather than as a renovation of an existing hotel. The developers hoped that the Brighton's quiet atmosphere and small size, about half that of the city's other casino hotels, would prove attractive to high rollers. Early marketing featured Bert Parks as a spokesman, and the slogan "Brighton Up".

After less than a month in operation, Holiday Inns agreed to buy the Brighton for $121 million in cash and stock plus assumption of the property's $37 million mortgage. Holiday Inns pulled out of the deal a month later. As the Brighton headed into its first winter, the city's low season, it faced severe cash flow problems, with lower monthly revenue than all its competitors.

=== Pratt era (1981–1998) ===
The Brighton was rescued in the first months of 1981 by $10 million in financing from Inns of the Americas (a Dallas-based hotel operator, owned by the Pratt brothers) and financiers Burton and Richard Koffman. Inns of the Americas and the Koffmans went on to buy a 60 percent interest in the Brighton from Gatti and Kania for $30 million in May 1981. Inns of the Americas had recently bought the Sands Hotel on the Las Vegas Strip, and immediately renamed the Atlantic City property under the well-known Sands name. The property soon became profitable under its new ownership.

The Pratts soon sold the Sands in Las Vegas back to its previous owner, but the Atlantic City property retained the Sands name under a licensing agreement, despite no longer having any affiliation with its namesake.

In 1982, arcade game manufacturer Williams Electronics began an effort to take over the Sands, buying Gatti and Kania's shares, and agreeing to buy the Koffmans' shares. A white knight soon appeared, in the form of Drew National Corp., a New York-based conglomerate, which agreed to buy the Koffmans' interest. The deal foundered when Drew's major shareholders, Robert Bass and his brothers, refused to make financial disclosures required by the gaming licensing process. A restructuring was eventually completed in 1985, with the Sands wholly owned by Pratt Hotel Corporation, which in turn was 52%-owned by Pratt's former shareholders, 35% by the Southmark Corporation of Texas, and 10% by Drew's shareholders.

At its peak, the Sands headlined top entertainers, such as Frank Sinatra, Tony Bennett, Cher, Liza Minnelli, Bob Dylan, Robin Williams, Whitney Houston, and Eddie Murphy, among others. However, Sands was soon eclipsed by newer Atlantic City casinos and, at the time of its closing, had become the smallest of the city's 12 casinos.

The Sands joined with the neighboring Claridge Hotel and Casino to build an elevated moving sidewalk, opened in 1988, to bring visitors from the boardwalk to the two properties.

Pratt Hotel announced plans in 1987 to build a sister property called the Sands Boardwalk at the site of the unfinished Penthouse Boardwalk Hotel and Casino, while the existing property would be renamed as the Sands Park. Later reports had the new property's name as the Hollywood Hotel and Casino, or the Sands Hollywood. The plan was scrapped when Penthouse instead sold the site to Donald Trump in March 1989.

The Sands took over the long vacant Jefferson Hotel, adjacent to its parking garage, in 1989, to be converted into administrative offices.

In the early 1990s, as legalized gambling spread to new states, the Pratts established Hollywood Casino Corp. (HWCC) to develop new casinos under the Hollywood Casino name. At the time of its initial public offering in 1993, HWCC owned an 80 percent stake in Pratt Hotel.

A second-floor gaming area was opened in 1994, with a ribbon-cutting by Governor Christie Whitman. The extra 26,000 square feet (2,400 m^{2}), including a new racebook, gave the Sands the fourth largest casino in Atlantic City.

The Sands announced a new plan in 1994 to rebrand itself as a Hollywood Casino within two years. A video store was opened at the property, along with the film-themed "Epic Buffet", decorated with props from classic movies. The rebranding was never completed.

As the Sands's high debt load and poor cash flow dragged down its parent company, HWCC decided in 1996 to divest itself of the property. At year's end, all of HWCC's stock in Pratt Hotel was distributed to HWCC shareholders, and Pratt Hotel was renamed as Greate Bay Casino Corporation.

=== Bankruptcy and Icahn era (1998–2006) ===
In 1998, the Sands filed for bankruptcy protection. While in bankruptcy, it was not required to make its $25 million in annual payments to bondholders, freeing up cash for a minor expansion. The Sands spent $10 million to buy the adjacent Midtown-Bala Hotel, which had separated it from Pacific Avenue, the main thoroughfare running parallel to the boardwalk. The Midtown-Bala was demolished to make way for a new entryway and porte-cochere, which were unveiled in June 2000.

Park Place Entertainment and financier Carl Icahn put forth competing plans to take over and reorganize the company. Icahn's plan was selected by the bankruptcy court, and the business was reorganized in September 2000 as the publicly traded GB Holdings Inc., with Icahn owning a 65 percent share. The Claridge also filed for bankruptcy in August 1999, and Icahn fought to gain control of it as well, hoping to combine its operations with those of the Sands, but Park Place instead won ownership of the Claridge and merged it into Bally's. Icahn later transferred most of the interest in the Sands to another of his companies, American Real Estate Partners, sending GB Holdings into bankruptcy in September 2005.

The Sands took over the adjacent historic Madison Hotel in 2000 under a lease agreement. By adding the Madison's units to its room count, the Sands was allowed to expand its casino floor by 10,000 square feet (930 m^{2}). The Sands spent $25 million on a renovation of the Madison, completed in 2005, turning the hotel's 230 rooms into 126 suites.

In May 2006, American Real Estate Partners purchased the vacant former site of the Traymore Hotel from Harrah's Entertainment for $61 million. The Traymore site separated the Sands from the boardwalk, which had always hampered the Sands's ability to expand, and reduced its attractiveness to potential buyers. Icahn indicated that he might use the Traymore site for an expansion of the Sands, or might bundle it together with the Sands for sale.

In September 2006, Pinnacle Entertainment agreed to buy the Sands and the Traymore site for a total of $250 million, with plans to close and demolish the Sands, and build a larger casino. The Sands closed on November 11, 2006, and the sale to Pinnacle was completed days later.

The building was imploded at 9:37 p.m. Eastern Daylight Time on October 18, 2007; the first-ever casino-hotel implosion on the East Coast. It was accompanied by a fireworks show and numerous parties along the boardwalk. The parking garage for the property was imploded separately on April 3, 2008 with little to no fanfare.

Sands Atlantic City was the last casino in North America to bear the famous Sands moniker until the new Sands Casino Resort Bethlehem opened on May 22, 2009.

Pinnacle canceled its planned casino in 2010, and sold the land in 2013 for $29.5 million to a group of local developers who planned to build a casino or family entertainment attraction.

In 2025, the owners of the land once belonging to the Sands were approached by D-Wayne Prieto of the New York City-based Vivo Investment Partners. The land would serve as part of a larger proposed expansion project of the neighboring Claridge hotel which the group also plans to acquire. The project is planned to include a massive sports and entertainment complex that would sit on both the former site of the Sands as well as the neighboring Brighton Park, altogether planned to become Atlantic City’s largest non-gaming attraction. Other facilities in the proposal include 1500 apartment units and a new 800 room hotel.

== Facilities ==
As of 1999, the Sands's buildings had 628,000 square feet (58,300 m^{2}) of floor space on 4.5 acres (1.8 ha) of land, with facilities including:

- a 57,296-square-foot (5,323.0 m^{2}) casino with 2,025 slot machines and 99 table games
- a 15,963-square-foot (1,483.0 m^{2}) racebook
- a 21-story tower with 532 hotel rooms, including deluxe "Plaza Club" rooms on the 17th through 19th floors
- an 850-seat showroom
- a two-story food court with eleven vendors
- a spa and salon in the top two floors of the tower
- an eleven-story parking garage with 1,738 spaces
- administrative offices housed in the nine-story Jefferson Hotel building
- a five-bay bus terminal
- the People Mover, an elevated moving sidewalk, connecting the Sands and the Claridge to the boardwalk

== Events ==
Boxing matches were held at the casino.
