= Reinhard Kager =

Austrian philosopher, journalist and music promoter

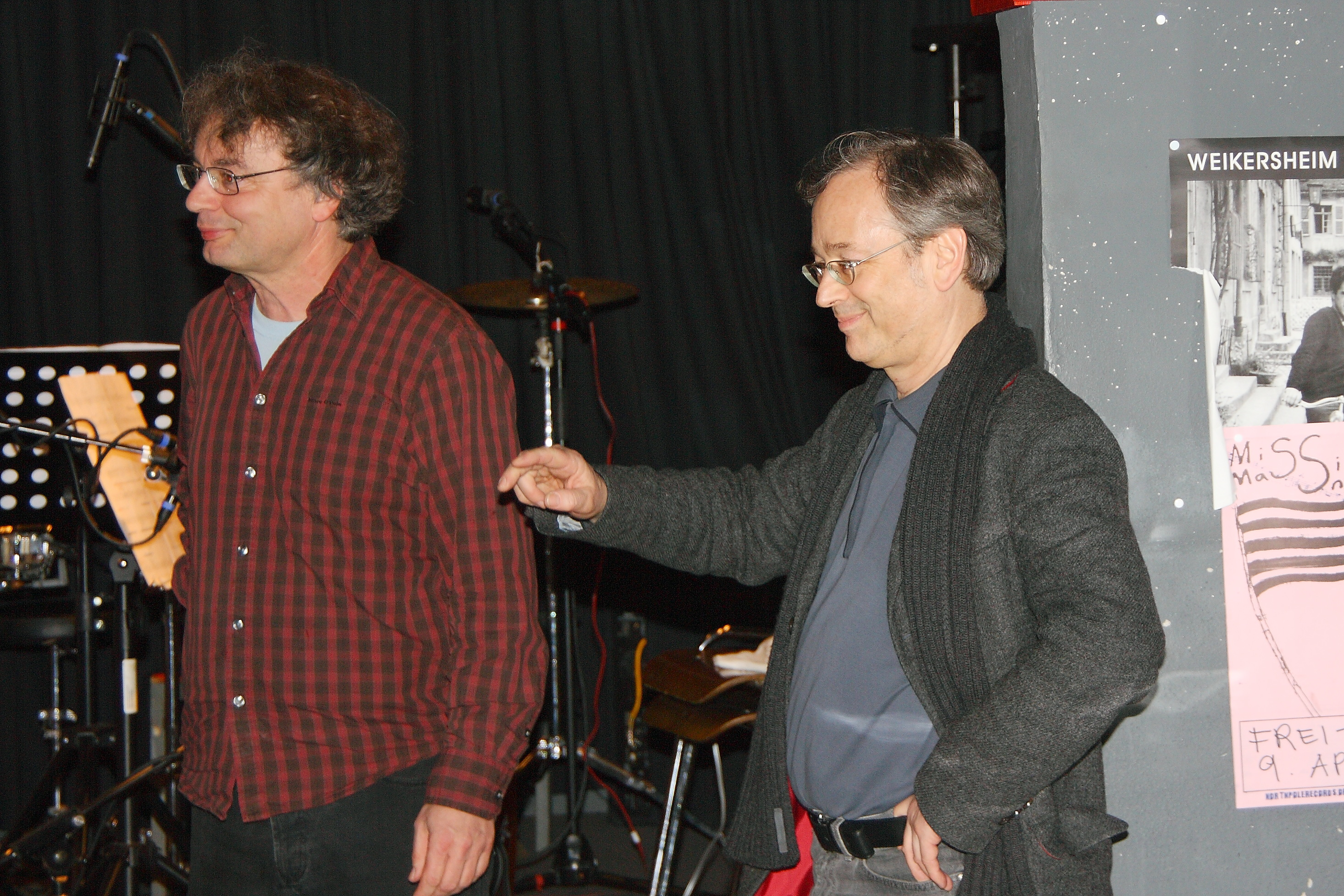
Reinhard Kager (right) and Norbert Bach moderating Now Jazz by SWR in 2010

Reinhard Kager (born 2 April 1954) is an Austrian philosopher, journalist and music promoter who also worked as a music producer.

== Career ==
Born in Graz, Kager studied philosophy, sociology and music at the University of Graz and at the Kunstuniversität Graz, from 1973. From 1986, he worked as a lecturer at the Philosophical Institute of the University of Graz and taught aesthetic theory, sociology of art and media theory. With his book Herrschaft und Versöhnung (1988) he wrote an introduction to the thinking of Theodor W. Adorno. From 1995 to 1998, he researched, supported by an APART scholarship from the Austrian Academy of Sciences, on the subject "Musik zwischen Tradition und Fortschritt" (Music between tradition and progress).

Between 1994 and 2002, he also worked in Vienna as a freelance journalist specialising in music and theatre for numerous radio stations of the ARD and as a correspondent for the feature pages of the Frankfurter Allgemeine Zeitung. From 2002 to 2012, he was head of the jazz editorial office of the Südwestrundfunk. There, he was responsible for the improvisation programme at the Donaueschinger Musiktage and for the SWR New Jazz Meeting. His special focus was on innovative tendencies of Free improvisation and on experiments of the new electronic scene. He has produced more than 30 albums.

Since July 2012 Kager has been living in Vienna again as a freelance writer. There, he works as a correspondent for the Frankfurter Allgemeine Zeitung, the magazine Opernwelt and the Neue Musikzeitung, for the ORF and numerous ARD radio stations.

In October 2018, Kager took over the artistic direction of the Tyrolean festival Klangspuren and programmed the first cycle of events in September 2019.
