= Marlborough-Blenheim Hotel =

Demolished hotel in New Jersey, US

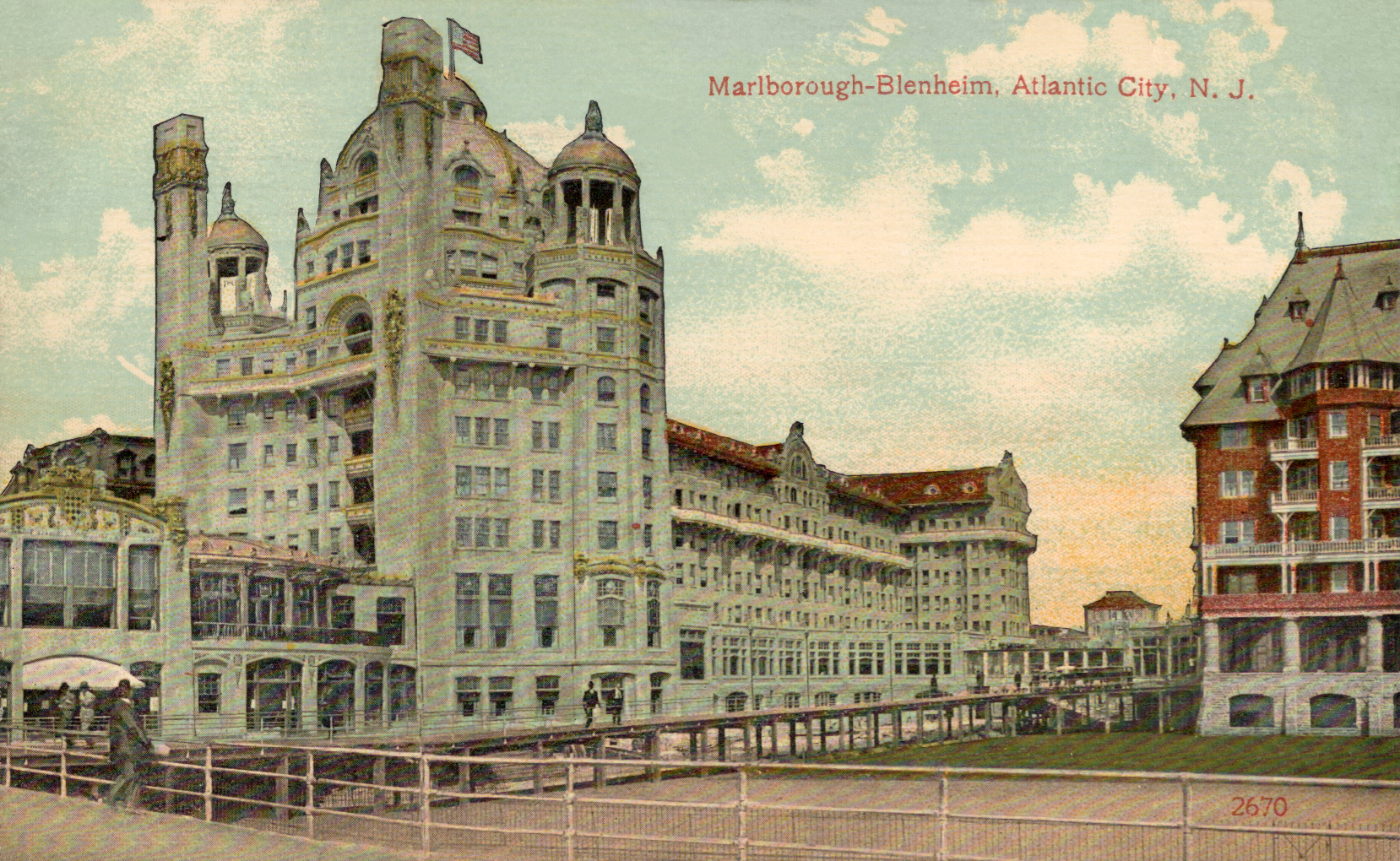
- The Marlborough-Blenheim Hotel in 1906
- Interactive map of the Marlborough-Blenheim Hotel area

General information
- Status: Demolished
- Location: Atlantic City, New Jersey, U.S., 1900 Pacific Avenue
- Coordinates: 39°21′25″N 74°25′39.88″W
- Construction started: 1902
- Topped-out: 1906
- Opening: 1906
- Closed: October 25, 1977; 48 years ago
- Demolished: 1978-79
- Owner: Josiah White III

Design and construction
- Architect: William Lightfoot Price

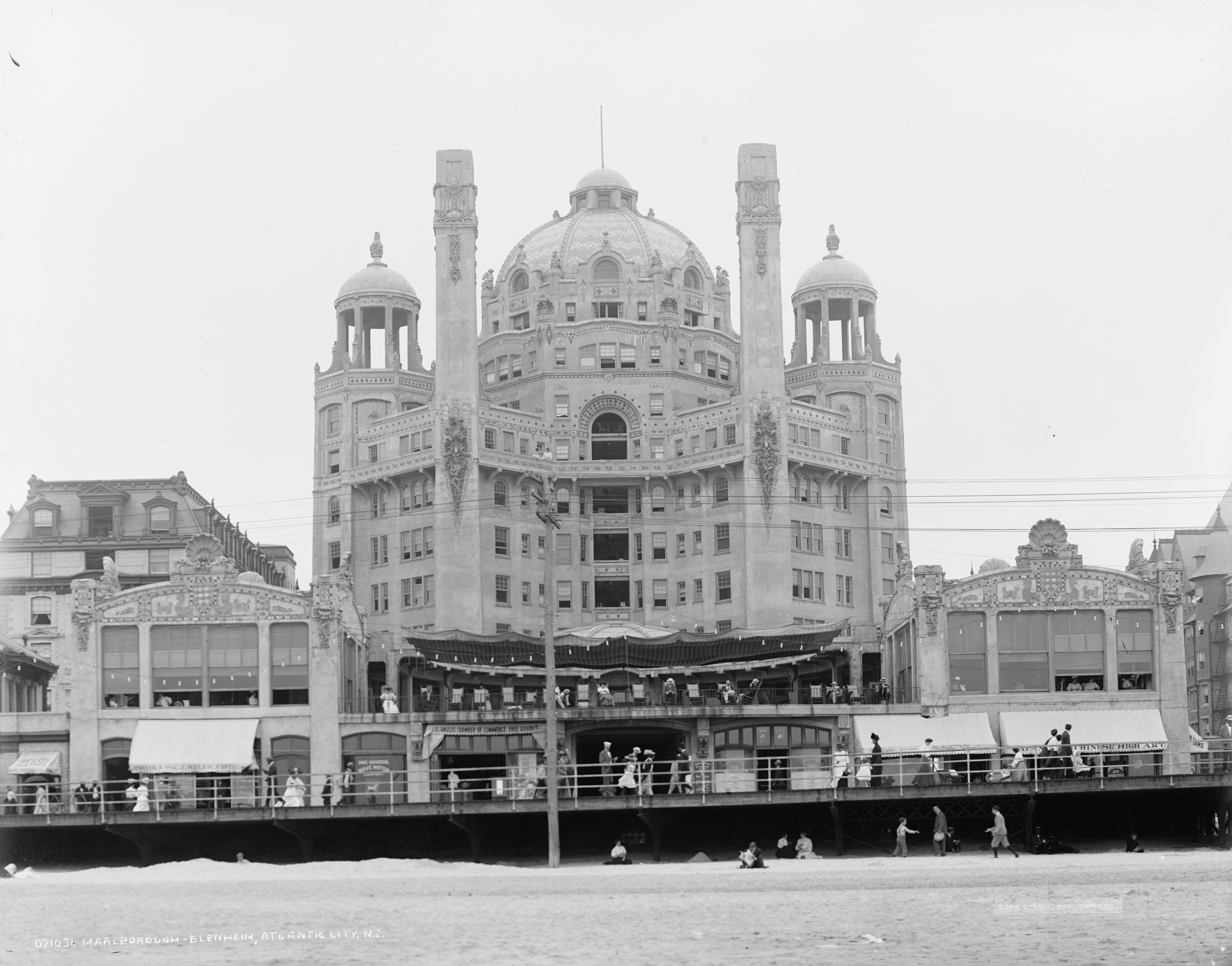
The Marlborough-Blenheim Hotel, 1906

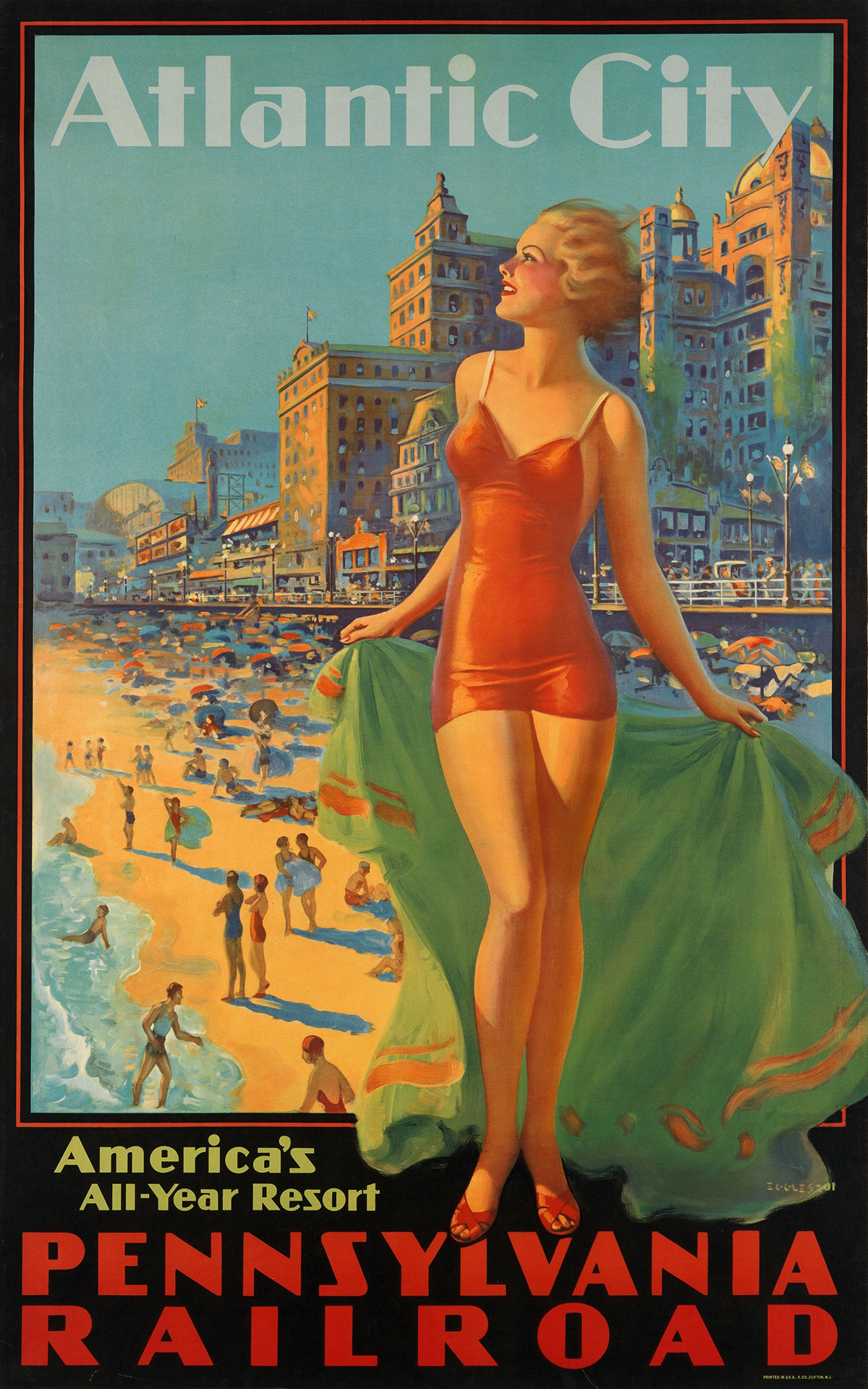
The hotel in 1936 is on upper right. Edward Mason Eggleston, illustrator.

The Marlborough-Blenheim Hotel was a historic resort hotel property in Atlantic City, New Jersey, built in 1902–1906, and demolished in October 1978.

== History ==
In 1900, Josiah White III bought a parcel of land between Ohio Avenue and Park Place on the Boardwalk, and built the Queen Anne style Marlborough House. The hotel was financially successful and in 1905, he chose to expand. White hired Philadelphia architect William Lightfoot Price of Price and McLanahan to design a new, separate tower to be called the Blenheim. "Blenheim" refers to Blenheim Palace in England, the ancestral home of Sir Winston Churchill, a grandson of the 7th Duke of Marlborough.

Recent hotel fires in and around Atlantic City, Price's recent experience designing the all-concrete Jacob Reed store in Philadelphia, and a steel strike in the fall of 1905 influenced Price's choice of reinforced concrete for the tower. It opened in 1906.

It was not the first reinforced concrete hotel in the world, as French concrete pioneer François Hennebique had designed the Imperial Palace Hotel in Nice five years previously. But it was the largest reinforced concrete building in the world. The hotel's Spanish and Moorish themes, capped off with its signature dome and chimneys, represented a step forward from other hotels that had a classically designed influence.

In 1916, Winston Churchill was a guest of the hotel.

In 1946, President General May Erwin Talmadge held the 55th Continental Congress of the Daughters of the American Revolution at the hotel.

On March 14, 1977, Reese Palley and local attorney and businessman Martin Blatt purchased the Marlborough-Blenheim from the White family. They intended to spend $35 million on renovations, preserving the Blenheim wing, while razing the Marlborough to make way for a modern casino hotel. In June 1977, Bally Manufacturing, the world's largest producer of slot machines, leased the Marlborough-Blenheim from Palley and Blatt for 40 years, with an option for a further 100 years. On August 17, 1977, Bally announced that it had purchased the neighboring Dennis Hotel for $4 million from the First National Bank of South Jersey. On October 25, 1977, Josiah White IV, grandson of the Marlborough-Blenheim's founder, presided over the closure of the hotel, locking its front door.

After Bally took control of the two properties, it announced plans to raze all three hotel buildings - the Marlborough, the Blenheim, and the Dennis, despite protests, to make way for the new "Bally's Park Place Casino and Hotel", an $83 million casino/hotel designed by California-based Maxwell Starkman Associates. The new resort was to have a 39-story, octagonal hotel tower and a huge three-level podium, containing a 75,000-square-foot (7,000 m^{2}) casino, along with other resort and convention facilities. However, in an effort to offset costs and open the casino as soon as possible, the Dennis Hotel was retained to serve as the temporary hotel for Bally's until a new tower could be built.

Bally demolished the wood-framed Marlborough with the conventional wrecking ball. For the Blenheim the company hired Controlled Demolition, Inc. (CDI) and Winzinger Incorporated of Hainesport New Jersey, which had taken down the Traymore Hotel, to implode the structure. A preservation group which had sought historic status for the building won a stay of execution for the Blenheim's rotunda portion on the Boardwalk. It was separated from the rest of the hotel, which was imploded in the fall of 1978. Several months later its historic status was denied, the stay was lifted, and CDI finished the demolition January 4, 1979. It is not known if they sold the name Marlborough-Blenheim as well.

Bally's Park Place now stands at this location.

== In culture ==
The hotel, here renamed the "Essex-Carlton", features prominently in the 1972 Bob Rafelson film The King of Marvin Gardens, starring Jack Nicholson, Bruce Dern and Ellen Burstyn.

In the Garry Marshall film Beaches, a young Hillary Whitney stays with her family at the hotel, where she treats a young C. C. Bloom to chocolate sodas in the Garden Court. The scene was filmed at the Ambassador Hotel (Los Angeles), which itself was torn down in 2005.

In the HBO television show Boardwalk Empire, the fictionalized Nucky Thompson lives on the 8th floor of a Ritz-Carlton whose architecture is based on the Marlborough-Blenheim's, rather than that of the actual Ritz-Carlton in Atlantic City that the real Nucky Johnson had lived in. The Blenheim hotel is mentioned throughout the series.

A clip of the demolition of the main dome of the hotel is featured in the video for Bruce Springsteen's song "Atlantic City."

The second act of the 1925 Broadway musical comedy "No, No, Nanette" is set in the Marlborough-Blenheim and the song "Peach of the Beach" contains the lyric: "You can bet Nanette is the prize and pet of the Marlborough-Blenheim Hotel."

== See also ==
- List of tallest buildings in Atlantic City

Winzinger Inc. of Hainesport, New Jersey was the demolition contractor of the hotels along with CDI who controlled and planned the explosives. Heidi Winzinger's song "Queen of Atlantic City" is a folk rock song dedicated to the Blenheim Hotel's memory.
