= Madison Hotel (Atlantic City) =

Historic hotel in New Jersey, US

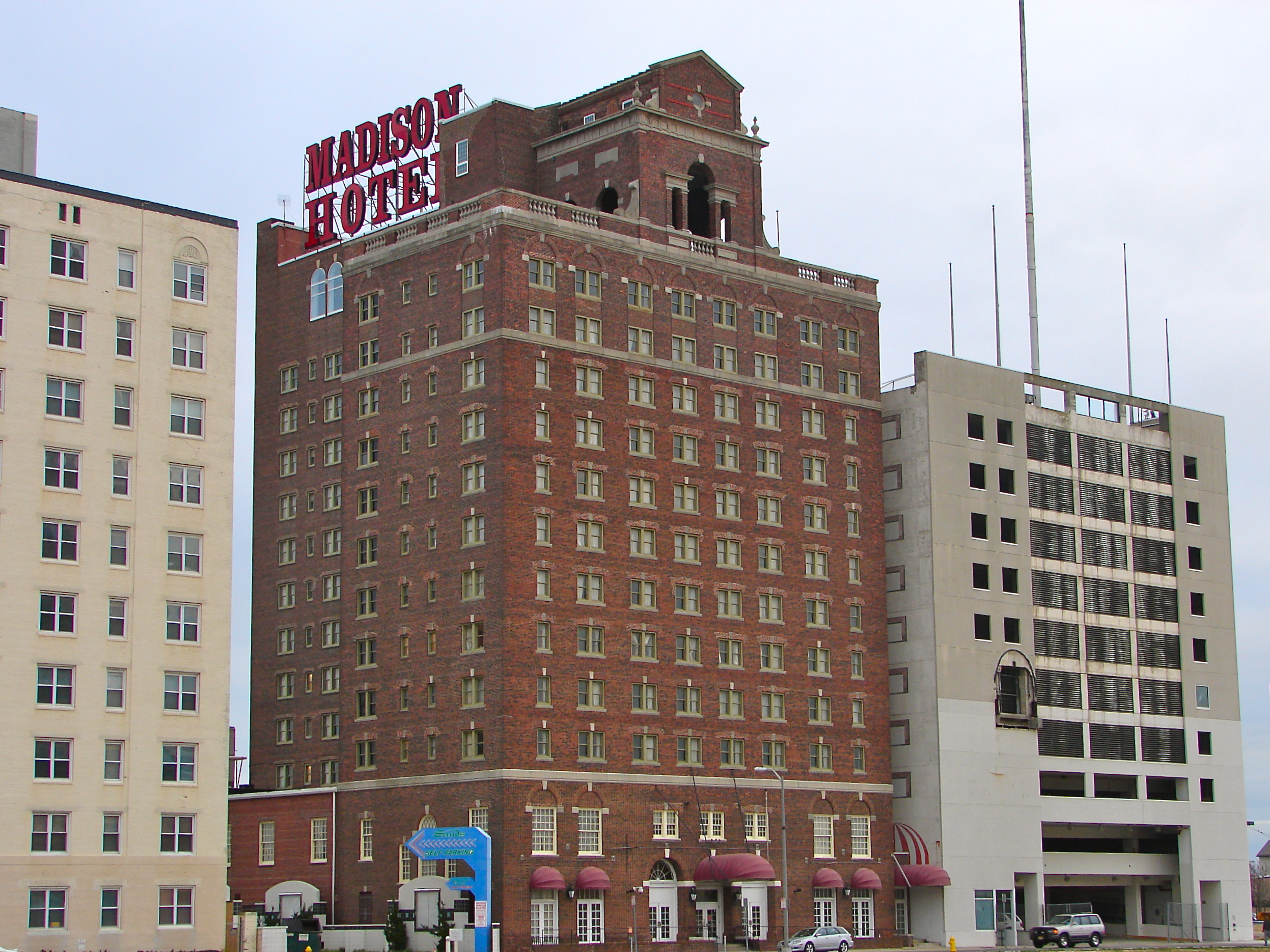
- Interactive map of the Madison Hotel area

General information
- Location: Atlantic City, New Jersey, 123 S. Martin Luther King Jr blvd
- Coordinates: 39°21′28″N 74°25′49″W
- Completed: 1929
- Opening: December 1929
- Renovated: 1956, 2004, 2013–14

Technical details
- Floor count: 14 (actually 13 but labeled 14 to prevent bad luck)

Design and construction
- Architects: Price & Walton

Other information
- Number of rooms: 126
- Number of suites: 126
- Parking: 200

- Madison Hotel
- U.S. National Register of Historic Places
- New Jersey Register of Historic Places
- Location within Atlantic County, New Jersey Location within New Jersey Location within the United States
- Area: 0.3 acres (0.12 ha)
- Architectural style: Colonial Revival, Georgian Revival
- NRHP reference No.: 84000506
- NJRHP No.: 399

Significant dates
- Added to NRHP: December 20, 1984
- Designated NJRHP: November 1, 1984

The Madison Hotel is an abandoned historic hotel located in Atlantic City, New Jersey, United States. Designed by Victor Gondos, Jr. of the Gondos Company of Philadelphia, it was built in 1929 and added to the National Register of Historic Places on December 20, 1984.

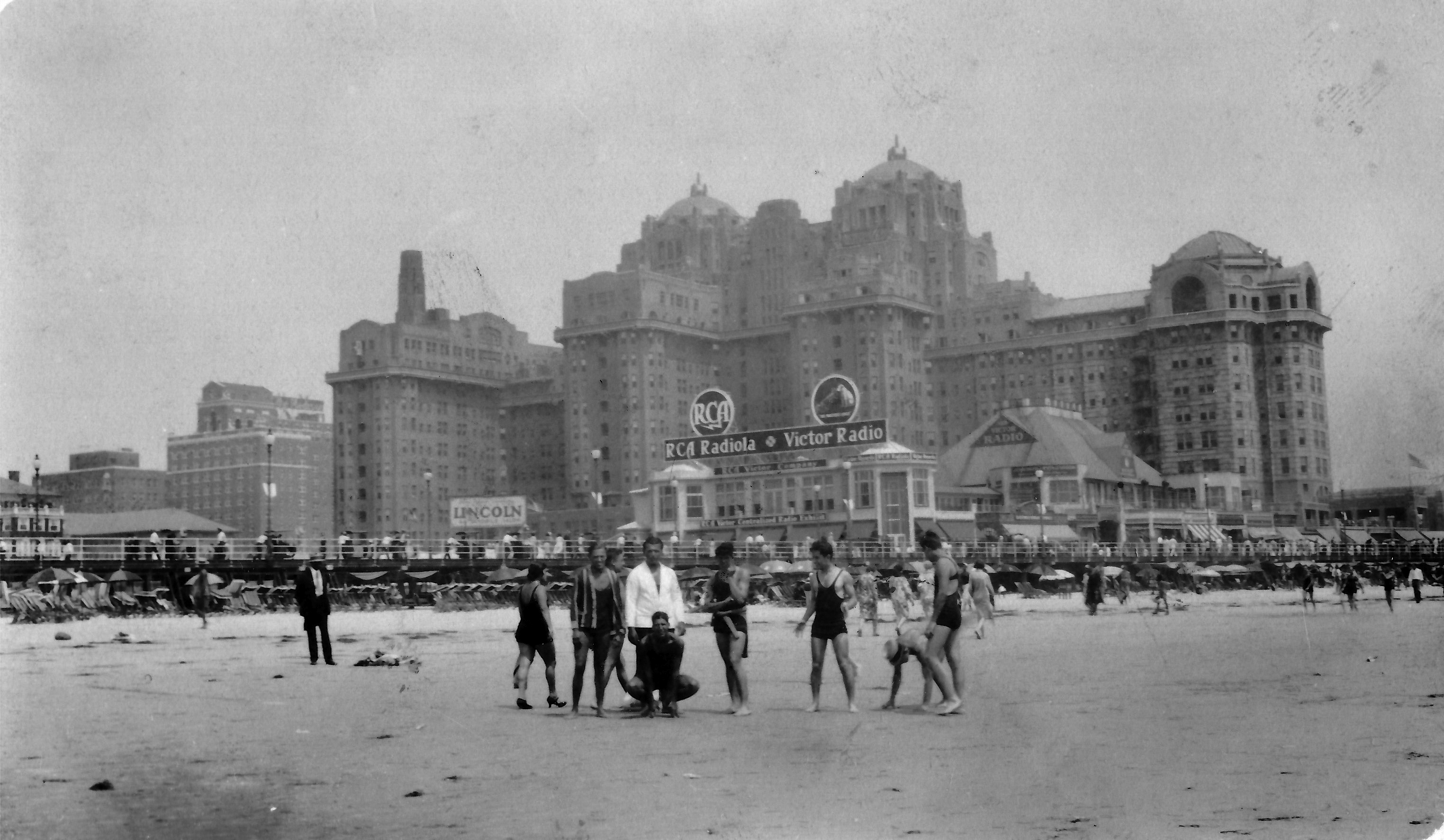
The Madison Hotel is visible to the left of the adjacent Traymore Hotel, c. 1930.

The 14-story building opened as a luxury hotel at the beginning of the Great Depression in the United States. It went through bankruptcy in the 1960s and later became a wing of the adjacent Sands Atlantic City.

In 2004, Sands invested $7 million to renovate and reconfigure the property into 126 suites. In 2006, the Sands closed.

On May 25, 2013, the Madison Hotel building was auctioned, with a winning bid of $4 million by Eli Hadad, an owner of hotels in Florida and the Dominican Republic. However, the purchase was not completed and the property was again offered for sale. In November 2013, the hotel was purchased by Ratan Hotel Group for $2.5 million.

On January 25, 2014 it reopened as Baymont Inn & Suites Atlantic City Madison Hotel, managed by the Baymont Inn & Suites chain.

By July 2023, the Madison Hotel had closed. The building was used as an illegal shelter, with no water or power. Roughly 30 squatters were cleared out by the City and the building was secured, with ground floor windows and doors boarded up.

In November 2024, the Madison Hotel was listed for sale on various real estate sites, with an asking price of $3.5M USD. The building was offered "as is".

== See also ==
- National Register of Historic Places listings in Atlantic County, New Jersey
- List of tallest buildings in Atlantic City
