= Jack Cook (disambiguation) =

Jack Cook may refer to:

- Jack Cook (footballer) (John Cook, 1887–1952), English footballer
- Jack Cook (baseball) (1926–2021), American baseball coach
- Jack Cook (born c. 1930), Canadian footballer for the BC Lions
- Jack Cook (footballer, born 1993), English footballer for Wealdstone F.C.

== See also ==
- John Cook
- Jack Cooke
