= MaerzMusik =

German music festival

MaerzMusik is a festival of the Berliner Festspiele and has been held annually since March 2002 at the Haus der Berliner Festspiele and other venues. It is the successor festival to the Musik-Biennale Berlin and is considered one of the most important festivals for Neue Musik in Germany. The artistic director of MaerzMusik is Kamila Metwaly.

== Musik-Biennale Berlin ==
MaerzMusik is the successor festival to the Berlin Music Biennale. Founded in 1967 in East Berlin, the International Festival of Contemporary Music was organised until 1989 by the union of composers and musicologists and the Ministry of Culture of the GDR as a biennale in February. From 1991 to 2001, the festival was continued under the direction of Heike Hoffmann by the Berliner Festspiele. Several important composers premiered works at the festival, including Friedrich Goldmann, Johannes Kalitzke, Georg Katzer, Siegfried Matthus and Ruth Zechlin.

== MaerzMusik ==
In March 2002, the festival took place for the first time under the new name "MaerzMusik – Festival für aktuelle Musik" (MaerzMusik – Festival for Contemporary Music) under its new artistic director Matthias Osterwold, also with a new programmatic orientation. Alongside new music in its current developments as well as in works of historical significance, there was a new "presentation of experimental, conceptual, interdisciplinary and also media-artistic positions." The works of other disciplines such as performing (music theatre, performance) or visual arts (sound art, installations) are included. Another focus was placed on non-European developments in music.

The program ranges from established positions of new music such as John Cage, Karlheinz Stockhausen, Wolfgang Rihm or Sofia Gubaidulina to younger composers such as Beat Furrer and Enno Poppe and visual artists such as Rebecca Horn and musicians from the field of electronic music such as Aphex Twin, Ryoji Ikeda and Stefan Goldmann. The transformed festival quickly became locally successful, for instance with Maerzmusik attracting around 15,000 visitors in 2014.

In autumn 2014, the Austrian musicologist and curator Berno Odo Polzer succeeded Matthias Osterwold as artistic director of the festival. He reconceived MaerzMusik as a "Festival for Time Issues", focusing on artistic positions about how to deal with time. Developed from the perspective of listening, the festival sees itself as a space in which "life, art, theory, experience and reflection can converge."

Since September 2022 Kamila Metwaly is the festival's artistic director. The curator and music journalist programmed the 2023 edition in collaboration with composer and conductor Enno Poppe.

== Venues ==
The festival's venues included the "Gelbe MUSIK", Gropius Bau, Hamburger Bahnhof, Haus der Berliner Festspiele, Hebbel-Theater, Maison de France, Jewish Museum Berlin, Kaiser Wilhelm Memorial Church, Kino Arsenal, Berliner Philharmonie, Konzerthaus Berlin, Kraftwerk Berlin, Radialsystem V, SAVVY Contemporary, Silent Greent, the Zeiss-Großplanetarium and the Berghain techno club.

== Discography ==
- 2000: Various artists: Musik-Biennale Berlin. Uraufführungen 1969–1995. (Red Seal) OCLC 47284999 – a compilation of orchestral works premiered at the festival between 1969 and 1995.
