= Reese Palley =

American art gallerist (1922–2015)

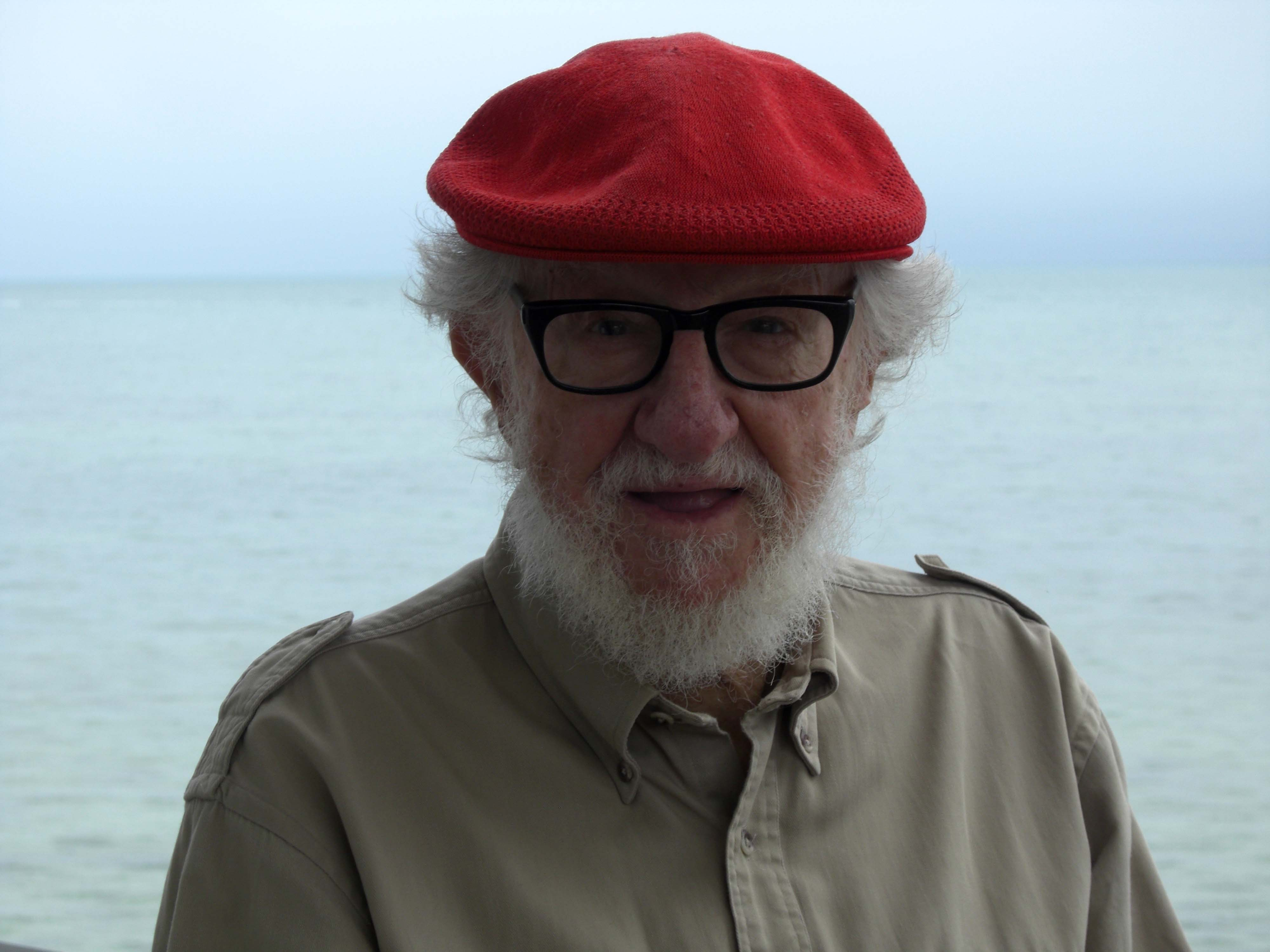
- Reese Palley in 2010
- Born: Reese Palley; 26 January 1922; Atlantic City, New Jersey, U.S.
- Died: 3 June 2015 (aged 93)
- Education: The New School (1945–1949); London School of Economics (1949–1952)
- Occupations: Art dealer, entrepreneur, author, sailor
- Children: 3
- Website: reesepalley.com

Reese Palley (26 January 1922 – 3 June 2015) was an entrepreneur, gallerist, art dealer, author, and sailor.

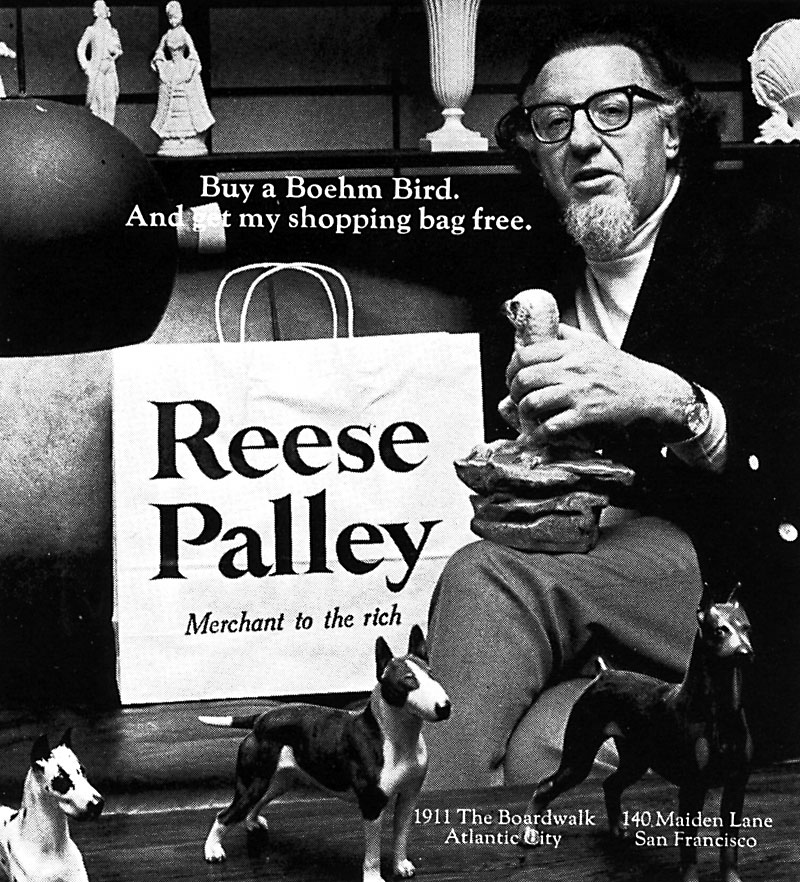
Merchant to the Rich

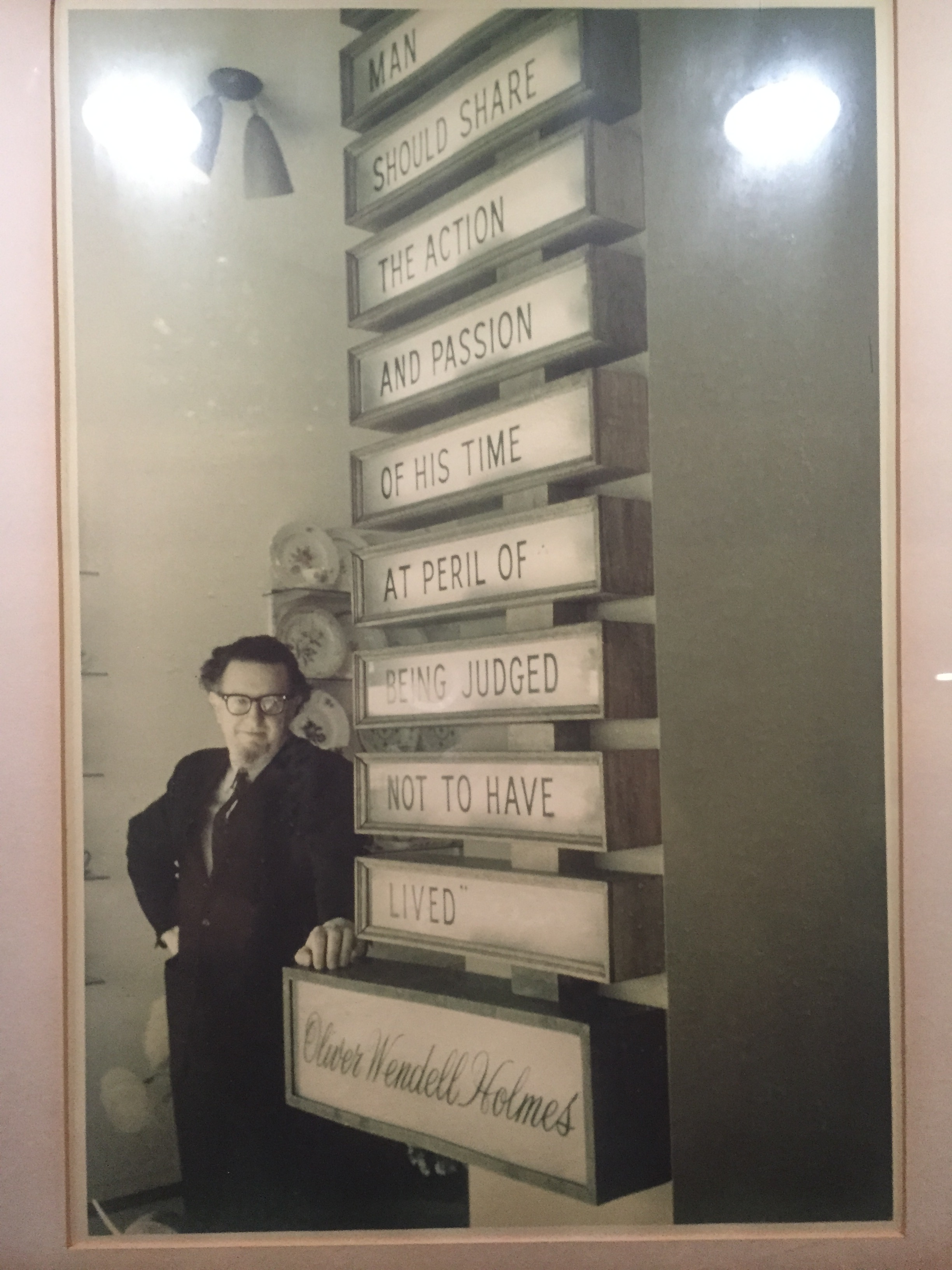
Palley at entrance to 1911 with Oliver Wendell Holmes quote, circa 1960

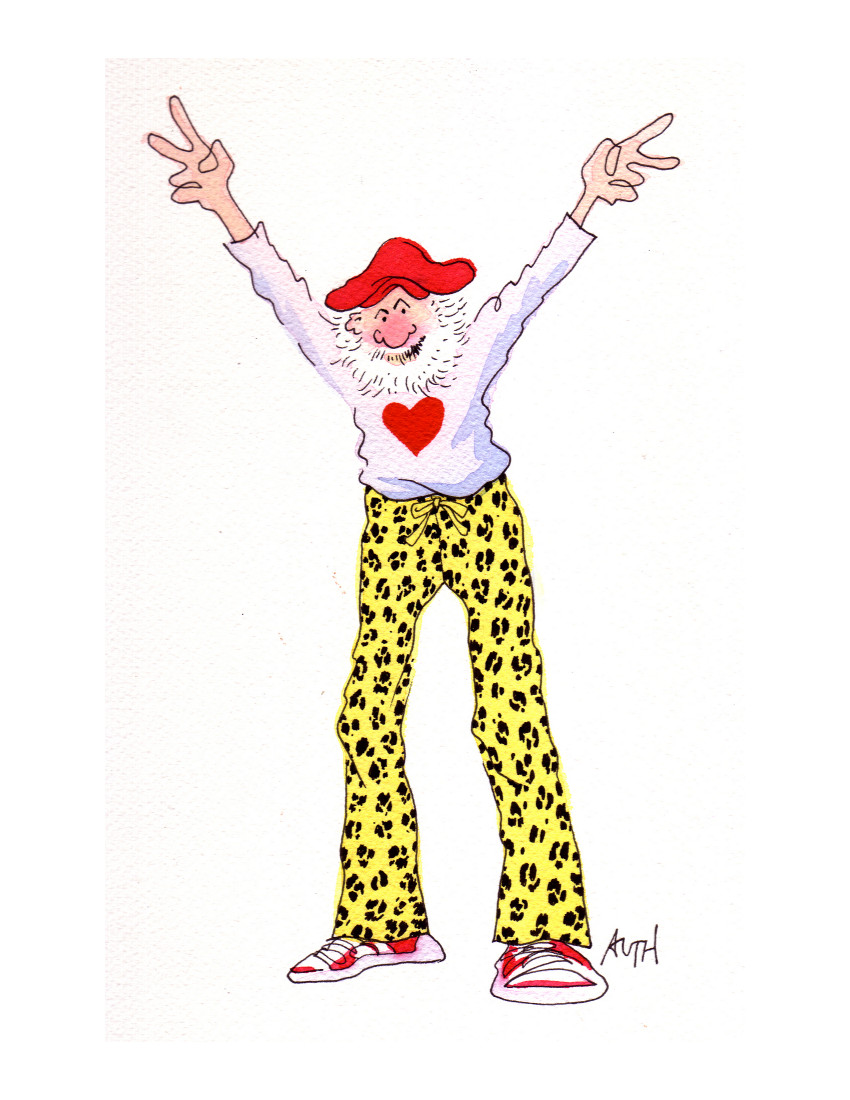
Cartoon of Palley by Tony Auth

== Biography ==
=== Art gallerist and real estate dealings ===
In 1957 he opened a gallery outside the Marlborough-Blenheim Hotel, selling Edward Marshall Boehm's porcelain figures of animals. From 1959 to 1979, he owned and operated Objet d'Art Galleries. In San Francisco, Palley restored the V. C. Morris Gift Shop at 140 Maiden Lane, the only example of a completed Frank Lloyd Wright building in San Francisco.

In 1976, Palley and a partner purchased the Marlborough-Blenheim for $6 million. They later rented it to Bally Manufacturing.

=== NJ Lottery Commission ethics violations ===
In 1983, Palley was suspended as chairman of the New Jersey Lottery commission by Governor Thomas Kean after he was charged with falsifying documents in an attempt thwart an ethics investigation into his conflict of interest. The ethics committee found that Palley sought money from a company bidding on a contract for the Lottery Commission. He pled guilty to a single charge of conspiracy to fabricate evidence in 1985.

=== Lorenzo de Medici Painting ===
He once purchased a painting for $2,600 that turned out to be one of the five lost paintings by Raphael, this one of Lorenzo de Medici. Believing the work to be a replica, Palley sold the artwork for $6,000 in 1964. After Palley sold the item, it was later authenticated as an original and auctioned at Christie's by a subsequent owner for $37.27 million in 2007.

=== Palley Index Of Danish Furniture ===
Palley with his wife, Marilyn Arnold Palley, created the Palley Index of Danish Furniture, 1900–2000 (now called the Furnitureindex), a compilation of over 12,000 works of Danish furniture of the 20th and 21st centuries.

=== Writing and alleged activities ===
In his book Unlikely Passages, he made claims to many alleged feats, including starting an airline company, starting a mushroom farm in caves, opening a sewing machine needle factory in Russia, smuggling a sought-after Torah out of Odessa, escaping Ethiopian gunboats on the Red Sea, and discussing ideas to run an island government with Tristan Jones.

== Bibliography ==
- The Porcelain Art of Edward Marshall Boehm (1976) ISBN 9780517653616
- Unlikely People (1998) ISBN 9781574090574
- Unlikely Passages (1998, with Susan LeVan) ISBN 9781574090512
- Call of the Ancient Mariner (2003) ISBN 9780071543064
- Call of the Ancient Mariner: Reese Palley's Guide to a Long Sailing Life (2003) ISBN 9780071388818
- There Be No Dragons: How to Cross a Big Ocean in a Small Sailboat (2004) ISBN 9781574091830
- Wooden Ships And Iron Men: The Maritime Art of Thomas Hoyne (2005, with Marilyn Arnold Palley) ISBN 9781593720131
- Concrete: A Seven-Thousand-Year History (2010) ISBN 9781593720391
- The Answer: Why Only Inherently Safe, Mini Nuclear Power Plants Can Save Our World (2011) ISBN 9781593720452
