= Volker Straebel =

German musicologist and music performer

Volker Straebel (born 1969) is a German musicologist and composer and performer of experimental music.

== Life ==
Straebel grew up in Berlin (West) where he was born. He studied musicology, philosophy and library science at the Technische Universität Berlin and the Humboldt-Universität zu Berlin (Magister Artium). As music journalist, among others for Der Tagesspiegel (1996–2001) and the Berliner Seiten der Frankfurter Allgemeine Zeitung (2001–2002), he documented contemporary music and sound art in Berlin. In 2002–14 he was curatorial advisor to the festival MaerzMusik of the Berliner Festspiele. Between 2009 and 2014, he was head of the Electronic Studio at the Audio Communication Department of the Technische Universität Berlin. 2015 Straebel took over as head of the Master's programme Sound Studies at the Universität der Künste Berlin, which he fundamentally reformed in 2017 as Sound Studies and Sonic Arts. In 2020, he was named Dean of The Herb Alpert School of Music and Richard Seaver Distinguished Chair in Music at the California Institute of the Arts (CalArts). Since 2026 he has been the head of the music archive of the Academy of Arts, Berlin.

Straebel researches and publishes on the history and aesthetics of experimental music and sound art. He is also active in these fields as a composer and performer.

== Work ==
=== Publications ===
- Musikalische Repräsentation geometrischer Objekte in Alvin Luciers Kammermusik, in Alvin Lucier, ed. Ulrich Tadday [=Musik-Konzepte 180/81]. Munich: Edition Text + Kritik 2018. ISBN 978-3-86916-650-6.
- Volker Straebel and Wilm Thoben: "Alvin Lucier’s ‚Music for Solo Performer" – Experimental Music Beyond Sonification," in Organised Sound 19:1 (April 2014). doi:10.1017/S135577181300037X
- "Medienmusik, in Akustische Grundlagen von Musik, ed. by Stefan Weinzierl. Handbuch der systematischen Musikwissenschaft, vol. 5. Laaber: Laaber Verlag 2014. ISBN 978-3-89007-699-7.
- "Anmerkungen zur Sonifikationsmetapher in der Instrumentalmusik," in Das geschulte Ohr. Eine Kulturgeschichte der Sonifikation, eds. Andi Schoon and Axel Volmar. Bielefeld: Transkript 2012. ISBN 978-3-8376-2049-8.
- From Reproduction to Performance: Media-Specific Music for Compact Disc, in Leonardo Music Journal 19 (2009). doi:10.1162/lmj.2009.19.23
- „Zur frühen Geschichte und Typologie der Klanginstallation,“ in Klangkunst, ed. Ulrich Tadday [=Musik-Konzepte, special issue]. München: Edition Text + Kritik 2008. ISBN 978-3-88377-953-9.
- „Technological implications of Phill Niblock’s drone music, derived from analytical observations of selected works for cello and string quartet on tape,“ in Organised Sound 13:3 (Dec. 2008). doi:10.1017/S1355771808000320; in deutscher Übersetzung: „Akustische Geographie. Komposition und Technologie in Phill Niblocks Drone-Musik,“ in: MusikTexte 132 (2012)

=== Pieces ===
- Chromatisch (8 Oktaven über 1/8 Hz), digital audio (silent), 2018. Released on Segmod, CD Dumpf Edition #12, Zürich 2019
- 101 W 18th St. (Sound Observation #8), sound installation, five channel digital audio, 2011/12. Group exhibition “Membra Disjecta for John Cage – Wanting to Say Something About John,” Freiraum Quartier21 International, MuseumsQuartier Vienna 2012
- "Every promise of the soul has innumerable fulfilments." Emerson attributes, for speaker and two-channel digital audio, 2010. The Wulf, Los Angeles
- Centre and Grand. Sound Observation #5, live diffusion of four-channel digital audio, 2010. Experimental Intermedia, New York
- Hegenbart/Straebel: 09-11-1938, sound installation in commemoration of “Kristallnacht”, 2008. Collegium Hungaricum, Berlin. In collaboration with Boris Hegenbart
- Guben, 1625, four-channel digital audio, 2001, Mex im Künstlerhaus Dortmund
- Mikado, solo performance with four-channel amplification, 1995. Freunde Guter Musik, Berlin

=== Realisations ===
- John Cage: Song Books with Concert for Piano and Orchestra, opening production of MaerzMusik 2012, Berlin. Joan La Barbara, artistic direction; Ne(x)tworks; Die Maulwerker; Volker Straebel, scenic dramaturgy; Martin Supper, sound direction; Harald Frings, light design
- John Cage: Aachen Musicircus on Europeras with Europera 4 and Fontana Mix, composed realization by Volker Straebel, directed by Ludger Engels. Commissioned by Theater Aachen, 2006
- John Cage: Urban Circus on Berlin Alexanderplatz, realization of Circus on based on Berlin Alexanderplatz by Alfred Döblin for speaker and 48-channel tape, 2001. Commissioned by Ultraschall Festival, Sender Freies Berlin, Berlin. Premiered by Hanns Zischler
