= Organized crime in Atlantic City =

Crime in New Jersey, U.S.

During the United States' Prohibition era (1920-1933), Atlantic City, New Jersey, began booming as a coastal resort town where gambling, prostitution and other illicit activities were allowed. Racketeering also took place in Atlantic City during Enoch L. Johnson's term as mayor. Johnson was connected to the Italian mafia, which began operations in South Jersey during Prohibition. Its primary focus was to smuggle alcohol and rum in from Italy through ships and trade. As a result of letting the mafia flourish in the city, Enoch L. Johnson enjoyed kickbacks. His net worth soared and he earned as much as $500,000 annually from the illicit trade.

The Italian mafia was supported by Nucky Johnson's Organization, a Republican political machine founded by Louis Kuehnle, the "pioneer" of Atlantic City. Kuehnle was prosecuted by then-Governor Woodrow Wilson, as part of Wilson's promise to clean up Atlantic City's political machine and corruption. Kuehnle was convicted in 1911. After the conviction, Atlantic City's undersheriff Smith Johnson's son Nucky Johnson took the reins of the regime. Nucky led the organization for 30 years and led it to its highest point ever. He also became the secretary of the Atlantic City Republican Executive Committee, a very powerful arm of the machine. He was also Atlantic County treasurer from 1914 to 1941.

== Bootlegging era ==
After the political machine was established by the Italian mafia with help from the Jewish mob, Prohibition went into effect in Atlantic City, which led to Johnson pursuing the bootlegging business. He allied himself with several other well-known bootleggers, including: Arnold Rothstein (New York's Jewish mob boss), Charlie Luciano (Masseria family lieutenant), Johnny Torrio (Chicago South Side Gang boss), and Benny Siegel (Bugs and Meyer Mob boss).

Bootlegging proved very successful in the town, and soon Johnson's term was over. Edward Bader, a politician and owner of a construction business, became mayor of Atlantic City through Nucky Johnson's lobbying. He built the Atlantic City Convention Hall in 1920, and a few years later, a crime conference took place in the new hall. It settled territorial disputes between the Italian mafia and Jewish mob, while also boosting relations between crime syndicates across the nation. Notable attendees and founders of the conference were La Cosa Nostra Masseria crime family lieutenant Charlie Luciano and the former boss of Chicago's South Side Gang Johnny Torrio. Meyer Lansky and Benny Siegel (bosses of the Bugs and Meyer Mob) served as the muscle/security at the conference. Delegates included several notable Jewish and Italian mobsters, including: Alphonse "Scarface" Capone (boss of the Chicago Outfit)—who was fighting a war with the Genna brothers against Dean O'Banion's North Side Gang—, Frank Costello and Joe Adonis (lieutenants in the Masseria family), Max Hoff (Philadelphia Jewish mob boss), Abe Bernstein (Purple Gang boss), Carlo Gambino (D'Aquila family lieutenant), and Gaetano Lucchese (Reina family lieutenant).

== Johnson's arrest ==
In 1941, Enoch Johnson was convicted of tax evasion charges and was sentenced to 10 years in a federal prison and fined $20,000. Following his conviction, New Jersey Senator Frank "Hap" Farley took over the organization.

== Farley's reign ==
From 1941 through the machine's demise in 1971, Frank Farley served in the New Jersey Legislature for a record 34 years, and was the longest-serving boss of Nucky's organization. The machine was finally broken in 1971 after Dr. Joseph McGahn, the Democratic Party candidate for the assembly seat defeated Farley. Mafia operations continued, but to a lesser extent.
