= Nucky Johnson's Organization =

Informative insight into Atlantic City's underbelly during the early, 1900's

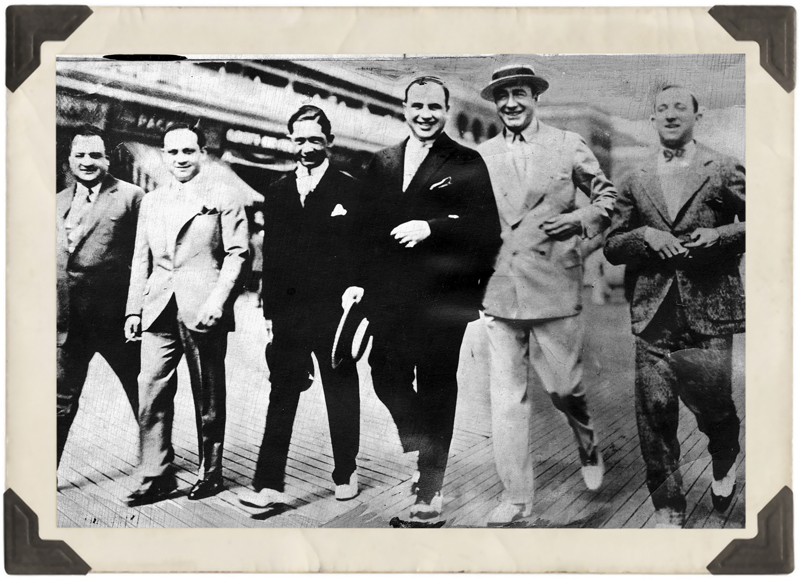
- Enoch "Nucky" Johnson (second from right) and Alphonse "Scarface" Capone (third from right) this picture has also been proven to be photoshop on the boardwalk during the Atlantic City Conference
- Founded: 1870s
- Founded by: Louis Kuehnle
- Founding location: Atlantic City, Atlantic County, NJ; USA
- Years active: c. 1870s–1970s
- Territory: South Jersey
- Ethnicity: Scots-Irish Americans, German Americans
- Criminal activities: Racketeering, illegal gambling, prostitution, bootlegging, number writing, bribery, bookmaking, police corruption, political corruption, extortion, money laundering, smuggling, and drug trafficking
- Allies: Charlie Luciano (boss Genovese crime family), Johnny Torrio (member Chicago crime family), Benny Siegel (boss Bugs and Meyer Mob), Frank Hague (Democratic Party politician), Walter Evans Edge (Republican party politician) and Arnold Rothstein (boss Rothstein Syndicate)

Nucky Johnson's Organization was a corrupt political machine based in Atlantic City, New Jersey that held power during the Prohibition era. Its boss, Enoch "Nucky" Johnson, coordinated the Organizations' bootlegging, gambling, racketeering, and prostitution activities.

== Origins ==
=== Early history ===
Before the rise of German American political boss Louis "Commodore" Kuehnle and Scots-Irish American treasurer Nucky Johnson, Atlantic City's government was run by a three-man group, including: Atlantic County Clerk Lewis P. Scott (1854–1907) and Congressman John J. Gardner (1845–1921), and Mays Landing sheriff and Atlantic City undersheriff Smith E. Johnson.

== New regime ==
After the conviction of Kuehnle in 1911, Smith Johnson's son became boss of the organization. Under his son's new regime, the organization would enjoy the most successful 30 years in its history.

=== Nucky's paradise and prohibition ===
Smith Johnson's son Enoch Lewis "Nucky" Johnson was born in 1883. Nucky became undersheriff in 1905 while his father was sheriff of Atlantic City. The younger Johnson was eventually elected sheriff in 1908. In 1909, he became secretary of the Atlantic County Republican Executive Committee. After the conviction of Kuehnle on corruption charges in 1911, the younger Johnson became boss of the organization.

Johnson also held several other jobs, including: Atlantic County Treasurer (1914–1941), County Tax Collector, publisher of a weekly newspaper, bank director, president of a building and loan company, and director of a Philadelphia brewery.

Johnson was known to be a very well dressed and nice man who would rarely say no. He wore tailored suits, owned the entire ninth floor of the Ritz-Carlton Hotel, and he owned a chauffeur-driven $14,000 1920 powder blue Rolls-Royce Silver Ghost; which was his trademark car. It was known that when Nucky prospered, everyone prospered in his organization and the city. Johnson once explained, "When I lived well, everybody lived well." Johnson has been described as running his criminal-political empire with a "velvet hammer".

When Prohibition went in effect in Atlantic City in January 1920, Johnson and his organization went straight into the bootlegging business. He allied himself with several other well-known bootleggers, including: Arnold Rothstein (New York's Jewish mob boss), Charlie Luciano (Masseria family lieutenant), Johnny Torrio (Chicago South Side Gang boss), and Benny Siegel (Bugs and Meyer Mob boss).

Nucky had also helped Republican building constructor Edward Bader get elected as mayor in 1920. And through Bader's construction business, he built the Atlantic City Convention Hall in 1929.

Johnson and Luciano began forming the Big Seven during the mid-to-late 1920s. The group was supposed to help solve bootlegging disputes and serve as a predecessor to the National Crime Syndicate in the 1930s. It was around this time that Johnson met a bellhop at the Ritz, named Jimmy Boyd; the two took an instant liking to each other. Johnson began grooming Boyd to become the next boss of his organization, and soon, Boyd was Nucky's top enforcer/right-hand man and controlled all of the brothels, casinos, speakeasies, and numbers rackets in Atlantic City.

==== Atlantic City Conference ====
From 13 to 16 May 1929, Johnson hosted the Atlantic City Conference at the Ritz-Carlton and Ambassador Hotels on the boardwalk. Johnson made arrangements for the attendees accommodations and guaranteed there would be no interference from law enforcement since his brother, Alfred Johnson was the sheriff of Atlantic County.

The leaders that thought of the conference were: La Cosa Nostra Masseria crime family lieutenant Charlie Luciano and the former boss of Chicago's South Side Gang Johnny Torrio. Meyer Lansky and Benny Siegel (bosses of the Bugs and Meyer Mob) served as security at the conference. Delegates included several notable Jewish and Italian mobsters, including: Alphonse "Scarface" Capone (boss of the Chicago Outfit)—who was fighting a war with the Genna brothers against Dean O'Banion's North Side Gang—, Frank Costello and Joe Adonis (lieutenants in the Masseria family), Max Hoff (Philadelphia Jewish mob boss), Abe Bernstein (Purple Gang boss), Carlo Gambino (D'Aquila family lieutenant), and Gaetano Lucchese (Reina family lieutenant).

Johnson's enforcer Jimmy Boyd is never mentioned by anyone as being at the convention, but since Boyd was Nucky's right-hand man and an important figure in the organization, it is most likely that he was there to help make decisions for the organization.

During the late 1930s and early 1940s, FBI special agent William Frank and his team investigated the activities of Johnson and his organization but were unable to find evidence of wrongdoing.

=== Frank Farley ===
In 1941, Johnson was convicted of tax evasion charges and was sentenced to 10 years in a federal prison and fined $20,000. Following his conviction, New Jersey Senator Frank "Hap" Farley took over the organization.

== In television ==
Nucky's organization is featured in the HBO series Boardwalk Empire, but is named Nucky Thompson's Organization; since instead of Nucky Johnson, his name is Nucky Thompson. Many members of the Thompson organization are based on or were in the Johnson organization; for example: Edward Bader, Frank Hague, Louis "Commodore" Kaestner (based on Louis "Commodore" Kuehnle), Jimmy Darmody (based on Jimmy Boyd), and Eddie Kessler (based on Johnson's German valet Louis Kessel).

In the show, the organization is an official rival of Dr. Valentin Narcisse (based on Casper Holstein), Charlie Luciano, Meyer Lansky, Benjamin Siegel, George Remus, the D'Alessio Brothers, and an unofficial rival of Arnold Rothstein and Joe Masseria. The organization is allied with Al Capone, Johnny Torrio, Ralph Capone, Frank Capone, Arnold Rothstein, and Salvatore Maranzano.

== List of known members ==
This is a list of the known members in the history of the organization:

=== Administration ===
==== Bosses ====
- 1870s-1890s — (three-man ruling panel) — John J. Gardner, Louis P. Scott and Smith E. Johnson — Kuehnle became boss in late 1890s.
- Louis "Commodore" Kuehnle: 1890s-1911—Organization's founder; born in 1857, died in 1934 (76 years old).
- Enoch "Nucky" Johnson: 1911-1941—Organization's second leader; Atlantic City treasurer; born in 1883, died in 1968 (85 years old).
- Frank "Hap" Farley: 1941-1970s—Organization's last leader; New Jersey State Senator; born in 1901, died in 1977 (75 years old).

==== Lieutenants ====
- Smith E. Johnson: 1890s-1910s—sheriff-undersheriff of Atlantic City; Johnson's father; born in ?, died in ?.
- Enoch "Nucky" Johnson: 1900s-1911—sheriff-undersheriff of Atlantic City; became boss in 1909; born in 1883, died in 1968 (85 years old).
- James "Jimmy" Boyd: 1920s-1970s—Fourth Ward boss; Nucky and Farley's top enforcer; born in 1906, died in 1974 (67 years old).
- Herman "Stumpy" Orman: 1920s-1970s—Boyd's partner; racketeer and protection money collector; born in ?, died in ?
- Alfred Higabee "Alf" Johnson: mid 1910s-1940s—Atlantic County Sheriff; Nucky Johnson's brother; born in 1878, died in 1958 (80 years old).

=== Other members ===
==== Lower ranks ====
- Paul "Skinny" D'Amato: 1920s–1970s—illegal casino owner; Chicago Outfit and New Orleans crime family associate; born in 1908, died in 1984 (75 years old).
- John Martino: 1920s–1940s—illegal casino owner-loan shark-bookmaker; Chicago Outfit and Trafficante crime family associate; born in 1910, died in 1975 (65 years old).
- Fred Masucci: 1930s–1950s—Numbers operator; born in ?, died in ?
- Ben Rubenstein: 1930s-1950s—Numbers operator and Masucci's partner; possibly Jewish mob associate; born in ?, died in ?
- Harold Scheper: 1920s-1950s—Numbers operator; operated in the black community; born in ?, died in ?
- Harry "Cherry" Haggerty: 1930s–1960s—Numbers operator and Scheper's partner; probation with Scheper since 1947 during the Kefauver Committee; born in ?, died in ?
- Francis B. Gribbin: Heroic police officer who fought against illegal gambling in Atlantic City. He and the other members of the "Four Horseman" were framed for shaking down the illegal gambling clubs and jailed. It was untrue - they were the ones who acted against illegal gaming when the Atlantic City Police Department didn't.
- Jack Portock: 19??–1940s—Former corrupt policeman; part of the "Four Horsemen"; born in ?, died in ?
- Frederick J. Warlich: 1919–1996;Former policeman, part of the "Four Horsemen", who fought against corruption, by shutting down Nucky's illegal gambling rings.
- Francis L. Smith: 19??–1951—Former racketeer; witness at the Kefauver Committee; born in ?, died in ?
- Joseph McBeth: 19??–1950s—Treasurer of the Republican County Committee; born in ?, died in ?
- Lester Burdick: 19??–1950s—Race-wire service operator; born in ?, died in ?
- Louis Kessel: ??1941—Nucky's German assistant and valet; born in ?, died in ?.

==== Associates ====
- Frank Hague: 1916?1950s—Jersey City's mayor; Johnson's Democratic ally and political boss in Hudson County; born in 1876, died in 1956 (79 years old).
- Harry M. Daugherty: ????–1941—Attorney General; Warren Harding's campaign manager; born in 1860, died in 1941 (81 years old).
- Arnold Rothstein: 1920-1928—Bootlegger-gambler; New York's Jewish mob boss; born in 1882, died in 1928 (46 years old).
- Charles Luciano: 1920–1940s—Bootlegger and American Mafia boss; Luciano crime family boss and Commission founder; born in 1897, died in 1962 (64 years old).
- Johnny Torrio: 1910s–1940s—Former Chicago South Side Gang boss; Johnson's longtime friend; born in 1882, died in 1957 (75 years old).
- Meyer Lansky: 1920s–1950s—Founder of The Bugs and Meyer Mob; Luciano's Jewish counterpart; born in 1902, died in 1983 (80 years old).
- Benny Siegel: 1920s–1947—Boss of The Bugs and Meyer Mob; provided the muscle for the gang; born in 1906, died in 1947 (41 years old).
