= Collingwood Manor massacre =

1931 American gang killing

- Location: Collingwood Manor Apartments 1740 Collingwood Avenue; Detroit, Michigan
- Date: September 16, 1931
- Target: Joseph "Nigger (Note: At the time, this racial epithet was often applied to people with relatively dark hair or skin complexion, even if they were not of African ancestry.) Joe" Lebowitz
- Attack type: Massacre
- Deaths: Joseph Lebowitz; Herman "Hymie" Paul; Isadore "Izzy the Rat" Sutker
- Perpetrator: The Purple Gang

The Collingwood Manor massacre was an infamous hit on three Chicago gunmen by the notorious Purple Gang on September 16, 1931, after the men had betrayed the trust of the others in the gang.

== Background ==
In 1927, three gunmen, Joseph "Nigger Joe" Lebowitz, Herman "Hymie" Paul, and Isadore "Izzy the Rat" Sutker, shook down Chicago speakeasy operators for protection money. Unknown to them, the victims were under Al Capone's syndicate for purchasing liquor from his suppliers. After finding that out, Capone gave the men an ultimatum: they could leave Chicago willingly or in a box. Willingly, the men fled to Detroit.

At the time, the Purple Gang was on top of their game running Detroit's underworld, operating gambling, local wire service, drug distribution, bootlegging, certain trade unions, as well as extortion rackets. After arriving in the city, the Chicago gunmen soon became affiliated with a smaller faction of the Purple Gang, the "Little Jewish Navy". They would use member-owned speedboats to run liquor from Canada to Detroit. Trust would soon be lost between the men and the Purple Gang. Lebowitz, Paul, and Sutker hijacked members of the gang and preyed on other local gang members, disregarding their territories. Trying to establish themselves as an independent power, they became known as the "Third Avenue Terrors". Trying to take over Detroit's underworld, which was controlled mainly by the Purple Gang, was going to be a hard task, and the Gang was not going to let that happen easily.

== Massacre ==
After failing to pay back past debts to the Purple Gang, Ray Bernstein, one of the founders of the gang, developed a plan to kill the Third Avenue Terrors. Bernstein would use Sol Levine as an unknown accomplice to the crime. Levine was a good friend of both groups. The plan started by buying an apartment at the Collingwood Manor Apartments. Bernstein then convinced Levine that the Purples had decided to let Lebowitz, Paul, and Sutker be their agents in the liquor business. A meeting was apparently set up to meet with Levine and the other men later.

The meeting was called on September 16, 1931. Levine and the men met up at 1740 Collingwood Avenue. After engaging in a quick conversation, Bernstein left to go start the getaway car. He waited for the sound of backfiring and honking the horn to cue the men left in the apartment to carry out the plan. Fleisher stood, pulled out a .38 caliber revolver, and shot Lebowitz at point-blank range. Irving Milberg and Harry Keywell jumped up and began to shoot. That was not the first major massacre carried out by Keywell, who also took part in the St. Valentine's Day Massacre, along with other Purple Gang members. Keywell emptied his revolver into Sutker and Milberg emptied his into Paul. While all of that was happening, Sol Levine watched helplessly as the men scrambled to save their lives.

== Aftermath ==
After the crime, Bernstein, Keywell, Milberg, and Fleisher fled the scene, leaving Sol Levine as the sole eyewitness. The police took him into their headquarters and, after long interrogation, Levine finally confessed to seeing the murders take place and to who did it. The guns used in the crime had their serial numbers scratched off and were thrown into paint to try to get rid of any evidence linking back to the members of the Purple Gang.

A ballistics test, taken shortly afterward, proved that the guns had been used in the murders of Lebowitz, Paul, and Sutker. After the confession, an anonymous call was received by the detectives' office. The message stated: "Two of the men you want for the Collingwood Murder are at 2649 Calvert. They will be out of town within the hour." Heavily armed, the police went to the location, which was owned by Charles Aurbach, an underworld consultant and Purple Gang member. Ray Bernstein and Harry Keywell were arrested in their pajamas. The following night, Irving Milberg was arrested while preparing to skip town, but Fleisher disappeared.

== Trial ==
The examination for the Collingwood Manor massacre began on September 30, 1931. Sol Levine appeared at the pre-trial but was frightened to testify against the men. Levine pointed to Bernstein, Keywell, and Milberg as the men who killed Lebowitz, Paul, and Sutker. He said that Harry Fleisher also took part in the shooting, but Fleisher was not present at the time. During his testimony, Levine focused solely on the prosecutor and did not once look at the accused men. In contrast, Bernstein, Keywell, and Milberg focused mainly on Levine, glaring at him during the trial. On October 2, 1931, the men were arraigned before Judge Donald Van Zile after a motion for dismissal of Levine's claim was denied. An order was issued for the men to be held without bond.

Testimony for the case began on November 2, 1931. Levine began his account of what happened on the day of the massacre. Eight detectives constantly guarded him and ten stood guard during the trial, with four on point as he testified, as he feared he would be killed during the case. Witness after witness went to the stand and testified against the gang members, claiming to have seen them run from the building after hearing gunshots. After an hour and 37 minutes, the jury returned with the verdict, finding the men guilty of the charge of first-degree murder. The members of the Purple Gang were convicted and sentenced to life in prison without parole and were sent to Marquette Prison. Chief of Detectives James E. McCarty made a statement to the press: "This conviction is the greatest accomplishment in years. Not only does it break the back of the Purple Gang but it serves notice on other mobs that murder doesn't go anymore in Detroit." It was the beginning of the end for the notorious Purple Gang.

On June 9, 1932, Harry Fleisher surprised the prosecutor by strolling into the prosecutor's office with attorneys to turn himself in on the warrant for the Collingwood Manor massacre. During the nine months that he was missing he had been a suspect in many major crimes, including the kidnapping of Lindbergh's baby. By July 25, 1932, the prosecutor, Harry Toy, was forced to admit that eyewitness Solly Levine could not be found. The case against Harry Fleisher was eventually dismissed and the judgment against Bernstein, Keywell & Milberg was held. There was the option to reopen the case if new evidence was ever discovered.

== See also ==
- List of homicides in Michigan
- Abe Bernstein
- List of Jewish American mobsters
- Joseph Zerilli
