= James H. Boyd (Atlantic City politician) =

American politician and criminal (1906–1974)

Jimmy Boyd

Atlantic City Fourth Ward Alderman
- In office Late 1920s – Early 1970s

Atlantic County Legislator on Atlantic Board of Freeholders
- In office 1930s–1970s

Personal details
- Born: James H. Boyd; November 5, 1906 Philadelphia, Pennsylvania, United States
- Died: April 11, 1974 (aged 67) Atlantic City, New Jersey, United States
- Party: Republican
- Spouse: Marie E. Boyd
- Education: Princeton University
- Occupation: Politician, racketeer, bootlegger, soldier, bellhop
- Awards: World War II Victory Medal; EAME Medal; Bronze Star
- Nickname: Boydie

Military service
- Allegiance: US Army, 79th Infantry Division
- Years of service: 1942–1945
- Battles/wars: World War II; Normandy; Northern France; Rhineland; Central Europe

James Howlett Boyd (November 5, 1906 – April 11, 1974) was an Atlantic City politician and criminal, who served under corrupt Atlantic County treasurer Enoch “Nucky” Johnson and New Jersey Senator Frank S. Farley.

== Early life ==
James H. Boyd was born on November 5, 1906, in Philadelphia, Pennsylvania, United States.

== Prohibition ==
Boyd was working as a bellhop at the Ritz-Carlton Hotel during the time Prohibition went into effect in 1920. But, soon Boyd started to move up to the chain of command in corrupt Atlantic City treasurer and Southern Jersey boss Enoch “Nucky” Johnson's organization. Boyd and Johnson met around the time that Johnson and Charlie Luciano were forming the Big Seven and they took an instant liking to each other; Johnson began grooming Boyd to become the next boss in his organization. He later became Johnson's right-hand man. He oversaw speakeasies, brothels, illegal casinos, and the numbers rackets. Boyd was also Johnson's and future boss Farley's top enforcer.

=== Personal life ===
Boyd was married to Marie Elizabeth Derro.

== Frank Farley ==
After Johnson was convicted of tax evasion in 1941, New Jersey State Senator Frank S. Farley took control of Atlantic City's political machine. In order to create a “bridge” between the new and old regimes, Boyd was appointed the overseer of all operations in Atlantic City. He also became the executive chairman of the Fourth Ward Republican Club and assistant clerk and clerk of the Atlantic Board of Freeholders and boss of the fourth ward. Under the regime of Farley, Boyd was known as a vicious man.

=== World War II ===
Boyd enlisted as a private in the Army in June 1942 during World War II. From 1942 to 1945, Boyd was a soldier in the 79th Infantry Division. He served in the Normandy battles, Northern France campaign, the Rhineland battles, and in Central Europe.

== Death ==
Boyd died in his home on April 11, 1974, of cancer, at the age of 67. Prior to her death in 2006, his wife established the James H. Boyd Memorial Scholarship at the Atlantic Cape Community College, worth $10,000.

== Television adaptation ==
Jimmy Darmody in the first two seasons of the HBO show Boardwalk Empire is, to some degree, based on Boyd. The fictional version of Boyd is a World War I veteran with a son and a wife. In the show, his father is Louis “Commodore” Kaestner (based on Louis “Commodore” Kuehnle) and his one-time mentor is corrupt Atlantic City treasurer and political boss Enoch “Nucky” Thompson (based on Enoch L. Johnson).

In the show, Darmody's associates/friends include: Lucky Luciano, Meyer Lansky, Al Capone, Johnny Torrio, Richard Harrow, and Mickey Doyle (based on Mickey Duffy).
