= Keywell =

Keywell is a surname. Notable people with the surname include:

- Brad Keywell (born 1969), American businessman
- Harry Keywell (1910–1997), American criminal, member of Detroit's Purple Gang
