= Club Manitou of Harbor Springs =

Former resort in Harbor Springs, Michigan, US

Coordinates: 45°25′58″N 84°59′22″W

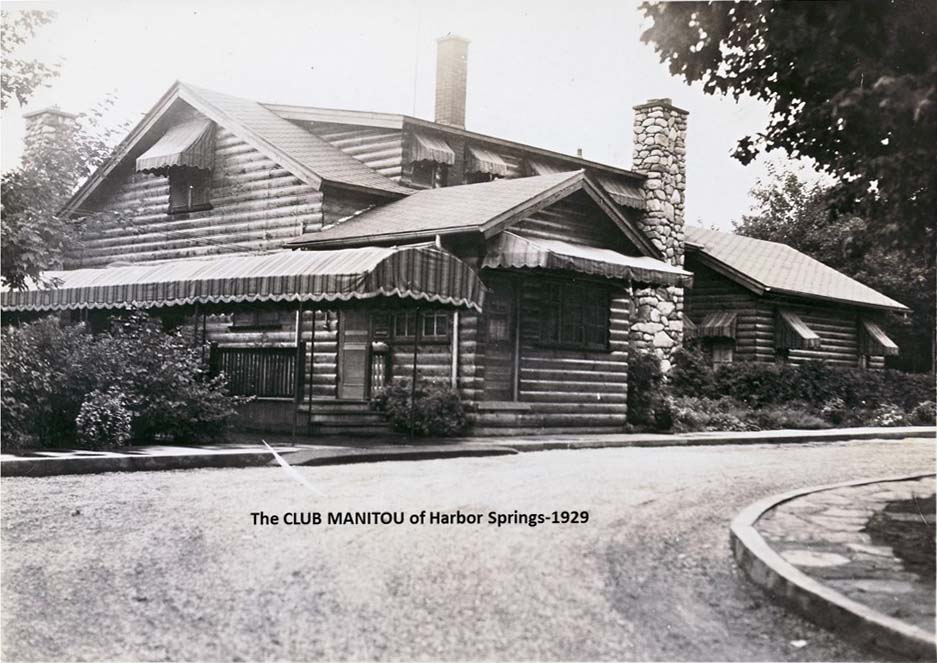
Club Manitou

Club Manitou was an infamous mid-west summer resort nightclub-casino located in Harbor Springs in northern Michigan, United States, that existed from 1929 until 1952. It was a speakeasy run by The Purple Gang during Prohibition and the Great Depression years featuring a hidden basement of gambling and alcohol for wealthy Midwestern summer resort goers.

== Introduction ==
Northwest northern lower Michigan has been the mid-west's summer playground for the wealthy since the 1890s. The Swifts, Armours, Wrigleys/Offields, Gambles (Procter & Gamble), Fords and Wilsons (GM) all called northern Michigan's Harbor Springs-Petoskey area their summer home. The 1930s era of northwest lower Michigan was particularly a time of gala summer resort tourism despite the United States being in the throes of a deepening Great Depression. Besides Mackinac Island, the top summer resort town in the area, known as the "Tip of the Mitt," was Harbor Springs, a small village located on Little Traverse Bay. The bay, on Lake Michigan, was a sail boater's paradise. Petoskey, Michigan, located across the bay from Harbor Springs, was the first small northern Lake Michigan town to draw a summer clientele interested in relief from the city heat. Harbor Springs soon followed. Mid-western city dwellers also came north for the freedom from the suffering of hay fever and other allergies.

== The Manitou ==
From the late 1870s into the 20th Century's early years, the wealthy mid-westerners from Chicago, Cincinnati, Cleveland, Detroit and St. Louis came north every summer via the many summer railroad passenger trains to Charlevoix, Petoskey, Mackinaw City (Mackinac Island) and Harbor Springs. They also came north via the Great Lakes on passenger steamships such as the "Manitou." The passenger cruise steamer was the source of Harbor Springs, Michigan's famous Club Manitou, which opened July 4 week-end in 1929. It was the dream of Abe Bernstein of Detroit, Michigan. Bernstein was the head of the infamous Purple Gang of southeastern Michigan. He and his operatives controlled the import of illegal whiskey from Canada across the Detroit River into Michigan. From there it went to other mid-western cities such as Cleveland, Chicago, and St. Louis. Bernstein loved to spend his summers in Petoskey and Harbor Springs. While there he saw the tremendous wealth of the summer resorters who loved to drink and loved to gamble.

== Naples of the North ==
By the late 1920s, Harbor Springs was being referred to as the "Naples of the North". Wealthy mid-westerns would spend their summers at their Harbor Springs-Petoskey cottages, resorts, and hotels. In the winter, the same group would gather in places like Naples, Florida. Many of the wealthy cottages had summer homes in the Harbor Point Association, the Roaring Brook Association, the Wequetonsing Association, and other private residential summer enclaves. All had grown up along the Harbor Springs area's vast Little Traverse Bay-Lake Michigan shoreline. These affluent summer people came north for the July 4 through Labor Day "Summer Season", and they dined and drank first at the Harbor Point Casino, then the Roaring Brook Casino, and after July 4, 1929, the new Club Manitou. The club was built with Abe Bernstein's Purple Gang profits and managed by his onetime driver and bodyguard, William "Slim" Al Gerhart.

== Prohibition in Michigan's Northland ==
Michigan instituted a prohibition against the selling of alcoholic spirits in 1917, two years before National Prohibition. That meant that the Purple Gang of Detroit had a head start learning how to thwart the law. The gang, under the Bernstein brothers direction, and Abe Bernstein in particular, developed a network of illegal smuggling methods that kept Detroit, Michigan, Indiana, Ohio and Al Capone's Chicago supplied with illegal booze. When the mid-western wealthy summer resorters came to Harbor Springs for their summer season they brought with them their desire for top-notch restaurant dining, top-shelf liquors and wines. Also came with them their desire to gamble, and that desire, along with fine dining, was filled by the Club Manitou. Not one advertisement was placed to announce the establishment's opening but, from word of mouth only, it was an instant success. Upstairs fine dining, and downstairs (in the fortified and protected basement) was the finest in "speakeasy" alcohol, slot machines, roulette tables, baccarat and poker tables, along with dancing and entertainment.

== Gambling at the Manitou ==
The Club Manitou, from late June 1929, until Labor Day of 1953, was the northland's finest summer spot for dance-gaming-drinking and nightly musical entertainment. The all-male professional wait staff and chefs were brought to northern Michigan from Club Vatel, New York City. The croupiers were imported from Ballard's Resort in French Lick, Indiana. The wines and liquors were bootlegged in from Windsor, Canada across the Detroit River into Michigan and then trucked north to Harbor Springs. Sometimes the wines and liquors arrived north by boat, via the Great Lakes in speedy motorized boats.

Local authorities looked the other way at the illegal discretions being carried out at the Manitou. It employed several local northern Michigan people and the actual "locals" of the Harbor Springs-Petoskey area were not allowed inside. A strict policy by owner William Al Gerhart of Detroit and Harbor Springs was followed towards local exclusion. The Manitou was strictly for the summer wealthy resorters, and by keeping entrance to the club restricted, the police authorities of the area stayed on the sidelines. Being on the sideline was also reported to be helped by occasional "under the table payments" to the local county sheriff and other legal authorities in the area.

== Clubbing in the Northland ==
The only competition that faced the Purple Gang's manager William Gerhart's (aka "Detroit Slim") for the summer wealthy's attention and money was the Ramona Park Hotel Casino. However, it was soon noticeable to the summer patrons of both places that from the 1929 summer the Ramona Park Casino was old and out-dated. Besides the lack of the Ramona Park Casino's building physical attraction, the Club Manitou's imported French chefs, male professional waiters, and fine wines-crystal each summer from New York City's Club Vatel. The Manitou soon was the top dining and gambling spot in northern Michigan. However, in 1932, the Ramona Park Hotel sold its Ramona Park Casino building to Toledo, Ohio's Gerald "Jimmy" Hayes. Mr. Hayes was a master at providing fine dining and the types of gambling coveted by the wealthy. Beginning in the summer resort season of 1934, the new Ramona Park Casino was strongly competing for the summer resort trade of northern Michigan.

== Gentleman Jimmy Hayes ==
"Jimmy" Hayes was a well known Ohio gaming operator who had visited the Harbor Springs area on various summer vacations and decided he wanted part of the summer wealthy resorter's money. His newly purchased casino was renovated into the Ramona Club Casino in time for the summer season of 1934. The casino lasted longer than "Jimmy Hayes." On October 4, 1934, while in Detroit to reportedly watch a World Series game between the Chicago Cubs and the Detroit Tigers, Hayes body was found in an alley. He had been shot many times at close range. During the next two summer seasons his wife Lenora ran the Ramona Club but decided to sell to Club Manitou's now owner-manager, William "Slim" Gerhart, after the 1936 season. Gerhart tore down the building and used the lumber to help renovate his newly purchased Harbor Springs bar that was located on the waterfront. Gerhart renamed it "Al's Pier Bar" and it existed until sold to become today's Pier Restaurant in 1968.

== Demise of the Manitou ==
The Club Manitou did so well in the late 1930s and early 1940s that owner Gerhart and wife Jeanne decided to triple its size in 1945. The new addition, built to the west of the original 1928 log cabin structure, opened in time for the July 4 – Labor Day summer season of 1946. It was an immediate success. The dining and dancing portions of the nightclub had been moved into the new addition while the illegal gambling activities (such as roulette, poker, baccarat and chuck-a-luck) remained in the steel door-protected basement portion of the old building. By the early 1950s the local authorities were under pressure from the state of Michigan to curb all local gambling in the northern sections the state. After a series of raids by the Michigan State Police, the Michigan Liquor Control Commission decided to remove the club's license to sell alcohol in fall 1953. Without that license, Gerhart decided not to open for the summer 1954 season. The two large structures in rural Harbor Springs, Michigan, stayed dormant until 1962.

== Club Ponytail ==
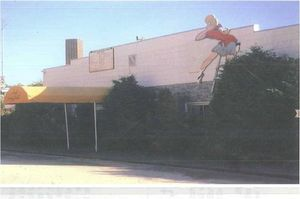
Club Ponytail was a famous upper mid-west teen dance nightclub of Harbor Springs from 1962–1969.

Club Ponytail was a nationally known teen dance club featuring major rock and roll acts of the 1960s. On June 12, 1962, the long-dormant buildings of the former Club Manitou reopened under new owners to become the teen and collegiate nightclub named Club Ponytail.

Unlike its predecessor Club Manitou (1929–1954), liquor and gambling were no longer part of the offerings. However, fine entertainment and dancing was still offered. The Club Ponytail was one of the first of many teen entertainment and dance clubs beginning to operate in the United States during the early 1960s. Dick Clark's American Bandstand helped popularize dancing throughout the country. This new dance craze among teenagers helped spur the development of teen centers such as the Club Ponytail. Its official name was the “Club Ponytail Teen & Collegiate Nite Club.” The house drink was Green River Soda and "Poni's Pizza" was the favorite food offering of the establishment.

=== Stan and Jean Douglas ===
Club owners Stan and Jean Douglas, of Petoskey, Michigan, opened the teen dance center, with the idea of making money, and also providing a safe nightly venue for the area's teens. The large influx of mid-western vacationers to the Petoskey-Harbor Springs area of northern Michigan allowed the booking of major national rock and roll acts. The Douglas family wanted to provide summer resorter and local parents, with a wholesome, safe chaperoned environment for the night time gatherings of their teenagers. In order to draw in the teen crowd, Stan Douglas knew he needed the top names in entertainment for that age group.

=== The Beach Boys-Roy Orbison ===
Northern Michigan's "Tip of the Mitt" area tripled in its size every July and August due to the influx of mid-west city dwellers. They came to their cottages, resort homes and resort hotels to enjoy Lake Michigan’s Little Traverse Bay. Using the Detroit Federation of Musicians as their main booking agent (also used by Detroit's famous Roostertail nightclub), Stan and Jean Douglas were able to bring such popular acts to the Ponytail as the Beach Boys (August 1963), the Supremes, Stevie Wonder, Bobby Vinton, Del Shannon, the Temptations, Smokey Robinson and the Miracles, Marvin Gaye, Bob Seger, Bobby Vee, Martha Reeves and the Vandellas, the Kingsmen ("Louie Louie"), Freddie Cannon, Dee Dee Sharp, the Four Tops, and Roy Orbison.

=== The patio stars ===
An enclosed brick-wall patio with two stages was added in 1965 and the ensuing outside venues drew crowds of 2,500 at a time. In the summer of 1965, Club Ponytail's house band that year was an Ann Arbor group called The Iguanas, featuring Jim Osterberg, who later became known as Iggy Pop. The Animals performed there on August 26, 1966 as well as THEM in August 1968. During the winter season, the Ponytail brought rock and roll stars to northern Michigan during the Christmas season when mid-western skiers flocked to the nearby hills of Boyne Highlands and Nub’s Nob ski resorts.

=== Fire ===
The last band to play the Club Poytail of Harbor Springs was Dean Mann's, The March Brother’s Band, on Sunday March 15, 1969. Two days later, on Tuesday evening March 18, the Ponytail was destroyed by fire. Local firemen theorized that fumes from a gas furnace caused an explosion and the building was immediately engulfed in flame. Though the Douglas family vowed to rebuild the Club Ponytail, it was not to be. The insurance payment for the building was not enough to allow reconstruction. What was left of the dance center was removed. Only the patio and the original Club Manitou building remained.

=== Final year ===
The final acts had already been booked when the building was destroyed. In the summer of 1969, they were performed on the patio and inside the other Douglas-owned nearby establishment, the Golden Horseshoe Supper Club. These acts included the Electric Prunes, the Pleasure Seekers, Mitch Ryder, and the Boyfriends. By the early 1970s, teen clubs were dying out, giving way to large concert venues. The Club Ponytail's demise was soon followed by the opening of (in the nearby summer resort town of Charlevoix, Michigan) Castle Farms “Rock n’ Roll Central” in 1976. Its outside concert facility featured such acts as Metallica, Bon Jovi, Aerosmith, and once again, The Beach Boys.

=== Ponytail Alumni ===
Ponytail Artists [record company]

1962

- The Hi-Notes [Troubadour]
- Belvederes (House band)

1963

- Bobby Vinton [Epic] MAY 3 $2.50 AUG 23
- Corky and the Electras [-]
- Bobby Vee [Capitol] JUL 10, 11 $2
- The Statesmen [RCA Victor]
- The Beach Boys [Capitol] AUGUST 8 $2.50
- Del Shannon [Bigtop Records]
- The Kingtones [Cadet Distributing]
- Brian Hyland [Kapp Records]
- Lou Christie [Buddha]
- Johnny & The Hurricanes [Bigtop Records] JULY 31 and AUGUST 1 $2
- Freddie Cannon [Buddha] AUG 20 $1.50
- Paul & Paula [Phillips Records] DEC 27 1963
- John Tillotson DEC 27, 1963
- The Kasuals DEC 27, 1963

1964

- Roy Orbison [Monument]
- LITTLE IS KNOWN

1965

- The Iguanas (Iggy Pop, Housebad)
- The Four Tops [Motown]
- The Kingsmen [Wand/Scepter] JUL 20 $3
- The Nightwalkers [Inca]
- The Shangri-las [Buddha]
- The Supremes (Dianna Ross) [Motown]
- Dee Dee Sharp [Cameo/Parkway] SEP 2 1965
- Dick & DeeDee [Liberty, Warner Bros]SEP 2 1965

1966

- The Animals [Decca] AUG 26 $4, $5 (at the door)
  - Herman’s Hermits
- The Shillings [-]
- Mitch Ryder and the Detroit Wheels [Stateside] JULY 5 $2.75
- The Beau Brummels [Autumn] JUL 28 $3
- The Chancellors [Path]
- Sam the Sham and the Pharaohs [MGM] AUG 17 $3

1967

- Local bands? Not much known (Golden Horseshoe opens)
- Peter & Gordon [Capitol] AUG 1 $3.50
- The Outsiders AUG 9 $2.50
- The City Limits (house band)
- The Left Banke JUL 19 $2.50
- New Battle of the Bands AUGUST 7 $0.50

1968

- Bob Seger [Capitol] JULY 30 $2.50
- THEM (Van Morrison) [Decca] AUG 6 $2.50
- The Music Explosion [Buddah] JULY 23 $2.50
- The Sand AUG 2 $1.25

1969

- The Amboy Dukes (Ted Nugent) [Epic] July 3 Thur
- The Turtles [White Whale]
- Bobby Goldsboro [United Artists] July 9, 1969
- MC5 [Elektra] JUL 10 $3.50 (Plus the Mother Goose Spearmint Farm)
- Mother Goose Spearmint Farm [-] July 3
- The Electric Prunes (Petoskey News-Review) July 24, 1969
- The Pleasure Seekers [Hideout, Mercury] AUGUST 7 $3
- Unrelated Segments THUR AUG 14 from Toledo (Plus Sea Fever) $2.50
- Sea Fever AUG 14
- The Boy Friends JUL 3
- April Smile July 24, 1969

Unknown dates

- Everybodys Pillows (Credence Clearwater Revival’s band) Sat Aug 16 $2
- The Bottles of Goodness $1.25
- H.P. and “The Grassroot Movement” Sat SEP 27
- Johnny and the Hurricanes SEP 1 & 2 $2
  - The City Limits
- BATTLE OF THE BANDS AUG 13-15 ADMIN $1.50 (likely 64)
- BATTLE OF THE BANDS AUG 18
- Chad and Jeremy [World Artists]
- Conway Twitty [MCA, Elektra]
- The Crystals [Philles]
- Dawn [Bell, Elektra]
- The Guess Who [Scepter]
- Jan & Dean [Liberty]
- The Lloyds of London [-]
- Martha and the Vandellas [Motown]
- Marvin Gaye [Motown]
- The Music Explosion [Buddha]
- Smokey Robinson [Motown]
- Stevie Wonder [Motown]
- The Temptations [Motown]
- Question Mark (?) and The Mysterians
- The Demon Rum
- The City Limits
- Bob Hartman July 24 ?? 63?
- David Mogen and the Grapes of Wrath (houseband) 63??
- The Shillings from University of Arizona JULY 1-5
- The Dirty Shames ? $1.25
- The Wollies AUG 20 $2.50
- The Ones AUG 20 $2.50
- Chubby Checker
- The Jaywalkers
- The Miracles
- The Isley Brothers
- The Four Seasons (Frankie Valli)
- The Dave Clark Five
- Bob Hartman
- Jackie Wilson
- The Other Kind

Celebrity sightings

- Robin Williams (young boy)
- Dustin Hoffman (right before tootsie)
- Janis Joplin (graffiti)
