= Kuehnle's Hotel =

Coordinates: 39.362871°N 74.426759°W

Kuehnle's Hotel was a hotel in Atlantic City, New Jersey first opened on January 9, 1875, by Commodore Louis Kuehnle's father. The Commodore took over the management of the hotel shortly after his eighteenth birthday. Throughout the late 19th and early 20th centuries, Kuehnle's Hotel served as the prime meeting place for some of the time's earliest gangsters, racketeers, politicians, and unscrupulous entrepreneurs. The site is now part of City Center Park.

== Location ==
The Kuehnle Hotel was located at the corner of South Carolina and Atlantic Avenues in Atlantic City, New Jersey. After the building of the Pennsylvania Station Depot, Kuehnle saw much success because of its proximity to the depot, which made many boarders who were arriving and departing choose to stay there.

== History ==
The Corner Bar was the saloon located within the Kuehnle's hotel that served as a hub of Republican politics in Atlantic City and the place that important political decisions were made, which later overturned the old Atlantic City elite.

The Kuehnle's Hotel is credited with influencing some of the greatest political forces during the Prohibition Era such as Harry Bacharach, Isaac Bacharach, and Enoch "Nucky" Johnson. Kuehnle's Hotel served as a place at which Kuehnle and Johnson's father often discussed political ventures and allowed the young Johnson to participate.

In 1903, Kuehnle's Hotel was mistakenly reported as sold to John H. Denny from Johnstown, Pennsylvania for a reported, $300,000 in The New York Times. Kuehnle's father had bought the property not long before for a reported $6,200. Allegedly, Denny had acted as an agent for the Pennsylvania Railroad and bought both Kuehnle's hotel and the adjacent southwest corner of the street for a combined $425,000. The purchase was for an immediate start for construction on a terminal station at the site of Kuehnle's Hotel. The station would also serve as a union for the Pennsylvania and the Reading railroad lines. Both Kuehnle and Denny repeatedly denied claims that the deal had taken place.

In 1919, Kuehnle closed the bar at his hotel. He later sold the property, and the location was razed to make way for a new bank.

The site is now part of City Center Park, a municipal park at South Carolina and Atlantic Avenues.

== Legacy ==
When Commodore Kuehnle died in 1934, City Hall draped his city commissioners chair as well as the building in black and commissioned all firehouses to display their flags at half mast. Kuehnle Avenue is one of the few lasting memories of Kuehnle and the Kuehnle's Hotel. However, his character and the architecture of Atlantic City can be viewed in the HBO series Boardwalk Empire.
