= 1954 Detroit Red Wings prison game =

Outdoor National Hockey League game

| | 1 | 2 | 3 | Total |
|---|---|---|---|---|
| Detroit Red Wings | 18 | — | — | — |
| Marquette Prison Pirates | 0 | — | — | — |
- Date: February 2, 1954
- Venue: Marquette Branch Prison
- City: Marquette, Michigan

The 1954 Detroit Red Wings prison game was an exhibition ice hockey game played on February 2, 1954. The exhibition was played outdoors at the Marquette Branch Prison between the Detroit Red Wings of the National Hockey League (NHL) and a team put together by the inmates of the prison. It was the first ever outdoor game played by the Detroit Red Wings and by any NHL team. After the first period the Red Wings were winning 18–0, and the scores for the remainder of the match were not kept. Newspaper accounts of the game from the Associated Press stated that the final score was 5–2.

The original planning for the game began in June 1953 when the general manager for the Red Wings, Jack Adams, visited the prison while doing a promotional tour for Stroh’s beer. There, the warden asked Adams if the Red Wings would come play the prison. Adams agreed, but only because he never expected the game to ever actually happen. Some say that Adams also agreed as a favor to two inmates he knew, Harry Keywell and Ray Bernstein, who were both members of the notorious Purple Gang.

The Marquette Prison Pirates entered the game with a strong 4–1–1 record against outside teams, under direction of prison athletic director Leonard Brumm. The team was "impressed with the inmates' knowledge of hockey". With equipment donations from the Michigan Tech Huskies and the Marquette Sentinels, the Pirates were able to establish a fully equipped and competitive team.
