= Bugs and Meyer Mob =

Jewish-American street gang on Manhattan's Lower East Side

- Founded: 1920s
- Founded by: Ben Siegel and Meyer Lansky
- Founding location: New York, NY; USA
- Years active: 1920s — 1930s
- Territory: Manhattan
- Ethnicity: Jewish Americans mainly from the Lower East Side
- Criminal activities: Murder, gambling, bootlegging, theft, racketeering, extortion
- Allies: Charles "Lucky" Luciano (boss Genovese crime family), Frank Costello (boss Luciano crime family), Joe Adonis (caporegime Genovese crime family), Enoch L. Johnson (Nucky Johnson's Organization)
- Rivals: Waxey Gordon (boss Gordon crew), Joe Masseria (boss Genovese crime family), Salvatore Maranzano (boss Bonanno crime family)

The Bugs (Bugsy) and Meyer Mob was a Jewish-American street gang in Manhattan, New York City's Lower East Side. It was formed and headed by mobsters Bugsy Siegel and Meyer Lansky during their teenage years shortly after the start of Prohibition. The Bugs and Meyer mob acted as a predecessor to Murder, Inc.

== Origins ==
Lansky and his friends organized a protective society in order to defend against the Italian and Irish gangs. Lansky and his younger brother Jacob, were joined by Meyer "Mike" Wassell, Samuel "Red" Levine, Irving "Tabbo" Sandler, Joseph "Doc" Stacher, and several others.

Some accounts are varied about Lansky meeting Siegel: one account claims that Lansky met Siegel and Charles Luciano the same day when Lansky intervened in an altercation between Siegel and Luciano over a prostitute that Luciano was pandering. However, this story has not been corroborated in Lansky's authorized biographies.

According to Lansky, Siegel and Lansky met on the street corner in the poverty-stricken Lower East Side of Manhattan when they were both teenagers. Returning home from school one day, Lansky witnessed a street craps game break out into a fight when police whistles were heard. As the law drew near, Lansky forced Siegel to drop a gun that Siegel was trying to brandish. Siegel was angered with Lansky about losing the gun. Despite the confrontation, Siegel and Lansky became close friends.

In the outfit, Lansky was considered the "brains", while Siegel was the "brawn". Siegel, the youngest of the gang, was known around his neighborhood as chaye; a Yiddish word meaning "untamed" or "animal". He had a reputation for having a short temper and people described him as being "crazier than a bedbug," which gave him the nickname "Bugsy" that he came to hate.

== Formation ==
Lansky and Siegel soon formed a gang called the Bugs and Meyer mob. In the early 1920s, the Bugs and Meyer mob was in operation, working with Charles "Lucky" Luciano and Luciano's right-hand man Frank Costello. Lansky and Siegel recruited expert gunmen; they supplied bootleggers with stolen trucks and drivers. Lansky was experienced with automobiles and mechanics and soon the Bugs and Meyer mob was active in car theft. At this time they were joined by Abner "Longie" Zwillman and his brother, Irving, Moe Sedway, and Louis "Lepke" Buchalter. The gang handled protection, truck hijacking, murder, and illegal gambling. They were also enforcers of Costello in both New York and Louisiana. They were ultimately responsible for helping to destroy or subordinate by assassination and political bribery most of the Italian-American gangs.

=== Organization ===
The gang grew a violent reputation as they would extort money from Jewish moneylenders and storekeepers, as well as Irish and Italian shop owners and gamblers. The Bugs and Meyer mob fronted illegal operations by owning a car and truck rental garage that served as a warehouse for stolen goods. Lansky and Siegel, being longtime associates of Luciano, would frequently employ the gang to work with Joe Adonis's Broadway Mob throughout the 1920s.

During this period, the New York City Police Department recalled the gang being "vicious". One veteran New York detective described Siegel as "seem[ing] to like to do the job himself. [...] He got his kicks out of seeing his victims suffering, groaning, and dying".

During the Castellammarese War, Lansky and Siegel helped Luciano eliminate the "Mustache Petes" and organize the modern American Mafia. Bugsy Siegel (along with Joe Adonis, Albert Anastasia, and Vito Genovese) was reputedly one of the hitmen that shot and killed Joe Masseria on April 15, 1931. Lansky also assisted Luciano with the murder of Salvatore Maranzano by recruiting Jewish hitmen that included Siegel, Red Levine, and Abraham "Bo" Weinberg. On September 10, 1931, Maranzano was shot and stabbed to death in his Manhattan office.

When Lansky and Luciano formed the National Crime Syndicate in the early 1930s, Lansky, along with Siegel, pushed for a special outfit to handle "enforcement," or murders for the entire syndicate. This outfit was later named Murder, Inc. by the press. Several members of the Bugs and Meyer mob served as advisers or hitmen for Murder, Inc. when it was later headed by Lepke Buchalter and Albert Anastasia.
