= Raccoon coat =

1920s fad among U.S. male college students

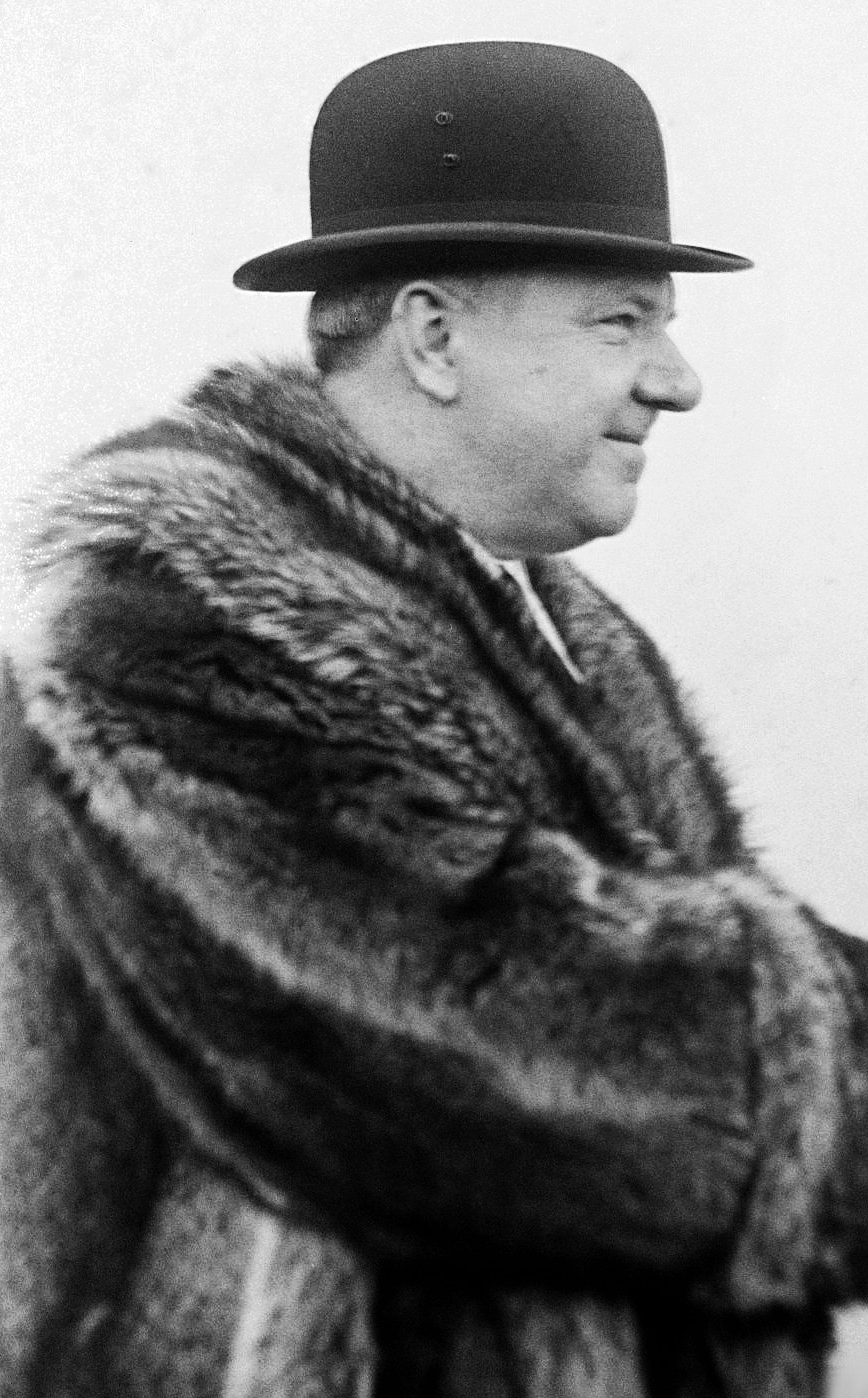
W. C. Fields in a raccoon coat with a bowler hat (likely 1930s).

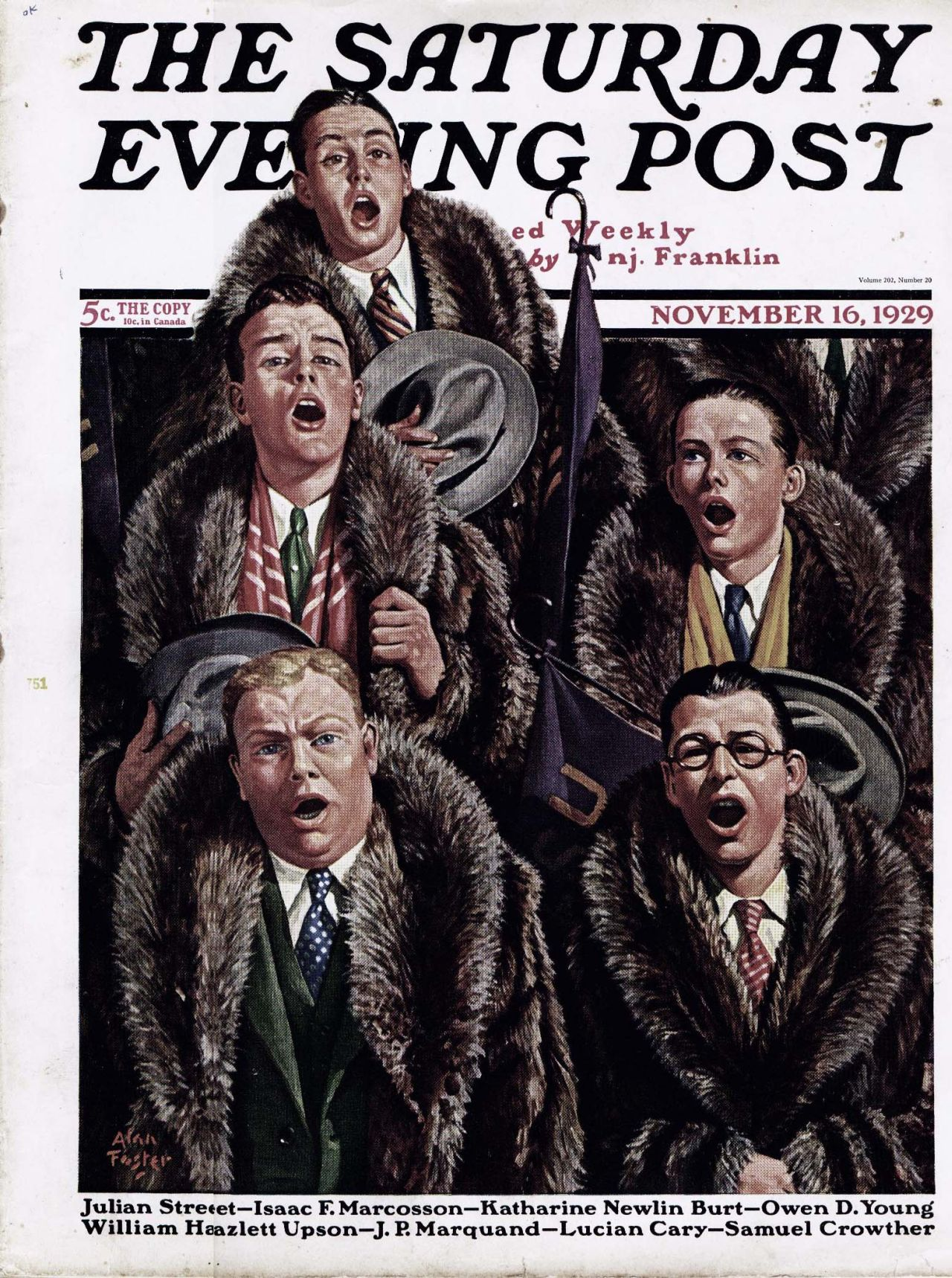
The Saturday Evening Post, November 16, 1929

"Doin' the Raccoon"
Sample of the song which captured the fad at its height, recorded by George Olsen & His Music in 1928

A raccoon coat is a full-length fur coat made of raccoon pelts, which became a fashion fad in the United States during the 1920s. Such coats were particularly popular with male college students in the middle and later years of the decade.

Many automobiles in the 1920s still had open tops or were made of wood and canvas, and had poor heaters or no heaters at all, and the speed of these automobiles was increasing where winter drives without heat became very uncomfortable. Purportedly fur coats became popular due to this, and due to the stories of Davy Crockett and popular artist James Van Der Zee. George Olsen and His Music released a recording highlighting the fad in 1928, titled "Doin' the Raccoon", with the lyrics:

From every college campus comes the cheer: oy-yoy!
The season for the raccoon coat is here, my boy!
Rough guys, tough guys, men of dignity,
Join the raccoon coat fraternity, soon,
To do the raccoon!

A few months after Olsen's recording hit the air, the November 16, 1929, issue of The Saturday Evening Post featured an Alan Foster illustration of several college men wearing raccoon coats. The raccoon coat (many times accompanied with a straw boater, wingtip spectator oxfords, and either a saxophone or a ukulele) has been referenced numerous times in movies and television, both as a symbol of the Jazz Age and as a cliché motif of collegiate enthusiasm.

The fad saw a resurgence during the mid-1950s, specifically vintage coats from the 1920s.
