= Ritz-Carlton Atlantic City =

Condominium in Atlantic City, New Jersey

The Ritz Condominiums
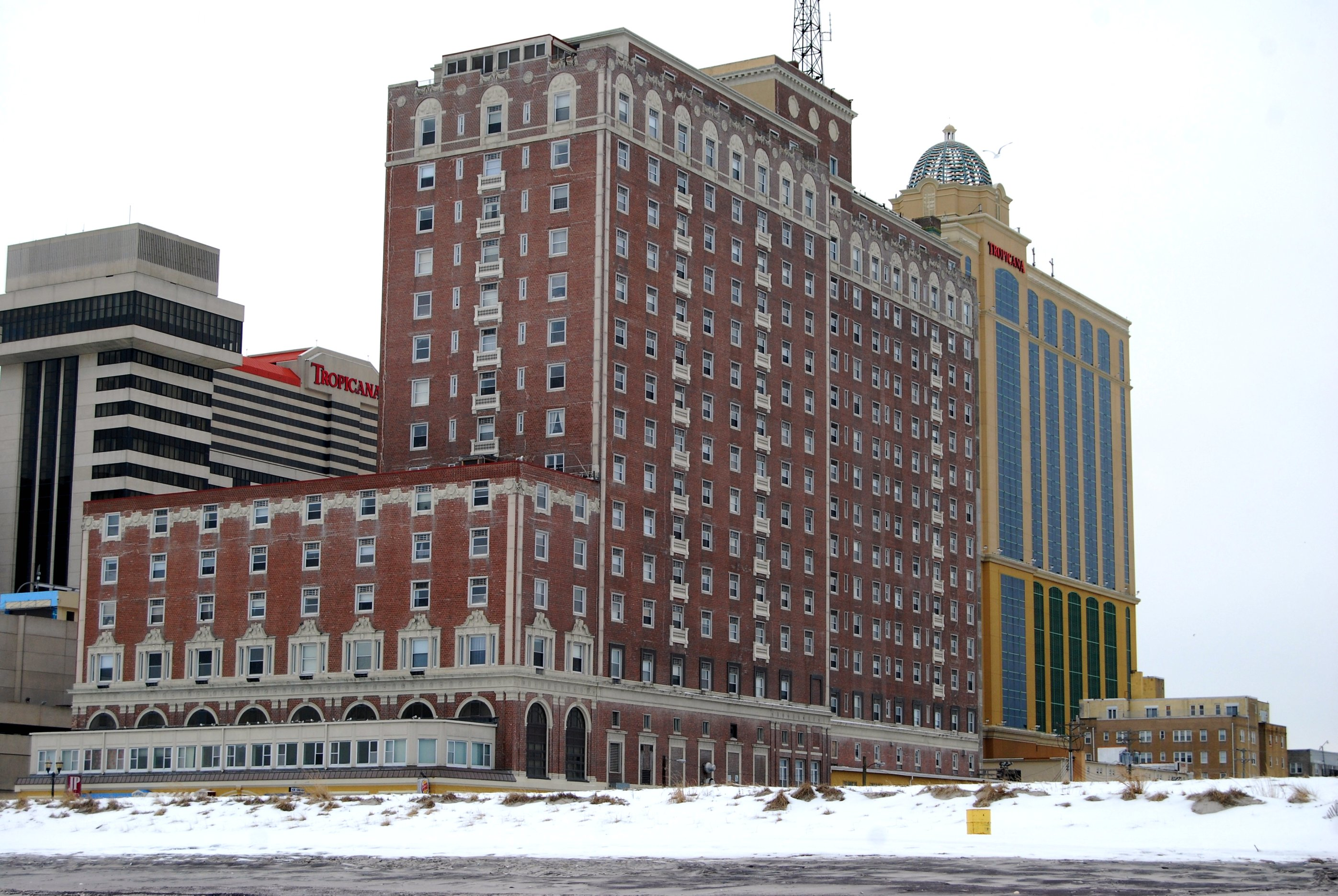
- The Ritz Condominiums from the beach, February 2010
- Interactive map of the The Ritz Condominiums area

General information
- Type: Hotel (former); Condominiums (current)
- Location: Atlantic City, New Jersey
- Coordinates: 39.3526883°N 74.4435793°W
- Construction started: 1919
- Completed: 1921
- Cost: $6.25 million (original)

Height
- Roof: 222 ft (68 m)

Technical details
- Floor count: 18

Design and construction
- Architect: Charles D. Wetmore
- Main contractor: Thompson-Starrett Company

The Ritz-Carlton Atlantic City, located at 199 S. Iowa Avenue in Atlantic City, New Jersey, began as a hotel on the Boardwalk in Atlantic City, built at the beginning of the Roaring Twenties and renowned for its luxurious decor and famous guests. It was used as an apartment hotel beginning in 1969, and then purchased in 1978 with the intention of developing it as a hotel and casino. The building was converted to The Ritz Condominiums in 1982.

== History ==
=== Construction and design ===
The Ritz-Carlton Hotel Company announced its intention to build a hotel in Atlantic City in 1911. The Ritz-Carlton was designed by New York architect Charles D. Wetmore and constructed by the Thompson-Starrett Company. Opened on June 21, 1921, it was erected at a cost of $6.25 million (almost $70 million in 2010 dollars), less than the original $8 million projected. Located at the end of Iowa Avenue, the building has 131 feet of Boardwalk frontage, is 222 ft (68 m) tall, and has 18 stories.

At the building's dedication, hotel president Richard Harris stated "We are out to do business with the average American citizen without regard to race, religion or politics". But the Ritz-Carlton soon became a haunt for the well-off, the hotel exuding wealth and status. Many features were state-of-the-art or unique among hotels at the time. They included fresh- and salt-water faucets for both hot and cold water in each room, an on-site artesian well for spring water, pantries on each landing to speed room service, and elevators with walls of rubber and floors of cork so that bathers could bypass the lobby.

The hotel's restaurants were the Ritz, the Trellis Room, and the Ritz Grill, an outdoor dining terrace overlooking the ocean, and a merry-go-round-shaped bar. The Maude Earl Room, a writing room adjoining the parlor, housed rare and antique art.

=== Barracks, Sheraton, planned casino, conversion ===
During the Depression in 1937 the owners defaulted on the mortgage and the Ritz-Carlton was reorganized under bankruptcy. The hotel was one of many in the city to be used as military barracks for soldiers in training and recuperation during World War II.

After the war, the Ritz-Carlton reopened and was bought by J. Myer Schine in 1946 for $2.25 million. On July 5, 1952, Schine Hotels sold the Ritz-Carlton for $3.75 million to Harry L. Katz and Edward Margolin, owners of the nearby Ambassador Hotel. Sheraton Hotels bought the property on January 16, 1958 for $4 million, briefly renaming it The Sheraton Ritz-Carlton. Sheraton spent a further $800,000 on renovations, but sold the hotel again after only thirteen months, on February 18, 1959, to The Ritz of Atlantic City Corp. for the same price they paid for it.

The Ritz-Carlton was converted to an apartment hotel in June 1969. In 1978, an investor group purchased the building intending to convert it to a hotel and casino. However, unfavorable publicity linking it to the Abscam investigation ended that plan. Senator Harrison A. Williams (D-N.J.) told an undercover FBI agent that he could help save the investors $30 million by allowing them to renovate the existing property, rather than building a new one. Williams' wife was a paid consultant and shareholder in Hardwicke Companies, the majority investor in the project, and Williams expected to receive a $1 million finder's fee for helping arrange financing for the project. Williams was later convicted on unrelated charges.

In 1982, approximately $25 million was spent converting it to 322 residences and six commercial suites, of which some are full-time residences and others are vacation homes. At the same time, the newly re-established Ritz-Carlton Hotel Company paid the building's owners to abandon use of the Ritz-Carlton name, to avoid confusion with their hotels. The building has operated since then as The Ritz Condominiums.

=== Nucky Thompson and the Boardwalk Empire ===
In the HBO original series Boardwalk Empire, the character of Enoch "Nucky" Thompson, the treasurer of Atlantic County, occupies the entire 8th floor of a fictionalized version of the Ritz-Carlton, based on the Marlborough-Blenheim Hotel also on the Boardwalk. The real Enoch "Nucky" Johnson, on whom the character is based, dominated Atlantic City during Prohibition and the Depression, occupied the suites from which he conducted his daily business until his arrest in 1941 on charges of tax evasion. He hosted the historic summit of leaders of organized crime, the Atlantic City Conference, in 1929 at the Ritz and Ambassador. Tours of the building have been organized in response to the popularity of the series. A former bellhop at the hotel, James Boyd was Johnson's top enforcer since the late 1920s and was the inspiration for the Boardwalk Empire character Jimmy Darmody.

=== Historic status ===
In February 2011, New Jersey's State Historic Preservation Office awarded the building a certificate of eligibility, qualifying for listing on the state and federal registers of historic places.

== Notable events, guests and performers ==
In January 1922, President Warren G. Harding addressed guests in an early use of wireless radiophone. The same year, the Ritz Carlton company offered air passage between its hotels in Atlantic City and New York City.

Renowned guests included performers Eddie Cantor, Sophie Tucker, and Lawrence Tibbett; author Bruce Barton; U.S. Presidents Calvin Coolidge, Warren G. Harding, and Herbert Hoover; 1920s to '30s Mayor of New York Jimmy Walker; and mobsters Al Capone and Lucky Luciano.

Among the celebrities who performed at the hotel during its heyday were Paul Whiteman, Bing Crosby, Red Nichols, and Milton Berle.

== See also ==
- Ritz Fizz
- List of tallest buildings in Atlantic City

Preceded by Traymore Hotel	Tallest Building in Atlantic City; 1921—1929; 222 ft	Succeeded by Haddon Hall Hotel
