= Atlantic County Sheriff's Office =

- Abbreviation: ACSO

Agency overview
- Formed: 1837

Jurisdictional structure
- Operations jurisdiction: Atlantic County, New Jersey, United States
- Area: 671 sq mi (1,738 km²)
- Population: 269,918
- Legal jurisdiction: Atlantic County, New Jersey
- General nature: Local civilian police

Operational structure
- Headquarters: Mays Landing, New Jersey
- Sheriff's Officers: 105
- Civilians: 35
- Agency executive: Sheriff Joe O'Donoghue, Sheriff

Facilities
- Courthouses: 2: Atlantic City (Civil / Family); Mays Landing (Criminal)

Website
- www.acsheriff.org

The Atlantic County Sheriff’s Office is a law enforcement agency located in Atlantic County, New Jersey, with countywide jurisdiction as mandated by the State Constitution of New Jersey. The Sheriff is responsible for providing a variety of functions associated with the judicial process and enforcement of law. The head of the organization is Sheriff Joe O'Donoghue.

== History ==
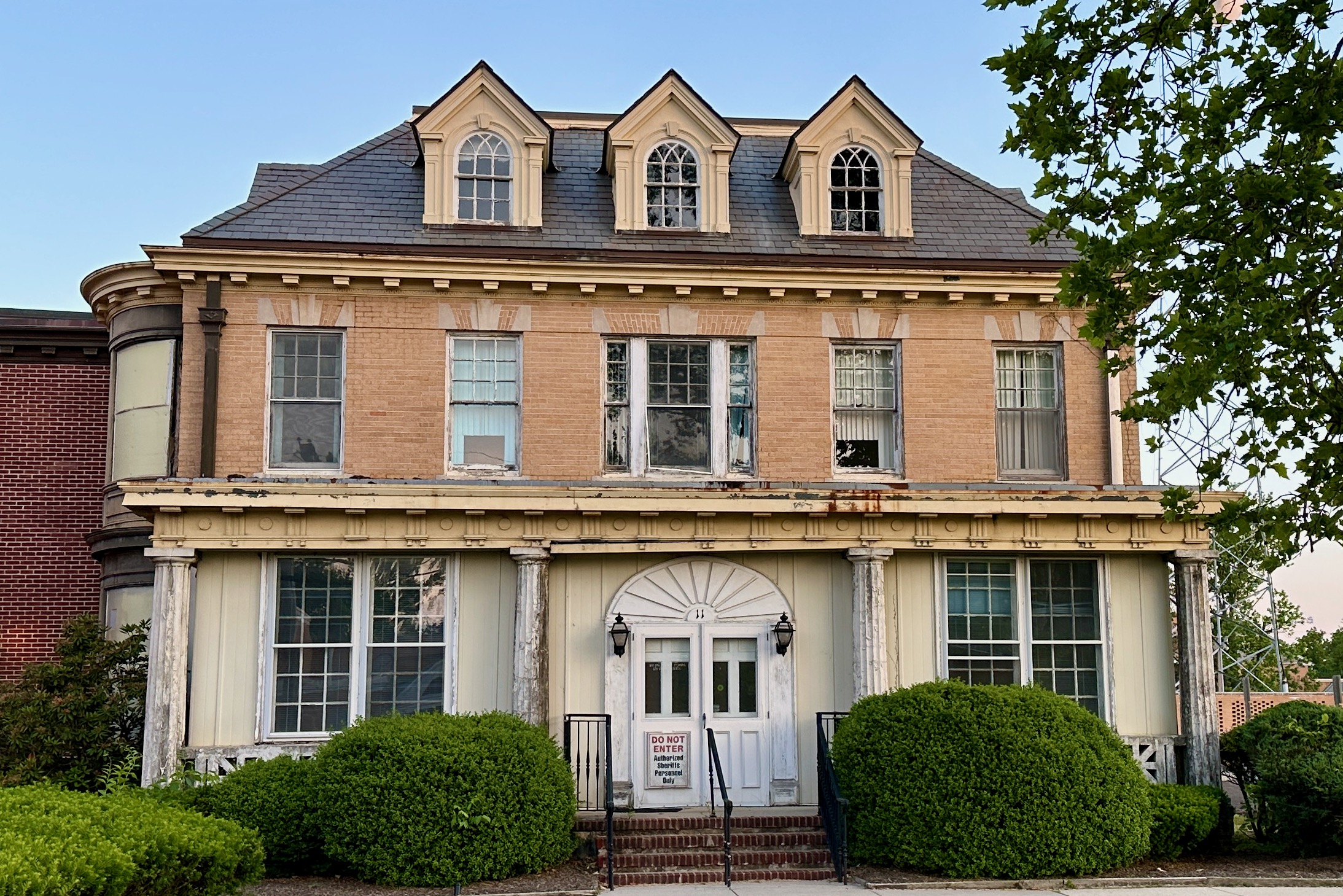
Former Atlantic County Sheriff's House in Mays Landing, built c. 1910

Atlantic County was formed out of parts of Gloucester County on February 7, 1837. The first Board of Chosen Freeholders was established that same year, and decided on Mays Landing as the location for the county seat. Governor Philemon Dickerson appointed Isaac Smith as the first Sheriff of Atlantic County. Sheriff Isaac Smith served as an appointed official until he was duly elected in the fall of 1837. At the time a sheriff's term in office was only one year. Sheriff Smith served three one-year terms. The sheriff's term in office was eventually changed to three years, but consecutive terms were not allowed until a constitutional change in 1947.

This first county jail was located on River Road in Mays Landing on the property of Captain John Pennington. Until a permanent building was constructed, court was held at Pennington’s Inn. In 1838 the first courthouse was built on Main Street in Mays Landing where the building remains today; although, it now serves as office space for the County Clerk, County Surrogate, as well as the Joint Municipal Court of Atlantic County. The original building was only 40’ x 40’, and now consists of Courtroom #2. The permanent jail was constructed in 1840. The building was designed by well-known Philadelphia architect Thomas Ustick Walter. Throughout the years new jails were built to keep up with the growing inmate population. Larger facilities were built in 1932 and 1962. In 1985 the current Atlantic County Justice Facility was opened. A few years later, in 1987, the jail operations split from the sheriff’s office and the Department of Public Safety was created.

In the early days of the sheriff’s office, at least three executions were conducted by the sheriff. These executions were conducted at the "hanging tree" on Main Street in Mays Landing at the site of the old courthouse. The last was conducted September 20, 1907, when Joseph Labriola was hung for murder by Sheriff Smith E. Johnson.

Sheriff Smith E. Johnson served as Sheriff until 1908, when he was succeeded by his undersheriff, and son, Enoch "Nucky" Johnson. Sheriff Enoch Johnson served in the position until he was ousted by a court order in 1911. Nucky Johnson went on to become a well-known political boss and racketeer. Nucky has been fictionalized as the main character in the HBO television series Boardwalk Empire.

== Notable people ==
Employees or people otherwise closely associated with the Atlantic County Sheriff's Office include:

- Enoch "Nucky" Johnson (1883-1968), Served as Sheriff and Undersheriff. Nucky was a well-known political boss and racketeer. Johnson was the inspiration for the character Nucky Thompson on the HBO series "Boardwalk Empire".
- Art Dorrington (1930-2017), Sheriff's Officer who was a former NHL player with the New York Rangers.

== See also ==
- List of law enforcement agencies in New Jersey
