= Harry Keywell =

American gangster (1910–1997)

Harry Keywell (December 8, 1910 – August 30, 1997) was a convicted member of the infamous Purple Gang, that terrorized Detroit, US during Prohibition. Chicago Police questioned him about the infamous St. Valentine's Day Massacre in February 1929, on the suspicion that Keywell acted as a lookout for the killers, however Harry had a cast-iron alibi for the day.

He was arrested for involvement in the Collingwood Manor Massacre on September 16, 1931, convicted, and sentenced to life in prison at Marquette, Michigan. He was paroled on October 21, 1965, aged 54. He had a spotless prison record for 34 years before his life sentence was commuted. Because of the involvement of his brother, Phil Keywell, he was released early for good behavior. During his time in prison, Keywell was allegedly connected to Detroit Red Wings owner Jack Adams and was one of the driving forces behind the 1954 Detroit Red Wings prison game, the first outdoor game featuring an NHL team in recorded league history.

Harry married Sarah Keywell (née Gold), and lived out his days as a productive member of society and family man, until his death of Alzheimer's disease in August 1997.
