= Enoch L. Johnson =

American political boss and mobster (1883–1968)

Enoch Lewis Johnson
- Johnson c. 1923

Treasurer of Atlantic County
- In office January 8, 1913 – August 11, 1941
- Preceded by: Levi C. Albertson
- Succeeded by: Walter S. Jeffries

Sheriff of Atlantic County
- In office November 10, 1908 – November 15, 1911
- Preceded by: Smith E. Johnson
- Succeeded by: Robert H. Ingersoll

Personal details
- Born: January 20, 1883 Galloway Township, New Jersey, U.S.
- Died: December 9, 1968 (aged 85) Northfield, New Jersey, U.S.
- Party: Republican
- Spouses: Mabel Jeffries (m. 1906; died 1912) Florence Osbeck (m. 1941)
- Criminal information
- Organization: Nucky Johnson's Organization
- Conviction: Tax evasion
- Penalty: 10 years imprisonment, fined $20,000

Enoch Lewis "Nucky" Johnson (January 20, 1883 - December 9, 1968) was an American politician from the Republican Party who served as an Atlantic City political boss, sheriff of Atlantic County, businessman, and crime boss who was the leader of the political machine that controlled Atlantic City and the Atlantic County government from the 1910s until his conviction and imprisonment in 1941. His rule encompassed the Roaring Twenties when Atlantic City was at the height of its popularity as a refuge from Prohibition. In addition to bootlegging, the criminal aspect of his organization was also involved in gambling and prostitution. The HBO series Boardwalk Empire was loosely based on Johnson, portrayed by Steve Buscemi as Nucky Thompson.

== Early life ==
Johnson as the Republican nominee for Atlantic County Sheriff, 1908

Enoch Lewis Johnson was born on January 20, 1883, in Galloway Township, New Jersey, to Smith E. and Virginia (Higbee) Johnson, who were Protestants and members of two of Atlantic County's oldest families. His nickname "Nucky" was derived from his given name Enoch.

In 1886, Johnson's father was elected Sheriff of Atlantic County, New Jersey for a three-year term, and the family moved to Mays Landing, the county seat. His career in law enforcement alternated between the roles of sheriff of Mays Landing and undersheriff of Atlantic City. Along with Atlantic County Clerk Lewis P. Scott (1854-1907) and Congressman John J. Gardner, the elder Johnson was a member of the three-man group dominating the governments of Atlantic City and Atlantic County prior to the rise to power of Louis Kuehnle. In 1905, Nucky Johnson became his father's undersheriff in Mays Landing. In 1908, he was elected Sheriff of Atlantic County when his father's term expired, a position he held until ousted by a court order in 1911.

In 1906, Johnson married his teenage sweetheart, Mabel Jeffries, of Mays Landing.

Johnson and Mabel soon enrolled at New Jersey State Normal School (now the College of New Jersey) in Trenton, New Jersey, where he studied English literature. However, he later abandoned his studies in favor of his political career.

== Rise to power ==
In 1909, Johnson was appointed to the politically important position of Atlantic County Republican Executive committee secretary. In 1911, local political boss Louis Kuehnle, Johnson and several others were charged with corruption. Kuehnle was convicted and imprisoned, while Johnson was acquitted, allowing him to succeed Kuehnle as leader of the same organization, which effectively controlled the Republican-led Atlantic City and Atlantic County governments.

Atlantic City was a tourist destination, and city leaders knew that its success as a resort depended on providing visitors with what they wanted. What many tourists wanted was the opportunity to drink, gamble, and visit prostitutes. City leaders realized that permitting a vice industry would give the city an edge over its competitors. Therefore, the organization inherited by Johnson permitted the service of alcohol on Sundays (which at the time was prohibited by New Jersey law), gambling, and prostitution, in exchange for the payment of protection money by vice industry operators to the organization. Support of the vice industry was to continue and expand under Nucky Johnson's rule, as would other forms of corruption, such as kickbacks on government contracts.

In 1912, Johnson's wife Mabel died. Reportedly, Johnson had previously been a teetotaler but began to drink after her death.

Johnson held many jobs during his 30-year rule: County treasurer, which allowed him to control the county's purse strings; county collector; publisher of a weekly newspaper; bank director; president of a building and loan company; and director of a Philadelphia brewery. He declined requests that he run for the state senate, believing that it was beneath the dignity of a "real boss" to stand for election. As the most powerful New Jersey Republican, Johnson was responsible for electing several governors and United States senators.

In 1916 Johnson served as campaign manager for Republican candidate Walter E. Edge's successful run for governor. In addition to raising money for Edge, who was then the state senator from Atlantic County, Johnson engineered Edge's election by reaching out to Democratic Hudson County boss Frank Hague, who disliked the Democratic nominee, Otto Wittpenn. Edge provided Hague with a pledge of cooperation, and Hague instructed people in his Democratic organization to cross over and vote for Edge in the Republican primary. Hague did not support Wittpenn in the general election, and Edge was elected. Edge rewarded Johnson by appointing him clerk of the State Supreme Court.

== Atlantic City during Prohibition ==
Johnson's power reached its peak during Prohibition, which was enacted nationally in 1919 (but did not go into effect until 1920) and lasted until 1933. Prohibition was effectively unenforced in Atlantic City, and, as a result, the resort's popularity grew further. The city then called itself "The World's Playground". This was aided by Johnson who, with his influence and power in the city, made sure that anyone who was serving alcohol, running a brothel, or managing a gambling den wasn't bothered so long as Johnson got a cut of the money. In fact, most of Johnson's income came from the percentage he took on every gallon of illegal liquor sold and on gambling and prostitution operations in Atlantic City. Johnson once said:

We have whiskey, wine, women, song, and slot machines. I won't deny it and I won't apologize for it. If the majority of the people didn't want them they wouldn't be profitable and they would not exist. The fact that they do exist proves to me that the people want them.

Investigators charged that Johnson's income from vice exceeded $500,000 a year (equivalent to over $10 million in 2025). He rode in a chauffeur-driven, $14,000 powder-blue limousine and wore expensive clothes, including a $1,200 raccoon coat. His personal trademark was a red carnation, fresh daily, worn on his lapel. At the height of his power, Johnson lived in a suite of rooms on the ninth floor of the Ritz-Carlton Hotel, located on the Boardwalk. The Ritz, which opened in 1921, was where Johnson hosted many lavish parties. He was known as both "the Czar of the Ritz" and "the Prisoner of the Ritz". He freely gave to those in need, and he was widely beloved by local citizens, among whom his benevolence and generosity were legendary. Johnson once explained, "When I lived well, everybody lived well".

Since its founding, Atlantic City, like other summer resorts, had been burdened with a seasonal economy, and efforts to promote tourism there during the colder months had not been successful. The free availability of alcohol during Prohibition, however, made Atlantic City the nation's premier location for holding conventions. In an effort to promote a year-round convention-supported economy, Johnson directed the construction of Atlantic City Convention Hall. Work on Convention Hall began in 1926 and it opened in May 1929. A 650-by-350-foot (200 by 110 m) structure, it was a state-of-the-art convention building and contained what was then the largest room in history with an unobstructed view.

Under Nucky Johnson, Atlantic City was one of the leading ports for importing bootleg liquor and, in 1927, he agreed to participate in a loose organization of other bootleggers and racketeers along the east coast, forming the Big Seven or Seven Group. He was the host of the Atlantic City Conference in 1929, a meeting of national organized crime leaders, including Al Capone (a well-known photograph purporting to show Johnson and Capone walking down the Boardwalk together during the conference is of doubtful authenticity).

Johnson had a Russian personal assistant and valet, Louis Kessel.

Johnson's top enforcer and powerful Fourth Ward boss was former Ritz-Carlton Hotel bellhop Jimmy Boyd. Johnson met Boyd around the time that Johnson and Charlie Luciano were forming the Big Seven. When they met, Boyd and Johnson took an instant liking to each other, and Johnson began grooming him to become the boss of his organization.

== Tax evasion charges ==
Nucky Johnson's name was mentioned frequently in a series of articles about vice in Atlantic City published in 1930 by William Randolph Hearst's New York Evening Journal. According to some accounts, bad blood existed between Johnson and Hearst because Johnson had become too close to a showgirl who was Hearst's steady date when he visited Atlantic City. Johnson subsequently was the focus of increased scrutiny by the Federal government, allegedly as a result of Hearst's lobbying of Roosevelt administration officials.

In 1933 a property lien was filed against Johnson by the Federal government for additional taxes he owed on income earned in 1927. That year also saw the repeal of Prohibition, which eliminated a major selling point for Atlantic City among tourists and conventioneers, as well as a source of income for Johnson and his political machine. On May 10, 1939, Johnson was indicted for evading taxes on about $125,000 in income he received from numbers operators during 1935, 1936 and 1937. A two-week trial concluded in July 1941, and Johnson was convicted. He was sentenced to ten years in federal prison and fined $20,000. On August 1, 1941, Johnson, then 58 years old, married 33-year-old Swedish American Florence "Flossie" Osbeck, a former showgirl from Philadelphia, to whom he had been engaged for three years. Ten days later, on August 11, 1941, Johnson entered Lewisburg Federal Penitentiary.

Following Johnson's 1941 conviction, Frank S. Farley succeeded him as the leader of Atlantic City's political machine.

== Parole and prison release ==
Johnson was paroled on August 15, 1945, after four years in prison, and took a pauper's oath to avoid paying the $20,000 fine (equivalent to $358,000 in 2025).

After his release from prison, Johnson lived with his wife and brother in a house owned by relatives of his wife on South Elberon Avenue, Atlantic City. There was speculation that he would seek elected office, but he never did. Instead, he worked in sales for the Richfield Oil Company, and, with his wife, for Renault Winery. During these years, Johnson and his wife would sometimes attend local political dinners or rallies, where they would be seated at the head table. He continued to dress impeccably, including a red carnation on his lapel. Johnson steadfastly supported Farley's leadership, and in 1952, when the Farley organization faced a particularly strong election challenge, Johnson campaigned on his behalf in Atlantic City's predominantly black Northside area, where Johnson remained popular.

== Death ==
Enoch Johnson died on December 9, 1968, at the Atlantic County Convalescent Home in Northfield, New Jersey. According to The Press of Atlantic City, Johnson "was born to rule: He had flair, flamboyance, was politically amoral, and ruthless, and had an eidetic memory for faces and names, and a natural gift of command ... [Johnson] had the reputation of being a trencherman, a hard drinker, a Herculean lover, an epicure, a sybaritic fancier of luxuries, and all good things in life".

== In popular culture ==
Boardwalk Empire fictionalized the Prohibition era in Atlantic City. The series ran for five seasons, was produced by Martin Scorsese and Mark Wahlberg and starred Steve Buscemi as Nucky Thompson. Show creator Terence Winter elected to portray a fictionalized version of Johnson, to give the writers creative license with history, and to maintain suspense. One great difference between the real Johnson and the fictional Thompson is that the real Johnson is not known to have killed anyone personally, as the fictional Thompson does; there is also no evidence that Johnson ever ordered someone to be killed. Also, Thompson is portrayed as running his distillery for bootlegging and competing directly with real-life gangsters for distribution on the East Coast, whereas the real Johnson took a cut of all illegal alcohol sold in Atlantic City but was never known to engage in competition or turf wars. He has been described as running his empire "with a velvet hammer". Johnson did not remarry until 1941, long after his wife's death in 1912; in the show, Thompson remarries in 1921. Thompson is Irish Catholic, while Johnson was a Methodist whose parents were from two of Atlantic County's oldest families.

The HBO television series is based on a chapter of the 2002 book Boardwalk Empire: The Birth, High Times, and Corruption of Atlantic City, by Nelson Johnson (no relation).

In Louis Malle's 1980 film Atlantic City, aging gangster Lou (Burt Lancaster) mentions an incident involving Enoch L. Johnson.
