= Abe Bernstein =

American mobster

Abe Bernstein (c. 1892 – March 7, 1968) was a Detroit-based Jewish-American organized crime figure and leader of the infamous Prohibition-era Purple Gang.

== Early life ==
Born in New York City, Abe Bernstein and his brothers Joseph "Bill Bugs", Raymond, and Isadore Bernstein were children of Jewish immigrants from the Russian Empire. They moved as youths with their family to Detroit, which had a growing industrial economy based on automobile manufacturing.

During their teenage years, they joined a juvenile street gang that was the precursor to the adult Purple Gang. By the beginning of Prohibition, Bernstein and his brothers had emerged as leading members of the gang. As the Purple Gang members matured, they quickly gained a reputation along the Detroit waterfront as ruthless and violent hijackers. However, they normally attracted little attention from police during the Prohibition era, as their victims were usually either rumrunners or rival gangs such as the Little Jewish Navy.

== Prohibition era ==
Bernstein and the others soon formed an association with longtime mobsters Charles Leiter and Henry Shorr; by the early 1920s they were working exclusively as enforcers for the latter mobsters. Their open executions of targets on the street terrorized the city.

Bernstein and several other members were later arrested three days after the murder of Detroit policeman Vivian Welsh. The Chevrolet coupe used in his murder was traced to Bernstein's brother Raymond, but Abe was released due to lack of evidence. This decision may have resulted from press reports that alleged the deceased Welsh had been a "dirty cop," extorting money from independent bootleggers and speakeasy operators. Abe Bernstein and other gang members were under continual police surveillance. Several years later, Raymond Bernstein was convicted of first degree murder in a different case.

In March 1928, Bernstein was arrested and charged with conspiracy to extort money from the city's wholesale dry cleaners industry. Arrested and charged with Bernstein were Purple Gang members Raymond Bernstein, Irving Milberg, Eddie Fletcher, Joe Miller, Irving Shapiro, Abe Kaminsky, and brothers Abe and Simon Axler. Police were initially unable to locate Bernstein; he had been attending a mobster Atlantic City Conference with Meyer Lansky and Charles "Lucky" Luciano. After returning to Detroit several days later, Bernstein surrendered to authorities and posted a $500 bail bond. Beginning June 4, 1928, forty-two witnesses testified over a three-month period before Judge Charles Bowles. A jury acquitted all the defendants of all charges.

== Involvement in the St. Valentine's Day Massacre ==
Bernstein, a chief supplier of Canadian whiskey to Chicago Outfit leader Al Capone, is also suspected to have been involved in the St. Valentine's Day Massacre. Bernstein supposedly set up North Side Gang leader George "Bugs" Moran for a murder attempt by Capone by selling him a recently hijacked liquor shipment and delivering it to a North Side warehouse. On February 14, 1929, seven North Side gunmen waiting for the liquor shipment were killed by Capone gunmen at that warehouse. The chief target, Bugs Moran, had never arrived.

== Later years ==
During the mid-1920s, Bernstein began expanding his gang's activities to other major cities in the country. He became an associate of New York mobsters Joe Adonis and Meyer Lansky, and later became a partner in several syndicate gambling casinos in Miami, Florida. He started Club Manitou of Harbor Springs in 1929. After his brother Ray was imprisoned for his part in the Collingwood Manor Massacre, Bernstein devoted the rest of his life in an effort to get his brother released from prison.

Bernstein died March 7, 1968, in his hotel room of the Book-Cadillac, suspected due to a heart attack.

== In popular culture ==
Bernstein was portrayed by Hal Alpert in the 2017 film Gangster Land.
