= Louis Kuehnle =

American businessman and politician

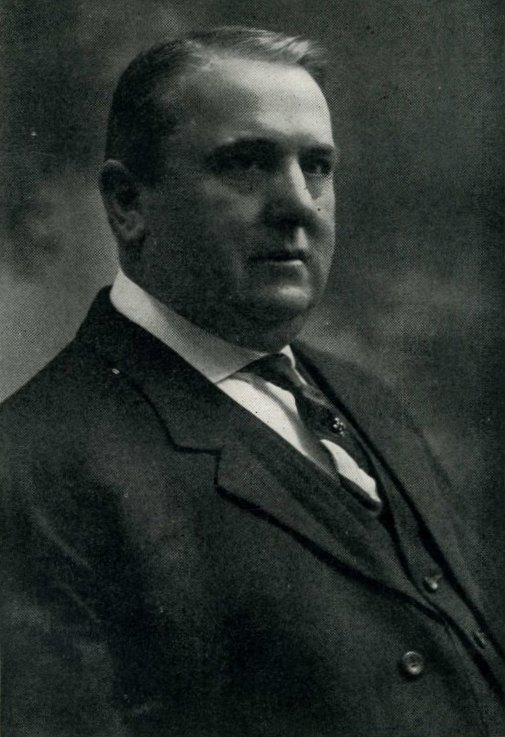
- 1916 Atlantic City Police Department Souvenir Book
- Born: December 25, 1857; New York City, U.S.
- Died: August 6, 1934 (aged 76); Atlantic City, New Jersey, U.S.
- Other name: "The Commodore"
- Occupation: Hotel operator of Kuehnle's Hotel
- Conviction: Conflict of interest
- Penalty: 6 months

Louis Kuehnle, (/ˈkuːnliː/; December 25, 1857 – August 6, 1934), known as "Commodore Kuehnle", was an American businessman and politician of German descent. He is considered a pioneer in the growing resort town of Atlantic City, New Jersey, in the late 1880s and the early 1900s. He was leader of the Republican organization that controlled Atlantic City in the early 1900s.

New Jersey Governor Woodrow Wilson, who later became a US president, pursued Kuehnle after his 1910 election as part of his campaign to clean up Atlantic City. That effort led to the unsuccessful prosecution of Kuehnle for election fraud and the successful prosecution and conviction of him for a conflict of interest in connection with a government contract. Kuehnle then had his name tarnished by scandal, and he was succeeded by Enoch "Nucky" Johnson as leader of the organization.

== Early life ==
Kuehnle was born in New York City on December 25, 1857. The son of German immigrants Louis and Katrina Kuehnle. His father was a successful chef. He attended the Ludwig-Maximilians-Universität München, but did not perform academically and dropped out after a year.

On 1858, Louis Kuehnle Sr. moved his family to Egg Harbor City, New Jersey, where he began his first hotel, The New York Hotel. The family then moved again, in 1875, to nearby Atlantic City to open another hotel, Kuehnle's Hotel.

== Rise to power ==
Louis Sr. died, which left Kuehnle, who was only 18, to take over Kuehnle's Hotel at the corner of South Carolina and Atlantic Avenues. A saloon, "The Corner," was within the hotel and became a popular meeting place for local politicians. The meetings included three Atlantic County power brokers, one of whom was Nucky Johnson's father Sheriff Smith E. Johnson. When one of those three politicians died in 1900, Kuehnle took his spot at the meetings and eventually took control of the club itself.

Nicknamed "Louie," Kuehnle grew both in popularity and political power in Atlantic City and inspired other young politicians such as Harry and Isaac Bacharach and Enoch Johnson. Kuehnle is credited as the architect and first leader of a partisan political machine in Atlantic City and held great control over the city from the late 1800s until his imprisonment in 1911. He responded to critics of his power by saying, "They'll build a monument to me someday; I built this town."

== Community leader ==
Kuehnle was responsible for numerous improvements to the city, as he always remembered his goal of transforming Atlantic City into a major US metropolis. Concerned with high rates for telephone and gas, he created his own telephone and gas companies, resulting in lower prices. His telephone company, the Atlantic Coast Telephone Company, would later be bought by Bell. Kuehnle also helped lower electric prices by supporting a competing utility in the area. He helped build the Boardwalk and even increased the amount of fresh water in town by building a water main from the mainland to Absecon Island. To show its possibility, he drilled an artesian well and created the city's waterworks company. Kuehnle was always an entrepreneur in the transportation industry and helped modernize the trolley system to improve intracity transport.

Kuehnle devised nonviolent ways to get the state militia to visit and to calm the community whenever a Philadelphia newspaper published an inflammatory article. He was well regarded by the African-American community.

Joining the Atlantic City Yacht Club during his prime, he later served as chairman, which is essentially the origin of his adopted unofficial rank of "Commodore." He kept that nickname until his death.

=== Corruption ===
Rackets such as prostitution, gambling, and liquor were available at his hotel. Additionally, he extorted gambling rooms and whorehouses, as well a variety of legitimate businesses, to fund his Republican political operation. Because he saw them as appointees, Kuehle would force government employees to "kick back" 5-7% of their salaries to the Republican Party.

Election fraud was prevalent, with the Republicans paying black voters $2 per vote. The voters would be taken to multiple voting stations and vote in the names of the deceased who were still registered to vote. Kuehnle's Republicans increased their level of fraud in the 1910 gubernatorial election campaign so that their candidate would be elected as governor of New Jersey. Despite their work, they lost. Woodrow Wilson won instead, becoming governor in large part due to his vow to address corruption in Atlantic City.

Wilson, following his promise, investigated corruption by looking into the election results. He noted that there were more than 3,000 Republican votes identified as fraudulent in Atlantic City. Therefore, he elected a commission to prosecute. It received indictments but could not get a conviction of anyone important.

== Legal trouble ==
Kuehnle's projects improved Atlantic City, but at a cost. The Republican Party, which he controlled, gave out city contracts but not necessarily to the lowest-cost bid. Quite often, business contracts were awarded to companies that Kuehnle owned. In 1909, Atlantic City awarded a contract to construct a water main from the mainland. The winning bidder subsequently assigned part of the contract to a company in which Kuehnle was a part owner.

Kuehnle, as the chairman of the city's water commission, later approved contract changes that resulted in increased payments to the company in which he held an ownership interest. Wilson's team finally had a solid case against Kuehnle for conflict of interest.

In 1913, Kuehnle was convicted of conflict of interest related corruption and was sentenced to one year of hard labor and a $1,000 fine. After six months, he traveled to Bermuda for vacation and took an extended trip to Bavaria, Germany, where he had ancestors.

== Return ==
When he returned to Atlantic City, Enoch "Nucky" Johnson had become the unofficial boss of the city. After Kuehnle unsuccessfully challenged Johnson's leadership, Johnson agreed to support Kuehnle, his former mentor, for city commissioner. Kuehnle was elected in 1920 and re-elected every four-year term until his death in 1934. He served specifically as Commissioner of Parks and Public Property. As a commissioner, he proved to be independent and sometimes opposed Johnson's organization.

== Death ==
Kuehnle died on August 6, 1934. He was buried in Egg Harbor City—a place of residence during his teenage years. On the day of his death, City Hall draped his chair in the Commission Chamber and itself in black. Flags hung at half staff on every firehouse. Kuehnle Avenue is the only visible monument dedicated to him in Atlantic City.

== In popular culture ==
- Kuehnle served as the basis for the character Louis "The Commodore" Kaestner, played by Dabney Coleman and John Ellison Conlee in the television series Boardwalk Empire.

== Sources ==
- Johnson, Nelson (2002). Boardwalk Empire: The Birth, High Times, and Corruption of Atlantic City. Medford: Plexus Publishing.
- Paulsson, Martin (1994). The Social Anxieties of Progressive Reform: Atlantic City, 1854-1920. NYU Press. ISBN 9780814766200. JSTOR j.ctt9qfk1g.
- Who's Who in New Jersey Atlantic County Edition. New York: National Biographic News Service. 1925.
