= Purple Gang =

Criminal mob group of the 1920s

The Purple Gang
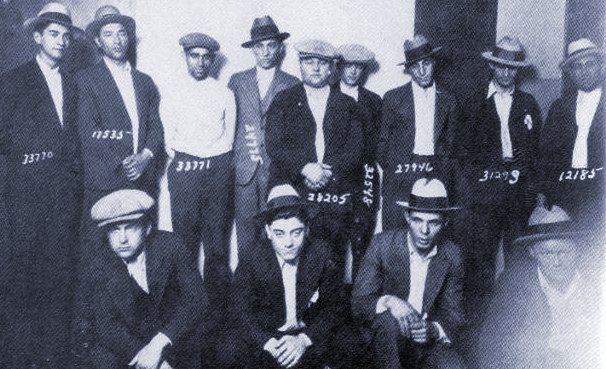
- Founded: 1910s
- Founding location: Detroit / Muskegon, Michigan, United States
- Years active: 1910s–1932
- Territory: Detroit
- Ethnicity: Ashkenazi Jewish
- Activities: Murder, extortion, theft, armed robbery, kidnapping, gambling, bootlegging
- Allies: Chicago Outfit; Fred "Killer" Burke
- Rivals: The Detroit Partnership; Fred "Killer" Burke after 1927

The Purple Gang, also known as the Sugar House Gang, was a criminal mob of bootleggers and hijackers composed predominantly of Jewish gangsters. They operated in Detroit, Michigan, during the 1920s of the Prohibition era and came to be Detroit's dominant criminal gang. Excessive violence and infighting caused the gang to destroy itself in the 1930s.

== History ==
The Michigan Legislature prohibited the sale of liquor in 1917, three years before national Prohibition was established by a constitutional amendment. Along with temperance supporters, industrialist Henry Ford owned the River Rouge plant and desired a sober workforce, so he backed the Damon Act, a state law that, along with the Wiley Act, prohibited virtually all possession, manufacture, or sale of alcohol starting in 1918. Detroit is close to Ohio, so bootleggers and others would import liquor from Toledo where it was still legal. They also smuggled liquor in from Canada.

Judges took a lenient view of offenders. The Damon Act was declared unconstitutional in 1919 by the state supreme court.

In 1920, the Eighteenth Amendment was adopted and prohibition took effect throughout the United States. Canada, particularly the port city of Windsor, Ontario, directly across the Detroit River from Detroit, became a major point for smuggling alcohol products into the US. The Canadian government had also banned the use of alcoholic beverages but still approved and licensed distilleries and breweries to manufacture and export alcohol.

=== Origin ===
Detroit's immigrant neighborhoods suffered from widespread poverty, as did many in major cities at the beginning of the 20th century. To survive, some residents turned to crime, which they enforced with violence. The Hastings Street neighborhood in Detroit's lower east side was known as "Paradise Valley". Most of the Purple Gang's core members went to Bishop School, where many had been placed in the division for "problem" children. The gang members were mostly American-born children of Jewish immigrants, primarily from Russia and Poland, who had come to the United States in the great immigration wave from 1881 to 1914.

The gang was led by brothers Abe, Joe, Raymond, and Izzy Bernstein, who had moved to Detroit from New York City.

While in Detroit, casino operator Lincoln Fitzgerald was a gambler and he became associated with the Detroit Purple Gang.

== Rise ==
The Purple Gang started off as petty thieves and extortionists, but they quickly progressed to armed robbery and truck hijacking under the tutelage of older neighborhood gangsters (Charles Leiter and Henry Shorr). They gained notoriety for their operations and savagery, and they imported gangsters from other cities to work as "muscle" for the gang.

There are various theories as to the origin of the name "Purple Gang". One version says that a member of the gang was a boxer who wore purple shorts during his bouts. Another was that the name came from a conversation between two shop keepers:

These boys are not like other children of their age, they're tainted, off color.
"Yes," replied the other shopkeeper. "They're rotten, purple like the color of bad meat, they're a Purple Gang."

It was known that in 1929, there were 25,000 illegal saloons in the Detroit city, so there was a large business for bootleggers, including the Purple Gang. The gang became hijackers and gained a reputation for stealing the alcohol cargos of older and more established criminal gangs. The Purple Gang also employed gangs for raw labor and transport; for example, the Purple Gang enlisted “The Little Jewish Navy” to carry alcohol over the Detroit River from Canada before selling it themselves. Chicago gangster Al Capone was against expanding his rackets in Detroit, so he began a business accommodation with the Purple Gang in order to prevent a bloody war. For several years, the gang managed the prosperous business of supplying Canadian whisky to the Capone organization in Chicago. The Purple Gang was involved in various other criminal actions, such as kidnapping other gangsters for ransom, which became very popular during this era. The FBI suspected that they were involved with the Lindbergh baby kidnapping.

By the late 1920s, the Purple Gang reigned supreme over the Detroit underworld, controlling the city's vice, gambling, liquor, and drug trade. They also ran the local wire service, providing horse racing information to local horse betting parlors. The gang members consorted with more infamous mobsters, branching into other cities, as well. Abe Bernstein was a friend of Meyer Lansky and Joe Adonis, with whom he owned several Miami, Florida gambling casinos in his later years. The gang hijacked prizefight films and forced movie theaters to show them for a high fee. They also defrauded insurance companies by staging fake accidents. Altogether, the Purple Gang is alleged to have been responsible for 500 murders in the city.

=== Cleaners and Dyers War ===
As the gang grew in size and influence, they began hiring themselves out as hitmen and took part in the Cleaners and Dyers war. The Purples profited from the Detroit laundry industry unions and associations. They were hired out to keep union members in line and to harass non-union independents. Bombing, arson, theft, and murder were the usual tactics that the gang employed to enforce union policy.

Abe Axler and Eddie Fletcher were reputedly imported from New York City to take part in the scheme (although other sources put their origins in Detroit). In 1927, nine members of the Purple Gang (Abe Bernstein, Raymond Bernstein, Irving Milberg, Eddie Fletcher, Joe Miller, Irving Shapiro, Abe Kaminsty, Abe Axler, and Simon Axler) were arrested and charged with conspiracy to extort money from Detroit wholesale cleaners and dyers. They were eventually acquitted of all charges.

Harry Rosman (1891–1958) was president and owner of Famous Cleaners & Dyers in Detroit, Michigan. He gained public notoriety for being the key witness testifying against the Purple Gang in a trial that lasted from 1928 to 1929. The prosecution alleged extortion activities against Detroit area businesses during the sometime violent showdown known as the Cleaners & Dyers Wars. Rosman testified that the Purple Gang asked for $1000 per week from his and other area cleaners & dyers' businesses for their "protection" against violence.

=== Milaflores Massacre ===
A Detroit Mob War soon ensued between the Italian, Irish, and Jewish bootleggers over territory. The Purples fought a vicious turf war with the Licavoli Squad led by the brothers Tommy and Pete Licavoli. In March 1927, three men were killed. The deceased men had been brought into Detroit as hired assassins for the Purple Gang and the motive for the murder was believed to be retaliation for a "double cross". The homicides took place in an apartment leased by Purple Gang members Eddie Fletcher and Abe Axler (and reportedly Fred Burke, an associate of the Purples originally connected to the Egan's Rats gang of St. Louis), which made them prime suspects in the slaying. The three suspects (Fletcher, Axler, and Burke) were questioned, as were the other Purples and associates. No one was ever convicted of the murders. These murders were reportedly the first use of a submachine gun in a Detroit underworld slaying.

=== St. Valentine's Day Massacre ===
The Purple Gang was suspected of taking part in the St. Valentine's Day Massacre in Chicago. On February 13, 1929, Abe Bernstein reputedly called Bugs Moran to tell him that a hijacked load of booze was on its way to Chicago. Moran, who was in the middle of a turf war with Capone, had only recently begun to trust Bernstein, who had previously been Capone's chief supplier of Canadian liquor. The next day, instead of delivering a load of liquor, four men, two in police uniforms, went to S.M.C. Cartage on North Clark Street (Moran's North Side hangout) and opened fire with Thompson submachine guns, killing seven men in what has become known as the St. Valentine's Day Massacre. Several witnesses and some items of physical evidence implicated Burke in the slayings; he was never charged.

=== Collingwood Manor Massacre ===
The Purple Gang began terrorizing Detroiters with the street executions of their enemies. Among their victims was city police officer Vivian Welsh, killed on February 1, 1927; he was later revealed to be a dirty cop who was reputedly trying to extort money from the Purple Gang. In 1930 the gang was accused of murdering Jerry Buckley, a well-known radio figure, in the lobby of a downtown hotel. Whether the Purples were involved with Buckley's death is disputed, as the police suspected the local Sicilian mob. No one was charged in either case, and both of the murders remain officially unsolved.

In 1931, an intra-gang dispute ended in the murder of three Purples by Chicago gangsters who had been imported to Detroit to help out the Purple Gang. The three men had violated an underworld code by operating outside the territory allotted to them by the Purple Gang leadership. Herman "Hymie" Paul, Isadore Sutker a.k.a. "Joe Sutker", and Joseph "Nigger Joe" Lebowitz were lured to an apartment on Collingwood Avenue on September 16, 1931. They believed they were going to a peace conference with the Purple leaders. After a brief discussion, the three men were gunned down. Authorities caught up with the gang when they burst into Fletcher's apartment and found the suspects (Abe Axler, Irving Milberg, and Eddie Fletcher) playing cards. Ray Bernstein and Harry Keywell were also arrested.

=== Aftermath ===
Irving Milberg, Harry Keywell, and Raymond Bernstein, three high-ranking Purples, were convicted of first-degree murder in the Collingwood Manor Massacre and were sentenced to life in prison. Bernstein, Milberg, and Keywell were accompanied by police officers on a special Pullman train bound for Michigan's Upper Peninsula to begin serving their sentences in the state's maximum security prison in Marquette, Michigan. Harry Fleisher, another suspect, remained on the run until 1932, but he was never convicted in connection with the massacre. Later on, he served time in Jackson Prison, the world's largest walled prison, in the early 1950s for armed robbery of an Oakland County gambling house. According to Detroit Police Chief of Detectives, James E. McCarty, the convictions in the Collingwood Massacre "broke the back of the once powerful Purple Gang, writing finis to more than five years of arrogance and terrorism".

== Downfall ==
For many years, the Purples enjoyed immunity from police interference as witnesses to crimes were terrified of testifying against any criminal identified as a Purple gangster. The Purple Gang reputedly became more arrogant and sloppy as time progressed. They dressed flamboyantly, frequented the city's night spots, and were well known to the public. They lived in fine houses and soon a romantic aura surrounded the Purples that distinguished them from the other gangs in Detroit. Jealousies, egos, and intra-gang quarrels would eventually cause the Purple Gang to collapse. The police eventually moved against them as gang members began leaving behind too much evidence of their crimes.

Phillip Keywell had already been convicted of murder, with Joe Bernstein and Abe Bernstein both being given lengthy prison sentences after previously escaping significant jail time through intimidation and corrupt officials. Different waves of bloodier-than-previous infighting ensued, with the aggressive and high-ranking members Abe Axler and Eddie Fletcher getting shot dead. Then one-time partial-boss (there wasn't a strict hierarchy) Henry Shorr was killed in further infighting. Some gangsters drifted away, a few fleeing Detroit, others were executed by fellow members or rival gangsters, and several members were subsequently imprisoned. A rival Sicilian gang, tired of competing with the Purples, eventually decided to eliminate them.

The gang continued in a diminished capacity, but the predecessors of Detroit's modern-day Mafia stepped in and filled the void as The Purple Gang ultimately self-destructed.

== In popular culture ==
Although heavily fictionalized, the 1935 film Public Hero No. 1 deals with the hunting down and capture of the Purple Gang.

The 1959 film The Purple Gang, also heavily fictionalized, includes details of the gang's rise to prominence.

"Jailhouse Rock" by Leiber & Stoller, recorded by Elvis Presley, has the lyric "The whole rhythm section was the Purple Gang". The song was reprised, lyric intact, in the 1980 film The Blues Brothers.

A 1960 second-season episode of The Untouchables simply titled "The Purple Gang", provides a fictional account of the Purple Gang's kidnapping of a mob courier.

Raymond Chandler mentions the Purple Gang in the novel, Farewell, My Lovely:

We curved through the bright mile or two of the Strip, past the Antique shops with famous screen names on them, past the windows full of point lace and ancient pewter, past the gleaming new nightclubs with famous chefs and equally famous gambling rooms, run by polished graduates of the Purple Gang ...

Ian Fleming refers to the Purple Gang in his James Bond novels Diamonds Are Forever, Goldfinger, Thunderball and The Man with the Golden Gun.

The Purple Gang was also referenced by Ross Macdonald in his 1952 novel The Ivory Grin.

Although he was gunned down in the first scene, Max Allan Collins identified "The Rodent" as a Purple Gang torpedo (contract killer) in his novelization of the 1990 film Dick Tracy.

An episode of Detroit 1-8-7 featured a man whose grandfather was a member of the gang.

Detroit rapper Proof has a song on his debut album Searching for Jerry Garcia titled "Purple Gang".

The Table-Top Roleplaying game Champions has a gang in it named "The New Purple Gang".

== See also ==
- History of the Jews in Metro Detroit
